= List of Amtrak stations in California =

Since 1976, California has been one of the several U.S. states that have provided financial assistance to Amtrak (the national passenger railroad company of the United States) for services within its borders. Through Caltrans, the state government provides capital grants and support for station and track improvements (including signaling), locomotives and cars, connecting Amtrak Thruway bus service, and operating assistance for the three routes under the Amtrak California brand: the Capitol Corridor connecting the San Francisco Bay Area with Sacramento; the Pacific Surfliner, running along the coast of Southern California between San Diego and San Luis Obispo; and the Gold Runner connecting the major cities of the San Joaquin Valley with onward service to either the Bay Area or Sacramento.

National Amtrak lines serving California include the California Zephyr from Emeryville to Chicago, Illinois; the Coast Starlight from Los Angeles to Seattle, Washington; the Southwest Chief and the Texas Eagle from Los Angeles to Chicago; and the Sunset Limited from Los Angeles to New Orleans, Louisiana.

== Stations ==
This is the list of 76 active Amtrak stations in California, including 3 with limited Amtrak service, and one conditional request stop. This list does not include stations that are served only by Amtrak Thruway and not Amtrak trains.

^	Stations with Amtrak Thruway stops
†	Stations shared with other rail systems
‡	Stations with limited Amtrak service and shared with other rail systems
^†	Stations shared with Amtrak Thruway and other rail systems
	Conditional request stop
	Listed on the National Register of Historic Places (NRHP)

Station/stop Name	Location	Code	Image	Line(s)	Annual Ridership (FY 2025)	Station Owner(s)	Amtrak Thruway / Rail connection(s)	Notes
Anaheim†	Anaheim	ANA		Pacific Surfliner	207,870	City of Anaheim	Metrolink: Orange County	Replaced the nearby Anaheim–Stadium station in 2014
Antioch–Pittsburg	Antioch	ACA		Gold Runner	35,667	City of Antioch		Planned to be replaced by Oakley station in Oakley
Auburn^	Auburn	ARN		Capitol Corridor	9,348	Union Pacific Railroad	Amtrak Thruway: 20	
Bakersfield^	Bakersfield	BFD		Gold Runner	376,353	City of Bakersfield	Amtrak Thruway: 1, 10, 19	
Barstow^	Barstow	BAR		Southwest Chief	3,300	BNSF Railway/ City of Barstow	Amtrak Thruway: 10	Site of former Casa del Desierto, a former Harvey House listed on the NRHP. Serves the Western America Railroad Museum and Route 66 "Mother Road" Museum.
Berkeley	Berkeley	BKY		Capitol Corridor	99,353	Union Pacific Railroad		
Burbank Airport–South^†	Burbank	BUR		Coast Starlight; Pacific Surfliner	57,923	Caltrans	Amtrak Thruway: 1C; Metrolink: Ventura County	Serves Hollywood Burbank Airport
Downtown Burbank‡	Burbank	BBK		Pacific Surfliner	10,852	City of Burbank	Metrolink: Antelope Valley Ventura County	Limited Amtrak service; former Southern Pacific station
Camarillo†	Camarillo	CML		Pacific Surfliner	52,904	Union Pacific Railroad/ City of Camarillo	Metrolink: Ventura County	
Carpinteria^	Carpinteria	CPN		Pacific Surfliner	27,105	City of Carpenteria/ Union Pacific Railroad	Amtrak Thruway: 10	
Chatsworth†	Chatsworth (Los Angeles)	CWT		Pacific Surfliner	58,788	Los Angeles Department of Transportation	Metrolink: Ventura County	
Chico^	Chico	CIC		Coast Starlight	9,749	City of Chico	Amtrak Thruway: 3	
Colfax^	Colfax	COX		California Zephyr	6,615		Amtrak Thruway: 20	
Colonel Allensworth State Park	Colonel Allensworth State Historic Park	CNL		Gold Runner	1,651			Conditional request stop that requires preapproval and reservations several weeks in advance for groups of not less than 20 persons, accordingly this platform only (no shelter) station is not included on Amtrak's list of active stations.
Corcoran	Corcoran	COC		Gold Runner	21,981	City of Corcoran		Replica of former 1907-built AT&SF depot demolished in 1998. Rebuilt in 1999.
Davis^	Davis	DAV		California Zephyr; Capitol Corridor; Coast Starlight	275,354	City of Davis	Amtrak Thruway: 3	Former Southern Pacific station listed on the NRHP
Dunsmuir	Dunsmuir	DUN		Coast Starlight	3,794	Union Pacific Railroad		
Emeryville^	Emeryville	EMY		California Zephyr; Capitol Corridor; Coast Starlight; Gold Runner	444,451	City of Emeryville	Amtrak Thruway: 99	
Fairfield-Vacaville	Fairfield	FFV		Capitol Corridor	74,502	City of Fairfield		
Fremont†	Fremont	FMT		Capitol Corridor	32,781	City of Fremont	ACE	
Fresno^	Fresno	FNO		Gold Runner	302,753	City of Fresno	Amtrak Thruway: 15B	Former AT&SF station listed on the NRHP
Fullerton^†	Fullerton	FUL		Pacific Surfliner; Southwest Chief	230,141	BNSF and City of Fullerton	Amtrak Thruway: 39; Metrolink: 91/Perris Valley Orange County	Former AT&SF and UP stations, both listed separately on the NRHP
Glendale^†	Glendale	GDL		Pacific Surfliner	53,489	City of Glendale	Amtrak Thruway: 1; Metrolink: Antelope Valley Ventura County	Former Southern Pacific station listed on the NRHP
Goleta	Goleta	GTA		Pacific Surfliner	86,988			
Grover Beach^	Grover Beach	GVB		Pacific Surfliner	14,563	Union Pacific Railroad	Amtrak Thruway: 17, 18, 21	
Guadalupe	Guadalupe	GUA		Pacific Surfliner	12,287	Union Pacific Railroad		
Hanford^	Hanford	HNF		Gold Runner	121,136	BNSF	Amtrak Thruway: 18	One of the few remaining San Francisco and San Joaquin Valley Railway depots in existence.
Hayward	Hayward	HAY		Capitol Corridor	36,948	City of Hayward		
Irvine†	Irvine	IRV		Pacific Surfliner	244,373	City of Irvine	Metrolink: Inland Empire–Orange County Orange County	
Lodi^	Lodi	LOD		Gold Runner	2,769	City of Lodi; Union Pacific Railroad	Amtrak Thruway: 3	
Lompoc-Surf	Surf	LPC		Pacific Surfliner	9,625	Union Pacific Railroad		Located in Surf, but also serves Lompoc.
Los Angeles^†	Los Angeles	LAX		Coast Starlight; Southwest Chief; Sunset Limited; Texas Eagle; Pacific Surfliner	1,066,614	LACMTA	Amtrak Thruway: 1; Metrolink: 91/Perris Valley Antelope Valley Orange County Riverside San Bernardino Ventura County; Metro Rail: A Line, B Line, D Line	Union Station listed on the NRHP
Madera	Madera	MDR		Gold Runner	25,476	County of Madera		Replaced Storey station in 2010. Planned to be replaced by a new Madera station further to the south.
Martinez^	Martinez	MTZ		California Zephyr; Capitol Corridor; Coast Starlight; Gold Runner	267,797	City of Martinez	Amtrak Thruway: 7	
Merced^	Merced	MCD		Gold Runner	135,210	State of California	Amtrak Thruway: 15A	Planned to be replaced by a new Merced station about 7 blocks south.
Modesto	Modesto	MOD		Gold Runner	105,596	City of Modesto		
Moorpark†	Moorpark	MPK		Pacific Surfliner	37,744	City of Moorpark	Metrolink: Ventura County	
Needles	Needles	NDL		Southwest Chief	7,395	BNSF Railway		Site of former El Garces Hotel a former Harvey House listed on the NRHP
Northridge‡	Northridge (Los Angeles)	NRG		Pacific Surfliner	24,364	Los Angeles Department of Transportation	Metrolink: Ventura County	Limited Amtrak service; former Southern Pacific station
Oakland Coliseum†	Oakland	OAC		Capitol Corridor	24,284	Amtrak/BART	BART: Blue Line, Green Line, Orange Line, Oakland Airport Connector	Named Coliseum station by BART
Oakland–Jack London Square^	Oakland	OKJ		Capitol Corridor; Coast Starlight; Gold Runner	246,499	Port of Oakland	Amtrak Thruway: 17	Replaced Oakland 16th Street in 1995
Oceanside^†	Oceanside	OSD		Pacific Surfliner	211,534	North County Transit District	Amtrak Thruway: 1; Coaster; Sprinter; Metrolink: Inland Empire–Orange County Orange County	Replaced a former AT&SF depot in 1984
Ontario	Ontario	ONA		Sunset Limited; Texas Eagle	4,884	City of Ontario/Union Pacific Railroad		
Oxnard^†	Oxnard	OXN		Coast Starlight; Pacific Surfliner	92,195	City of Oxnard	Amtrak Thruway: 10; Metrolink: Ventura County	
Palm Springs	Palm Springs	PSN		Sunset Limited; Texas Eagle	1,688	City of Palm Springs		
Paso Robles^	Paso Robles	PRB		Coast Starlight	9,510	City of Paso Robles	Amtrak Thruway: 17, 18, 21	
Pomona†	Pomona	POS		Sunset Limited; Texas Eagle	1,434	City of Pomona	Metrolink: Riverside	Named Pomona–Downtown station by Metrolink
Redding^	Redding	RDD		Coast Starlight	8,505	Union Pacific Railroad	Amtrak Thruway: 3	Uses former Southern Pacific depot
Richmond†	Richmond	RIC		California Zephyr; Capitol Corridor; Gold Runner	202,257	BART	BART: Orange Line, Red Line	1973-built BART station; used by Amtrak since 1978.
Riverside^†	Riverside	RIV		Southwest Chief	9,468	RCTA; BNSF Railway	Amtrak Thruway: 19; Metrolink: 91/Perris Valley Inland Empire–Orange County Riverside	Named Riverside-Downtown station by Metrolink
Rocklin^	Rocklin	RLN		Capitol Corridor	8,912	Union Pacific Railroad/ City of Rocklin	Amtrak Thruway: 20	
Roseville^	Roseville	RSV		California Zephyr; Capitol Corridor	37,157	City of Roseville; Union Pacific Railroad	Amtrak Thruway: 20	
Sacramento^†	Sacramento	SAC		California Zephyr; Capitol Corridor; Coast Starlight; Gold Runner	764,100	City of Sacramento	Amtrak Thruway: 3, 20, 20C; SacRT light rail: Gold	Former Southern Pacific station listed on the NRHP. Officially named Sacramento Valley Station.
Salinas^	Salinas	SNS		Coast Starlight	20,833	City of Salinas Redevelopment Agency	Amtrak Thruway: 17, 21	
San Bernardino^†	San Bernardino	SNB		Southwest Chief	9,576	San Bernardino Associated Governments	Amtrak Thruway: 19; Metrolink: Inland Empire–Orange County San Bernardino	Former AT&SF station and Harvey House listed on NRHP
San Clemente‡	San Clemente	SNP		Pacific Surfliner	16,486	City of San Clemente/ OCTA	Metrolink: Inland Empire–Orange County Orange County	Named San Clemente Pier station by Metrolink to distinguish from their own San Clemente station. Limited Amtrak service, and weekend-only Metrolink service.
San Diego–Old Town†	San Diego	OLT		Pacific Surfliner	308,805	NCTD	Coaster; San Diego Trolley: Blue Line, Green Line	Named Old Town station by San Diego Trolley.
San Diego^†	San Diego	SAN		Pacific Surfliner	489,962	Catellus Development Corporation	Amtrak Thruway: 1; Coaster; San Diego Trolley: Blue Line, Green Line	Former AT&SF station listed on the NRHP
San Jose^†	San Jose	SJC		Coast Starlight; Capitol Corridor	156,081	PCJPB	Amtrak Thruway: 6, 17, 21; ACE; Caltrain; VTA Light Rail: Green Line	Former Southern Pacific station listed on the NRHP. Commonly known as Diridon station.
San Juan Capistrano†	San Juan Capistrano	SNC		Pacific Surfliner	162,211	City of San Juan Capistrano and OCTA	Metrolink: Inland Empire–Orange County Orange County	Former AT&SF station built in 1894
San Luis Obispo^	San Luis Obispo	SLO		Coast Starlight; Pacific Surfliner	91,566	Union Pacific Railroad	Amtrak Thruway: 17, 18, 21	
Santa Ana†	Santa Ana	SNA		Pacific Surfliner	109,990	OCTA	Metrolink: Inland Empire–Orange County Orange County	
Santa Barbara^	Santa Barbara	SBA		Coast Starlight; Pacific Surfliner	339,569	Redevelopment Agency of the City of Santa Barbara	Amtrak Thruway: 10, 17, 21	Former Southern Pacific station listed on the NRHP
Santa Clara–Great America†	Santa Clara	GAC		Capitol Corridor		City of Santa Clara, Union Pacific Railroad	ACE	
Santa Clara–University†	Santa Clara	SCC		Capitol Corridor	40,932	PCJPB, South Bay Historical Railroad Society	ACE; Caltrain	Former San Francisco and San Jose Railroad depot listed on NRHP
Simi Valley†	Simi Valley	SIM		Coast Starlight; Pacific Surfliner	40,003	City of Simi Valley	Metrolink: Ventura County	
Solana Beach†	Solana Beach	SOL		Pacific Surfliner	202,986	Amtrak	Coaster	
Stockton–Downtown^†	Stockton	SKT		Gold Runner	5,094	City of Stockton	Amtrak Thruway: 3, 6; ACE	Former Southern Pacific station
Stockton–San Joaquin Street^	Stockton	SKN		Gold Runner	274,640	BNSF Railway	Amtrak Thruway: 3, 6	Former AT&SF station
Suisun–Fairfield	Suisun	SUI		Capitol Corridor	65,360	City of Suisun/ Union Pacific Railroad	Former Southern Pacific station	
Truckee^	Truckee	TRU		California Zephyr	16,496	Town of Truckee/ Union Pacific Railroad	Amtrak Thruway: 20A	Former Southern Pacific station
Turlock–Denair	Denair	TRK		Gold Runner	31,978	BNSF Railway		Open shelters. Located in Denair, but also serves Turlock.
Van Nuys^†	Van Nuys (Los Angeles)	VNC		Coast Starlight; Pacific Surfliner	67,885	State of California	Amtrak Thruway: 1C; Metrolink: Ventura County	
Ventura^	Ventura	VEC		Pacific Surfliner	79,936	City of Ventura	Amtrak Thruway: 10	
Victorville	Victorville	VCV		Southwest Chief	7,228	BNSF Railway, Victorville Redevelopment Agency		
Wasco	Wasco	WAC		Gold Runner	23,549	City of Wasco		

== Planned ==
These stations are planned or currently under construction:

Station/stop Name	Location	Planned opening	Line(s)	Notes
Castroville†	Castroville		Capitol Corridor	Planned Amtrak and Caltrain station
Gilroy†	Gilroy		Capitol Corridor	Existing Caltrain station
Hercules	Hercules		Capitol Corridor; Gold Runner	Proposed to include ferry and bus terminal.
Indio	Indio			Former Amtrak rail station planned to be reactivated for limited festival services
King City	King City		Coast Starlight	
Lodi†	Lodi	2027	Gold Runner	Planned Amtrak and ACE station
Madera	Madera		Gold Runner	Planned to replace existing Madera station; future California High-Speed Rail station
Merced†	Merced	2027	Gold Runner	Planned to replace existing Merced station; future ACE and California High-Speed Rail station
Morgan Hill†	Morgan Hill		Capitol Corridor	Existing Caltrain station
Natomas/Sacramento Airport†	Sacramento	2026	Gold Runner	Planned Amtrak and ACE station
Oakley	Oakley		Gold Runner	Planned to replace existing Antioch–Pittsburg station
Pajaro/Watsonville†	Pajaro		Capitol Corridor	Planned Amtrak and Caltrain station
City College†	Sacramento	2029	Gold Runner	Existing SacRT light rail station; future ACE station
Midtown Sacramento†	Sacramento	2026	Gold Runner	Planned Amtrak and ACE station
Old North Sacramento†	Sacramento	2029	Gold Runner	Planned Amtrak and ACE station
Tamien†	San Jose		Capitol Corridor	Existing Caltrain and VTA light rail station

== Former ==
Station/stop Name	Location	Discontinued	Line(s)	Notes
Alhambra	Alhambra	1975	Sunset Limited	
Anaheim–Stadium†	Anaheim	2014	Pacific Surfliner	Replaced by Anaheim Regional Transportation Intermodal Center
Carlsbad Poinsettia†	Carlsbad	2017	Pacific Surfliner	Still served by Coaster
Carlsbad Village†	Carlsbad	2018	Pacific Surfliner	Still served by Coaster
Commerce†	Commerce	1994	Orange County Commuter; San Diegan	Still served by Metrolink
Del Mar	Del Mar	1994	San Diegan	Replaced by Solana Beach station
Encinitas†	Encinitas	2017	Pacific Surfliner	Still served by Coaster
Gerber	Gerber	1972	Coast Starlight	
Indio (SP)	Indio	1998	Sunset Limited; Texas Eagle	Rail service planned to be reactivated for limited festival services
Laguna Niguel/Mission Viejo†	Laguna Niguel	2013	Pacific Surfliner	Still served by Metrolink
Marysville	Marysville	1999	Coast Starlight	
Oakland-16th Street	Oakland	1994	California Zephyr; Capitols; Coast Starlight; San Joaquins	Replaced by Oakland – Jack London Square station
Orange†	Orange	2013	Pacific Surfliner	Still served by Metrolink
Orland	Orland	1982	Coast Starlight	
Pasadena†	Pasadena	1994	Southwest Chief	Rebuilt as a Los Angeles Metro Rail station in 2003
Pomona–North†	Pomona	1994	Southwest Chief	Still served by Metrolink
Riverbank	Riverbank	1999	San Joaquins	Replaced by Modesto station, destroyed by fire in 2005
Sorrento Valley†	San Diego	2018	Pacific Surfliner	Still served by Coaster
Storey	Storey	2010	San Joaquins	Replaced by Madera station

== See also ==
- Amtrak California
- List of Amtrak stations national list
