= Moorpark station =

Railway station in Moorpark, California

Moorpark
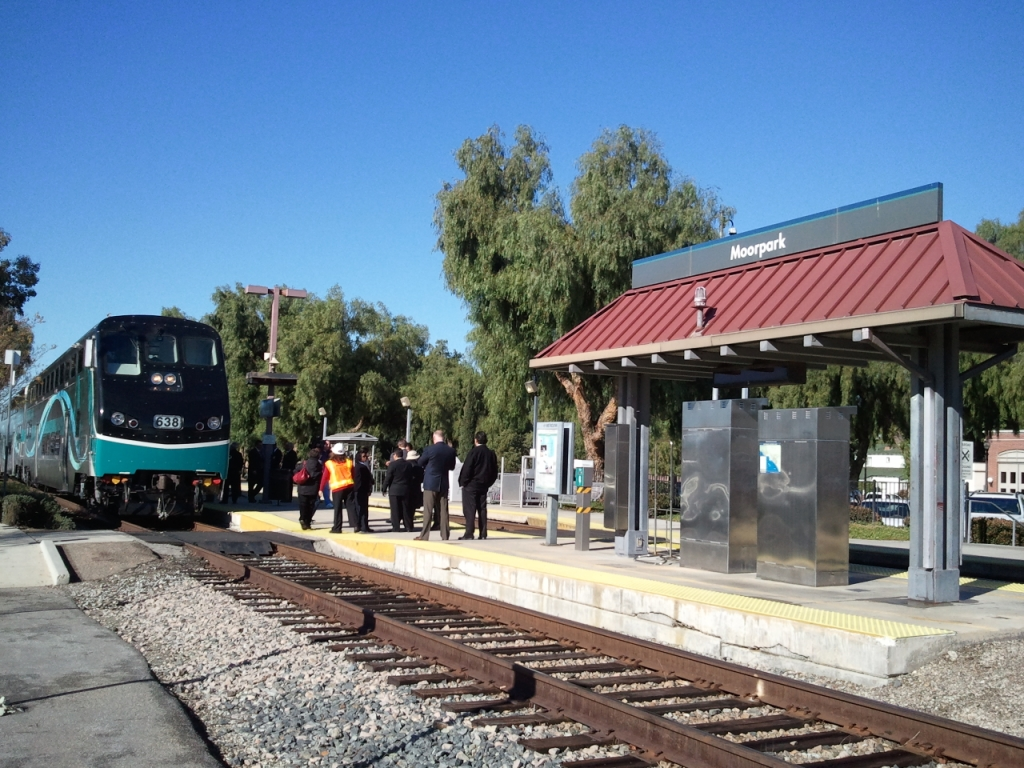
- A Metrolink train arriving at Moorpark station, 2010

General information
- Location: 300 High Street; Moorpark, California; United States
- Coordinates: 34°17′07″N 118°52′37″W
- Owner: City of Moorpark
- Line: SCRRA Ventura Subdivision
- Platforms: 1 side platform, 1 island platform
- Tracks: 2
- Connections: Moorpark City Transit: 1, 2; VCTC Intercity: Cross County, East County

Construction
- Parking: 270 spaces, 8 accessible spaces
- Cycle facilities: Racks
- Accessible: Yes

Other information
- Status: Unstaffed, platform with shelters
- Station code: Amtrak: MPK

History
- Opened: 1983; 43 years ago (CalTrain); October 25, 1992; 33 years ago (Amtrak)

Passengers
- FY 2025: 37,744 annually (Amtrak)
- FY 2026: 105 weekday boardings (Metrolink)

Services
Preceding station	Amtrak	Following station
Camarillo toward San Luis Obispo	Pacific Surfliner	Simi Valley toward San Diego
Coast Starlight does not stop here
Preceding station	Metrolink	Following station
Camarillo toward Ventura–East	Ventura County Line	Simi Valley toward L.A. Union Station
Former services
Preceding station	CalTrain	Following station
Oxnard Terminus	Los Angeles–Oxnard	Simi Valley toward Los Angeles
Preceding station	Southern Pacific Railroad	Following station
Camarillo toward San Francisco	Coast Line	Santa Susana toward Los Angeles
Location

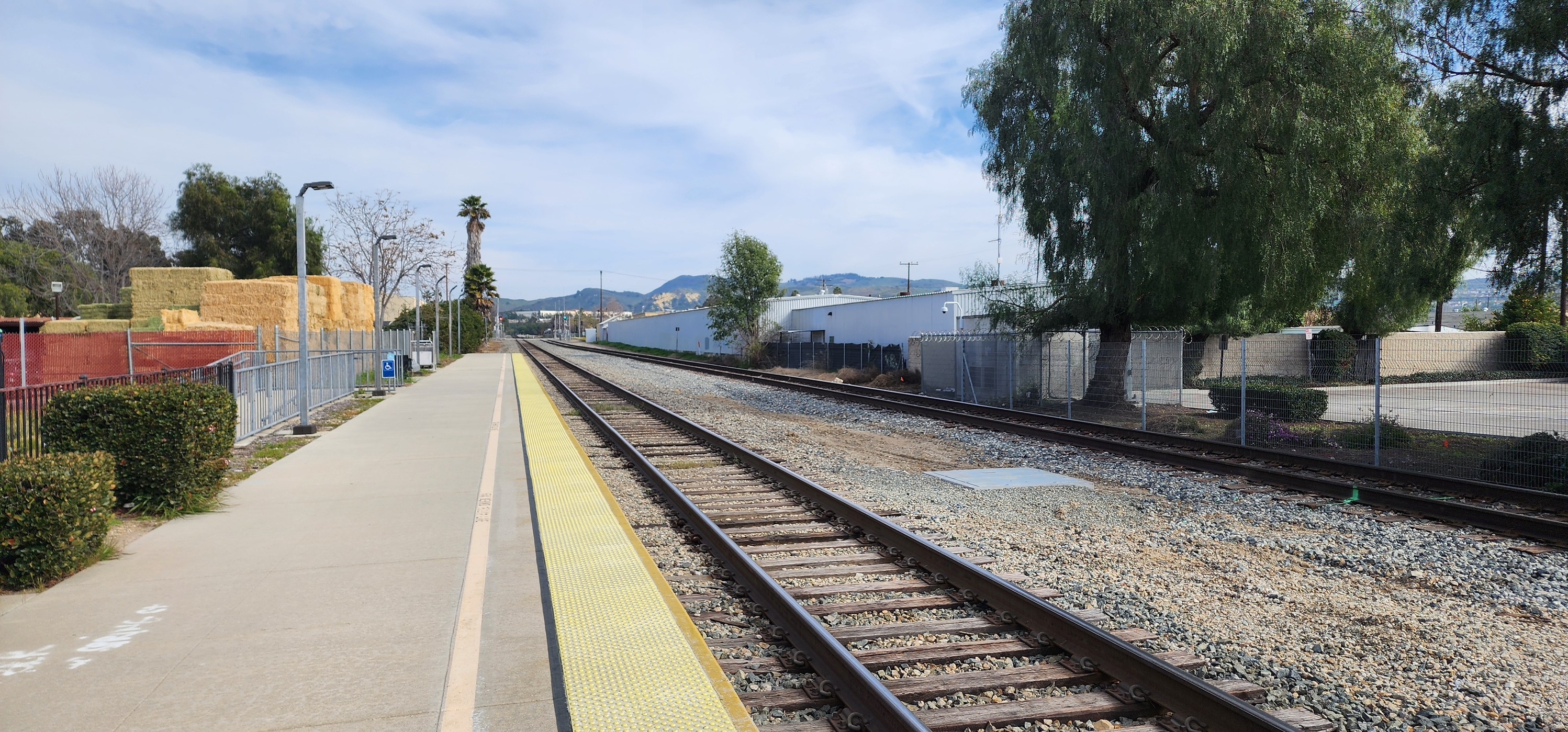
Moorpark Train Station. Facing towards east in February, 2024.

Moorpark station is a passenger rail station in the city of Moorpark, California. Service commenced in 1983 as an infill station on the short-lived CalTrain line. The station was rebuilt in 1992 to accommodate the new Metrolink Ventura County Line commuter trains. Service on that line began on October 26, 1992; Amtrak's Santa Barbara–San Diego San Diegan trains had begun stopping there the day before.

Amtrak's Pacific Surfliner from San Luis Obispo to San Diego and Metrolink's Ventura County Line from Los Angeles Union Station to East Ventura stop here.

Moorpark station is served by 10 Amtrak Pacific Surfliner trains (5 in each direction) every day, with departures evenly spaced throughout the day. 16 Metrolink Ventura County Line trains (8 in each direction) serve the station each weekday, running during peak hours in the peak direction of travel. On weekends, 4 Metrolink Ventura County Line trains (2 in each direction) serve the station. Metrolink passengers also have access to all Pacific Surfliner trains through a codesharing arrangement with Amtrak.

Moorpark served as the Ventura County Line's terminal until service was extended to Oxnard after the Northridge earthquake in 1994, and now acts as the western terminus of the Ventura County Line except during peak hours in the peak direction of travel. Metrolink stores trains in a small yard a short distance west of the station.

In FY2018, boarding or detraining Amtrak passengers averaged approximately 50 passengers daily.

== Historic Moorpark station ==
The original Moorpark station was constructed at 18 E. High Street by the Southern Pacific Railroad in 1900. The first station was destroyed by fire in 1909 and was rebuilt in 1910. It remained in service until the late 1950s and was demolished in 1964. The former station site is now occupied by the Moorpark Chamber of Commerce.
