= Chatsworth station =

Transit center in Los Angeles, California

Chatsworth
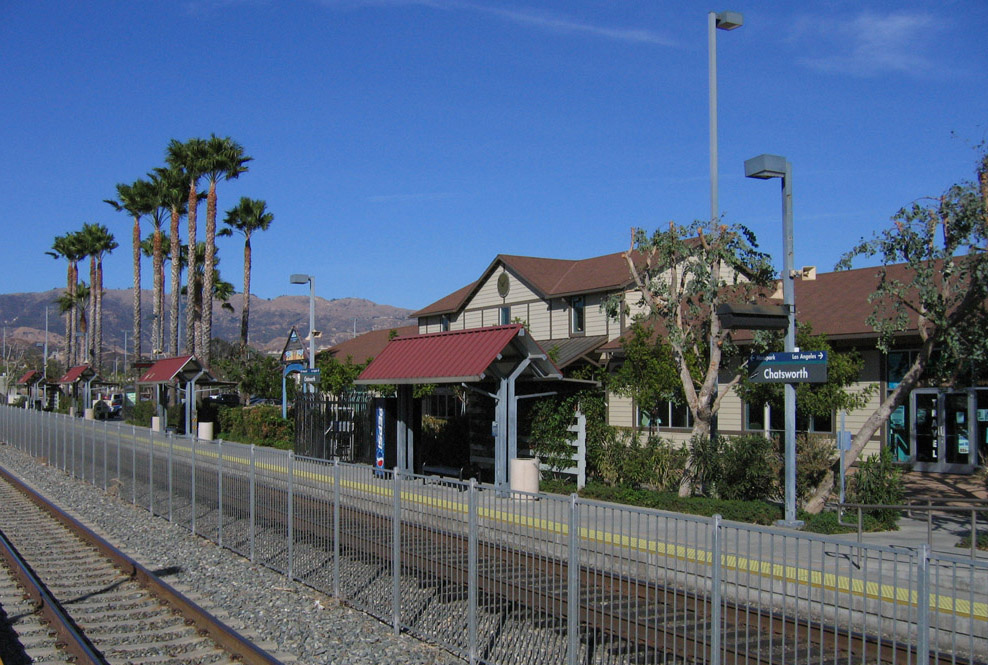
- Amtrak/Metrolink platform at Chatsworth station in November 2006

General information
- Other names: Chatsworth Transportation Center
- Location: 10046 Old Depot Plaza Road; Chatsworth, California; United States
- Coordinates: 34°15′10″N 118°35′58″W
- Owner: City of Los Angeles
- Line: SCRRA Ventura Subdivision
- Platforms: 2 side platforms (rail); 1 side platform (G Line)
- Tracks: 2
- Connections: City of Santa Clarita Transit; LADOT Commuter Express; Los Angeles Metro Bus; Simi Valley Transit

Construction
- Parking: 816 spaces
- Cycle facilities: Racks and lockers
- Accessible: Yes

Other information
- Status: Unstaffed, platform with shelters
- Station code: Amtrak: CWT

History
- Opened: December 29, 1982 (CalTrain); June 26, 1988 (Amtrak); October 26, 1992 (Metrolink); June 30, 2012 (G Line)
- Closed: March 1, 1983 (CalTrain); 1993 (original Amtrak station)
- Rebuilt: 1996

Passengers
- FY 2025: 58,788 annually (Amtrak)
- FY 2026: 175 weekday boardings (Metrolink)
- FY 2026: 573 weekday boardings (Metro)

Services
Preceding station	Amtrak	Following station
Simi Valley toward San Luis Obispo	Pacific Surfliner	Van Nuys toward San Diego
Simi Valley toward San Luis Obispo	Pacific Surfliner	Northridge (limited service) toward San Diego
Coast Starlight does not stop here
Preceding station	Metrolink	Following station
Simi Valley toward Ventura–East	Ventura County Line	Northridge toward L.A. Union Station
Preceding station	Metro Busway	Following station
Terminus	G Line	Nordhoff toward North Hollywood
Former services
Preceding station	CalTrain	Following station
Simi Valley toward Oxnard	Los Angeles–Oxnard	Panorama City toward Los Angeles
Preceding station	Southern Pacific Railroad	Following station
Santa Susana toward San Francisco	Coast Line	Northridge toward Los Angeles
Terminus	Burbank Branch	Owensmouth toward Burbank
Location

Chatsworth station (also known as Chatsworth Transportation Center) is an intermodal passenger transport station in the Los Angeles neighborhood of Chatsworth, United States. It is served by Amtrak Pacific Surfliner inter-city rail service, Metrolink Ventura County Line commuter rail service, and the Metro G Line of the Los Angeles Metro Busway bus rapid transit. The station is also served by Los Angeles Metro Bus and Simi Valley Transit local buses, plus Santa Clarita Transit and LADOT Commuter Express regional express bus routes.

The Southern Pacific Railroad (SP) opened its first Chatsworth station in 1893; SP service ended in the 1950s. CalTrain service from 1982 to 1983, and Amtrak service beginning in 1988, used a station located 1.2 miles (1.9 km) to the southeast. Metrolink service began in 1992 with a station near the former SP station site; Amtrak service soon moved there. A station building was completed in 1996, and bus rapid transit service began in 2012.

== History ==
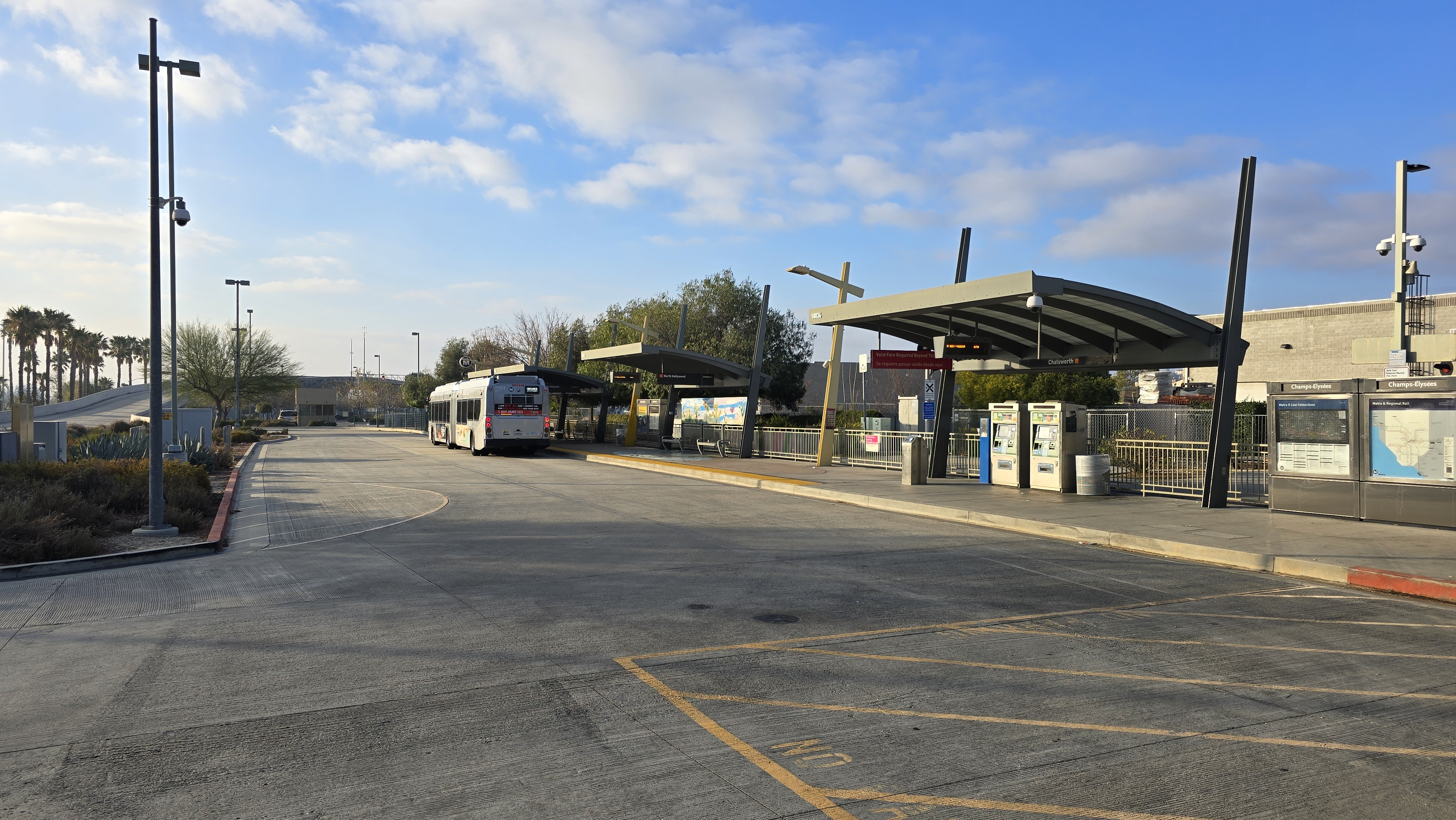
The G Line platform at Chatsworth station in 2025

The Southern Pacific Railroad (SP) opened a 22-mile (35 km) branch line from Burbank to Chatsworth in 1893. The SP extended the branch westward in 1904, eventually forming the Coast Line. The 1893-built station was a typical style: a two-story wooden depot with a longer one-story freight house. It was replaced with a similar larger station in 1910, though was left standing. The original depot burned down in 1917; the newer station was demolished in 1962.

An infill station opened in Chatsworth on the short-lived CalTrain line on December 29, 1982, only to close when service ended on March 2, 1983. On June 26, 1988, Amtrak extended one San Diegan round trip to Santa Barbara, with the ex-CalTrain stop at Chatsworth reused as an intermediate stop. The stop was located just east of DeSoto Avenue, 1.2 miles (1.9 km) southeast of the former SP station site.

On October 26, 1992, Metrolink Ventura County Line service began. The Metrolink station – a bare platform with small shelters – was located near the original station site. Amtrak moved its operations to the Metrolink station by mid-1993. The Chatsworth Transportation Center, opened in 1996, was designed to echo the appearance of the 1893-built station. The 220-foot (67 m)-long structure cost $1.7 million. The station originally had only a single side platform on the east (main) track; a second platform on the west (siding) track was later added.

On June 30, 2012, LA Metro opened a 4-mile (6.4 km) extension of the Orange Line (now the G Line) busway, with Chatsworth as the northern terminus.

== Service ==
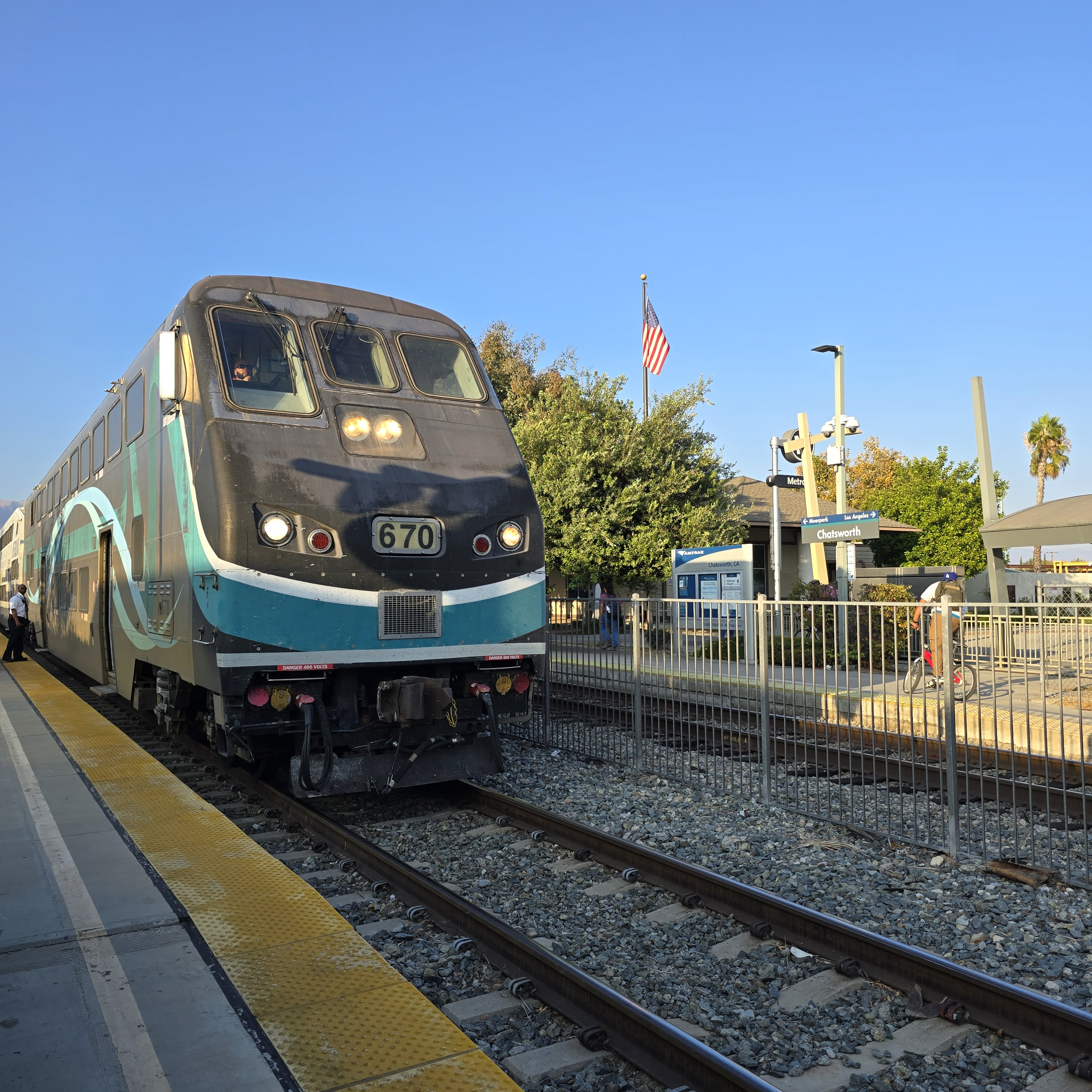
Metrolink train at Chatsworth station, 2024

Chatsworth station is served by 10 Amtrak Pacific Surfliner trains (5 in each direction) every day, with departures evenly spaced throughout the day. 22 Metrolink Ventura County Line trains (11 in each direction) serve the station each weekday, running during peak hours in the peak direction of travel. On weekends, 4 Metrolink Ventura County Line trains (2 in each direction) serve the station. Metrolink passengers also have access to all Pacific Surfliner trains through a codesharing arrangement with Amtrak.

G Line buses run 24 hours a day. Buses operate every eight minutes during peak hours on weekdays. They operate every ten minutes during the daytime on weekdays and most of the day on weekends. Night service on all days is every 20 minutes.

As of January 19, 2025, the following connections are available:

- City of Santa Clarita Transit: 791
- LADOT Commuter Express: 419
- Los Angeles Metro Bus: 150, 158, 167, 244
- Simi Valley Transit: 10

== See also ==
- 2008 Chatsworth train collision – a head-on collision between a Metrolink train and a Union Pacific freight train after the former train had left Chatsworth.
