= Simi Valley station =

Railway station in Simi Valley, California

Simi Valley
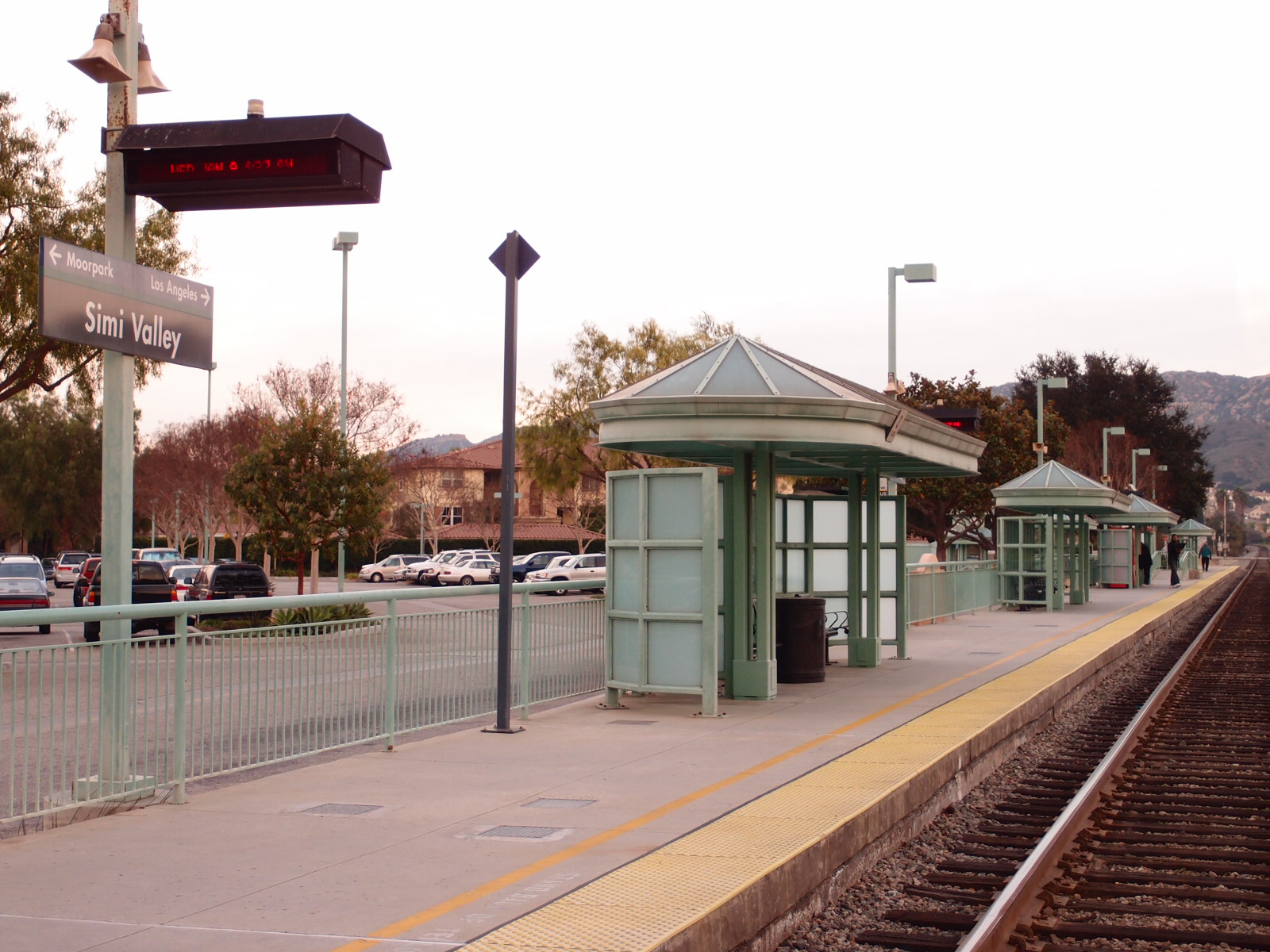
- Simi Valley station platform, 2013

General information
- Location: 5050 Los Angeles Avenue; Simi Valley, California; United States
- Coordinates: 34°16′13″N 118°41′43″W
- Owner: City of Simi Valley
- Line: SCRRA Ventura Subdivision
- Platforms: 1 side platform
- Tracks: 1
- Connections: Simi Valley Transit: 20; VCTC Intercity: Cross County, East County

Construction
- Parking: 569 spaces, 7 accessible spaces
- Cycle facilities: Racks
- Accessible: Yes

Other information
- Status: Unstaffed, platform with shelters
- Station code: Amtrak: SIM

History
- Opened: October 18, 1982 (CalTrain); October 26, 1986 (Amtrak)

Passengers
- FY 2025: 40,003 annually (Amtrak)
- FY 2026: 163 weekday boardings (Metrolink)

Services
Preceding station	Amtrak	Following station
Oxnard toward Seattle	Coast Starlight	Van Nuys toward Los Angeles
Moorpark toward San Luis Obispo	Pacific Surfliner	Chatsworth toward San Diego
Preceding station	Metrolink	Following station
Moorpark toward Ventura–East	Ventura County Line	Chatsworth toward L.A. Union Station
Former services
Preceding station	CalTrain	Following station
Moorpark toward Oxnard	Los Angeles–Oxnard	Chatsworth toward Los Angeles
Preceding station	Southern Pacific Railroad	Following station
Moorpark toward San Francisco	Coast Line	Chatsworth toward Los Angeles
Location

Simi Valley station is a passenger rail station in the city of Simi Valley, California. Amtrak's Pacific Surfliner from San Luis Obispo to San Diego and Metrolink's Ventura County Line from Los Angeles Union Station to East Ventura stop here.

Simi Valley station is served by 10 Amtrak Pacific Surfliner trains (5 in each direction) every day and 2 Coast Starlight trains (1 in each direction), with departures evenly spaced throughout the day. 16 Metrolink Ventura County Line trains (8 in each direction) serve the station each weekday, running during peak hours in the peak direction of travel. On weekends, 4 Metrolink Ventura County Line trains (2 in each direction) serve the station. Metrolink passengers also have access to all Pacific Surfliner trains through a codesharing arrangement with Amtrak.

In fiscal year 2025, 40,003 passengers boarded or detrained at Simi Valley station.

== History ==
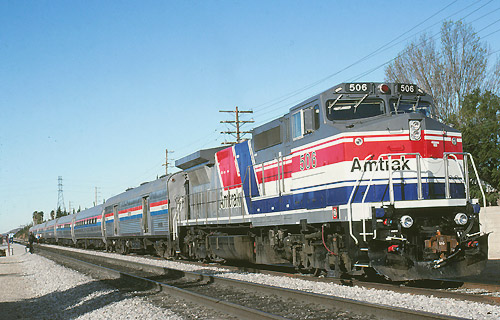
The Amtrak San Diegan at Simi Valley station in January 1992

The Southern Pacific Railroad built a line between Ventura and Los Angeles, as an alternate to the Montalvo to Newhall line. The first passenger station to serve the Rancho Simi area was the Santa Susana Depot, originally located at Tapo Street and Los Angeles Avenue. The depot served the community of Santa Susana which is now mostly within the city of Simi Valley. The historic Santa Susana Depot building has since been preserved and moved three miles east of its original location.

A station parking location at Surveyor Street (just west of Tapo Street) was acquired for CalTrain by 1982. The station opened with the inauguration of CalTrain on October 18, 1982. The CalTrain service was discontinued in 1983. The Amtrak Coast Starlight began stopping the former CalTrain station on October 26, 1986. On June 26, 1988, Amtrak extended one daily San Diegan round trip to Santa Barbara, stopping at Simi Valley. Metrolink Ventura County Line service began on October 26, 1992, stopping at most former CalTrain stations (except Oxnard, which Metrolink began serving after the 1994 Northridge earthquake). Amtrak switched to the Metrolink station, located about one mile east of Tapo Avenue, at that time.

A project to improve the station was announced in 2020. The plan includes a second passenger platform and pedestrian crossing along with a second track which would allow eastbound and westbound trains to be at the station at the same time. The double track would extend about 2 miles (3.2 km) to the west of the station and include improvements at several intersections. As part of the Southern California Optimized Rail Expansion Program, the project will improve safety, enable more frequent service and make existing service more reliable.
