= Camarillo station =

Railway station in Camarillo, California

Camarillo
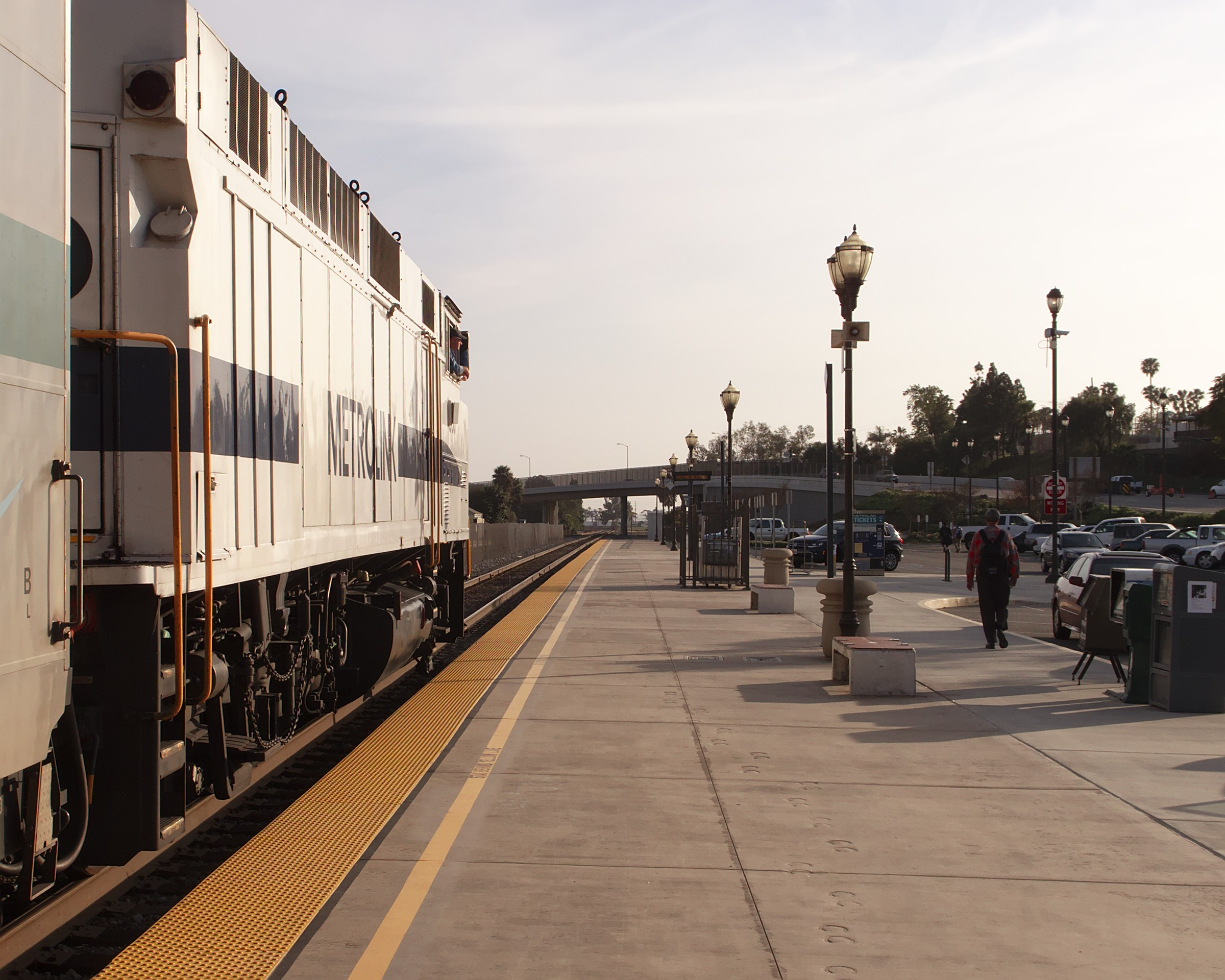
- The platform in 2014, looking southwest at Lewis Road

General information
- Location: 30 Lewis Road; Camarillo, California; United States
- Coordinates: 34°12′59″N 119°02′01″W
- Owner: Ventura County Transportation Commission
- Line: UP Santa Barbara Subdivision
- Platforms: 2 side platforms
- Tracks: 2
- Connections: VCTC Intercity: Channel Islands, Cross County, Highway 101

Construction
- Parking: 406 spaces
- Accessible: Yes

Other information
- Status: Unstaffed, platform with shelter (overpass)
- Station code: Amtrak: CML

History
- Opened: February 14, 1994; 32 years ago

Passengers
- FY 2025: 52,904 annually (Amtrak)
- FY 2026: 81 weekday boardings (Metrolink)

Services
Preceding station	Amtrak	Following station
Oxnard toward San Luis Obispo	Pacific Surfliner	Moorpark toward San Diego
Coast Starlight does not stop here
Preceding station	Metrolink	Following station
Oxnard toward Ventura–East	Ventura County Line	Moorpark toward L.A. Union Station
Former services
Preceding station	Southern Pacific Railroad	Following station
Oxnard toward San Francisco	Coast Line	Moorpark toward Los Angeles
Location

Camarillo station is a passenger train station in Camarillo, California. Amtrak's Pacific Surfliner between San Luis Obispo and San Diego and Metrolink's Ventura County Line between Los Angeles Union Station and Ventura–East station stop here. It is located at the foot of Ventura Boulevard at the intersection of Lewis Road, and is underneath the US Highway 101 overpass. A lengthy pedestrian overcrossing must be used to transfer between the platforms so a shorter tunnel route is planned. The first Camarillo depot was at this same location until Southern Pacific ended passenger service.

Camarillo station is served by 10 Amtrak Pacific Surfliner trains (5 in each direction) every day, with departures evenly spaced throughout the day. 6 Metrolink Ventura County Line trains (3 in each direction) serve the station each weekday, running during peak hours in the peak direction of travel. On weekends, 4 Metrolink Ventura County Line trains (2 in each direction) serve the station. Metrolink passengers also have access to all Pacific Surfliner trains through a codesharing arrangement with Amtrak.

== History ==
When the Southern Pacific Railroad built a new line from Ventura to Los Angeles, it built a depot to serve the Rancho Camarillo. It was a Southern Pacific two-story design, similar to the still existing Santa Susana Depot built on the same line. It was located where the current Ventura Freeway overpass is today. While the overpass was being built in 1955, the depot building was shifted further along the track closer to the old Ventura Boulevard rail crossing. Passenger service stops in Camarillo ended on the Coast line in the 1960s. The depot was offered to the City of Camarillo, but no location could be found to preserve it, so it was demolished in the 1970s. The Ventura Boulevard rail crossing was removed with the opening of the Ventura Freeway.

The Amtrak Coast Starlight train passed through Camarillo in the 1970s and 1980s, but did not stop for passengers. The location was an empty lot used for transloading box cars for many years. The short-lived CalTrain service also passed through Camarillo without stopping.

A temporary platform opened at the station on February 14, 1994, as part of the emergency expansion of service on the Ventura County Line in response to the 1994 Northridge earthquake. Amtrak's San Diegan trains (later renamed the Pacific Surfliner) began stopping in Camarillo on October 30, 1994.
