= Glendale Transportation Center =

Railway station in Glendale, California

Glendale, CA
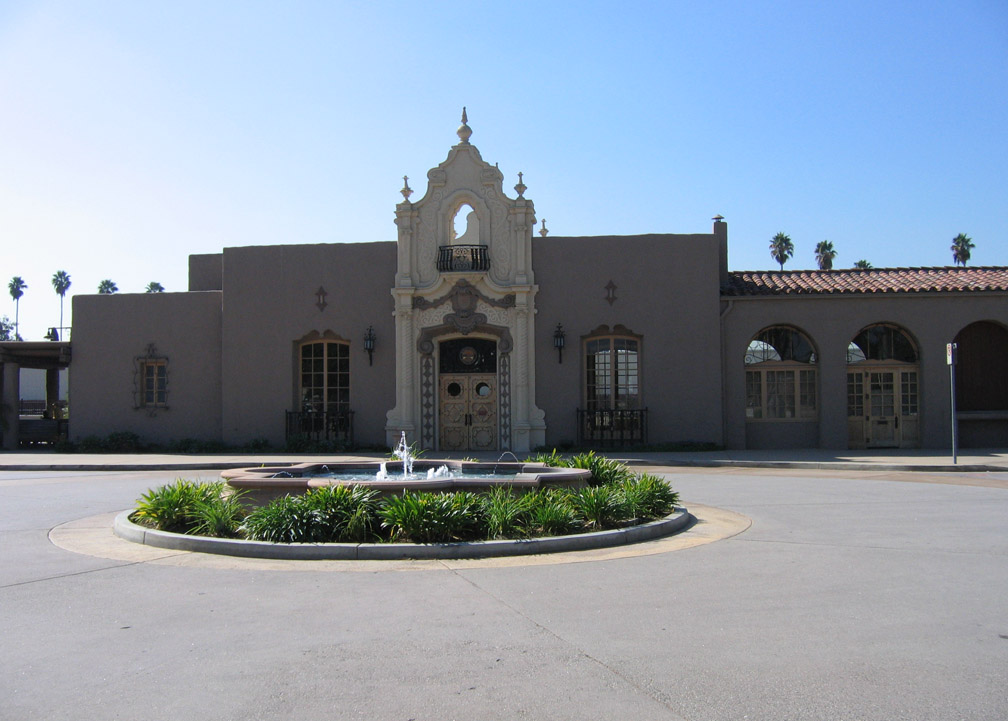
- The Glendale Transportation Center building, 2007

General information
- Other names: Larry Zarian Transportation Center
- Location: 400 West Cerritos Avenue; Glendale, California; United States
- Coordinates: 34.123565°N 118.257844°W
- Owner: City of Glendale
- Line: SCRRA Valley Subdivision
- Platforms: 1 side platform, 1 island platform
- Tracks: 3
- Connections: Amtrak Thruway: 1; Glendale Beeline: 1, 4, 8, 11, 12; Greyhound Lines; Los Angeles Metro Bus: 93

Construction
- Parking: 426 spaces, 17 accessible spaces
- Cycle facilities: Racks and lockers
- Accessible: Yes

Other information
- Status: Unstaffed, platform with shelters
- Station code: Amtrak: GDL

History
- Opened: 1924
- Rebuilt: 1999
- Original company: Southern Pacific

Passengers
- FY 2025: 53,489 annually (Amtrak)
- FY 2026: 350 weekday boardings (Metrolink)
Services
Preceding station	Amtrak	Following station
Hollywood Burbank Airport toward San Luis Obispo	Pacific Surfliner	Los Angeles toward San Diego
Downtown Burbank (limited service) toward San Luis Obispo	Pacific Surfliner	Los Angeles toward San Diego
Coast Starlight does not stop here
Preceding station	Metrolink	Following station
Downtown Burbank toward Lancaster	Antelope Valley Line	L.A. Union Station Terminus
Downtown Burbank toward Ventura–East	Ventura County Line	L.A. Union Station Terminus
Former services
Preceding station	Amtrak	Following station
Hollywood Burbank Airport toward Seattle	Coast Starlight 1971–2005	Los Angeles Terminus
Oxnard toward Sacramento	Spirit of California 1981–1983	Los Angeles Terminus
Preceding station	Southern Pacific Railroad	Following station
Burbank toward San Francisco	Coast Line	River toward Los Angeles
Burbank toward San Jose	Los Angeles – San Jose	Los Angeles Terminus
Oxnard toward San Francisco	Coast Daylight	Los Angeles Terminus
Saugus toward Oakland Pier	San Joaquin Daylight	Los Angeles Terminus
Saugus toward Sacramento	Sacramento Daylight	Los Angeles Terminus
Ventura toward San Francisco	Lark	Los Angeles Terminus
Preceding station	CalTrain	Following station
Burbank Airport toward Oxnard	Los Angeles–Oxnard	Los Angeles Terminus
- Glendale Southern Pacific Railroad Depot
- U.S. National Register of Historic Places
- Architect: Maurice Couchot & Kenneth A. MacDonald Jr.
- Architectural style: California Churrigueresque (Spanish Colonial Revival)
- NRHP reference No.: 97000376
- Added to NRHP: May 2, 1997
Location

The Glendale Transportation Center (officially the Larry Zarian Transportation Center) is an intermodal passenger transport center in the city of Glendale, California.

The train station structure combines the Spanish Colonial Revival and California Churrigueresque architectural styles. It was placed on the National Register of Historic Places in 1997.

Amtrak's Pacific Surfliner runs frequently to San Diego to the south and to San Luis Obispo to the north. Metrolink's Antelope Valley and Ventura County commuter rail lines also service the center. The center also serves as a bus station, with direct service from Glendale Beeline local buses and Amtrak Thruway and Greyhound Lines inter-city buses

== History ==
=== Southern Pacific Railroad ===
==== Early years ====
Train service came to Glendale in 1883, with the Atwater Tract Office serving as the city's station. Beginning in 1904, Pacific Electric's Glendale–Burbank Line streetcars served the station, stopping at the intersection of Glendale Boulevard and Gardena Avenue. By the 1920s, the city's rapid growth led to the station's demolition and replacement. Originally known as the Glendale Southern Pacific Railroad Depot, the new station was built by the Southern Pacific Railroad. The station was designed by architects Kenneth A. MacDonald Jr. and Maurice Couchot in the Spanish Colonial Revival style.

The San Joaquin Daylight, between Los Angeles and San Francisco, began to serve Glendale in 1941.

==== Post-war decline ====
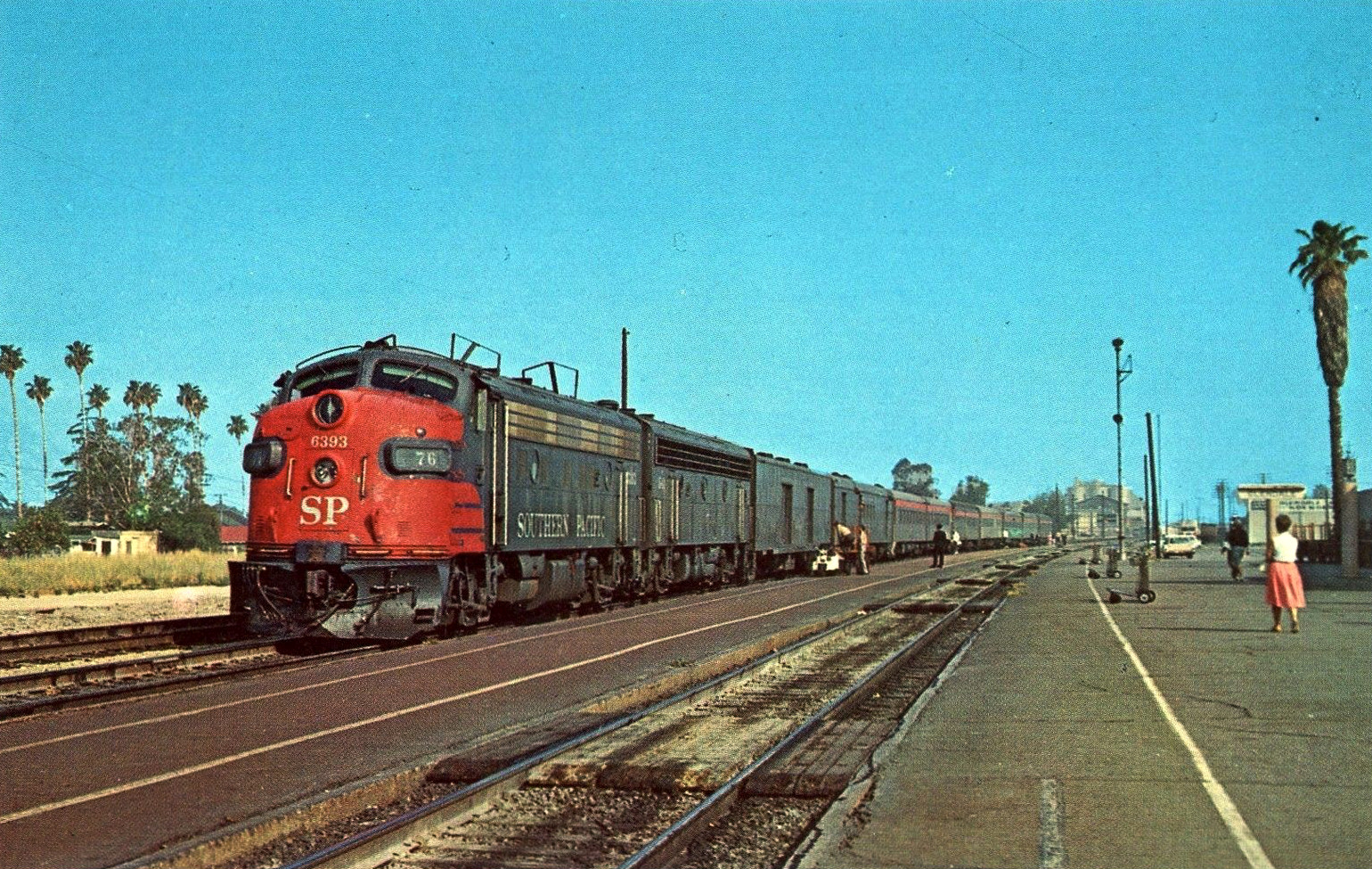
Southern Pacific Railroad Lark at Glendale in 1965

Following the Second World War, as automobile and airplane use increased, passenger train use fell significantly.

In October 1953, the Glendale–Burbank Line came under the purview of Metropolitan Coach Lines, which initiated a series of service reductions. Interurban service, including the streetcar stop adjacent to the station, ended in 1955.

Southern Pacific's overnight Lark trains served Glendale until 1968, but the Coast Daylight trains continued until 1971, when Amtrak acquired the route. Positive response led to Amtrak to retain this service, but the Coast Daylight name was dropped in 1974 in favor of Coast Starlight.

Amtrak's Spirit of California, between Los Angeles and Sacramento, began to serve Glendale in 1981. It was the first overnight service between the two cities since the discontinuation of Southern Pacific's Lark in 1968. Beginning in 1982, Glendale was also served by the CalTrain commuter rail system. Governor George Deukmejian's opposition to passenger rail led to both lines being cancelled in 1983.

When Amtrak's San Diegan was extended north to Santa Barbara in 1988, service was added for Glendale.

=== City of Glendale ===
==== Revival and expansion ====
The city bought the depot from Southern Pacific in 1989 to ensure its preservation and acquired adjacent properties to create an intermodal passenger transport center, which included a bus station and parking for 750 cars.

In 1992, Metrolink brought commuter rail service back to Glendale, with the Santa Clarita Line and Ventura County Line. Both Southern California Rapid Transit District and Glendale Beeline coordinated bus schedules with trains in order to serve commuters. Following the 1994 Northridge Earthquake, Metrolink rapidly accelerated its expansion of its Santa Clarita line to the Antelope Valley.

By 2005, Amtrak's Coast Starlight had decreased to only one daily northbound and southbound stop in Glendale. Coast Starlight service in Glendale was discontinued, leaving the Pacific Surfliner as the only Amtrak service in the city.

==== Modern history ====
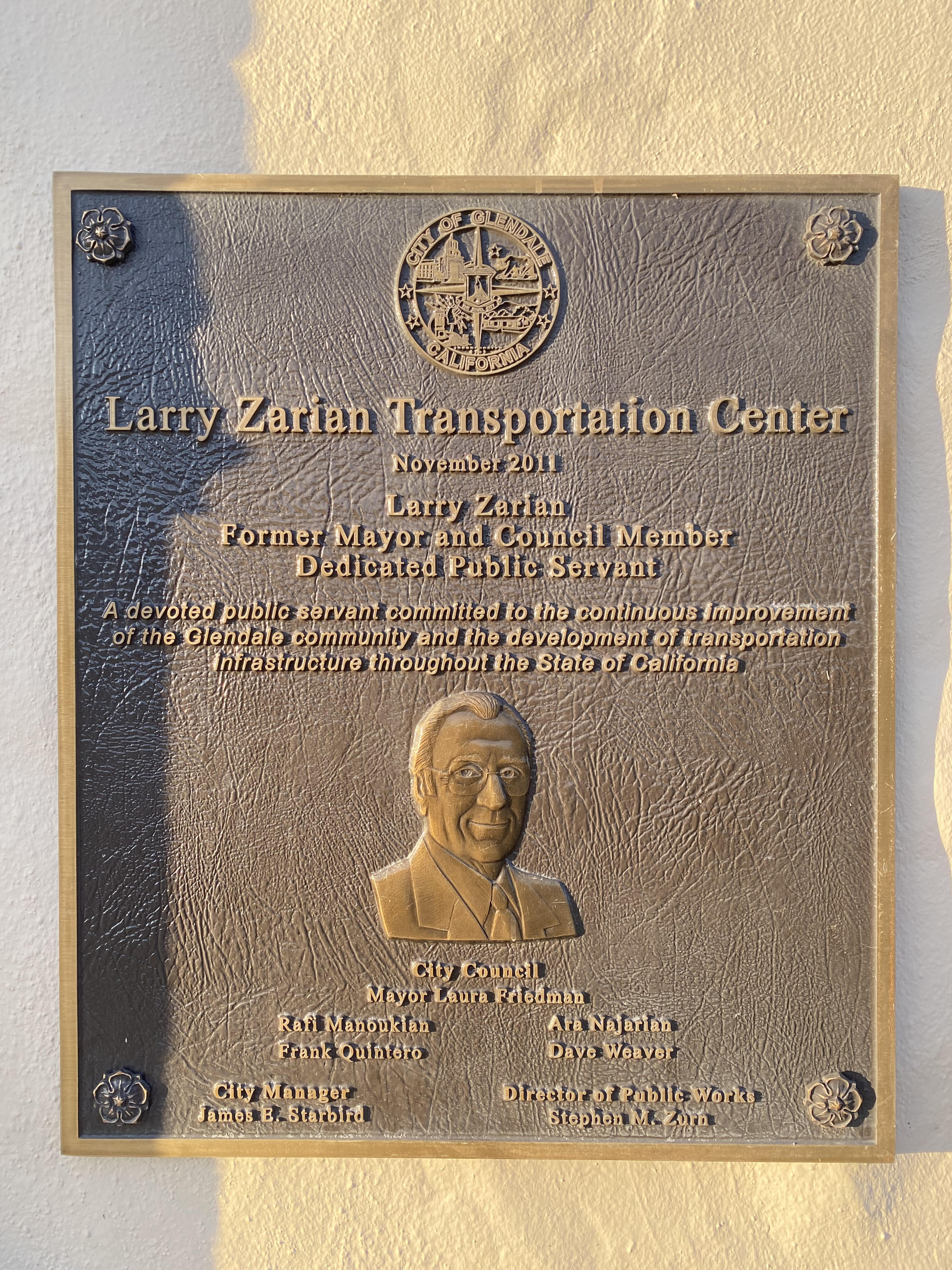
The dedication plaque found on the front of the building

In November 2011, shortly following his death, the station was dedicated to former Glendale mayor Larry Zarian. He had served on Metro's board of directors, where he was a forceful advocate for Metro Rail service for Glendale.

In 2012, Metro awarded Glendale with a grant to plan transit-oriented development surrounding the station through new zoning regulations, design guidelines, and public infrastructure improvements. This has led to increased housing, improved wayfinding, enhanced bus stops, bicycle lanes, and improved connectivity with Atwater Village.

In 2021, in coordination with Los Angeles Metro's NextGen service changes, the Metro Micro on-demand microtransit service began to serve the facility.

In preparation for the 2028 Summer Olympics, Representative Laura Friedman has secured federal funding for modernizing the passenger information system at the station.

== Architecture ==
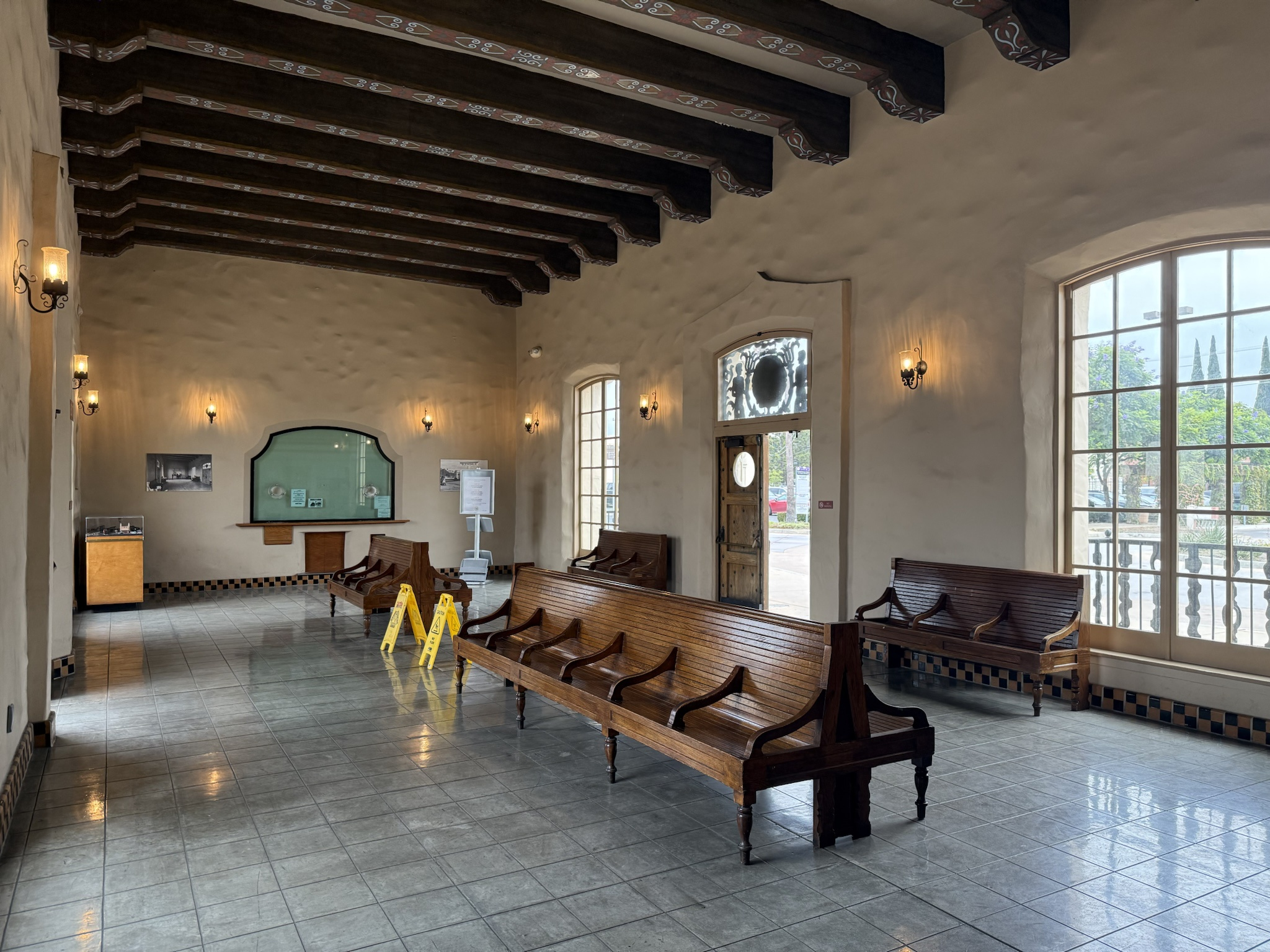
Interior of the Glendale Transportation Center (2026)

The station was designed by architects Kenneth A. MacDonald Jr. and Maurice Couchot, who had previously collaborated in the design of the Broadway-Spring Arcade in Downtown Los Angeles. The structure combines Spanish Colonial Revival and California Churrigueresque styles. The depot's appearance reflects the boosterism of the era, which used Spanish-style architecture to promote Anglo-American settlement of the American west.

Architectural highlights include the twin portals which face the trains on one side and the city on the other, topped with Spanish mission-style bell towers.

The station underwent three principal alterations, none of which are considered to have damaged the historic integrity of the building. In 1943, one of the station's pergolas was enclosed for use as an employee break room, and the ticket counter was moved. Around 1953, the district office was built. A 1979 restoration removed the 1943 ticket counter and re-sited it in the original location. The break room was converted back to an open space at the same time.

Following damage from the 1994 Northridge Earthquake, the station was restored in 1999.

== Services ==
=== Train services ===
==== Amtrak ====
- Pacific Surfliner, from San Diego to San Luis Obispo (service to Glendale began in 1988 as San Diegan, renamed Pacific Surfliner in 2000)

==== Metrolink ====
The station serves two Metrolink lines:

- Antelope Valley Line, to Lancaster (service began in 1992)
- Ventura County Line, to Ventura (service began in 1992)

=== Bus and coach services ===
==== Local buses ====
- Glendale Beeline: 1, 4, 8, 11*, 12*
- Los Angeles Metro Bus: 93**

* Indicates commuter service that operates only during weekday rush hours.
** Stops at the nearby intersection of San Fernando Road and Cerritos Avenue.

==== Long-distance motorcoach ====
- Amtrak Thruway
- Greyhound Lines

=== On-demand transportation ===
- Metro Micro*

* Limited to the "Highland Park/Eagle Rock/Glendale Service Zone," which includes the Northeast Los Angeles communities of Atwater Village, Cypress Park, Eagle Rock, Glassell Park and Highland Park, and nearby Silver Lake.

== Future expansion ==
In 1992, the Los Angeles County Transportation Commission began to study a light rail line for the Burbank-Glendale-Los Angeles Union Station corridor. In 2009, Metro identified the project as Tier 1 in its "Strategic Unfunded Plan." In 2016, Metro and Eco-Rapid Transit further studied the idea.

A feasibility study for a streetcar connecting with downtown Glendale is underway.

== In popular culture ==
The station has been used in numerous films as a filming location, sometimes as a stand in for other locations. Films include:

- College (1927)
- Horse Shoes (1927)
- Wings (1927)
- Big Business Girl (1931)
- One More Chance (1931)
- Girl Missing (1933)
- Here Comes the Groom (1934)
- Act of Violence (1949)
- Bulletproof (1996)

== See also ==
- Glendale Register of Historic Resources and Historic Districts
