= OXN =

OXN may refer to:

- Oxenholme Lake District railway station, England; National Rail station code OXN
- Oxnard (Amtrak station), California, United States; Amtrak station code OXN
- Oxonica, a British nanotechnology company; EPIC code OXN
- ØXN, Ireland, an Irish doom folk ensemble consisting of members Radie Peat, Katie Kim, John Murphy, and Eleanor Myler.
