= Atwater Tract Office =

Coordinates: 34.1237°N 118.2587°W

General information
- Owner: City of Glendale
- Line: Southern Pacific
- Tracks: 1

History
- Opened: 1883
- Closed: 1922
Location

The Atwater Tract Office is a historic train station located in Glendale, California. It was built in 1883, soon after Atwater Village had been settled, and served the city of Glendale from 1883 until its closure and demolition in 1922.

== History ==
In 1868 an early developer of Los Angeles, W.C.B. Richardson, bought the area that would become Atwater Village and most of what is now modern-day Glendale for $51 (equivalent to $1,234 in 2025). The City of Los Angeles decided to run a rail line through Glendale so residents would have an easier commute to and from Los Angeles. After line was completed, the City of Los Angeles built a train station at Atwater Village, naming it for the village. The Pacific Electric Railway Company constructed their interurban line adjacent to the station in the early 1900s.

The Atwater Tract Office continued to serve the City of Glendale until 1922 when the city decided a larger station was needed to serve more passengers. In January 1922, the Atwater Tract Office closed and was demolished soon after. Droves of construction workers came to Glendale to build the new station and most of them took up residence in Atwater Village, claiming every remaining empty lot. In 1923, the new Glendale train station was completed. Most of the workers who built the new station continued to live in Atwater Village.
