= VCTC Intercity =

Public bus service in Ventura County, California

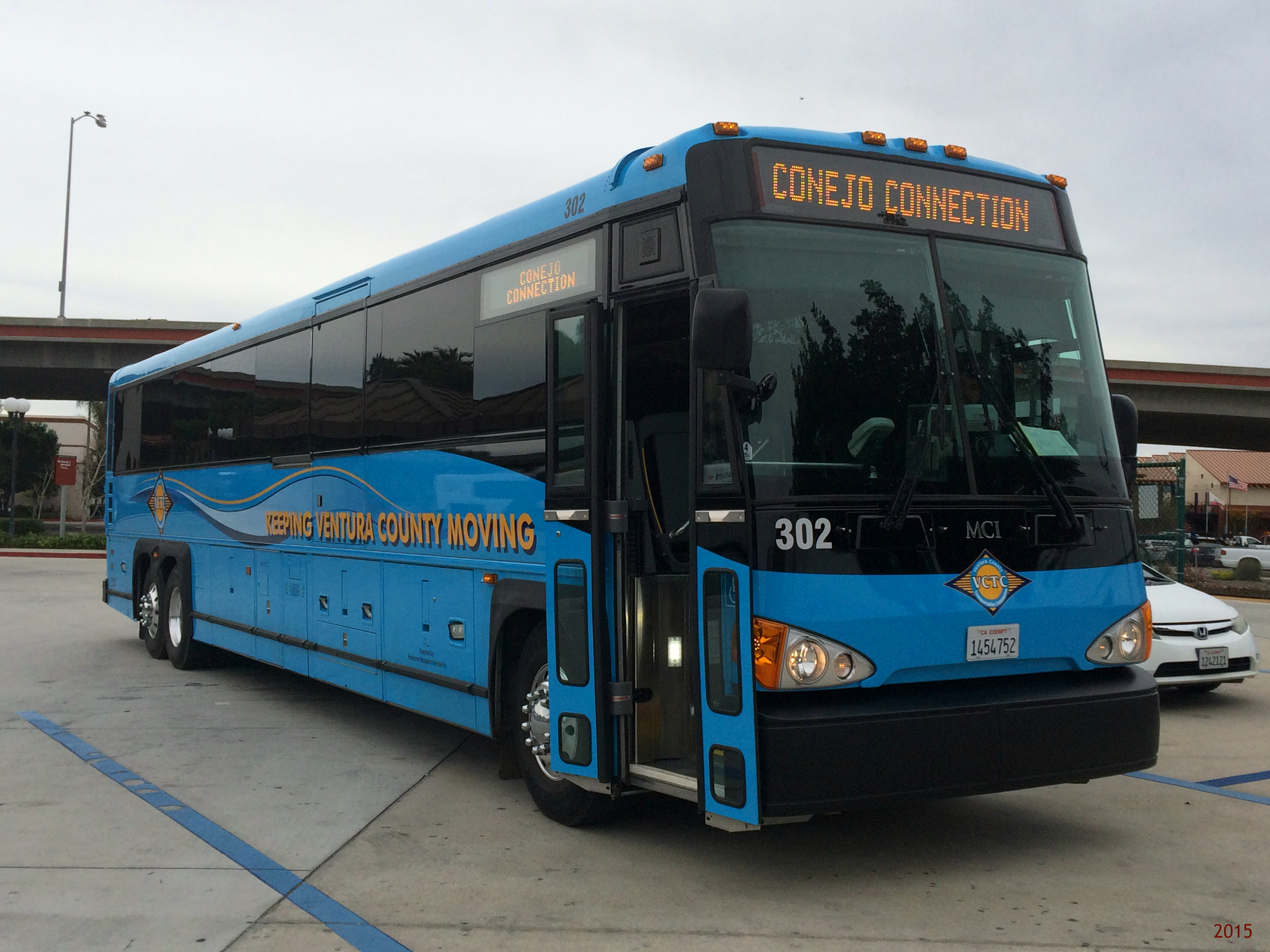
- VISTA bus at Oxnard Transit Center in January 2015
- Parent: Ventura County Transportation Commission
- Founded: 1994
- Headquarters: 751 E. Daily Drive, Suite 420; Camarillo, California
- Service area: Ventura County, California
- Service type: Bus service, paratransit
- Daily ridership: 1,500 (weekdays, Q2 2026)
- Annual ridership: 372,100 (2025)
- Operator: RATP Dev
- Chief executive: Martin Erickson
- Website: VCTC Intercity

VCTC Intercity is a public transit agency providing bus service in Ventura County, California. Formerly known as Ventura Intercity Service Transit Authority or VISTA,) it provides an intercity bus service between the cities of Ventura, Oxnard, Camarillo, Thousand Oaks, Moorpark, Santa Paula, and Fillmore in Ventura County, and to communities in neighboring Los Angeles and Santa Barbara counties. The agency is part of the Ventura County Transportation Commission, a governmental body that oversees transportation planning and funding in Ventura County. In 2025, the system had a ridership of 372,100, or about 1,500 per weekday as of the second quarter of 2026.

== History ==
Before VISTA was formed in 1994, the County of Ventura provided rudimentary intercity bus service. One line ran along US 101 with stops in Ventura, Oxnard, Camarillo, Thousand Oaks, and Westlake Village. Another service linked Thousand Oaks and Moorpark via SR 23. The city of Fillmore sponsored a route consisting of a few trips between Fillmore and Ventura along SR 126. Because of the limited nature of these services, the Ventura County Transportation Commission proposed a comprehensive intercity bus system.

Logo for Ventura Intercity Service Transit Authority.

VISTA began service on four core lines (Highway 101, East County, Highway 126, and a Central County route serving Camarillo, Camarillo State Mental Hospital, Point Mugu, and Oxnard) in July 1994. Over time, these routes have been adjusted according to ridership. With the closing of Camarillo State Hospital and the repurposing of the hospital grounds as California State University, Channel Islands, the Central route was cancelled and two new campus shuttle routes were implemented. In 1998, service was extended to Warner Center in Los Angeles County, and in 2001, service was extended to Santa Barbara.

In early 2015, VCTC changed the name of the service from VISTA to VCTC Intercity.

The VCTC Intercity bus service is operated by Roadrunner Shuttle, a subsidiary of RATP Dev USA, under contract. Due to the length of the VISTA routes, over-the-road coaches are used.

== Routes ==
=== Highway 101 / Conejo ===
Provides service along the length of US 101 in Ventura County, originating at the Pacific View Mall, and stopping at various places in Oxnard, Camarillo, and Thousand Oaks. Routes are numbered 50–52X.

Four round trips, two in the morning and two in the afternoon, connect Oxnard, Camarillo, and Thousand Oaks with the Warner Center Transit Hub and other stops at Warner Center, a business and residential complex in the western San Fernando Valley, in Los Angeles County. At the transit hub, riders may connect with a shuttle to the Metro G Line and other transit services from a variety of agencies, providing access to many points in Los Angeles County.

=== Highway 126 ===
This route also originates at the Pacific View Mall in Ventura and operates along SR 126 to Saticoy, Santa Paula, and Fillmore. Routes are numbered 60-62.

=== East County ===
VISTA East County route operates in the SR 23 corridor between Westlake Village, Thousand Oaks, Moorpark, and Simi Valley. Routes are numbered 70–73X.

=== Coastal Express ===
This route connects Ventura with Carpinteria and Santa Barbara. Peak hour trips also serve Goleta and UC Santa Barbara. Riders may connect with MTD services in Santa Barbara County. Routes are numbered 80–89. This VCTC service replaced a Clean Air Express line in 2001.

=== Channel Islands ===
Originally two separate lines, this shuttle route connects CSU Channel Islands with the Camarillo Metrolink Station and the Oxnard "C" Street Transfer Center. Students are encouraged to park in the lots and use this service to get to campus. Routes are numbered 90–99.

== Dial-a-ride services ==
VISTA operates dial-a-ride service (on demand for those meeting certain requirements) in Santa Paula, Fillmore, and Piru.

== See also ==
- Gold Coast Transit — Local bus service within and between Oxnard, Ventura, Port Hueneme, and Ojai, and adjacent unincorporated communities in Ventura County
- Metrolink (California) — Commuter rail service connecting Ventura, Oxnard, Camarillo, Moorpark, and Simi Valley to Los Angeles County and other parts of Southern California
- Oxnard–Thousand Oaks–Ventura metropolitan area

== Sources ==
- Ventura County Interconnect schedule brochures: 1985–1991
- Various VISTA schedule brochures: 1992–present
