= Ventura County Line =

Commuter rail line in Southern California

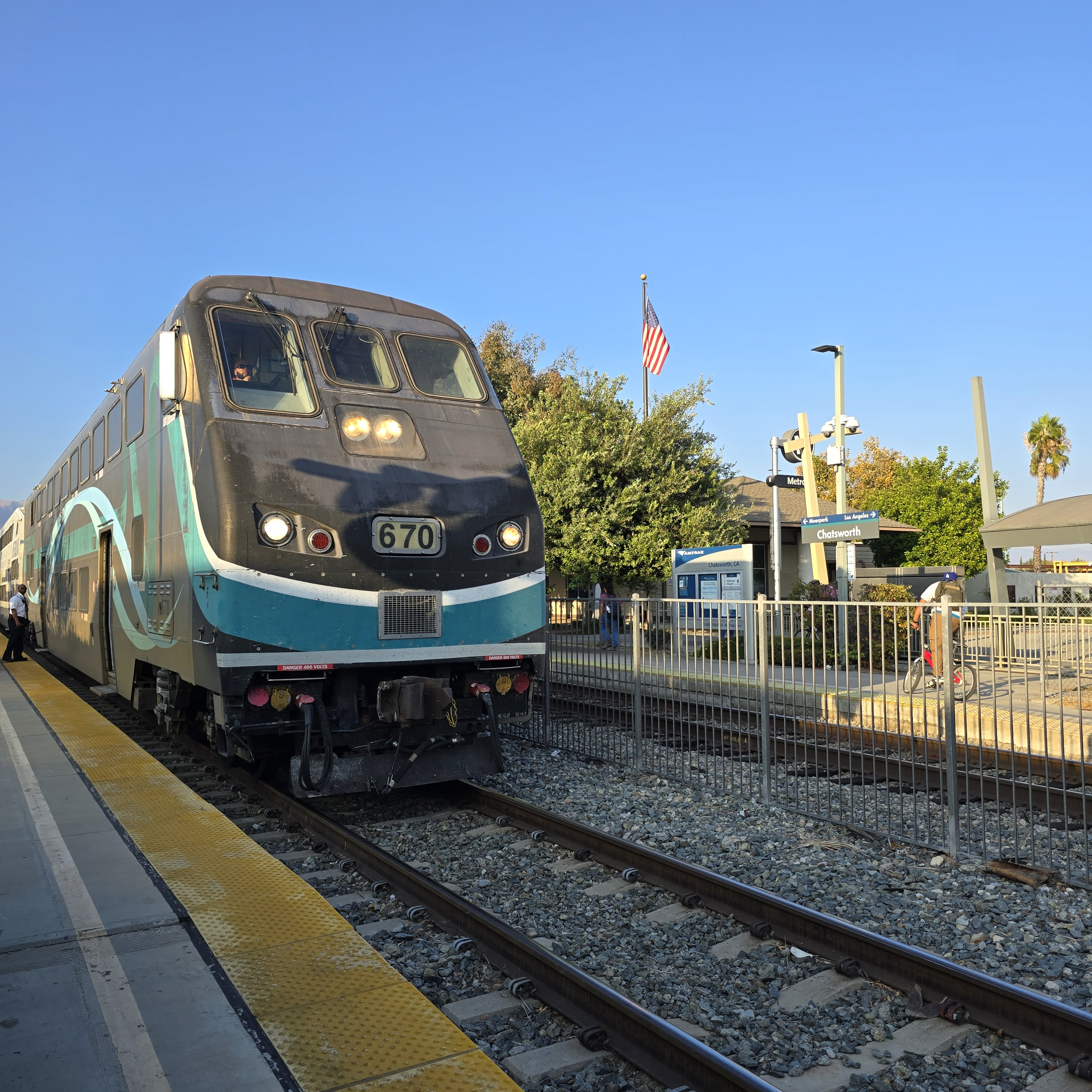
- Ventura County Line at Chatsworth bound for LA Union Station.

Overview
- Locale: Greater Los Angeles Area and Ventura County
- Termini: Ventura–East; L.A. Union Station
- Stations: 12

Service
- Type: Commuter rail
- System: Metrolink
- Operator: Metrolink
- Daily ridership: 2,570 (weekdays, Q3 2025)

History
- Opened: October 26, 1992
- Extended from Moorpark to Oxnard: February 14, 1994
- Extended from Oxnard to Ventura–East: November 11, 2002

Technical
- Line length: 70.9 miles (114.1 km)
- Character: Elevated and surface-level
- Track gauge: 4 ft 8 1/2 in (1,435 mm) standard gauge
- Operating speed: 39 mph (63 km/h) (avg.)
Route map
Ventura County Line highlighted in yellow

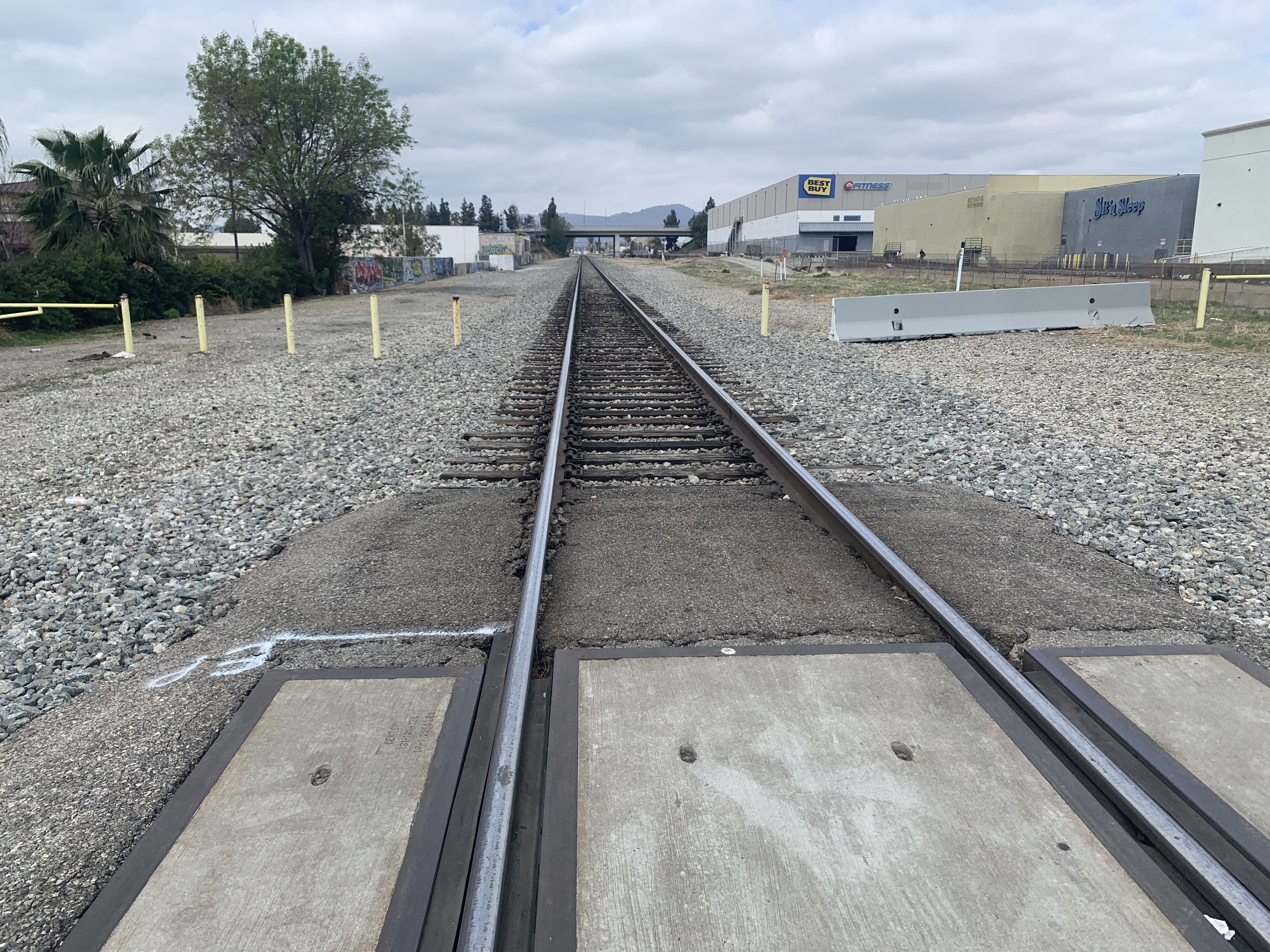
View of the Ventura County Line railway on Tampa Avenue heading to Chatsworth station

The Metrolink Ventura County Line is a commuter rail line serving Ventura County and the San Fernando Valley in Los Angeles County and the City of Los Angeles, in the Southern California system. The line is the successor of the short lived CalTrain commuter rail line.

== Schedules ==
As of October 23, 2023, the Ventura County Line is served by 20 Metrolink trains (ten in each direction) each weekday, running primarily at peak hours in the peak direction of travel.

However, of those trains, only six trains (three in each direction) travel the entire length of the line between Los Angeles and Ventura–East station. Sixteen trains (eight in each direction) short turn, traveling only between Los Angeles and Moorpark station, while 20 trains (ten in each direction) travel between Los Angeles and Chatsworth station.

Two round trips operate on weekends over the entire length of the line. Metrolink passengers (except those at Ventura–East station) also have access to four Pacific Surfliner trains (two in each direction) each day through a codeshare agreement.

== Tracks ==
The line operates between Moorpark and Los Angeles Union Station on tracks owned by the Los Angeles County Metropolitan Transportation Authority – the Ventura Subdivision from Moorpark to Burbank Airport and the Valley Subdivision, the Valley Subdivision from Burbank to Glendale, becoming the River Subdivision into Los Angeles Union Station. It uses the Coast Line of the Union Pacific Railroad between Moorpark and Oxnard, a segment shared with Amtrak's Pacific Surfliner and Coast Starlight, and into Ventura where the Santa Paula Branch splits from the Coast Line. Ventura–East station and layover facility are on the Santa Paula Branch Line.

== History ==
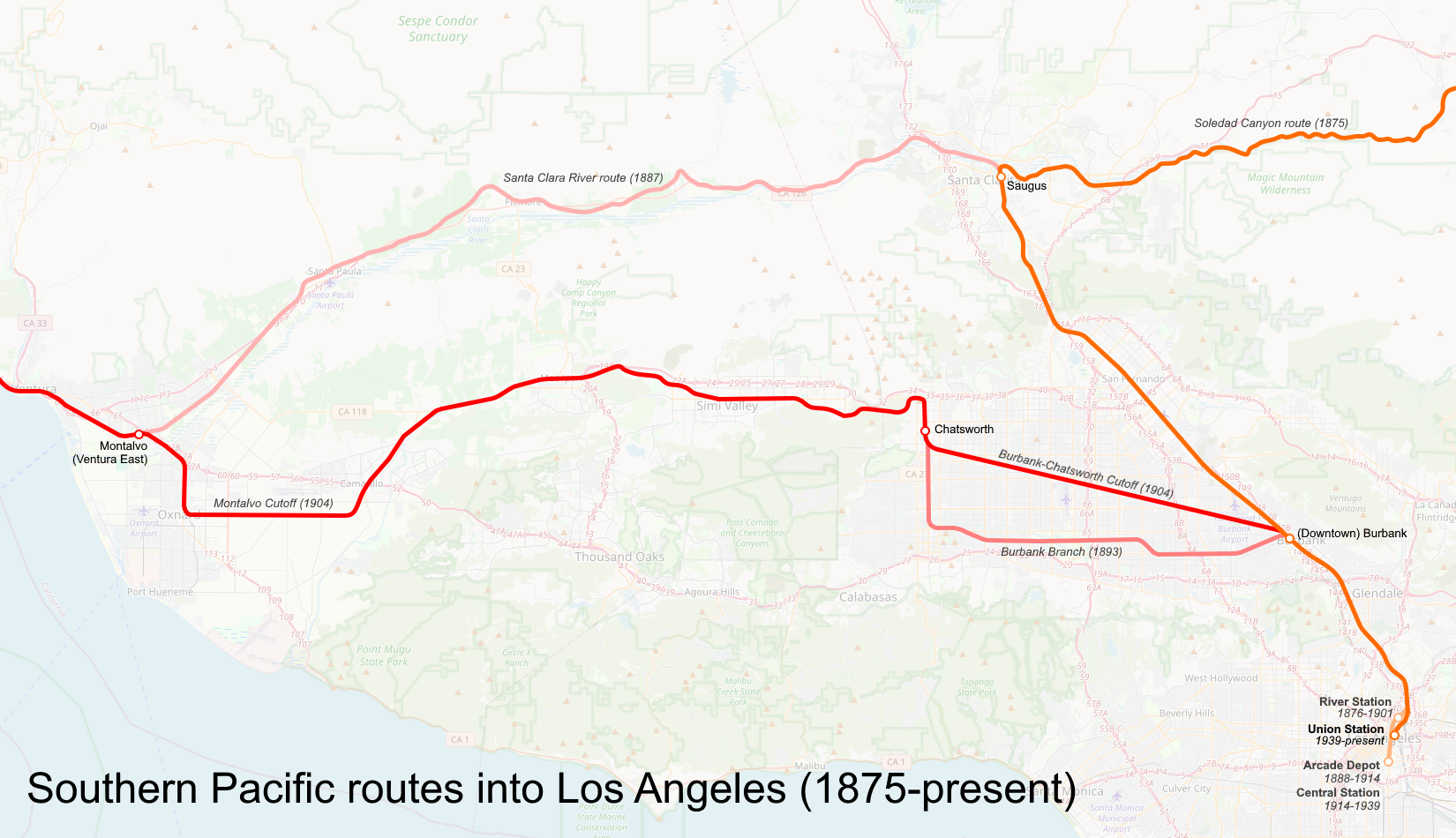
Map of the Southern Pacific Railroad's different routes into Los Angeles from the north

The railway was originally constructed by the Southern Pacific Railroad as their Coast Line, connecting Los Angeles to San Francisco. The Montalvo Cutoff between Burbank and Ventura via the Simi Valley was built in 1904, bypassing the old line further to the north. Caltrans ran commuter rail service over the line very briefly in 1982 and 1983, but CalTrain was unsustainable due to a number of factors.

In 1990 the Los Angeles County Transportation Commission, predecessor of Los Angeles County Metropolitan Transportation Authority, acquired a portion of the right-of-way between Los Angeles and Moorpark from Southern Pacific and transferred it to the newly formed Southern California Regional Rail Authority for commuter service.

The line began operations in 1992 as one of Metrolink's original three routes, with service from Moorpark to Los Angeles Union Station in Downtown Los Angeles. Service was extended to Camarillo and Oxnard in 1994 after the 1994 Northridge earthquake, then to Ventura in 2002.

Because Amtrak trains operate on the same corridor all day, every day, Metrolink did not operate weekend service on the line. As part of a six-month trial program to determine demand, Metrolink added Saturday service on April 6, 2020. Permanent Saturday service started on May 29, 2021, with one round trip between LA Union Station and Moorpark. Service was extended to Ventura–East on August 9, 2021.

Metrolink established a code sharing agreement with Amtrak, allowing all Metrolink passengers to ride select Pacific Surfliner trains with any ticket or pass, starting April 4, 2022. The code sharing agreement adds one more morning and early afternoon trip to Ventura, expanding midday and Saturday service, and establishing de facto Sunday service on the line.

=== Accidents ===
==== 2008 Chatsworth train collision ====
At 4:23 p.m. on September 12, 2008, 25 people were killed in a collision between Metrolink commuter train 111 and a freight train. At least 130 people were injured, with at least one dying later at a hospital. The crash occurred on the Ventura County Line near Heather Lee Lane, south of the Ronald Reagan Freeway (SR-118) and east of Topanga Canyon Boulevard. Both locomotives, the leading car of the commuter train, and seven cars of the freight train were derailed.

==== 2015 Oxnard train derailment ====
On February 24, 2015, according to Oxnard Police Sergeant Denise Shadinger, a Metrolink commuter train traveling from Ventura County to Los Angeles hit a road vehicle near Oxnard, California; she initially said there was an unspecified number of injuries. The incident was reported at 5:44 a.m. Three cars derailed, at least one vehicle was fully engulfed at some point, and the three derailed cars were on their sides; the locomotive was still upright. Little but scorched, mangled wreckage in an intersection and on the tracks was left of the truck; Oxnard Fire Department battalion chief Sergio Martinez said the driver fled the scene unhurt but was found and taken into custody. News helicopters and footage from ABC affiliate KABC showed footage of triage tarps lying in the 5th Street (SR 34) where on-scene firefighters were treating victims and monitoring the scene. The National Transportation Safety Board (NTSB), in a tweet, acknowledged the incident and stated they were launching an investigation. The train engineer died a week later and 29 others were injured. A week after the incident, an Amtrak train collided with a vehicle in the same area as the first crash.

== Potential expansion ==
The Santa Barbara County Association of Governments is interested in expanding Metrolink service into the county. Following a meeting on May 8, 2024, the agency's board of directors directed its staff toward preparing a formal agreement with Ventura County. The proposed one-year pilot program would add an early-morning northbound train between Moorpark and Goleta with intermediate stops at Camarillo, Oxnard, Ventura, Carpinteria, and Santa Barbara, as well a mid-morning southbound return train with the same intermediate stops but also continuing nonstop to L.A. Union Station. The Goleta extension was scheduled to open in January 2026 but was canceled in December 2025 due to the Union Pacific Railroad (the owner of the Coast Line) not entering negotiations due to its ongoing plans to acquire the Norfolk Southern Railway.

Dreamstar Lines, a separate passenger service, is planned to share the Ventura County Line for services between Los Angeles and San Francisco.

== Stations ==
Station	Connections	Location	
Ventura–East		Ventura	Ventura County
Oxnard	Amtrak: Coast Starlight, Pacific Surfliner	Oxnard	Ventura County
Camarillo	Amtrak: Pacific Surfliner	Camarillo	Ventura County
Moorpark	Amtrak: Pacific Surfliner	Moorpark	Ventura County
Simi Valley	Amtrak: Coast Starlight, Pacific Surfliner	Simi Valley	Ventura County
Chatsworth	Amtrak: Pacific Surfliner; Metro: G Line	Chatsworth	Los Angeles County
Northridge		Northridge	Los Angeles County
Van Nuys	Amtrak: Coast Starlight, Pacific Surfliner	Van Nuys	Los Angeles County
Burbank Airport–South	Amtrak: Coast Starlight, Pacific Surfliner; Walkway to Hollywood Burbank Airport	Burbank	Los Angeles County
Downtown Burbank	Metrolink: Antelope Valley	Burbank	Los Angeles County
Glendale	Metrolink: Antelope Valley; Amtrak: Pacific Surfliner	Glendale	Los Angeles County
L.A. Union Station	Metrolink: 91/Perris Valley Antelope Valley Orange County Riverside San Bernardino; Amtrak: Coast Starlight, Pacific Surfliner, Southwest Chief, Sunset Limited, Texas Eagle; Metro: FlyAway to LAX	Los Angeles	Los Angeles County
