= CalTrain (Los Angeles) =

Former commuter train service in Los Angeles, United States

Overview
- Service type: Commuter rail
- Status: Discontinued
- First service: October 18, 1982
- Last service: March 1, 1983
- Successor: Ventura County Line
- Former operators: Southern Pacific Railroad; Caltrans; Amtrak

Route
- Termini: Union Station; Oxnard
- Stops: 6
- Average journey time: 1 hour 40 minutes
- Service frequency: Two weekday round-trips
- Train number: 101–104
- Line used: Coast Line

Technical
- Track gauge: 4 ft 8 1/2 in (1,435 mm)
- Track owner: Southern Pacific

CalTrain was a short-lived commuter rail system in the Los Angeles area which operated between 1982–1983. It connected downtown Los Angeles's Union Station with Oxnard in Ventura County, using the tracks of the Southern Pacific Railroad. It was the first local rail service in Los Angeles since 1961 and was a forerunner of the modern Metrolink Ventura County Line. Service ended in the face of high costs, lower-than-expected ridership, a changing political climate, and staunch opposition from the Southern Pacific.

== History ==
CalTrain had its gestation in a 1973 study by the Southern California Association of Governments (SCAG), which recommended two daily roundtrips between Union Station and Oxnard. The train would use the Southern Pacific's Coast Line. Amtrak already operated a single long-distance train, the Coast Starlight, over the route. SP objected to the proposal, alleging that the service would disrupt freight service on the single-track line, leading to a protracted dispute before the California Public Utilities Commission (PUC). The PUC ruled against the SP several times, with a final order in June 1982, ordering that SP operate the service beginning on October 18.

Caltrans provided funding of $6 million for the service. Some of the money was to be spent on capital improvements, such as new station platforms. These would be located on Southern Pacific (SP) territory, prompting additional litigation between SP, Caltrans, and the PUC. The SP challenged the authority of the transportation agencies to construct these platforms on its property without its consent. After a ruling by the Supreme Court of California in favor of Caltrans the service proceeded, with the start date unchanged. It was the first local rail service in Los Angeles since Pacific Electric discontinued operations on April 8, 1961.

CalTrain faced serious problems almost immediately. George Deukmejian replaced Jerry Brown as Governor of California on January 3, 1983. Deukmejian favored highway projects over public transit, and showed no enthusiasm for what many called a "pet project" of the former governor. Daily ridership stood at 300–350 passengers, disappointing Caltrans officials who hoped for 2,600 daily riders. Additional issues remained in the disagreement between the state and the SP over the tariff that the state should pay to the SP for the use of its infrastructure. The state, together with local governments, was prepared to pay between $70,000-100,000 per month, while the SP insisted on a higher figure of $588,000. By February $200,000 remained of the original $6 million allocation, which did not include the $2–3 million potentially owed the SP should its figure be upheld.

Service ended on March 2, 1983, after storms damaged a trestle. On March 11, the PUC indefinitely suspended the service - which was to be restored on March 14 - due to the dispute between Caltrans and the SP. The SP was ordered not to "remove or modify" the platforms and parking areas at the former stations.

The tariff dispute was further litigated, with the Interstate Commerce Commission eventually ruling in 1985 in favor of the SP. This ruling ended attempts to resurrect commuter rail service in southern California until Metrolink began operation with the opening of the Ventura County Line on October 26, 1992, in which they assumed ownership of the corridor.

Three years later, service was gradually restored to the former CalTrain route which would continue over the next eight years. The Coast Starlight (which still served Glendale and Oxnard) added a Simi Valley stop on October 26, 1986. On June 26, 1988, Amtrak extended one daily San Diegan round trip to Santa Barbara, restoring service to Van Nuys (Panorama City) and Chatsworth; a Burbank Airport stop was added in 1990. Metrolink Ventura County Line service began on October 26, 1992, stopping at all former CalTrain stations (except Oxnard, which Metrolink began serving after the 1994 Northridge earthquake).

== Equipment ==
Los Angeles County refused to allow the use of its El Camino equipment, then stored at Bell, so Caltrans looked elsewhere. Throughout its short history CalTrain's equipment situation remained in flux. Initially CalTrain used GE P30CH diesel locomotives and single-level Amfleet coaches leased from Amtrak. Caltrans then leased four bilevel coaches from Chicago's Regional Transportation Authority to replace the Amfleet coaches. These had barely entered service before the SP ordered all P30CHs in the country sidelined because of a derailment in Texas. CalTrain had to use EMD GP9s and bilevel coaches from the SP's Peninsula Commute equipment pool. The Chicago cars could now not be used because they required head end power (HEP) for heating and the SP's locomotives used steam heat, which was not compatible.

== Station stops ==
When service began in 1982 intermediate stops included Simi Valley, Panorama City, and Glendale. Planned additional stops included Camarillo, Moorpark, Chatsworth, Northridge, Burbank Airport, and Burbank. Chatsworth opened on December 29, 1982. Service to Moorpark began in early 1983; service to Burbank Airport began in February 1983, just prior to the service's discontinuance.
