= Oxnard Transit Center =

Train and bus station in Oxnard, California, US

Oxnard, CA
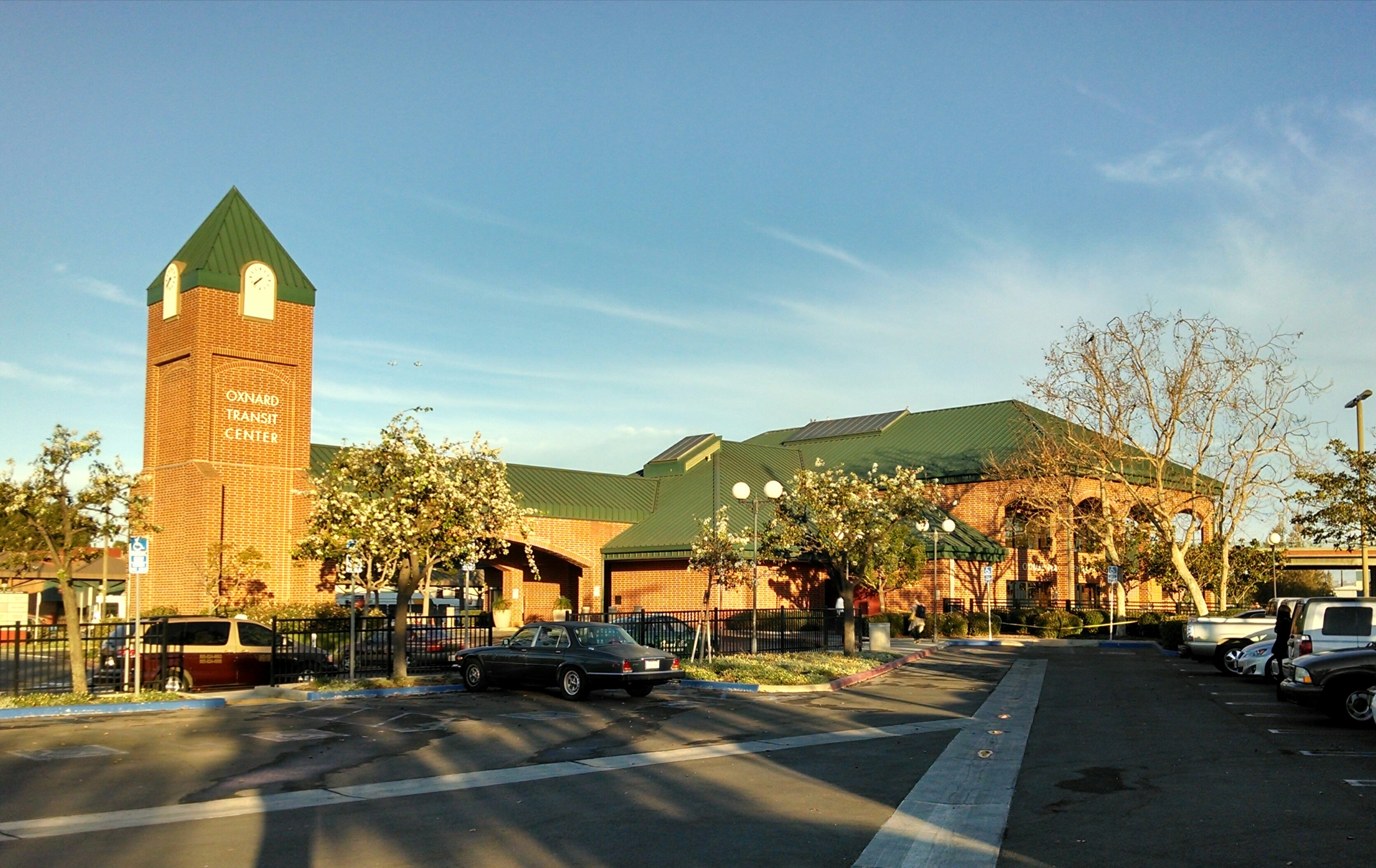
- Morning view from the southeast of the station in 2014

General information
- Other names: Oxnard Transit Center
- Location: 201 East Fourth Street; Oxnard, California; United States
- Coordinates: 34°11′58″N 119°10′34″W
- Owner: City of Oxnard
- Line: UP Santa Barbara Subdivision
- Platforms: 1 side platform
- Tracks: 2
- Bus routes: Amtrak Thruway: 10; Gold Coast Transit; Greyhound Lines; FlixBus
- Bus stands: 16

Construction
- Parking: 110 spaces, 3 accessible spaces
- Cycle facilities: Racks, lockers
- Accessible: Yes
- Architect: Joan Briggs

Other information
- Status: Staffed, station building with waiting room
- Station code: Amtrak: OXN

History
- Opened: 1987
- Former names: Oxnard Transportation Center

Passengers
- FY 2025: 92,195 annually (Amtrak)
- FY 2026: 106 weekday boardings (Metrolink)

Services
Preceding station	Amtrak	Following station
Santa Barbara toward Seattle	Coast Starlight	Simi Valley toward Los Angeles
Ventura toward San Luis Obispo	Pacific Surfliner	Camarillo toward San Diego
Preceding station	Metrolink	Following station
Ventura–East Terminus	Ventura County Line	Camarillo toward L.A. Union Station
Former services
Preceding station	Amtrak	Following station
Santa Barbara toward Sacramento	Spirit of California 1981–1983	Glendale toward Los Angeles
Preceding station	Southern Pacific Railroad	Following station
El Rio toward San Francisco	Coast Line	Leesdale toward Los Angeles
Location

The Oxnard Transit Center (formerly Oxnard Transportation Center) is an intermodal transit center in downtown Oxnard, California. It is served by Amtrak Coast Starlight and Pacific Surfliner intercity service plus Metrolink Ventura County Line commuter service.

== Service ==
Oxnard Transit Center is served by 10 Amtrak Pacific Surfliner trains (5 in each direction) every day and 2 Coast Starlight trains (1 in each direction), with departures evenly spaced throughout the day. 6 Metrolink Ventura County Line trains (3 in each direction) serve the station each weekday, running during peak hours in the peak direction of travel. On weekends, 4 Metrolink Ventura County Line trains (2 in each direction) serve the station. Metrolink passengers also have access to all Pacific Surfliner trains through a codesharing arrangement with Amtrak.

== History ==
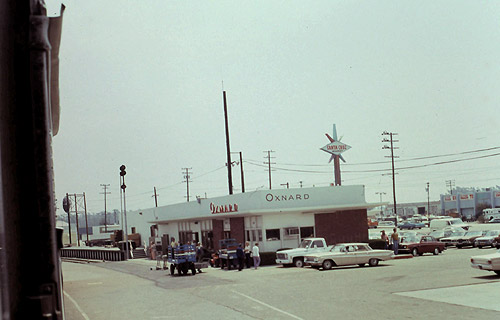
Oxnard station in May 1976

The Southern Pacific Railroad constructed a wye at Montalvo in late 1897 on the original route connecting Ventura to Los Angeles through the Santa Clara River Valley. This spur was needed for shipping construction equipment to the site of a new beet sugar refinery. A wooden railroad trestle and rail line were constructed over the Santa Clara River as the spur headed south, reaching the new settlement here on the relatively isolated coastal plain in April 1898. The rail line turned here from the north–south alignment to east–west towards Camarillo as they continued building the towards Santa Susana in the Simi Valley. With the completion of the Santa Susana Tunnel connecting the line to Burbank, this became the most direct route between Los Angeles and San Francisco. The new settlement was named after the factory owner and in 1904 traffic on the coast railroad line was rerouted through Oxnard.

In 1987, the current station was constructed on the northerly end of the curve while the former station remained at the southerly end. The former Oxnard depot has continued in use as a maintenance and freight yard office by Union Pacific.

Metrolink service started on April 4, 1994, after the Northridge earthquake damaged Simi Valley Freeway and the Federal Emergency Management Agency agreed to temporarily fund the extension of service. The trains were stored overnight in a temporary layover facility in the Montalvo neighborhood of Ventura where the Santa Paula Branch Line, owned by the Ventura County Transportation Commission, connects to the Coast Line.
