= San Luis Obispo station =

Railway station in San Luis Obispo, California, US

San Luis Obispo, CA
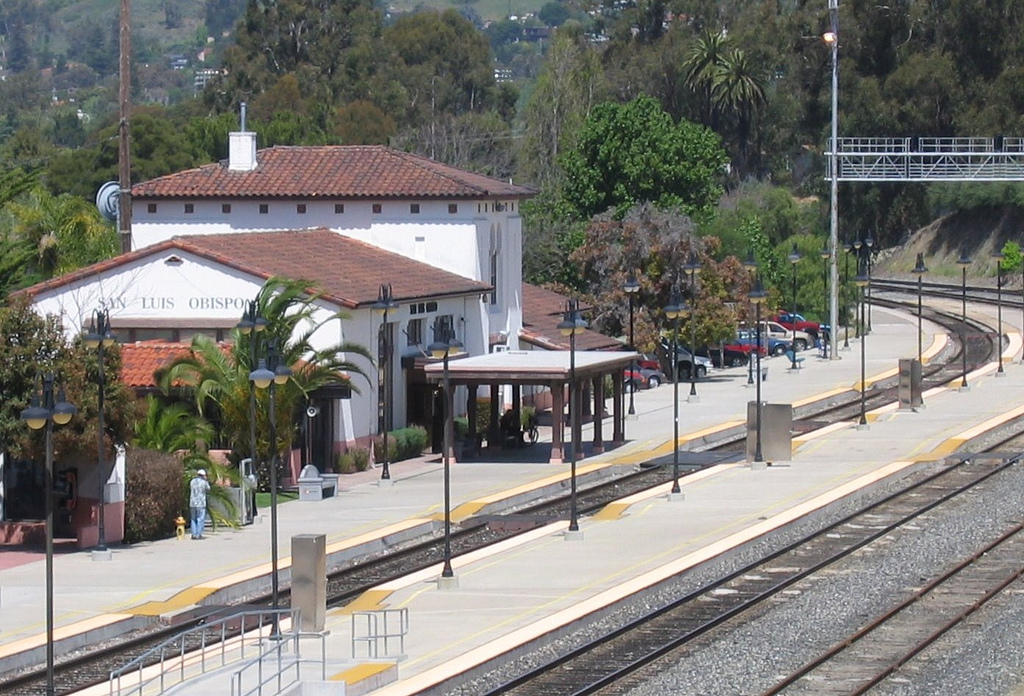
- San Luis Obispo station in 2007

General information
- Location: 1011 Railroad Avenue; San Luis Obispo, California; United States
- Coordinates: 35°16′35″N 120°39′17″W
- Owner: Union Pacific Railroad
- Operator: Amtrak
- Line: UP Santa Barbara Subdivision
- Platforms: 1 side platform, 1 island platform
- Tracks: 2
- Connections: Amtrak Thruway: 17, 18, 21; SLO Transit: 3B

Construction
- Parking: Yes
- Accessible: Yes
- Architectural style: Spanish Colonial Revival architecture

Other information
- Status: Staffed, station building with waiting room
- Station code: Amtrak: SLO

History
- Opened: May 4, 1894
- Rebuilt: January 1942–September 5, 1943
- Original company: Southern Pacific

Passengers
- FY 2025: 91,566 (Amtrak)

Services
Preceding station	Amtrak	Following station
Paso Robles toward Seattle	Coast Starlight	Santa Barbara toward Los Angeles
Terminus	Pacific Surfliner	Grover Beach toward San Diego
Former services
Preceding station	Amtrak	Following station
Salinas toward Sacramento	Spirit of California	Santa Barbara toward Los Angeles
Preceding station	Southern Pacific Railroad	Following station
Santa Margarita toward San Francisco	Coast Line	Pismo Beach toward Los Angeles
Preceding station	Pacific Coast Railway	Following station
San Luis Obispo toward Port San Luis	Main Line	Steele's toward Los Olivos
Location

San Luis Obispo station is an Amtrak intercity rail station in the city of San Luis Obispo, California, United States. It has one side platform and one island platform serving the two tracks of the Coast Line.

San Luis Obispo station is served by 4 Amtrak Pacific Surfliner trains (2 in each direction) and 2 Coast Starlight trains (1 in each direction).

In fiscal year 2025, 91,566 passengers boarded or detrained at San Luis Obispo station.

== History ==
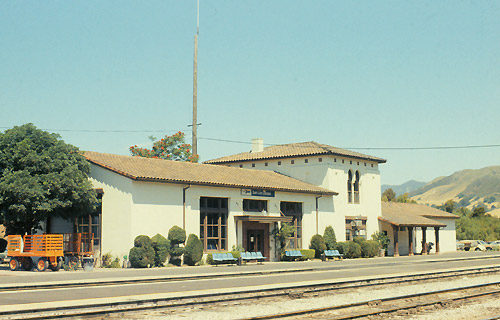
San Luis Obispo station in September 1987

The present Spanish Colonial Revival architecture style depot was built by the Southern Pacific Railroad and opened on September 5, 1943. It replaced the original SP depot, located just south of the current one, which opened on May 4, 1894. After the present depot opened, the former depot was then used for freight until it was shuttered in 1968. It was demolished to make room for a parking lot in 1971.

For most of Amtrak's first three decades, the station was only served by the Coast Starlight, which ran southbound in the afternoon and northbound in mid-morning. In 1995, Amtrak and CalTrans extended the San Diegan all the way to San Luis Obispo. That route had long been a Los Angeles–San Diego service, but had been extended up the Central Coast to provide that region with additional service to Los Angeles. The San Diegan was rebranded as the Pacific Surfliner five years later.

The station has room for a single Surfliner passenger train adjacent to the station to hold overnight for a morning departure from San Luis Obispo. The Los Angeles – San Diego – San Luis Obispo (LOSSAN) Rail Corridor Agency is planning an expanded facility on the Union Pacific property just south of the station. This property still contains the foundation of the Southern Pacific roundhouse and the pit where the turntable resided until 1994. The proposed layout of the CCLF would require destruction of most of these historic landmarks, and prevent the future rebuilding of the railroad facility for historic and public use. The proposed additional storage and maintenance capacity will also allow a second train to layover and provide for future expansion of service.

== See also ==
- City of San Luis Obispo Historic Resources
