= San Diegan (train) =

Passenger train

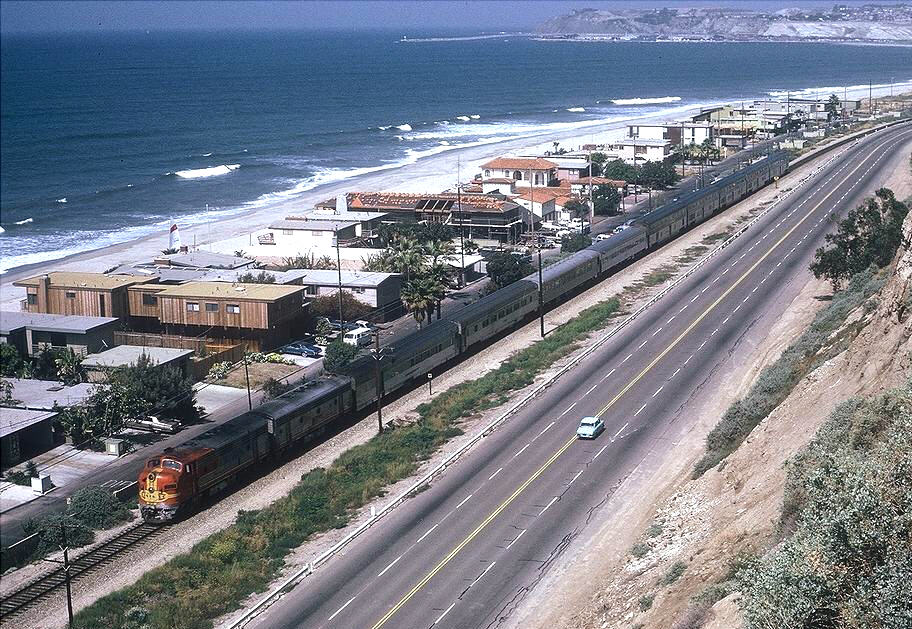
- The southbound San Diegan passes through Capistrano Beach, California in April 1973

Overview
- Service type: Inter-city rail
- Status: Discontinued
- Locale: Southern California
- First service: March 27, 1938
- Last service: June 1, 2000
- Successor: Pacific Surfliner
- Former operators: Atchison, Topeka and Santa Fe Railway (1938–1971); Amtrak (1971–2000)

Route
- Termini: Los Angeles, California; San Diego, California
- Stops: 16 (total)

Technical
- Track gauge: 4 ft 8 1/2 in (1,435 mm)
- Track owners: ATSF Railway (to the 1990s); BNSF Railway (from 1996); Metrolink/OCTA (in Orange County, from 1991); North County Transit District (in San Diego County, from 1991); North of Los Angeles (from 1988): Southern Pacific Railroad (to 1991/1996); Metrolink (in Ventura County, from 1991); Union Pacific Railroad (north of Moorpark, from 1996)

The San Diegan was one of the named passenger trains of the Atchison, Topeka and Santa Fe Railway, and a “workhorse” of the railroad. Its 126-mile (203-kilometer) route ran from Los Angeles, California, south to San Diego. It was assigned train Nos. 70–79 (Nos. 80–83 were added in 1952 when RDCs began operating on the line).

The Los Angeles-San Diego corridor was to the Santa Fe what the New York City–Philadelphia corridor was to the Pennsylvania Railroad. Daily traffic could reach a density of ten trains (each way) during the summer months. From the Los Angeles/Orange County border to San Diego, it ran along the Surf Line (officially, the Fourth District of the Los Angeles Division), which was so named because much of its trackage came within fewer than 100 feet of the Pacific Ocean.

The first San Diegan ran on March 27, 1938, as one set of equipment making two round trips a day. A second trainset delivered in 1941 made possible four streamlined trains each way. A set of heavyweight equipment made a fifth trip in each direction. During and after World War II, furlough business from San Diego's military bases necessitated extra (albeit heavyweight) sections of San Diegans, and racetrack specials during horseracing season at Del Mar added to passenger train miles.

Amtrak continued to operate the San Diegan when it took over operation of the nation's passenger service on May 1, 1971. After extending the route to the Central Coast in the 1980s and 1990s, Amtrak rebranded the route as the Pacific Surfliner on June 1, 2000.

== History ==
=== Background ===
Construction of the Surf Line between Los Angeles and San Diego began on October 12, 1880, with the organization of the California Southern Railroad Company. On January 2, 1882, the California Southern commenced passenger and freight service between National City and Fallbrook Junction, just north of Oceanside. The Santa Fe assumed control of the California Southern and on August 12, 1888, completed the line between Los Angeles and San Diego. Initially known as the "Short Line", the route replaced the Santa Fe's existing circuitous route via Temecula Canyon. In the 1930s the Surf Line hosted four round-trips per day, with an average trip time of 3 1/2 hours.

=== San Diegan ===
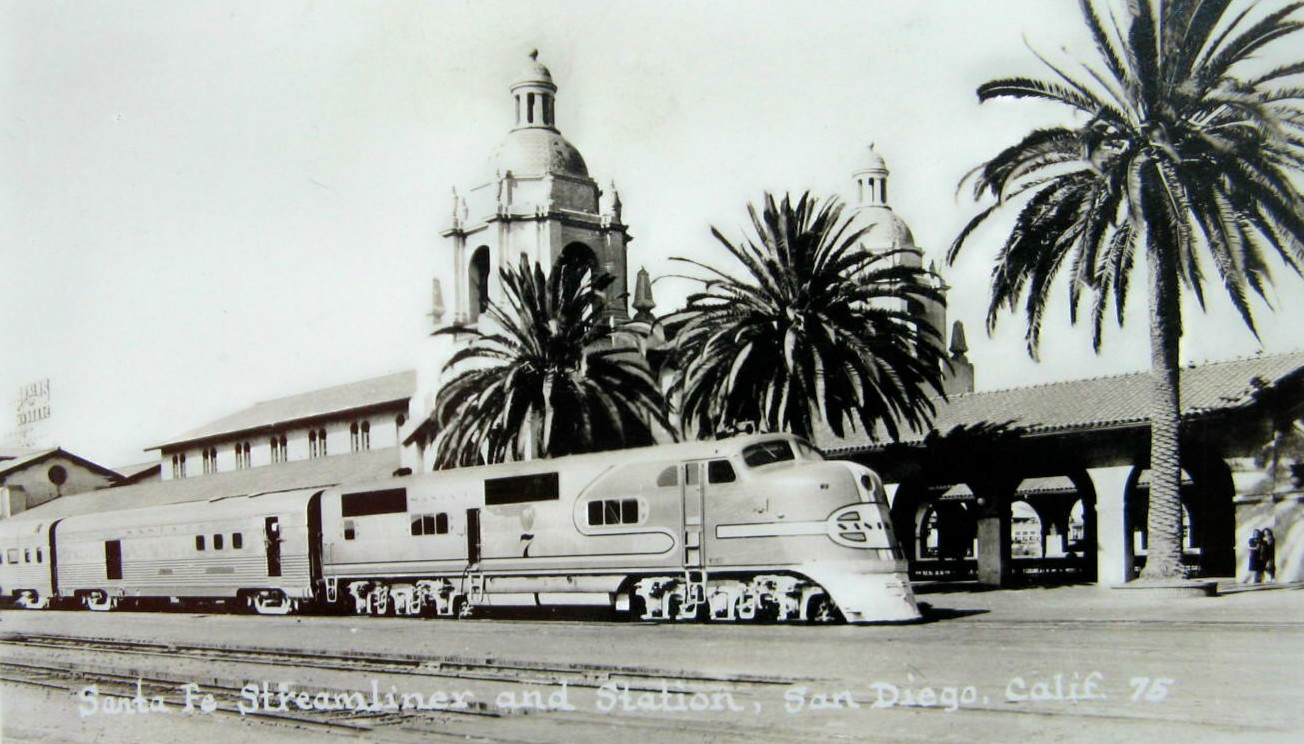
Santa Fe San Diegan at the San Diego depot (1945 postcard)

In the late 1930s streamlined trains were in transition. While fixed consists such as the Union Pacific Railroad's M-10000 were out (the last, the Illinois Central 121, had been built in 1936), railroads still ordered sets of equipment with the intention that those sets stay with a particular train. In 1937–1938, the Santa Fe embarked on a massive program to upgrade its passenger fleet: it introduced new sets on the Chief, Super Chief and El Capitan, and added three new trains — the Chicagoan, Kansas Cityan, and the San Diegan.

On March 27, 1938, the Santa Fe inaugurated the San Diegan, operating on a schedule of 2 1/2 hours. The single equipment set could make two round-trips per day. A second San Diegan consist entered service on June 8, 1941, doubling the schedule to four daily round trips. The San Diegan was supplemented by two conventional heavyweight trains.

- December 31, 1940: Engine No. 1676, a 2-10-2 type locomotive in charge of Train 135, the "Night Coast," is bound for Los Angeles with a 40-car freight when it derails just after 9:00 p.m. and goes over a bluff south of Del Mar, with 8 freight cars following suit. Nine additional cars were derailed but did not fall. Three members of the engine crew were killed in the accident, and many days passed before all of the wreckage could be retrieved; only one car actually ended up on the beach near the water. It was determined that water seepage had undermined the trackbed where the incident took place, causing the rails to spread.
- June 8, 1941: A second lightweight train consisting of six coaches, a baggage-mail car, a tavern lunch-counter car, and a round-end observation car is added to the line. Service is increased to four daily round trips with streamliners and one round trip using conventional equipment.
- October 27, 1941: A fifth, steam-powered train is added to the schedule, due in part to the need to transport military personnel to and from San Diego's bases. This semi-streamlined train carries a full buffet car, a diner, and three coaches that had all previously run as the Valley Flyer between Oakland and Bakersfield. The number of daily trains servicing the route increases to 16, on average.
- 1942: The average number of trains per day increases to 42. Consist size expands to 13 cars, and each logs 512 daily miles. Trains consisting of 10-12 former Southern Pacific interurban trailer cars, owned by the U.S. Maritime Commission but bearing ATSF markings, are fitted with conventional knuckle couplers at each end of the trainset and pressed into service to handle the additional passenger loads.
- April 1943: The schedule is lengthened to three hours due to ever-increasing military movements.
- May 10, 1943: Santa Fe adds a second mainline track along the San Diego line between La Mirada and Fullerton to accommodate increased wartime traffic. Centralized Traffic Control (CTC) is installed on the line.
- May 21, 1952: The Santa Fe places two Budd Rail Diesel Cars, Nos. DC191 and DC192, into service. The two cars, coupled together, make two daily round trips. One of these is a non-stop express service timed at 2 hours 15 minutes.
- August 25, 1953: Santa Fe 3751 pulls the last steam-powered trains (Nos. 72 and 73) on the "Surf Line."
- January 10, 1954: The use of round-end observation cars is discontinued in order to eliminate the need to "turn" the trains in San Diego before heading northward.
- January 22, 1956: Redondo Junction train wreck. Bound for San Diego, the two RDCs (making up train No. 82) derail at 69 mph in an evening high-speed accident at Redondo Junction, California, just south of the Los Angeles Union Passenger Terminal (LAUPT), killing 30 and seriously injuring 117. This accident ended the units' run on the "Surf Line." The radio reports of the accident were one of the first major uses of the Sigalert (known at the time as a "Sigmon Traffic Alert").
- March 1956: General Motors' Aerotrain makes a series of experimental runs as a San Diegan consist. Thoughts of placing it in permanent service are quickly abandoned as the entire train set has to be turned at each end of the line, and requires helper locomotives on the Sorrento Grade.
- April 28, 1956: Heavyweight local trains Nos. 70 and 75 are discontinued due to losses.
- Summer 1956: Santa Fe's El Capitan makes three demonstration runs to San Diego to promote its new "Hi-Level" cars. The railroad begins placing illuminated drumheads (formerly mounted on round-end observation cars) on the vestibule gate of the trailing cars of the San Diegan. Service on the line is reduced to six daily round trips.
- Summer 1958: Service is further reduced to five daily round trips and weekend extra trains.
- November 19, 1958: An F4D Skyray fighter jet overshoots the runway at Marine Corps Air Station El Toro and is struck by southbound train No. 74 at 75 miles (121 km)-per-hour. All three locomotive units and cars #3430, #3165, #3144, #1399, #3100, #3094, #3082 derail. No fatalities and only a few injuries result.
- January 14, 1959: Locomotive #20C, leading train No. 75 through a blinding fog, collides with a heavy truck at a grade crossing in Irvine; the unit sustains considerable damage and is "set out" to be picked up for repairs. Multiple automotive mishaps also result from the heavy fog in the immediate vicinity.
- December 4, 1959: A few minutes before 12:30 a.m., freight train 136, the eastbound "Night Coast," is on the mainline heading for San Diego when the westbound "SBX" (San Bernardino Extra) leaves the San Juan Capistrano siding without dispatcher permission. Engine Nos. 259 and 269 (both of the EMD F7 type) are damaged in the resulting collision, with several cars derailed.
- July 31, 1964: Mail trains Nos. 70 and 81 are dropped as all mail between Los Angeles and San Diego is now transported via truck (Santa Fe's mail contract expired on July 1 and was not renewed).
- 1965: Service is further reduced to three daily round trips (train Nos. 73–78) on a two‑hour‑and‑55‑minute schedule.
- December 22, 1965: a San Diego-bound San Diegan collides with a fully loaded gravel truck at the State College Boulevard grade crossing in Anaheim. The long nose of the lead Alco PA unit is credited with saving the lives of the engine crew, but is so badly damaged that it has to be written off and scrapped. Including locomotive units 61L and 51C, cars #3084, #3156, #3152, #3179, and #3076 all derail.
- February 11, 1967: In heavy fog, a San Diego-bound San Diegan slams into an Orange County rubbish truck at the Fruit Street crossing on its approach to the Santa Ana Depot. There is no derailment but 8 passengers were injured from flying glass.

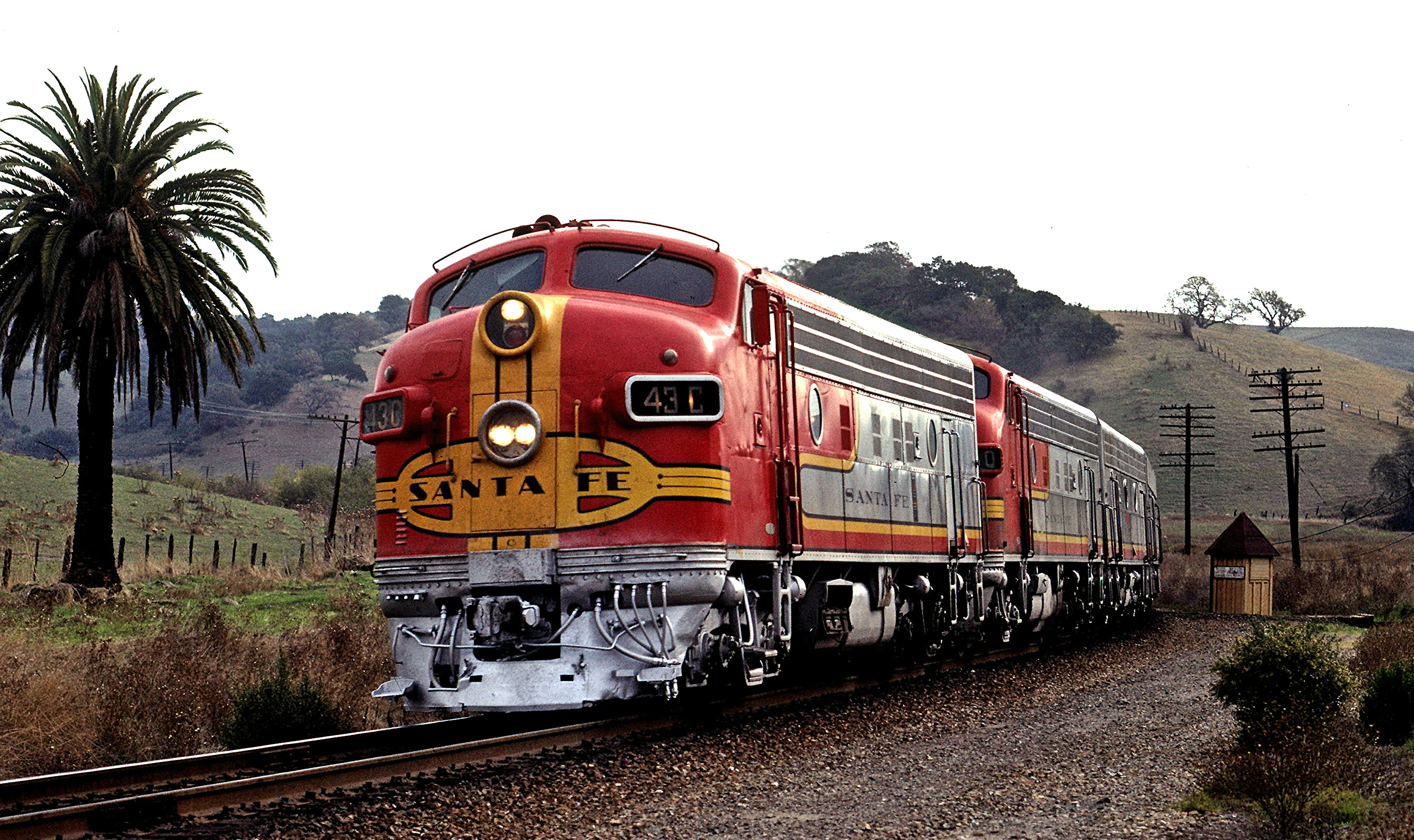
ATSF EMD F7 in classic Warbonnet livery, leading the San Diegan, heading South near Miramar, California 1973

=== Amtrak ===
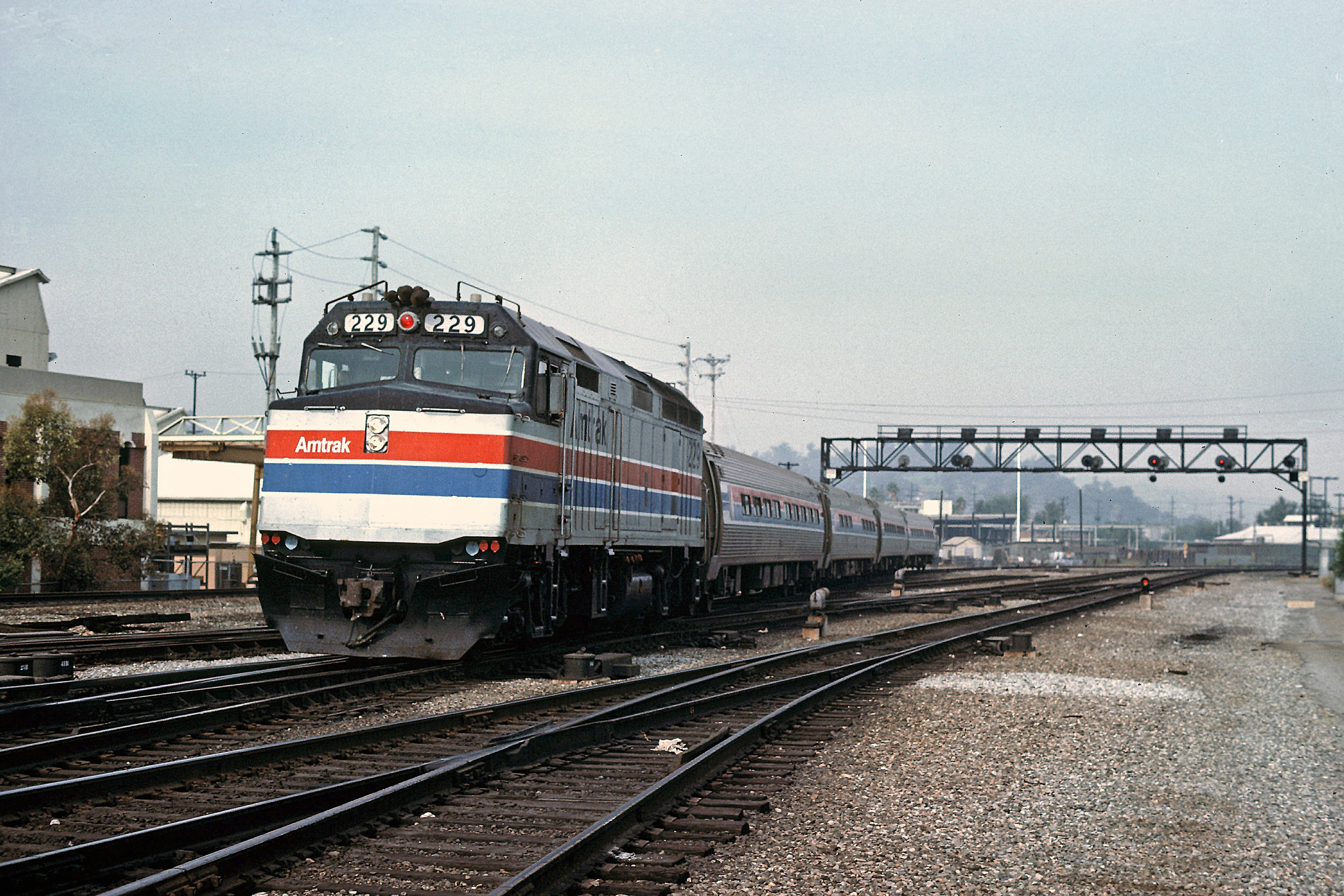
An EMD F40PH leads a San Diegan into Union Station in Los Angeles in 1978.

Amtrak assumed control of most intercity passenger trains in the United States on May 1, 1971. It retained two of the San Diegan's three round-trips. Between November 1971–April 1972 the long-distance Coast Daylight/Coast Starlight operated along the entire length of the Pacific Coast from Seattle to San Diego. The Daylight/Starlight was cut back to Los Angeles in April, and Amtrak restored the third San Diegan round trip to maintain the same level of service along the corridor Beginning in 1976 the state of California funded additional service: a fourth round-trip on September 1, 1976, a fifth on April 24, 1977, a sixth on February 14, 1978, and a seventh on October 26, 1980. Between April 29, 1984, and April 28, 1985, Amtrak experimented with an express service between Los Angeles and San Diego. This was targeted at business customers and made fewer stops than the regular San Diegan trains. Dubbed Metroliner after the high-speed service on the Northeast Corridor, it was unpopular and suffered from low ridership. After its discontinuance Amtrak restored the seventh San Diegan and introduced Custom class on the route.

- June 26, 1988: One round trip per day is extended north to Santa Barbara.
- 1995: One round trip extends as far north as San Luis Obispo.
- July 1996: The IC3 Flexliner is put into two-week trial service during the height of the Del Mar horse racing season.
- November 1998: An eleventh daily round trip is added.
- June 1, 2000: The train is renamed the Pacific Surfliner, with eleven round trips from San Diego to Los Angeles. Five continue to Santa Barbara, and two continue to San Luis Obispo.

== Equipment used ==
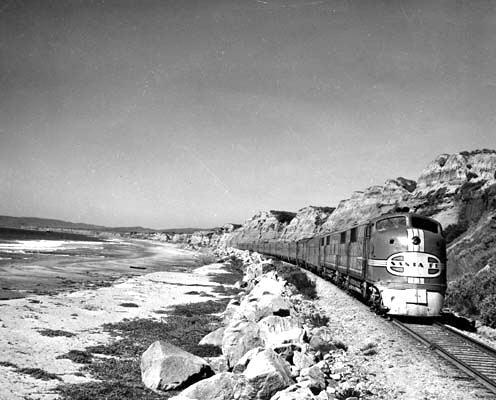
The San Diegan, led by a pair of EMC E1 locomotives, rolls south along the Pacific Coast through San Clemente.

The original San Diegan consist included a baggage car, two coaches (60 seats each), a lunch counter-tavern car, and a parlor-observation car. Motive power consisted of a single 1,800 hp (1,300 kW) EMC E1A locomotive sporting the familiar Warbonnet paint scheme. These units would, in time, be replaced by ALCO PA and PB power and EMD F3 and F7 locomotives. Santa Fe's lone trio of Fairbanks-Morse (FM) "Erie-built" locomotives and the odd GE U28CG could also be seen occasionally running the line.

A lone pair of 90-seat self-powered Budd Rail Diesel Cars (RDCs) were acquired for express service. They operated "back-to-back" as a single train unit from May 21, 1952, until the Redondo Junction derailment on January 22, 1956.

Three additional coach units were added for weekend traffic. The San Diegan also enjoyed almost exclusive use of Santa Fe's "pendulum-suspension" chair car, No. 1100, after World War II.

In June 1941, the railroad added a second eight-car trainset, also built by Budd, to handle the high demand. Its original consist was similar to the above save for an additional coach. Subsequent consists varied according to traffic levels.

A representative, all-lightweight consist from the Summer of 1955:

- Baggage-Mail car
- RPO-Baggage car
- "Chair" car / Coach (52 seats)
- "Chair" car / Coach (52 seats)
- "Chair" car / Coach (52 seats)
- "Chair" car / Coach (52 seats)
- Bar-Lounge-"Chair" car (#1398-#1399 assigned)
- "Chair" car / Coach (52 seats)
- "Chair" car / Coach (52 seats)
- "Chair" car / Coach (52 seats)
- "Chair" car / Coach (52 seats)

Under Amtrak ex-Santa Fe Hi-Level coaches were used in the early 1970s. Modern Amfleet coaches arrived in 1976. For a six-month period in 1978 service on the route was supplemented by the El Camino cars owned by Los Angeles County.

== Route and station stops ==
- Los Angeles Union Station
- Norwalk
- Fullerton
- Anaheim
- Orange
- Santa Ana
- Irvine
- San Juan Capistrano
- San Clemente
- Oceanside
- Carlsbad
- Encinitas
- Del Mar
- Linda Vista
- Old Town
- Santa Fe Depot

== See also ==
- Amtrak Pacific Surfliner
- Passenger train service on the Atchison, Topeka and Santa Fe Railway
- California and the railroads
