= Fillmore station (Southern Pacific Railroad) =

Former railway station in California, USA

Fillmore
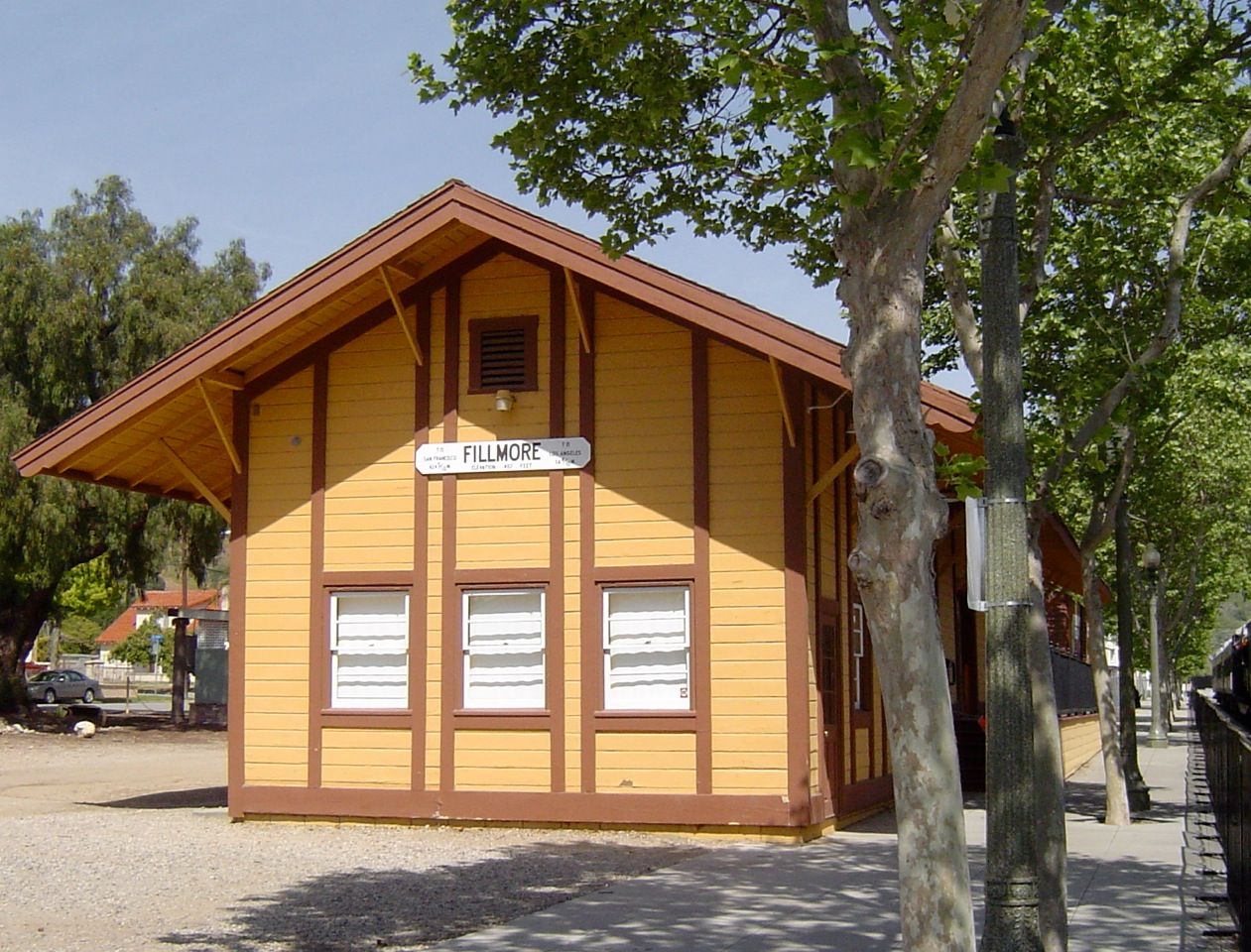

General information
- Location: 447 Main Street; Fillmore, California
- Coordinates: 34.3993°N 118.9104°W
- Line: Santa Paula Branch Line

History
- Opened: 1887
- Closed: 1935
- Original company: Southern Pacific

Former services
Preceding station	Fillmore and Western Railway	Following station
Santa Paula Terminus	Santa Paula Branch Line Closed 2021	Piru Terminus
Preceding station	Southern Pacific Railroad	Following station
Sespe toward Montalvo	Santa Paula Branch	Buckhorn toward Saugus
Location

Fillmore station is a former train station in Fillmore, California. It was built by the Southern Pacific Railroad in 1887 as a stop along its Coast Line between Los Angeles and San Francisco. It served as a nucleus for development, with the town of Fillmore growing around the site. Passenger service ended in 1935, though the building continued to be used for freight operations until 1974.

Facing destruction after falling out of use, Edith Jarrett Roderick purchased the building for $1.05 in March 1974 and had it moved across Main Street where it was turned into a museum. It was listed as a Ventura County Historic Landmarks & Points of Interest in 1979. The 1994 Northridge earthquake caused extensive damage to the building, necessitating repairs which lasted into 1995.

The Fillmore and Western Railway used the former station site as a stop for excursion tours starting in 1995. The turntable was installed in 2011 after it was purchased from the Canadian National Railway.

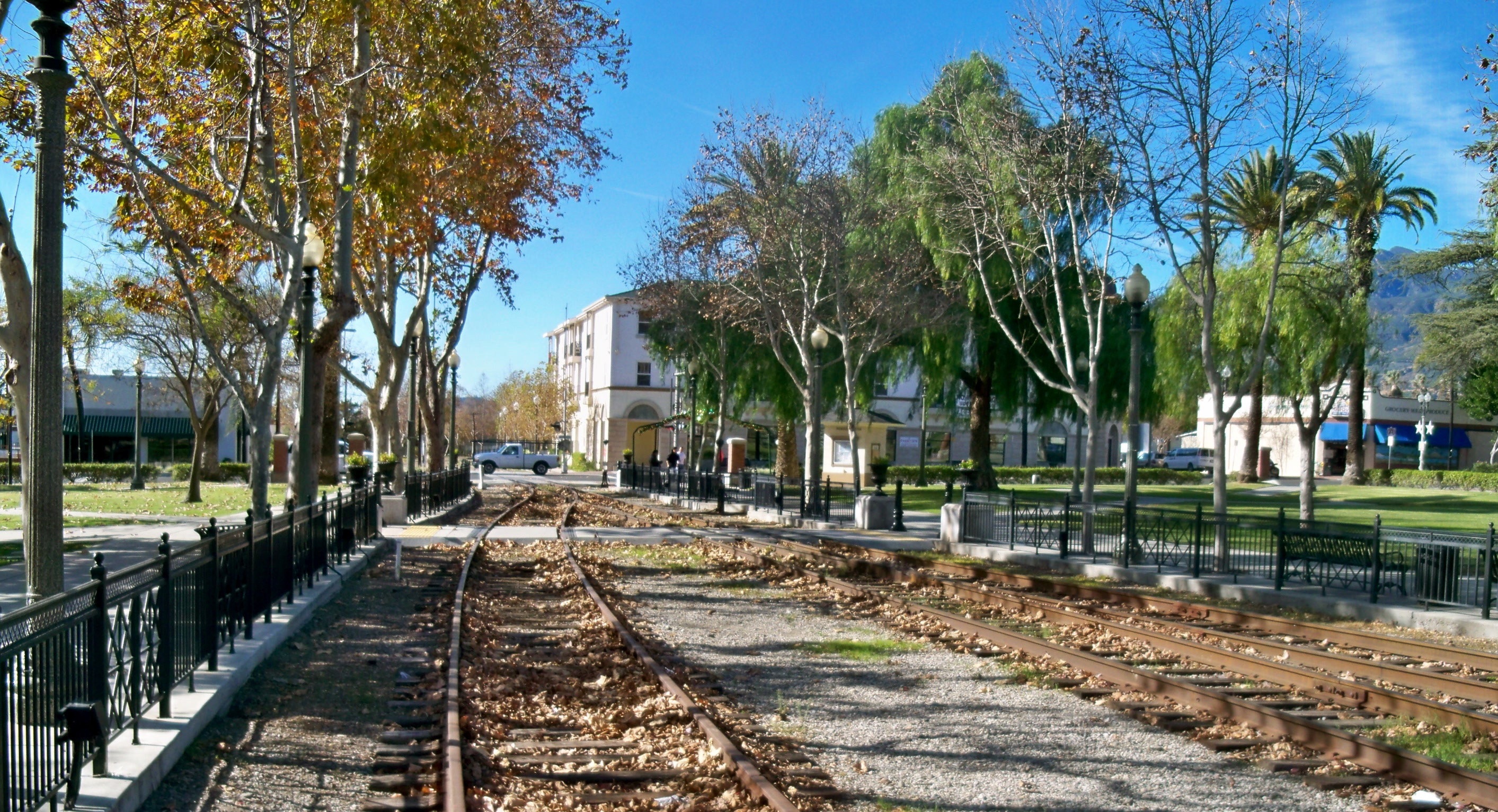
Fillmore and Western station area, 2009
