= Santa Paula station =

Santa Paula
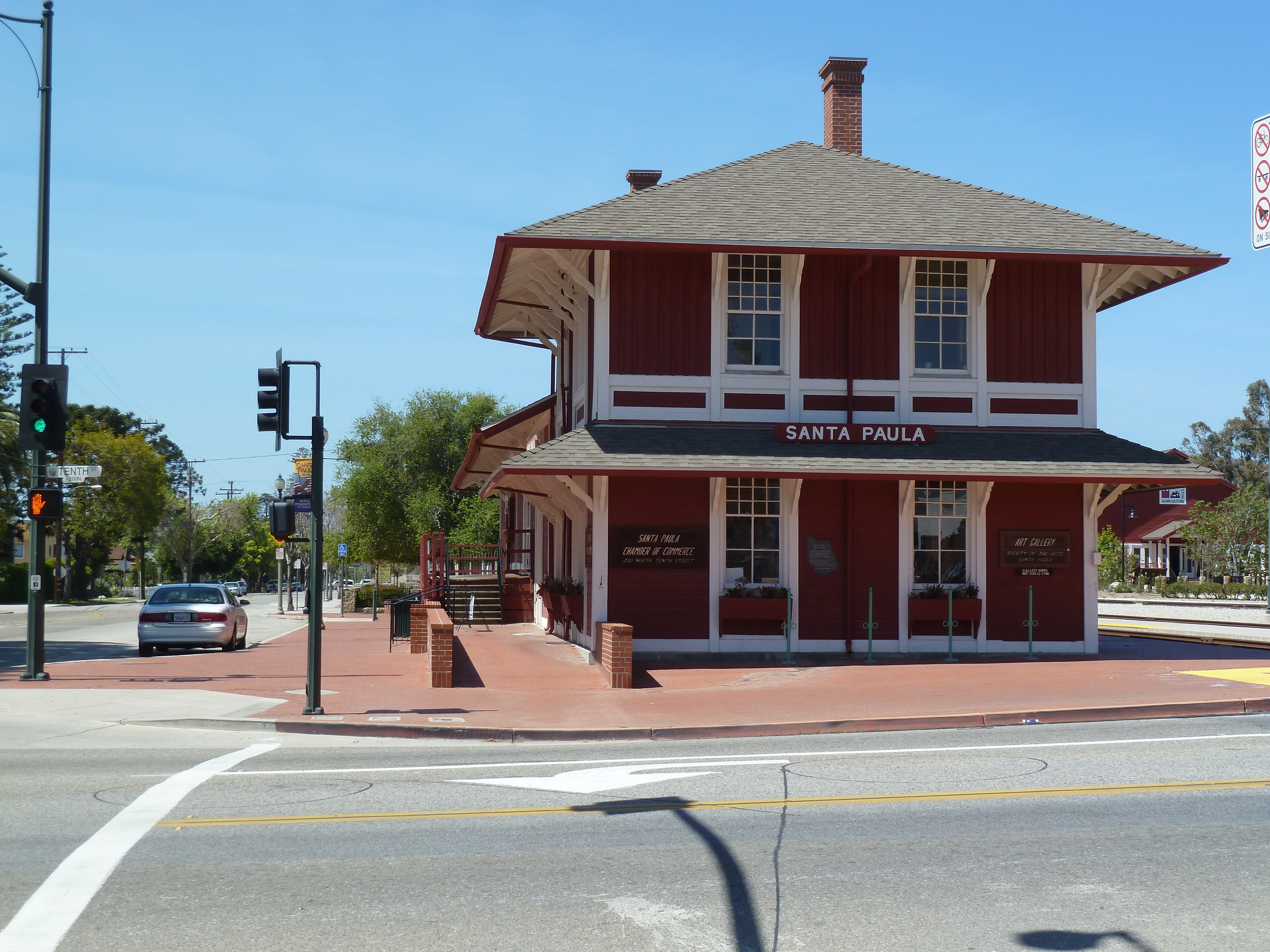

General information
- Location: 963 East Santa Barbara Street; Santa Paula, California
- Coordinates: 34°21′21″N 119°3′40″W
- Line: Santa Paula Branch Line
- Platforms: 2 side platforms
- Tracks: 3

History
- Opened: 1887
- Closed: 1934
- Original company: Southern Pacific

Former services
Preceding station	Fillmore and Western Railway	Following station
Terminus	Santa Paula Branch Line Closed 2021	Fillmore toward Piru
Preceding station	Southern Pacific Railroad	Following station
Saticoy toward Montalvo	Santa Paula Branch	Sespe toward Saugus
Location

The Santa Paula Depot is a former railway station in Santa Paula, California. As a feature of the Sierra Northern Railway and the Fillmore and Western Railway, the station has been seen in various commercials, television shows, and feature films.

== History ==
The station building was built in 1887 as part of the Coast Line and was the first train depot in Ventura County. Passenger services continued until 1934 and freight operations until 1975. It was designated a Ventura County Historic Landmark in 1972. The station currently houses the Santa Paula Chamber of Commerce.

The depot, depicting a rural Australian train station, appeared in the miniseries The Thorn Birds. Portions of the season 3 finale of Glee, titled Goodbye, were filmed at the depot.

Musician Dennis DeYoung (formerly of the band Styx) filmed portions of his hit 1984 song, "Desert Moon" at the Santa Paula depot.
