= Northridge station =

Train station in Northridge, California, US

Northridge
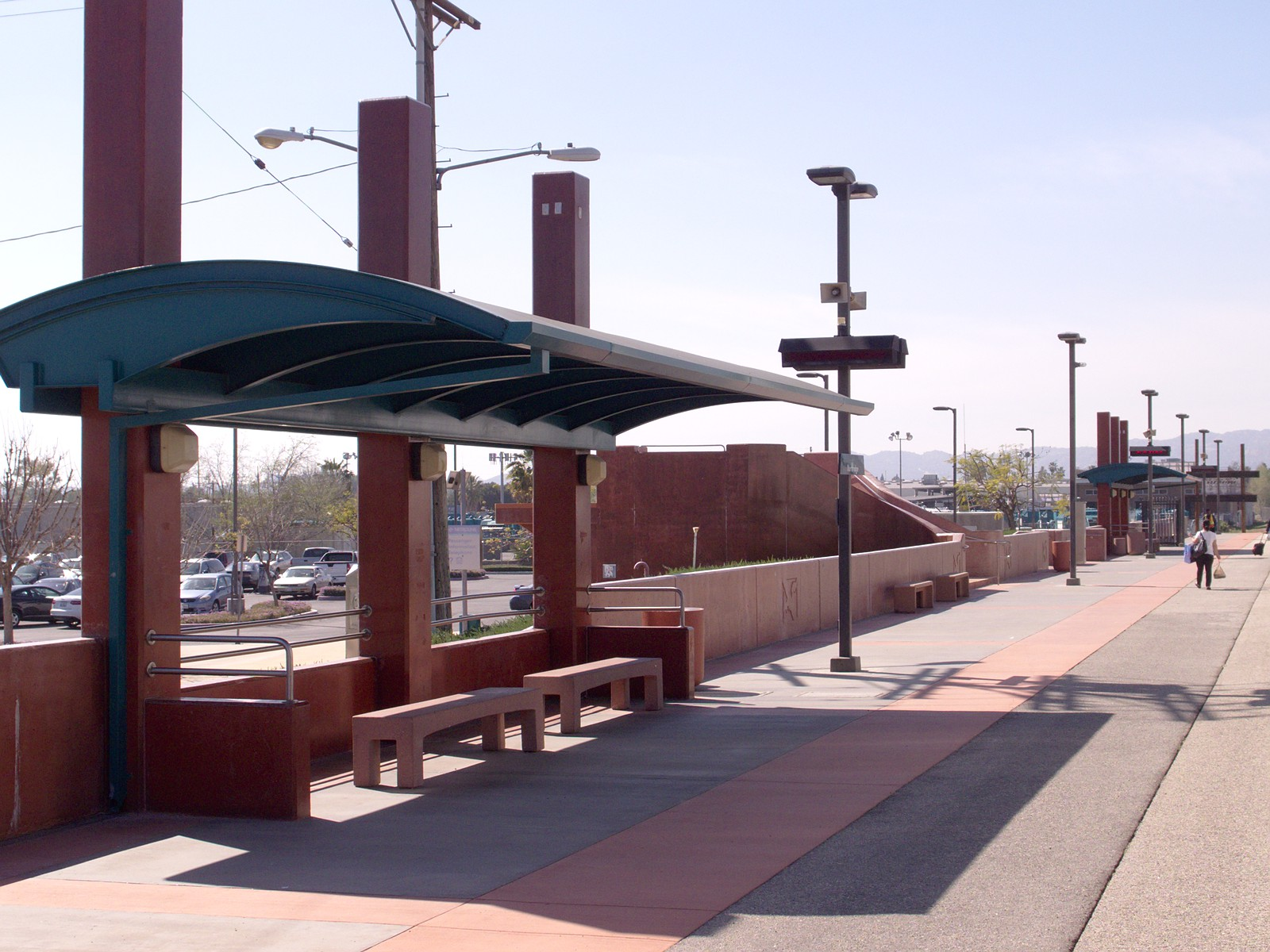
- Northridge station platform, 2013

General information
- Location: 8775 Wilbur Avenue; Northridge, California; United States
- Coordinates: 34°13′46″N 118°32′41″W
- Owner: Los Angeles Department of Transportation
- Line: SCRRA Ventura Subdivision
- Platforms: 1 side platform
- Tracks: 1
- Connections: LADOT DASH: Northridge

Construction
- Parking: 270 spaces, 8 accessible spaces
- Cycle facilities: 14 racks
- Accessible: Yes

Other information
- Station code: Amtrak: NRG

History
- Opened: February 14, 1994
- Rebuilt: July 10, 2000

Passengers
- FY 2025: 24,364 annually (Amtrak)
- FY 2026: 326 weekday boardings (Metrolink)

Services
Preceding station	Amtrak	Following station
Chatsworth toward San Luis Obispo	Pacific Surfliner (limited service)	Van Nuys toward San Diego
Coast Starlight does not stop here
Preceding station	Metrolink	Following station
Chatsworth toward Ventura–East	Ventura County Line	Van Nuys toward L.A. Union Station
Former services
Preceding station	Southern Pacific Railroad	Following station
Chatsworth toward San Francisco	Coast Line	Raymer toward Los Angeles
Location

Northridge station is a Metrolink passenger train station in the community of Northridge neighborhood of Los Angeles, California, in the San Fernando Valley. Metrolink's Ventura County Line trains from Union Station to Ventura–East stop here.

Northridge station is served by 22 Metrolink Ventura County Line trains (11 in each direction) each weekday, running primarily at peak hours in the peak direction of travel. On weekends, 4 Metrolink Ventura County Line trains (2 in each direction) serve the station. Metrolink passengers also have access to 4 Pacific Surfliner trains (2 in each direction) each day through a codesharing arrangement with Amtrak.

The station has 290 parking spaces, 8 handicapped spaces, and 2 parking spaces which have electric vehicle charging stations.

A temporary platform opened at the station on February 14, 1994, as part of the emergency expansion of service on the Ventura County Line in response to the 1994 Northridge earthquake. The permanent station opened on July 10, 2000.

The Los Angeles County Metropolitan Transportation Authority (Metro) has plans to relocate the station to Reseda Boulevard to improve its local connectivity.
