= Saticoy station =

- Saticoy Southern Pacific Railroad Depot
- U.S. National Register of Historic Places
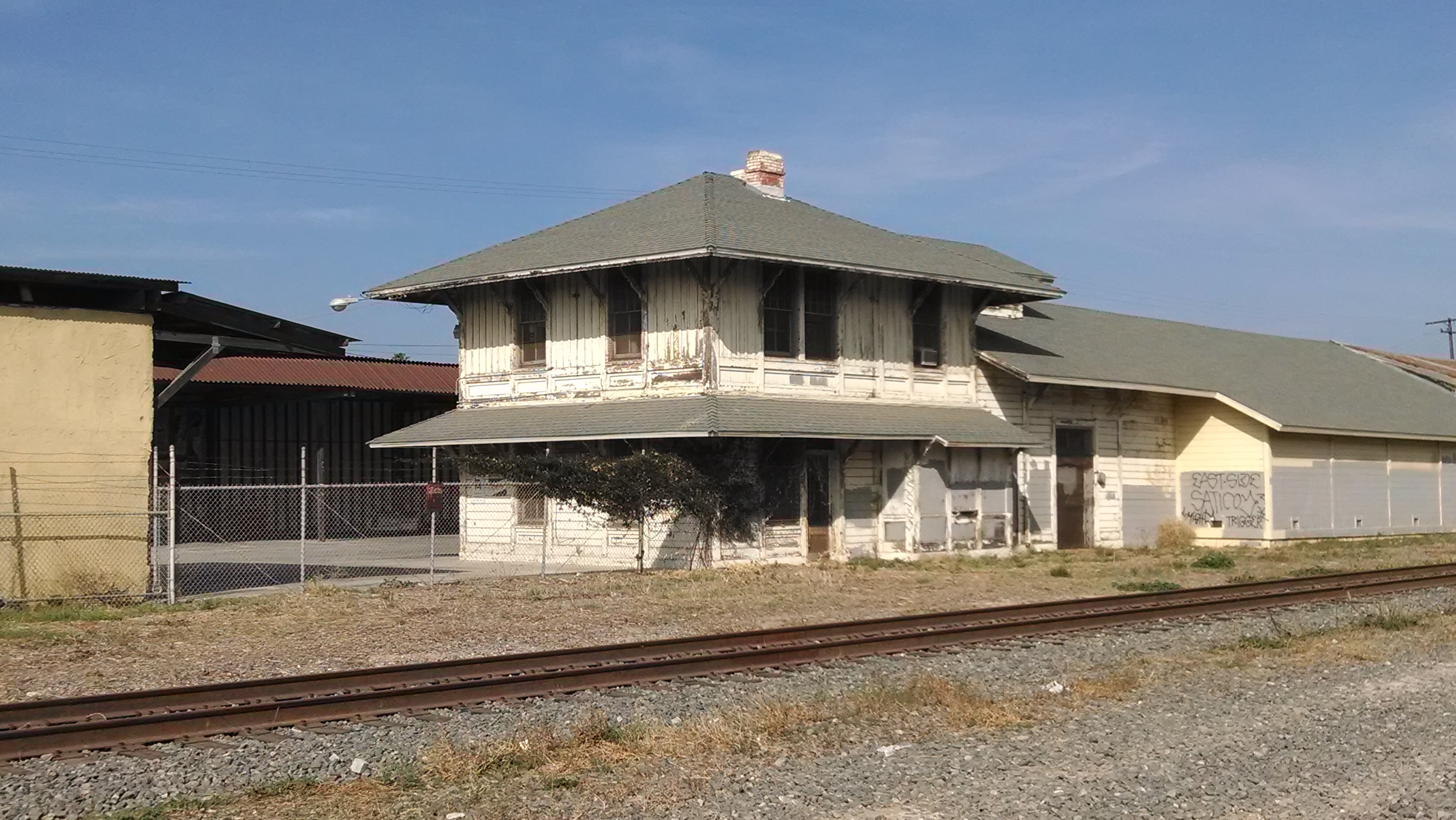

- Location within California
- Location: 11220 Azahar St., Saticoy, California
- Coordinates: 34°17′05″N 119°08′47″W
- Area: 2.13 acres (0.86 ha)
- Built: 1887
- NRHP reference No.: 100002678
- Added to NRHP: July 23, 2018

The Saticoy Southern Pacific Railroad Depot in Saticoy, California was built in 1887.

The depot was designated Ventura County Historic Landmark no. 176 in May 2016. It was listed on the National Register of Historic Places in 2018. Built by the Southern Pacific Railroad along the line that was being constructed from Los Angeles to Ventura in 1887. The original town of Saticoy was laid out near the new depot. Its name comes from the Chumash village of Sa’aqtik’oy.

Preceding station	Southern Pacific Railroad	Following station
Montalvo Terminus	Santa Paula Branch	Santa Paula toward Saugus
