= Van Nuys station =

Railway station in Los Angeles, California

Van Nuys
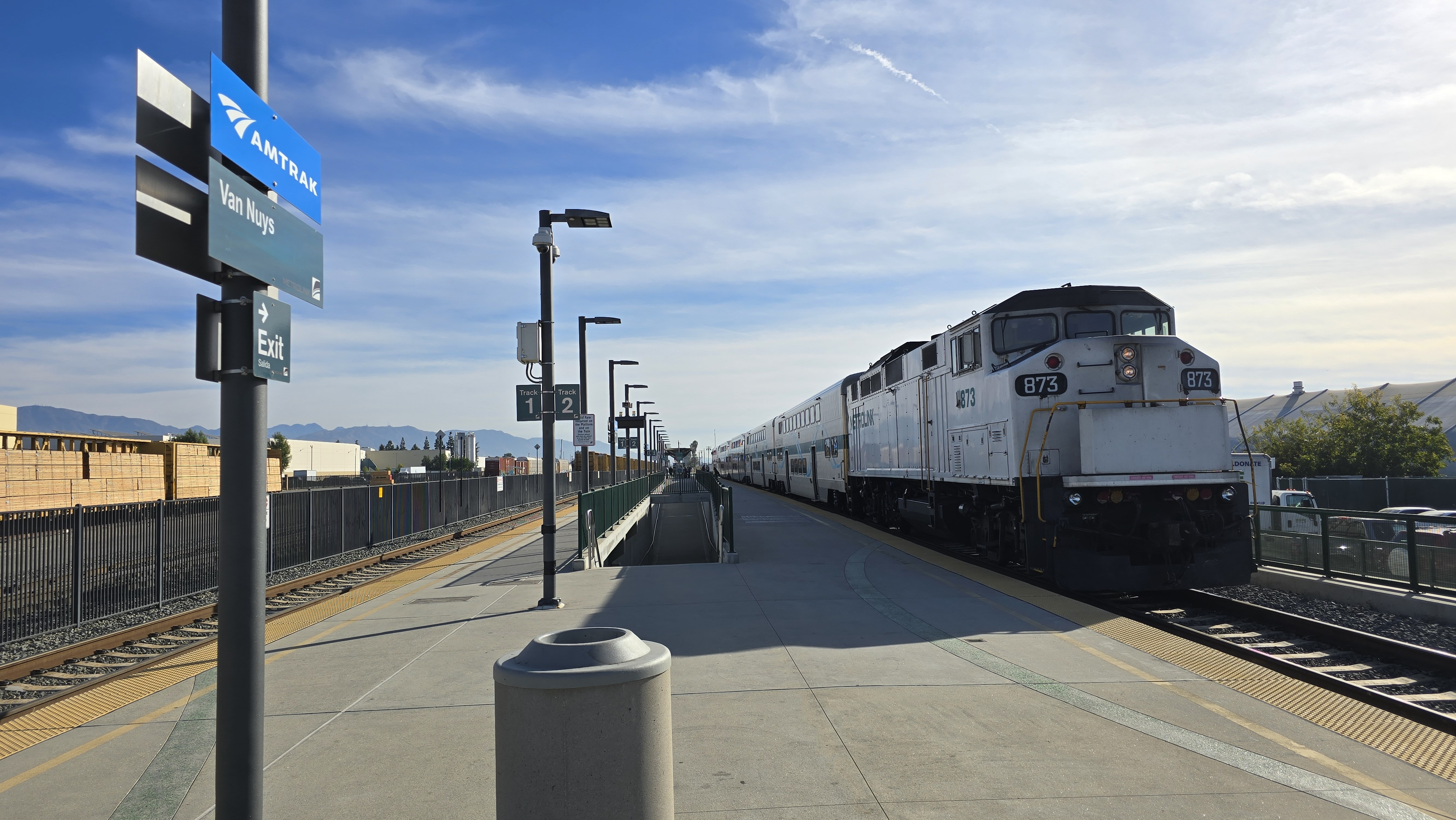
- A Metrolink train at Van Nuys station in 2024

General information
- Location: 7724 Van Nuys Boulevard; Van Nuys, California; United States
- Coordinates: 34°12′41″N 118°26′54″W
- Owner: State of California
- Line: SCRRA Ventura Subdivision
- Platforms: 1 island platform
- Tracks: 3 (1 bypass/yard track)
- Connections: Amtrak Thruway: 1C; LADOT DASH: Panorama City/Van Nuys; Los Angeles Metro Bus: 169, 233, Rapid 761

Construction
- Parking: 350 spaces, 14 accessible spaces
- Cycle facilities: 9 racks
- Accessible: Yes
- Architect: LPA Architects

Other information
- Status: Staffed, station building with waiting room
- Station code: Amtrak: VNC

History
- Opened: October 18, 1982 (CalTrain); June 26, 1988 (Amtrak)
- Closed: March 1, 1983 (CalTrain)
- Rebuilt: 1995, 2019
- Former names: Panorama City (CalTrain)

Passengers
- FY 2025: 67,885 annually (Amtrak)
- FY 2026: 129 weekday boardings (Metrolink)

Services
| Preceding station | Amtrak | Following station |
|---|---|---|
| Simi Valley toward Seattle | Coast Starlight | Hollywood Burbank Airport toward Los Angeles |
| Chatsworth toward San Luis Obispo | Pacific Surfliner | Hollywood Burbank Airport toward San Diego |
| Northridge (limited service) toward San Luis Obispo | Pacific Surfliner | Hollywood Burbank Airport toward San Diego |
| Preceding station | Metrolink | Following station |
| Northridge toward Ventura–East | Ventura County Line | Burbank Airport–South toward L.A. Union Station |
Former services
| Preceding station | CalTrain | Following station |
|---|---|---|
| Chatsworth toward Oxnard | Los Angeles–Oxnard | Burbank Airport toward Los Angeles |
| Preceding station | Pacific Electric | Following station |
| Whitsert toward San Fernando | San Fernando | Amherst toward Subway Terminal |
| Whitsert toward Canoga Park | Owensmouth | Amherst toward Subway Terminal |
| Preceding station | Southern Pacific Railroad | Following station |
| Raymer toward San Francisco | Coast Line | Burbank toward Los Angeles |
Future services
| Preceding station | Metro Rail | Following station |
|---|---|---|
| Roscoe toward Van Nuys/San Fernando | East San Fernando Valley Light Rail Transit Project | Sherman Way toward Van Nuys |
Location

Van Nuys station is an Amtrak and Metrolink train station in the Van Nuys neighborhood of Los Angeles, California, close to the neighborhood of Panorama City. Amtrak's Pacific Surfliner from San Luis Obispo to San Diego, Amtrak's Coast Starlight from Los Angeles to Seattle, Washington, and Metrolink's Ventura County Line from Los Angeles Union Station to East Ventura stop here.

Van Nuys station is served by 10 Amtrak Pacific Surfliner trains (5 in each direction) every day and 2 Coast Starlight trains (1 in each direction), with departures evenly spaced throughout the day. 22 Metrolink Ventura County Line trains (10 in each direction) serve the station each weekday, running during peak hours in the peak direction of travel. On weekends, 4 Metrolink Ventura County Line trains (2 in each direction) serve the station. Metrolink passengers also have access to all Pacific Surfliner trains through a codesharing arrangement with Amtrak.

The station when opened the first time in 1982 was called Panorama City and was served by the short-lived CalTrain service in 1982–83. In 1988, service was restored with the Amtrak San Diegan with the station renamed as Van Nuys, and Metrolink service began in 1992.

== History ==
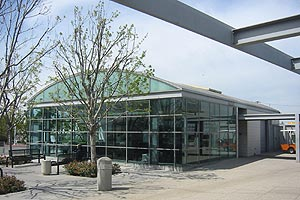
The 1995-built station house

The diagonal railway across the San Fernando Valley was built in 1904 as a cutoff for the Southern Pacific Coast Line. At the time the main Van Nuys station was located further south on the Burbank branch, at the modern Van Nuys G Line station.

Panorama City station opened with the inauguration of CalTrain on October 18, 1982. The short-lived service ended on March 1, 1983. Amtrak service to Van Nuys (the former CalTrain station) began on June 26, 1988, when one San Diegan round trip was extended to Santa Barbara. Metrolink began Ventura County Line service with a stop at Van Nuys on October 26, 1992. A modern glass-and-concrete Van Nuys station building, funded by Caltrans, opened on December 18, 1995.

The station originally had a single side platform serving the southern track of the two-track Ventura Subdivision. A third track to the north is part of the Union Pacific Railroad Gemco Yard. In January 2018, Metrolink began construction of an island platform — which serves both main tracks — and a pedestrian underpass. Original plans called for a second side platform instead, but the island platform design had fewer impacts. The project was originally to be completed in late 2019, but was not officially finished until January 2020.

=== Future ===
Van Nuys is expected to be expanded in the coming years to provide more connectivity through the Valley and the rest of Los Angeles County.

The Los Angeles Metro East San Fernando Valley Light Rail Transit Project line runs adjacent to the station and the agency is planning a stop near Keswick Street to provide an interchange between systems. A new island platform in the median of Van Nuys Boulevard is expected to open for service in 2031. That line's maintenance and storage facility is additionally planned to be located nearby.

This is the northernmost station of the further planned Sepulveda Transit Corridor.
