= Burbank Airport–South station =

Railway station in Burbank, California

Hollywood Burbank Airport, CA
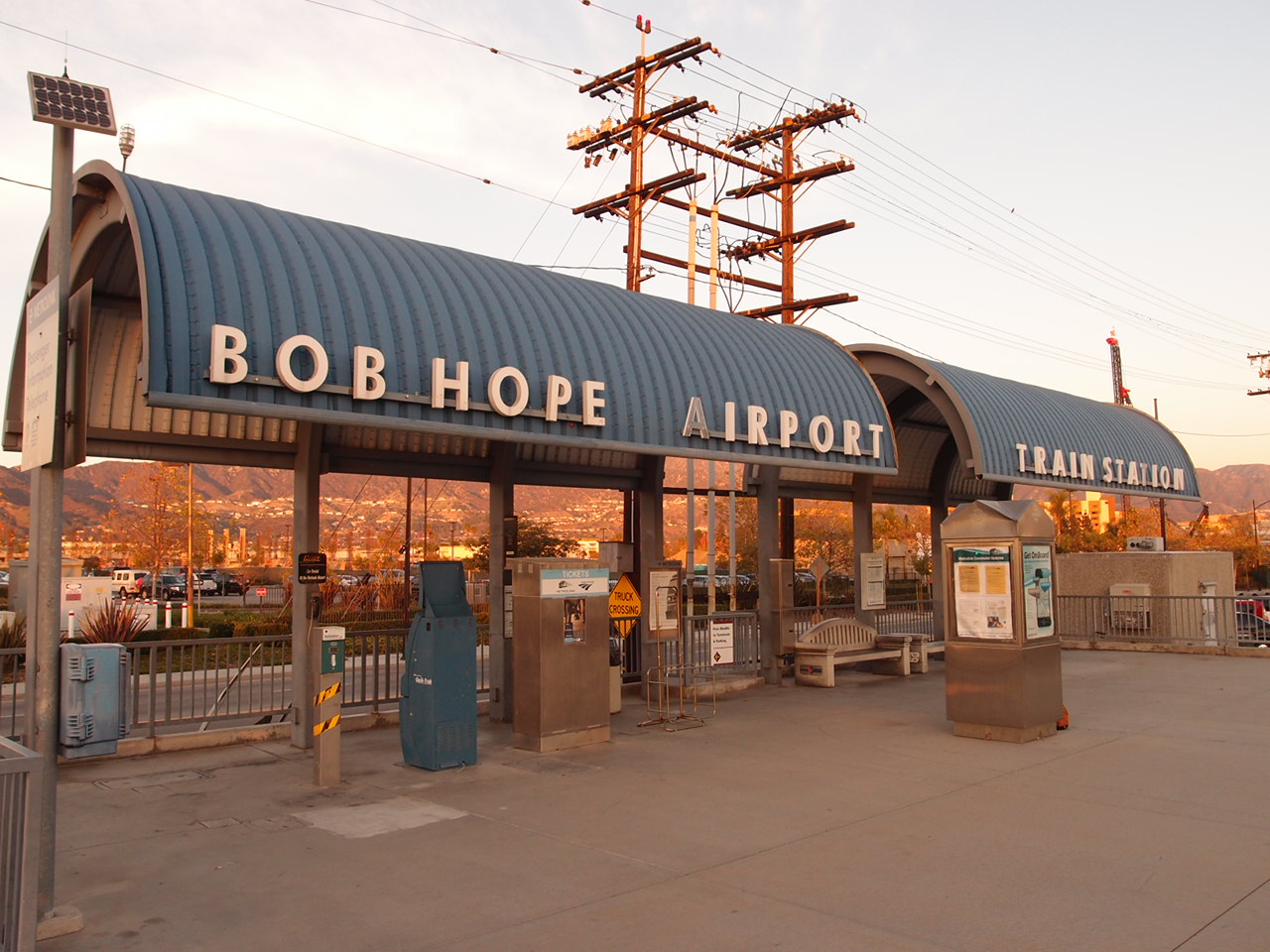
- Station in 2012 (as Bob Hope Airport station)

General information
- Other names: Burbank Airport–South
- Location: 3750 Empire Avenue; Burbank, California; United States
- Coordinates: 34°11′34″N 118°21′08″W
- Owner: California Department of Transportation
- Line: SCRRA Ventura Subdivision
- Platforms: 2 side platforms
- Tracks: 2
- Train operators: Amtrak; Metrolink
- Connections: Amtrak Thruway: 1C; Burbank Bus: Orange; Los Angeles Metro Bus: 165, 169, 222, 294, Metro Micro North Hollywood/Burbank

Construction
- Structure type: Embankment
- Parking: 40 spaces, paid parking also available in airport lots
- Cycle facilities: Yes
- Accessible: Yes

Other information
- Status: Unstaffed, platform with shelters
- Station code: Amtrak: BUR

History
- Opened: February 1983 (CalTrain); June 1, 1990 (Amtrak)
- Closed: March 1, 1983 (CalTrain)

Passengers
- FY 2025: 57,923 annually (Amtrak)
- FY 2026: 109 weekday boardings (Metrolink)

Services
Preceding station	Amtrak	Following station
Van Nuys One-way operation	Coast Starlight	Los Angeles Terminus
Van Nuys toward San Luis Obispo	Pacific Surfliner	Glendale toward San Diego
Van Nuys toward San Luis Obispo	Pacific Surfliner	Downtown Burbank (limited service) toward San Diego
Preceding station	Metrolink	Following station
Van Nuys toward Ventura–East	Ventura County Line	Downtown Burbank toward L.A. Union Station
Former services
Preceding station	CalTrain	Following station
Panorama City toward Oxnard	Los Angeles–Oxnard	Glendale toward Los Angeles
Location
- Location within California Location within the United States

Burbank Airport–South station, referred to as Hollywood Burbank Airport station by Amtrak and formerly known as Bob Hope Airport station, is an unstaffed Amtrak and Metrolink train station on the southeast corner of Hollywood Burbank Airport in the city of Burbank, California. Amtrak's Pacific Surfliner from San Luis Obispo to San Diego, Amtrak's Coast Starlight from Los Angeles to Seattle, Washington, and Metrolink's Ventura County Line from Los Angeles Union Station to East Ventura stop here.

Burbank Airport–South station is served by 10 Amtrak Pacific Surfliner trains (5 in each direction) every day, with departures evenly spaced throughout the day. 22 Metrolink Ventura County Line trains (11 in each direction) serve the station each weekday, running during peak hours in the peak direction of travel. On weekends, 4 Metrolink Ventura County Line trains (2 in each direction) serve the station. Metrolink passengers also have access to all Pacific Surfliner trains through a codesharing arrangement with Amtrak.

Twice daily Amtrak Thruway 1C bus service connects the station with Newhall and Bakersfield to the north, Van Nuys to the west, and Westwood/UCLA and Santa Monica to the south.

The station is located across Empire Avenue from the airport's Regional Intermodal Transportation Center (RITC). Most city bus lines stop at the bottom level of the RITC. Passengers traveling to the airport can take an elevator or escalator to a pedestrian bridge that connects the RITC to the terminal with moving walkways. The airport also offers shuttle service for those unable or unwilling to use the pedestrian bridge and moving walkways.

Of the 76 California stations served by Amtrak, Burbank was the 28th-busiest in FY2017, with 73,814 total passengers.

== History ==
The station was opened in February 1983 as an infill station on the short-lived CalTrain line. It would see less than one month of use by this service. Amtrak began limited service there on June 1, 1990. Metrolink trains began using the station on April 24, 1995, after the completion of a project to lengthen the platform.

The station is part of a new intermodal transportation center which the Burbank City Council approved in late August 2010. The facility cost around $93 million. Groundbreaking occurred during the summer of 2012 and construction was completed summer 2014. It serves rail, air and bus travelers, as well as incorporating rental car facilities.
