= Gold Coast Transit =

Bus operator in California, US

Coordinates: 34.2271°N 119.1487°W

Gold Coast Transit District

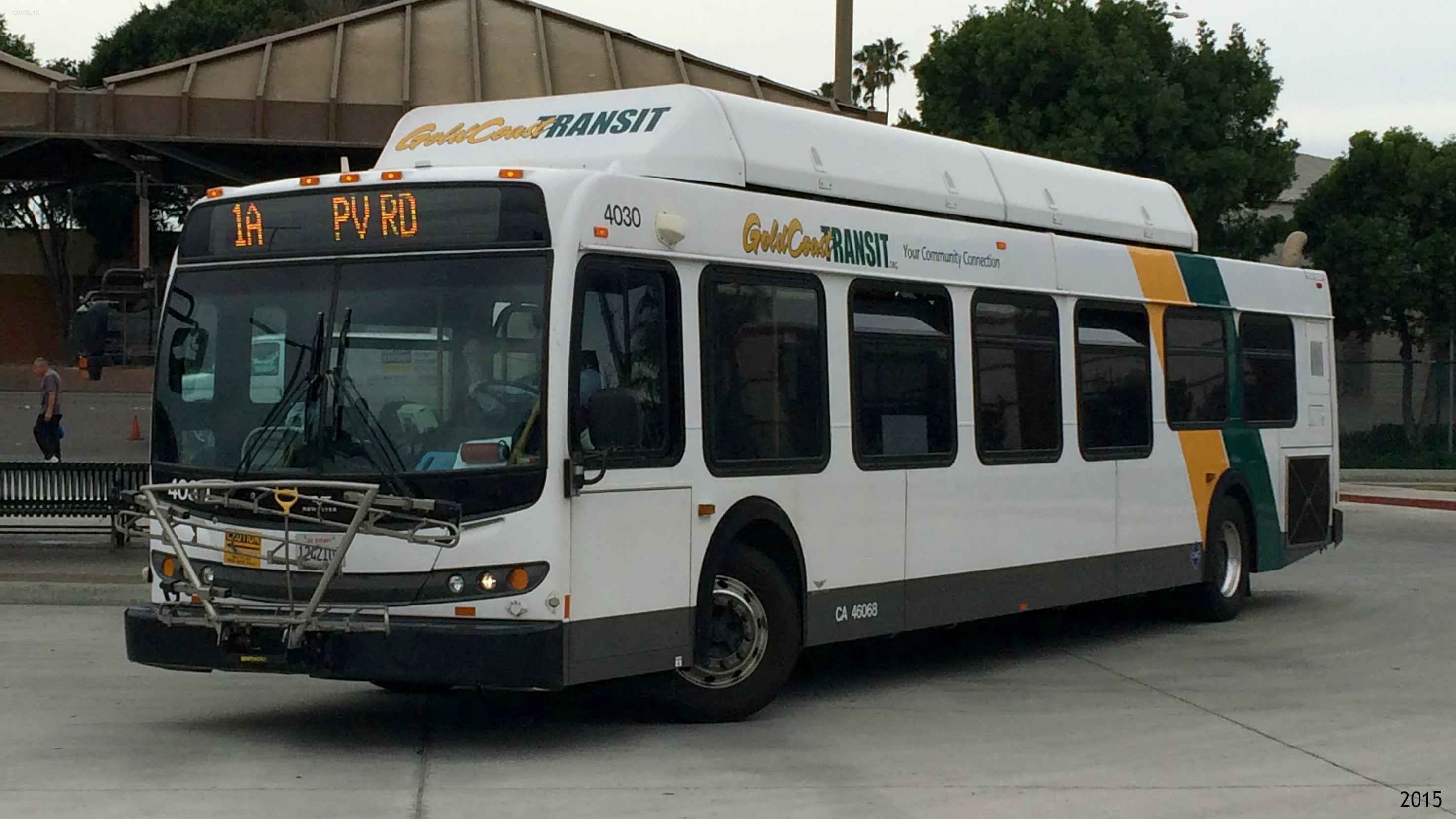
- Gold Coast Transit bus at Oxnard Transit Center in 2015
- Founded: 1973
- Headquarters: 301 East Third Street; Oxnard, California
- Service area: Ventura County, California
- Service type: bus service, paratransit
- Routes: 23
- Fleet: 64 buses
- Daily ridership: 11,700 (weekdays, Q2 2026)
- Annual ridership: 3,587,900 (2025)
- Website: www.gctd.org

Gold Coast Transit District, formerly known as South Coast Area Transit (SCAT), is a local bus operator in western Ventura County, California, serving Ventura, Oxnard, Port Hueneme, Ojai, and the adjoining areas of unincorporated Ventura County. In 2025, the system had a ridership of 3,587,900, or about 11,700 per weekday as of the second quarter of 2026.

== History ==
Gold Coast Transit District was founded in 1973 as South Coast Area Transit with the merger of the Ventura City Transit Lines and the Oxnard Municipal Bus Lines. Until 1994, SCAT also served Santa Paula. Service to Santa Paula has since been replaced with VCTC Intercity fixed-route and dial-a-ride services. The system adopted the name Gold Coast Transit effective July 1, 2007. This accompanied a change in bus livery and the acquisition of 26 new buses.

In October 2013, California Assembly Bill 664 was chartered as the enabling legislation to transition Gold Coast Transit from a joint powers authority to a special purpose transit district. On July 1, 2014, the agency officially became Gold Coast Transit District. The district's founding member jurisdictions include the cities of Ojai, Oxnard, Port Hueneme, and Ventura and the County of Ventura. The bill allows other cities in Ventura County to subsequently join the district.

In 2014, GCTD leadership was recognized with the District being honored as the “Transit Agency of the Year” at the Small Operators award ceremony hosted by the California Transit Association (CTA) as part of its 49th Annual Conference and Expo in Monterey, California.

On May 10, 2017 Gold Coast Transit District broke ground on a new operations and maintenance facility in Oxnard. The facility opened in July 2019.

== Service area ==
Gold Coast Transit District provides bus service to these cities and communities:

- Oxnard
- Ventura
- Port Hueneme
- Ojai
- El Rio
- Saticoy
- Oak View
- Mira Monte

== Routes ==
=== Local routes ===
As of May 2024, Gold Coast Transit District operates 18 local lines and 4 school trippers lines as well as paratransit service.

Route	Terminals		Via	Notes
1A	Oxnard Oxnard Transit Center		C St, Saviers Rd	Clockwise loop; Serves Centerpoint Mall
1B	Oxnard Oxnard Transit Center		C St, Saviers Rd	Counter-clockwise loop; Serves Centerpoint Mall
2	Oxnard Oxnard Transit Center	Colonia San Gorgonio Av & Gibraltar St	Colonia Rd, 1st St	Interlined with Route 3
3	Oxnard Oxnard Transit Center	Oxnard El Dorado Av & Channel Island Bl	J St, Channel Island Bl	Serves Centerpoint Mall; Interlined with Route 8
4A	Oxnard Oxnard Transit Center		Gonzales Rd, Rose Av, 3rd St	Clockwise loop
4B	Oxnard Oxnard Transit Center		Gonzales Rd, Rose Av, 3rd St	Counter-clockwise loop
5	Oxnard Oxnard Transit Center	Oxnard Hemlock St & Patterson Rd	5th St, Wooley Rd	
6	Oxnard Oxnard Transit Center	Ventura Ventura Av and Willett St	C St, Victoria Av, Telegraph Rd, Ventura Av	Serves Ventura College and Pacific View Mall; 5 minute walk to Ventura–East Metrolink Station from Bristol Rd & Hill Rd stop
7	Oxnard Centerpoint Mall	Oxnard Butler Rd and Pleasant Valley Rd	Saviers Rd, Pleasant Valley Rd	Serves Oxnard College
8	Oxnard Oxnard Transit Center	Oxnard Centerpoint Mall	5th St, Rose Av, Bard Rd, Saviers Rd	Serves Oxnard College
10	Ventura Ventura Transit Center	Ventura Darling Rd & Jonquill Av	Telegraph Rd	Serves Ventura College; Interlined with Route 16
11	Ventura Ventura Transit Center	Ventura Wells Rd and Carlos St	Telephone Rd	
15	Oxnard Esplanade Shopping Center	Oxnard Auto Center Dr & Paseo Mercado	Vineyard Av, Alvarado St, Gonzales Rd	Serves St John's Regional Medical Center
16	Ventura Ventura Transit Center	Ojai Ojai Av & Fox St	Thompson Blvd, Ventura Av, Ojai Av	Interlined with Route 10
17	Oxnard Esplanade Shopping Center	Oxnard Oxnard College	Ventura Bl, Rose Av	
19	Oxnard Oxnard Transit Center		5th St, Victoria Av, Gonzales Rd, Rice Av, 3rd St	Clockwise loop
21	Oxnard Centerpoint Mall	Ventura Ventura Transit Center	Channel Islands Bl, Victoria Av, Telegraph Rd	Serves Ventura College
23	Oxnard Oxnard College	Oxnard Esplanade Shopping Center	Pleasant Valley Rd, Ventura Rd	

=== School Trippers routes ===
Gold Coast Transit District operates five "school trippers" that supplement school bus service to local high schools. While intended to serve students with service only on school days, these routes are open to the general public.

Route	Terminals		Via	Notes
18A	Oxnard Channel Islands Bl & Ventura Rd	Oxnard Oxnard High School	C St, Doris St	Serves Centerpoint Mall
18C	Oxnard Oxnard High School		H St	To 5th St & Ventura Rd
18E	Oxnard Pacifica High School		Rose Av	To Oxnard Transit Center
18F	Ventura Ventura Av & Norway Dr	Ventura Ventura High School	Ventura Av, Santa Clara St	Morning trip continues on to Ventura Transit Center
18G	Oxnard Nyeland Av & Ventura Bl	Oxnard Rio Mesa High School	Rose Av	
