= Montalvo, Ventura, California =

Montalvo is a neighborhood in Ventura, California, United States. Founded about 1887 as an unincorporated community in Ventura County, it was annexed into the city in 2012. Montalvo is located in the southern portion of the city on the northern bank of the Santa Clara River at the edge of the Oxnard Plain. It is bounded by Victoria Avenue to the west, Ralston Street to the north, Johnson Drive to the east, and the Ventura Freeway to the south.

== History ==
J. G. Hill, credited with being the founder of Montalvo, laid out plans for the town site in 1886. Some accounts indicate that the community was named after Garci Rodríguez de Montalvo, the Spanish author who first described the Island of California in the 1510 novel Las Sergas de Esplandián. In 1887, the Southern Pacific Railroad built the railroad line from Los Angeles through the Santa Clara River Valley northerly through the area.

In its early days, Montalvo was served by the Washington Street railroad depot. For awhile, the depot was the terminus of the Southern Pacific Railroad in Ventura County. Goods destined for Ventura and Port Hueneme were unloaded at Montalvo and taken by cart to those locations. The community also became a center for growing and processing apricots. A school was built on Grand Avenue in 1889. In the 19th century, the community had a newspaper called the Montalvo Courier or the Evening Monitor. It was a thriving community in the late 19th century. In the late 1880s, the University of Southern California planned to establish a satellite campus, to be known as the "Collegiate Institute", on a grassy knoll in Montalvo. According to one account: "There was a splendid hotel beside the large depot. The town boasted a daily newspaper, a Chinese laundry, a general store and post office that was the center of life along the river." Montalvo promoters touted the community as "the Pasadena of Ventura County."

In the early 1900s, after railroad service was extended to Oxnard, most of the homes in Montalvo were physically relocated across the Santa Clara River to Oxnard. Oxnard became a boom town, and home mover John Brakey developed a thriving business loading homes on rollers and moving them across the dry river bed from Montalvo to Oxnard. During this time, Montalvo also lost its newspaper and printing press. By the 1920s, most of Montalvo's population had relocated elsewhere.

After World War II, several residential neighborhoods were built in Montalvo. In 1952, the community formed the Montalvo Sanitary District (later renamed the Montalvo Municipal Improvement District) and built a sewage treatment plant to facilitate further development. Development was halted in 1958 when the Ventura County Health Department found the sewage treatment plant to be inadequate. After improvement to the sewage facilities, development resumed.

In 1961, Ventura County master plan consultants proposed developing Montalvo as "the core of an urban region" covering Ventura, Oxnard, Port Hueneme, and Saticoy, which was predicted to reach a population of 700,000 by 1980 and 2,000,000 by the year 2020. The consultants proposed making Montalvo the hub of Ventura County government, culture, and transportation, including development of a civic center and a state college.

In 1967, the Ventura Freeway was constructed through Montalvo, resulting in significant financial losses to local merchants.

=== Annexation ===
In the 1970s and 1980s, the city of Ventura expanded eastward and residents debated proposals to accept annexation of Montalvo into the city of Ventura.

Annexation of areas around Montalvo stimulated new construction including 35 apartment buildings on three Montalvo streets south of the Bristol Shopping Center. By 1990, unincorporated Montalvo had a population of 4,630 and a median household income of $46,602. In the 1990s, the area began to experience increased blight and crime, including fights, drug dealing and tagging, as two gangs claimed the apartment area as their territory. In 1994, the Ventura Police Department opened a storefront substation in the Montalvo area to attempt to fight the increased crime.

An initial effort at annexation was defeated in 1992. The Ventura–East station, a Metrolink passenger train station opened for regular service in November 2002. Montalvo was annexed into the city of Ventura in September 2012. The city added a community sign and sidewalks in 2023.

== Landmarks ==
Notable landmarks in Montalvo included Sam Korb's Trading Post, Loop's Restaurant, Little Heidelberg Restaurant, and The White Spot.

Montalvo also was home to a natural dirt mound in the northern part of the community that was rumored to be the work of native Americans. It was described in the 1890s as having an altitude of 150 feet (46 m) with smoothly sloping sides and approximately one-quarter mile in length. Later press reports indicate that large portions of the mound were removed to be used as fill dirt.

== See also ==
- West Montalvo Oil Field
