= Fillmore and Western Railway =

Heritage railroad in Ventura County, California, USA

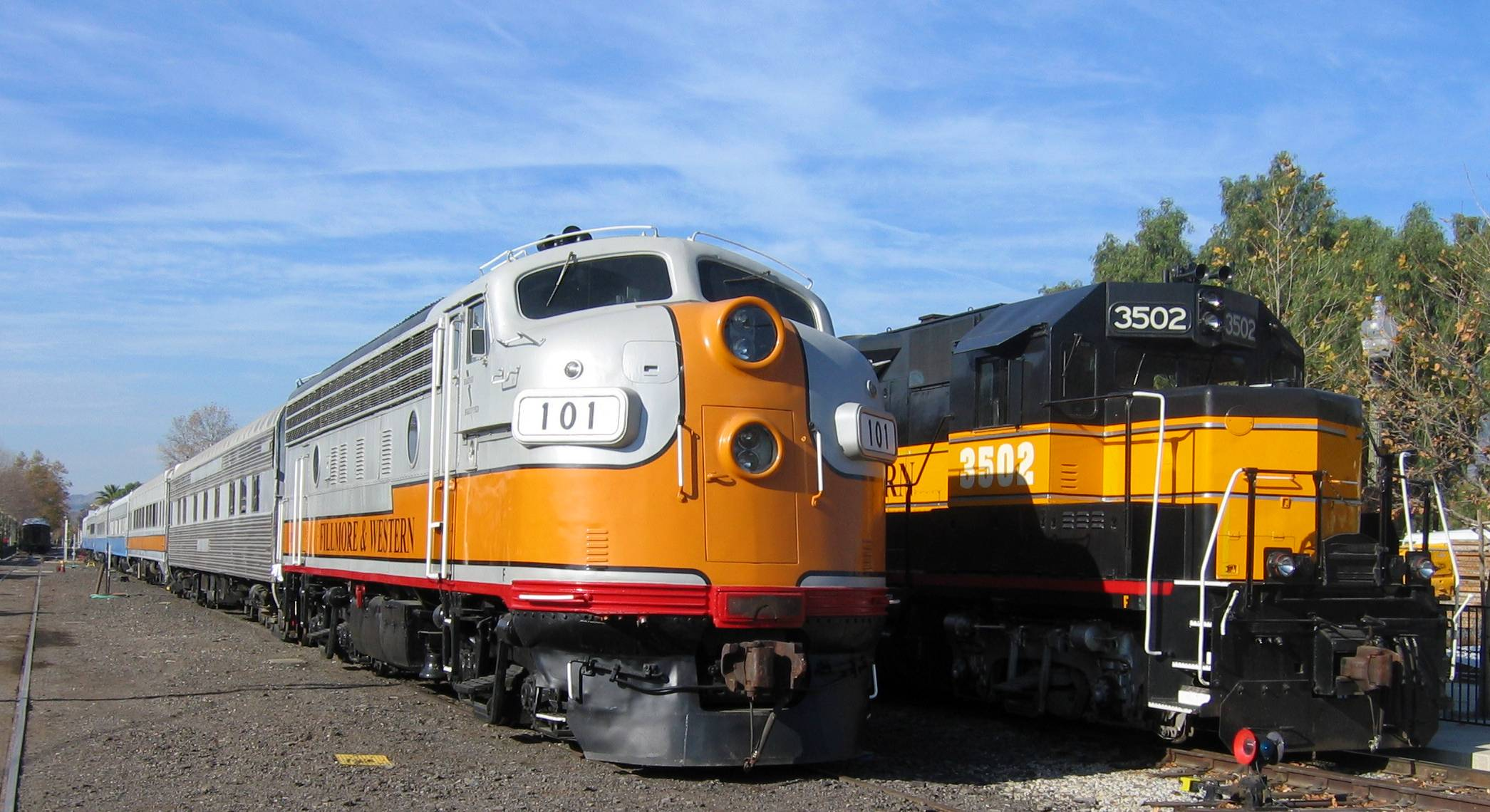
- Fillmore and Western Railway EMD F7 No. 101 and GP35 No. 3502.
- Locale: Ventura County, California, USA
- Coordinates: 34°23′57″N 118°54′39″W

Commercial operations
- Built by: Southern Pacific Railroad
- Original gauge: 4 ft 8 1/2 in (1,435 mm) standard gauge

Preserved operations
- Owned by: Track owned by the Ventura County Transportation Commission Rolling stock owned by Fillmore and Western Railway
- Operated by: Fillmore and Western Railway
- Reporting mark: FWRY
- Preserved gauge: 4 ft 8 1/2 in (1,435 mm) standard gauge

Commercial history
- Opened: 1887
- 1995: Sold to VCTC

Preservation history
- 1991: Short Line Enterprises begins using line
- 2021: Final scheduled excursion
- Headquarters: Fillmore

Website
- fwry.com

The Fillmore and Western Railway (reporting mark FWRY) was a heritage railway which operated on track owned by the Ventura County Transportation Commission. Visitors to Fillmore would see filming activity as well as sets and support equipment at the company's rail yard and along the tracks between Santa Paula and Piru. They stopped operating on the line in 2021.

== History ==
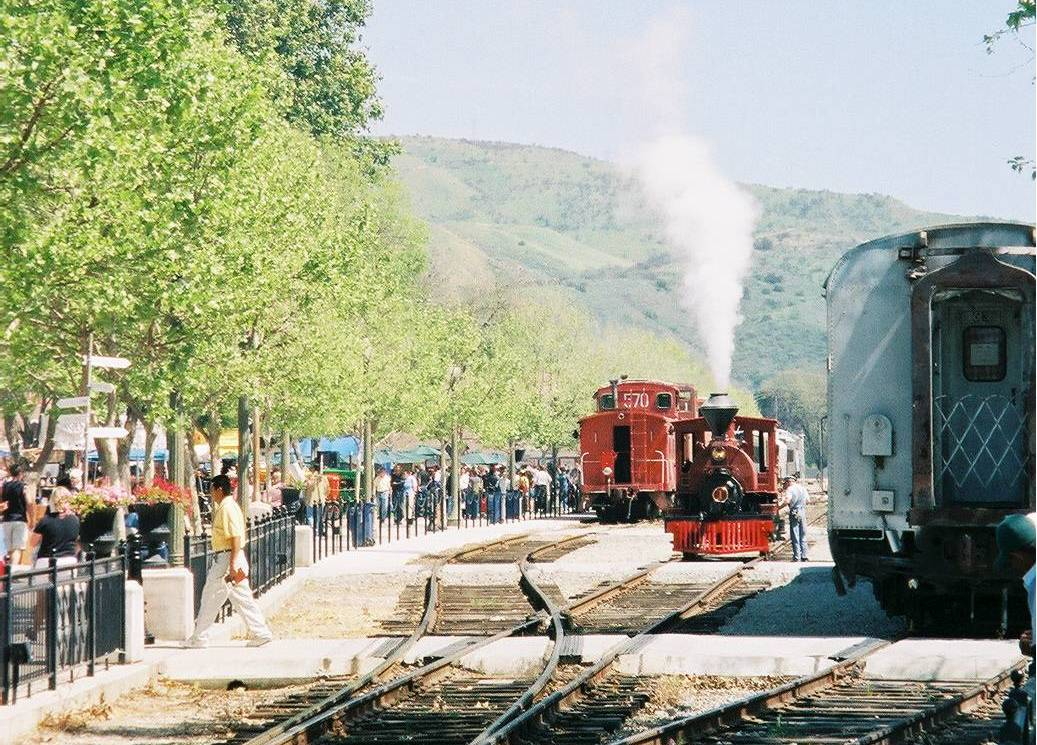
Fillmore & Western Railway Railroad Days Festival, March 2004.

The track is a standard gauge railroad constructed in 1887 by Southern Pacific Railroad through the Santa Clara River Valley in Ventura County, California. This line was originally part of the Southern Pacific's main line between San Francisco and Los Angeles before the shorter Montalvo Cutoff was built through the Santa Susana Mountains in 1904. State Route 126 follows roughly the same route from Ventura to Santa Clarita. The track was used extensively by Southern Pacific as late as the 1950s to haul citrus from packing houses at the communities along the Santa Clara River. In 1995, the branch line that connects at its west end to the Union Pacific at Montalvo in Ventura was purchased from Southern Pacific by the Ventura County Transportation Commission. The eastern end of the line terminates in Piru as storm damage in 1979 severed the eastern end of the line to Saugus in Los Angeles County.

Short Line Enterprises was a company that provided railcars for use in movie productions. They came to Fillmore in 1991 to use the rail line and eventually added tourist and dinner trains.

The railroad operated a year-round tourist train and offers numerous special events, including the Railroad Days Festival, the Pumpkinliner, Christmas Tree Trains, the North Pole Express, and the Day Out with Thomas. The normal schedule involved weekend excursions, dinner trains, murder mystery trains, barbecue trains, and shopping excursions to nearby Santa Paula.

The F&W was used in more than 400 movies, TV and commercial shots. Movies shot on the railroad include Throw Momma from the Train, Three Amigos, Seabiscuit, Get Smart, Rails & Ties, I’ll Remember April, and Race to Witch Mountain. Television series CSI, NCIS: Los Angeles and Criminal Minds have used the railroad for location shooting.

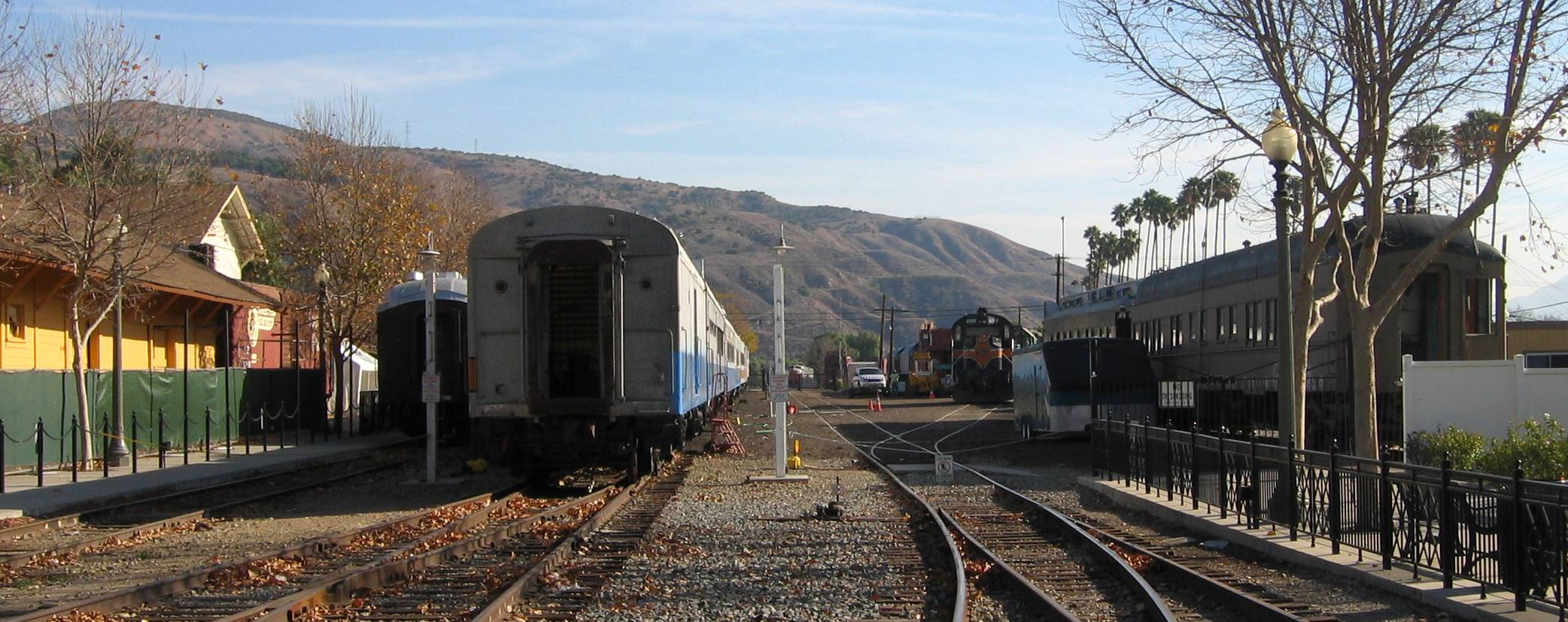
Fillmore and Western Railway tracks. The ex-Canadian turntable is being installed just on the other side of the buildings on the left of the photograph.

The rail yard is located adjacent to the restored city hall in downtown Fillmore and is part of the revitalized section of the city rebuilt after the extensive damage caused by the 1994 Northridge earthquake that brought down the facades of many nearby businesses. A vintage 1906 80-ton turntable bridge originally installed in Capreol, Ontario, was purchased from the Canadian National Railway by the Santa Clara River Valley Railroad Historical Society (SCRVRHS) and was installed in a newly constructed pit on February 7, 2007. The turntable allows not only turning of locomotives and cars but also access to planned facilities on tracks in the narrow yard area. This area is planned to be the center of a proposed railway heritage park complex that will also feature a roundhouse and a Railroad Interpretive Center Museum.

Ventura County Transportation Commission reached a settlement with the Fillmore and Western for trains to operate until 2021. Fillmore and Western's lease agreement expired after June 30, 2021. The final scheduled excursion trip was on June 26.

The Sierra Northern Railway became the contract operator of the line in December after approval by the Ventura County Transportation Commission.

== Rolling stock ==
The majority of F&W rolling stock was acquired from four major studios: 20th Century Fox, Paramount, Warner Bros, and MGM. The rolling stock and right-of-way were frequently used for the filming of television series, motion pictures and commercials and as a locale for private and commercial still photography.

The roster of the F&W includes two GP35s, two F7s from General Motors Electro-Motive Division and an S6 and RS32 from Alco. The railroad also owns numerous coaches, freight cars, cabooses and excursion cars. The F&W roster also includes an Ex-Duluth and Northeastern Baldwin #14 2-8-0 Consolidation steam locomotive. In 2014, a 0-4-0T Porter tank engine, the Sespe, was sold to the city of Jacksonville, Oregon.

The railroad also owned the two full-size steam locomotive props that were built for The Lone Ranger (2013). They are not working steam locomotives (and never were), being propelled instead by diesel engines located in their tenders. The larger of the two (named "Constitution" in the film) has been used in several other productions, including Westworld and The Good Place.

The majority of the locomotives, rolling stock and other assets were acquired by Sierra Northern after the lease of the rail line ended. Three pieces of equipment, including the S6, a passenger car, and the body of a Pacific Fruit Express reefer, were sold to Virginia and Truckee Railroad in Virginia City, Nevada in February 2022. GP35 #3501 was sold to SMV and the "Jupiter" prop and one of the prop coaches from The Lone Ranger, as well as the GP35 prop from Inception and the prop cab from Unstoppable were sold to Volo Auto Museum.

== See also ==
- Heritage railway
- List of heritage railroads in the United States
- List of heritage railways
