= Saugus station =

Former train station in Santa Clarita, California

Saugus
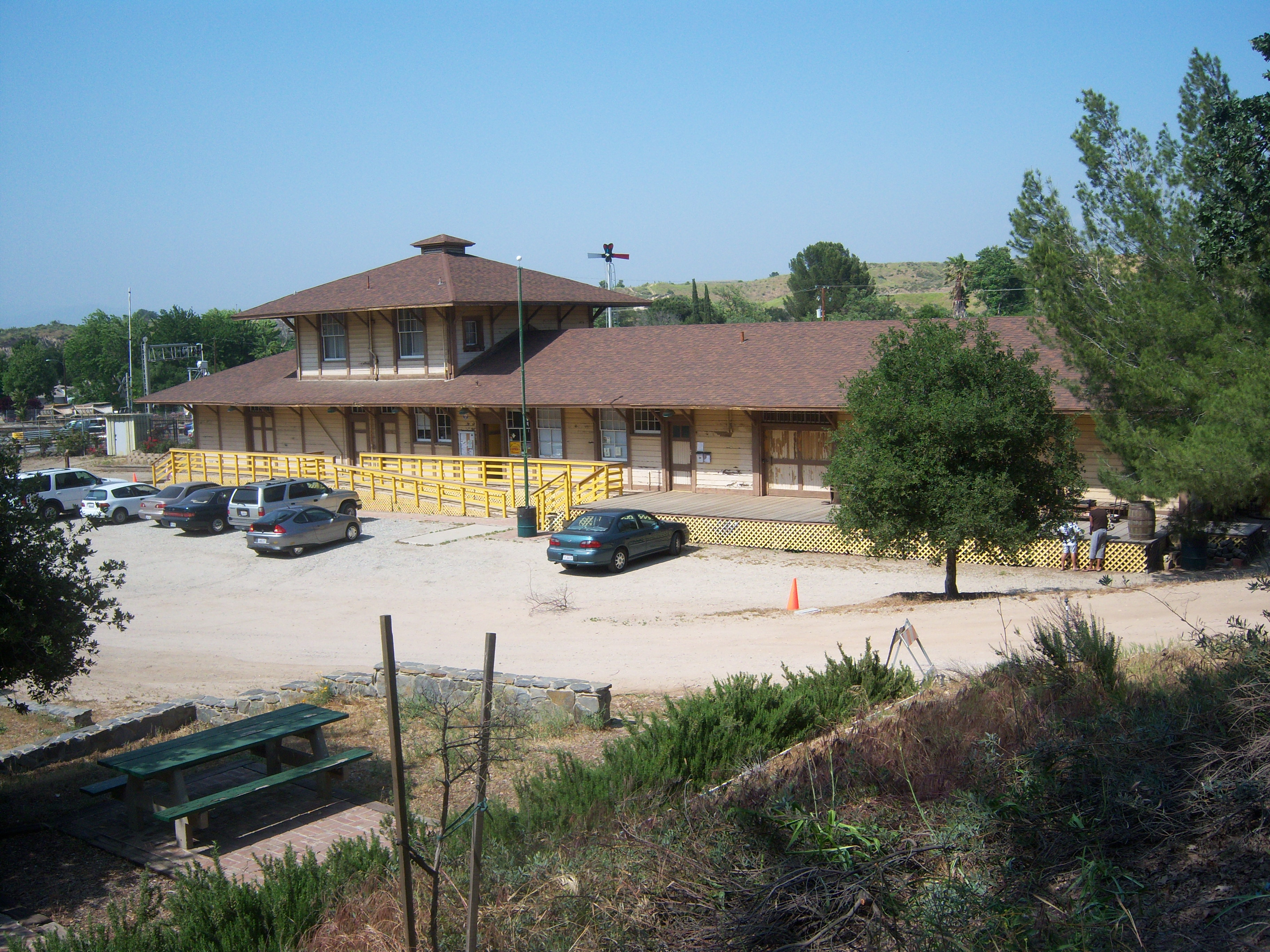
- The station at its current location, pictured in 2008

History
- Opened: September 1, 1887
- Closed: April 30, 1971
- Original company: Southern Pacific

Former services
Preceding station	Southern Pacific Railroad	Following station
Piru toward Montalvo	Santa Paula Branch	Terminus
Honby toward Oakland Pier	San Joaquin Valley Line	Newhall toward Los Angeles
Lancaster toward Oakland Pier	San Joaquin Daylight	Glendale toward Los Angeles
Location

Saugus station is a former train station. It provided the community of Saugus, California rail service via the Southern Pacific Railroad until 1979 when it was acquired by the Santa Clarita Valley Historical Society. The station building was moved to its current location in William S. Hart Park in the Newhall neighborhood and was converted to a museum.

== History ==
The station was located in Saugus, (Note: 34.4129°N 118.5405°W) and opened by the Southern Pacific Railroad on September 1, 1887 when the Santa Paula Branch Line was completed. The station provided an interchange between the railroad's three lines: the Santa Paula on to the Coast Line, the Soledad Canyon line on to Mojave, and the Valley line south to Los Angeles. The Saugus Cafe was founded in a building attached to the station. Passenger service ended with the discontinuation of the San Joaquin Daylight on April 30, 1971.

Freight service to Saugus ended in 1979, with the station building abandoned the previous November. The depot was acquired by the Santa Clarita Valley Historical Society and was moved to the William S. Hart Park on June 24, 1980.

== In popular culture ==
- The station has appeared in film and television spots, including: The Pilgrim, Suddenly, and The Grifters.
