= Pacific View Mall =

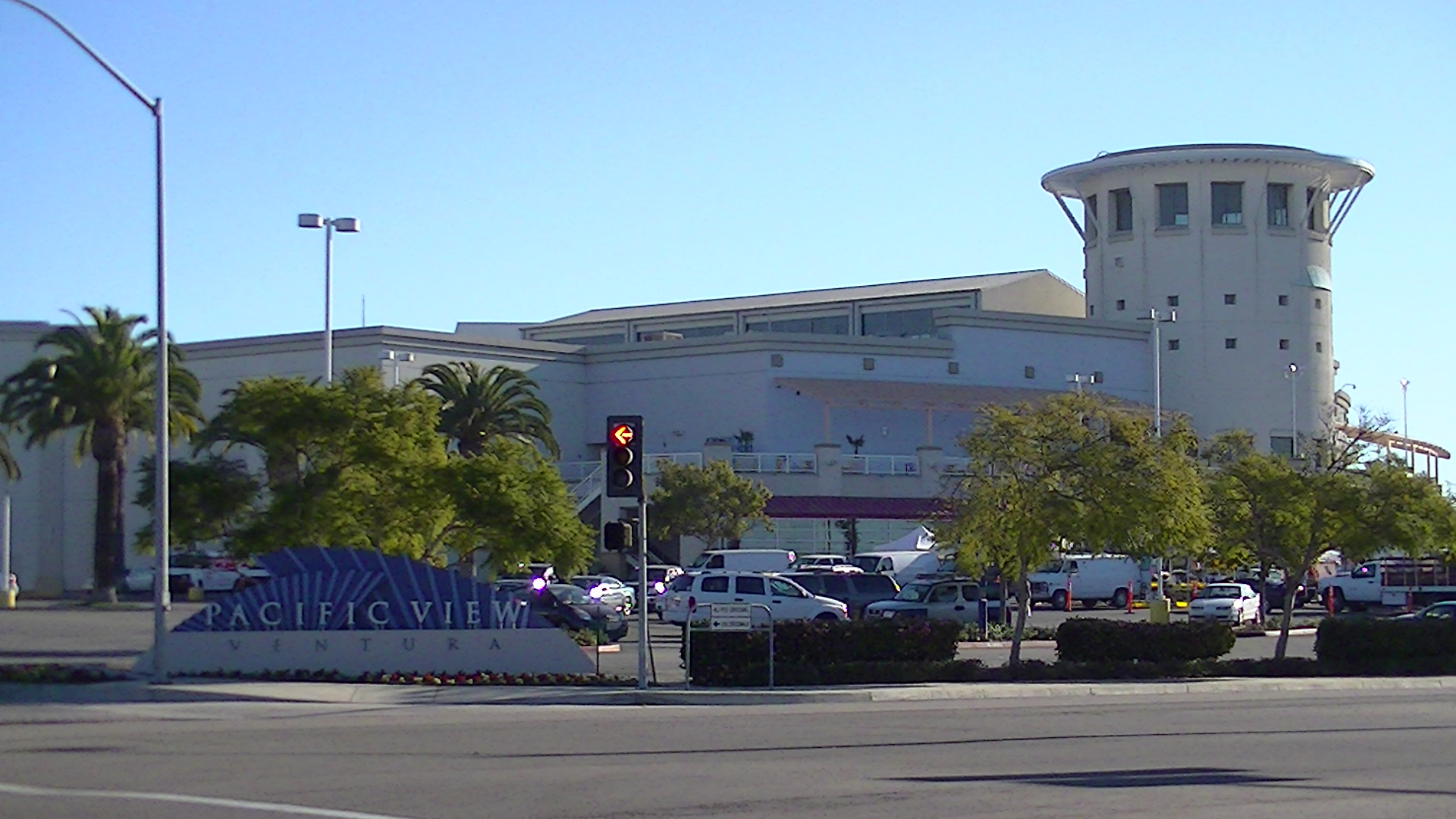
- Location: Ventura, California, United States
- Coordinates: 34.2698°N 119.2487°W
- Address: 3301-1 E Main St
- Opened: November 12, 1964; 61 years ago
- Developer: Broadway-Hale Stores and Gordon L. MacDonald
- Manager: Macerich
- Owner: Macerich
- Num. of stores: 144
- Num. of anchor tenants: 4 (3 open, 1 coming soon)
- Floor area: 970,424 sq ft (90,155.3 m^{2})
- Floors: 2 (3 in Macy's and former Sears)
- Website: www.shoppacificview.com

Pacific View Mall (formerly known as Buenaventura Center and Buenaventura Plaza) is a regional, enclosed mall located in Ventura, California. It covers a leasable area of almost 1,000,000 sq ft (93,000 m^{2}).

Its current anchors include Macy's, JCPenney, and Target, with one anchor store under construction being transformed into a Round1 in the former Sears.

== History ==
The open-air Buenaventura Center was built between 1962 and 1965, with its first store, The Broadway, opening in September 1963. Inline stores, such as Barker Brothers Furniture, Kimo's Polynesian Shop, F.W. Woolworth and a Vons-Shopping Bag Supermarket, opened during 1964. J.C. Penney began business in November 1965.

A Teflon-coated, fiberglass enclosure was installed in 1983. During the 1990s, after 30 years in operation, the mall began to show its age as tenants began to move out, and the vacancy rate rose. MCA Buenaventura Associates LP, the owners at the time, tried to revitalize the mall by expanding the available retail space and acquiring new anchor department stores.

In 1995, plans were announced to lure two major anchors: Robinsons-May and Sears, from the neighbouring Esplanade Mall in Oxnard. A year of tense political battles followed between Oxnard and Ventura and multiple lawsuits were filed. The pending litigation, along with debate regarding the mall's sales tax agreements, stalled the expansion negotiations with the major retailers. In 1996, The Broadway was converted to Macy's.

JCPenney moved to a smaller store in the mall in 1999, and Robinsons-May took over its old space. Sears opened a new store in that same year.

At the end of 1996, Macerich purchased Buenaventura Mall, as part of a deal that included two other shopping centers in the area for $125 million. Macerich, along with the old owners, continued to try to complete the project, and the proposals would drudge through the legal system for a few more years. In 2001, Macerich finally completed the expansion project, with an $89 million renovation that included the two new anchor department stores. The mall was renamed to Pacific View Mall during this time.

In 2006, the Robinsons-May store at the mall closed down after Federated Stores purchased The May Department Stores Company. Other tenants around it at the north end of the mall had also left, leaving that part of the mall empty with many vacant spaces. It remained that way for over a year until 2007, when it was announced a new 2-story Target store would occupy the anchor space.

In order to fill the empty building space at the north extension - located separately outside of the mall, a new Trader Joe's grocery store opened, accompanied by Staples, BevMo! and a Massage Envy spa. Later the old Barker Brothers furniture store was converted into 24 Hour Fitness.

In 2015, Sears Holdings spun off 235 of its properties, including the Sears at Pacific View Mall, into Seritage Growth Properties.

Larger tenants in the mall include Hollister Co., Victoria's Secret, Sephora, Old Navy, Macy's and American Eagle Outfitters.

On November 7, 2019, it was announced that Sears would be closing this location a part of a plan to close 96 stores nationwide. The store closed on February 2, 2020.

On November 14, 2019, it was announced that Forever 21 would be closing as part of a plan to close 111 stores nationwide. The store closed in January 2020.

In 2025, Round1 proposed an arcade in the former Sears. The two-story arcade, bowling alley, and food hall opened on October 10, 2026.
