= Ventura County Transportation Commission =

Public sector transportation planning body

Overview
- Chief executive: Martin R. Erickson
- Headquarters: 751 E. Daily Drive, Suite 420; Camarillo, CA 93010
- Website: www.goventura.org

The Ventura County Transportation Commission (VCTC) is the public sector transportation planning body for Ventura County, California. The VCTC oversees highway, bus, aviation, rail and bicycle activity and controls the use of government funds for transportation projects. The commission was created by state legislation in 1988 and began operation in 1989, when it assumed the transportation responsibilities of the Ventura County Association of Governments.

== Rail ==
The VCTC is one of five member agencies which make up the Southern California Regional Rail Authority (Metrolink).

The agency additionally owns a thirty-mile railway corridor (48 km) in the Santa Clara Valley, the Santa Paula Branch Line. The Sierra Northern Railway became the contract operator of the line in December 2021 after approval by the commission. Twelve miles (19 km) of the tracks and right of way were used by the Fillmore and Western Railway from 1991 to 2021.

== Bus ==
In 2012, a Regional Transit Plan was developed that called for the creation of three subregional service areas: the Gold Coast Transit District, serving the west county cities of Oxnard, Ventura, Port Hueneme, Ojai and unincorporated areas; the Heritage Valley Transit Service serving Fillmore, Santa Paula and Piru; and a less formal east county transit agreement covering Moorpark, Simi Valley, Thousand Oaks, Camarillo and unincorporated areas. The commission would continue to oversee the intercity bus system, Ventura Intercity Service Transit Authority.

In 2015, the commission oversaw the creation of the Heritage Valley Transit Service and the beginning of four fixed-route bus lines in Fillmore, Santa Paula and Piru using 16-seat buses. The Valley Express was established under a cooperative agreement between the cities of Fillmore Santa Paula, the county of Ventura (Piru and unincorporated areas) and the commission.
