= Esplanade Shopping Center =

- Location: Oxnard, California
- Coordinates: 34.234787°N 119.179035°W
- Address: 195 W. Esplanade Drive, Oxnard, CA 93036
- Previous names: Esplanade Mall
- Owner: Primestor
- Floor area: 356,864 square feet (33,153.8 m^{2})
- Floors: 1
- Website: Official website

The Esplanade Shopping Center is a power center in Oxnard, California. It replaced the Esplanade Mall which was Ventura County's first fully enclosed shopping center and was anchored by May Company California and Sears. Anchor stores include Home Depot, Nordstrom Rack, Staples, Dick's Sporting Goods, Party City and Food 4 Less.

== Description ==
The enclosed mall was demolished in August 2000 and replaced by ay open-air center, known as the Esplanade Shopping Center, the first stores opening in September 2001. These included Cost Plus World Market and Bed Bath & Beyond. A 136,000-square-foot Home Depot opened later in February 2002. The Target store (built in 1983), which relocated to The Collection at RiverPark in 2012, was demolished for a new Food 4 Less market.

== Former mall ==
Construction began on September 16, 1968, on a $3-million 276,595-square-foot (25,696.5 m^{2}) Sears with two above-ground levels and a basement. The store welcomed its first shoppers in February, 1970.

The single-level wing of specialty stores opened, with thirty-four initial stores, on March 5, 1970. The architect for both was Burke, Kober, Nicolais & Archuleta. S. H. Kress & Co. five-and-dime, Harris & Frank and Silverwoods were among the junior department stores at the mall's launch. In total the mall sat on 45 acres (18 ha). Alongside the mall existed Disco Fair, which later rebranded as Two Guys and FedMart in the 1970's and Target in 1983.

A 2-level, 150,000-square-foot (14,000 m^{2}) May Company California was the final original anchor to open on November 2, 1970 and was rebranded Robinsons-May in 1993. The 2-story emporium was designed by Pasadena architects Ladd and Kelsey.

In 1999, the anchors Robinsons-May and Sears moved from Esplanade to the Buenaventura Mall in Ventura.
