= Santa Clara River Valley =

Valley along the Santa Clara River in Los Angeles and Ventura counties, California

- Heritage Valley
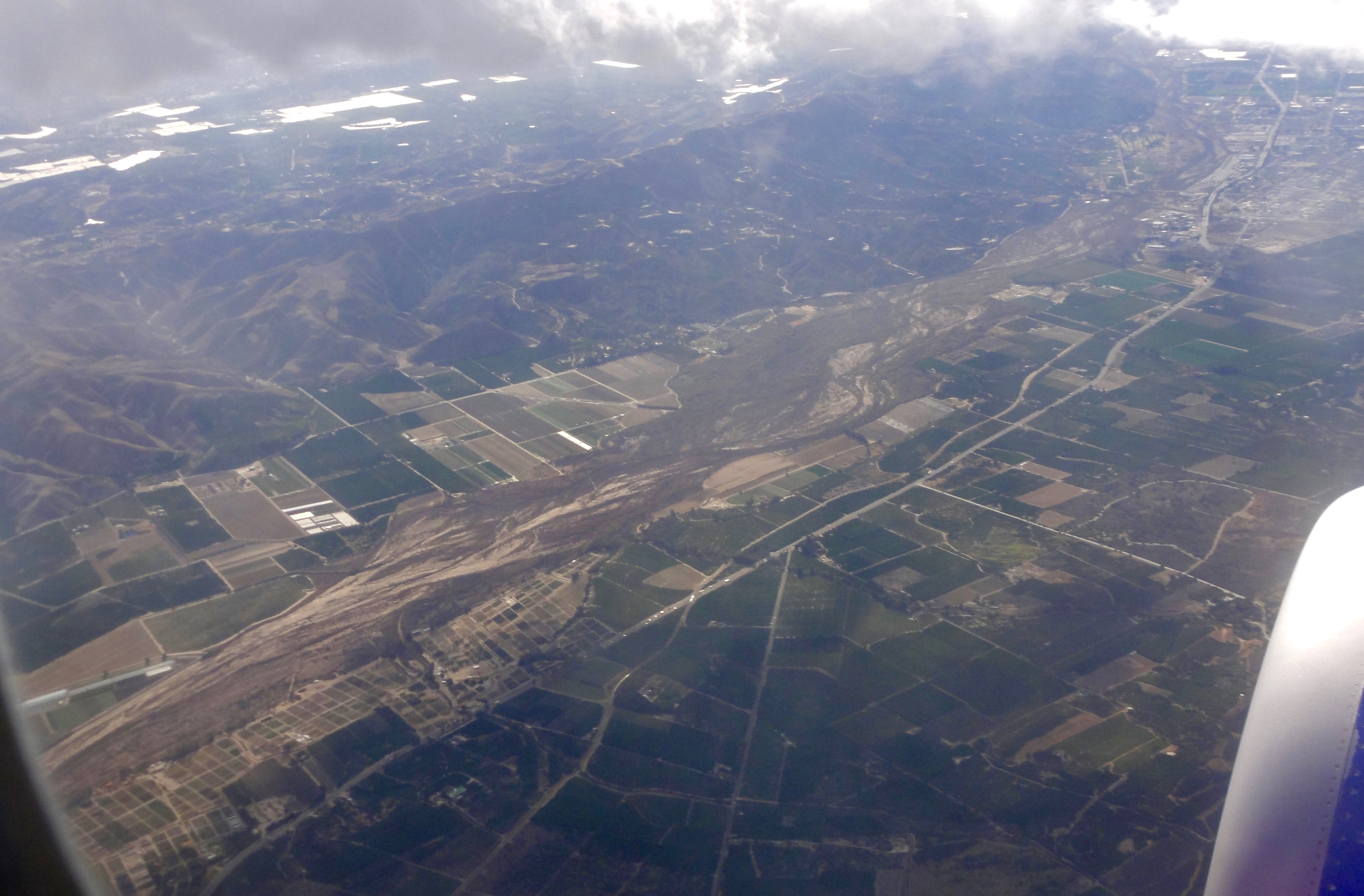
- Aerial view of the Santa Clara River Valley, with CA 126 running along the northern banks of the Santa Clara River

- Location within California

Geography
- Location: Los Angeles and Ventura counties
- Country: United States
- State: California
- Population center: Santa Paula and Fillmore
- Borders on: Oxnard Plain (southwest); Santa Clarita Valley (east)
- Coordinates: 34.37°N 118.98°W
- Traversed by: State Route 126
- River: Santa Clara River
- Interactive map of Santa Clara River Valley

The Santa Clara River Valley is a rural, mainly agricultural valley in Ventura County, California that has been given the moniker Heritage Valley by the namesake tourism bureau. The valley includes the communities of Santa Paula, Fillmore, Piru and the National Historic Landmark of Rancho Camulos. Named for the Santa Clara River, which winds through the valley before emptying into the Pacific Ocean between the cities of Ventura and Oxnard, the tourist bureau describes it as "Southern California's last pristine agricultural valley nestled along the banks of the free-flowing Santa Clara River."

== Geography ==
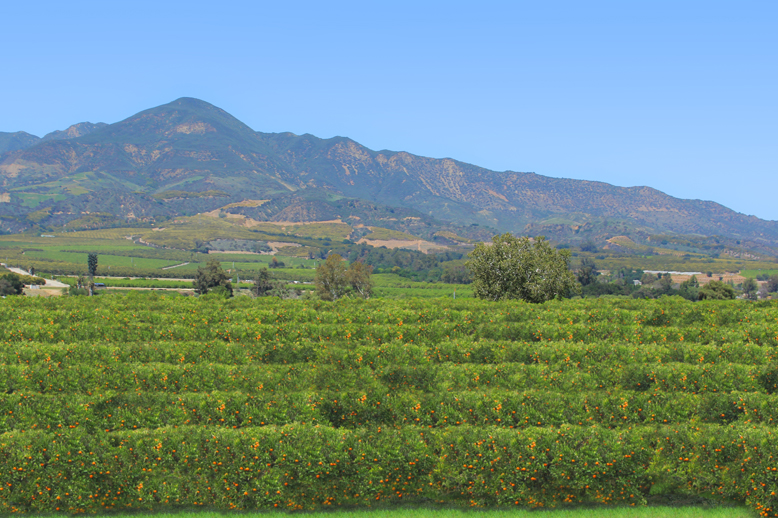
Orange groves of the Santa Clara River Valley

The Santa Clara River Valley is bordered by the Topatopa Mountains, Los Padres National Forest, and Sespe Condor Sanctuary to the north and the Santa Susana Mountains to the south. The valley stretches from the boundary of northwest Los Angeles County and the northern Santa Clarita Valley on the east to the Oxnard Plain on the west marked by South Mountain on the south bank of the river. The Santa Clarita Valley is part of the upper watershed of the river.

== Climate ==
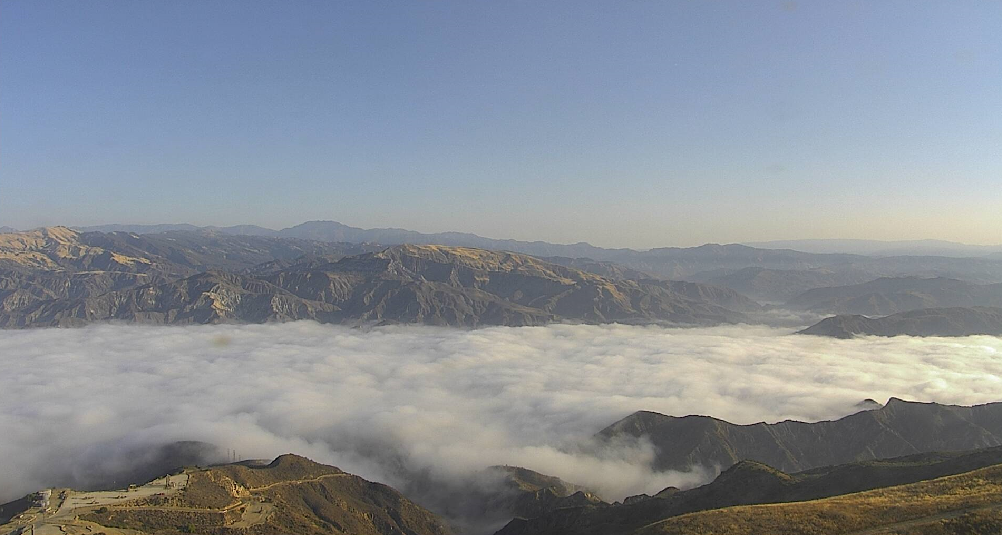
Morning fog in the Santa Clara River Valley, viewed from Torrey Peak near Piru, California

The valley has been called one of the "most dangerous wind and fire corridors in Southern California." It forms a connection between the high desert and the coast, which serves as a "wind-tunnel-like-corridor" for funneling Santa Ana winds, which spread wildfires. This served to spread the Maria Fire, one of the 2019 California wildfires. This valley has also suffered through the Saddleridge Fire in 2019, the Creek Fire and the Thomas Fire in 2017, and the Sayre Fire in 2008.

=== Floods ===
The failure and near complete collapse of the St. Francis Dam took place in the middle of the night on March 12, 1928. The dam was holding a full reservoir of 12.4 billion gallons (47 billion liters) of water that surged down San Francisquito Canyon and emptied into the Santa Clara River, flowing down the river valley to the ocean.

== History ==
A footpath through the valley was the only route linking the San Fernando and San Buenaventura missions for 18th-century Spanish missionaries. Thomas Bard launched a campaign in the 1870s to build a road through the valley as he wanted to connect the new Hueneme wharf with ore mines in Inyo County

The valley is an exception to the post-war urban development that has almost eliminated citrus cultivation throughout most of Southern California.

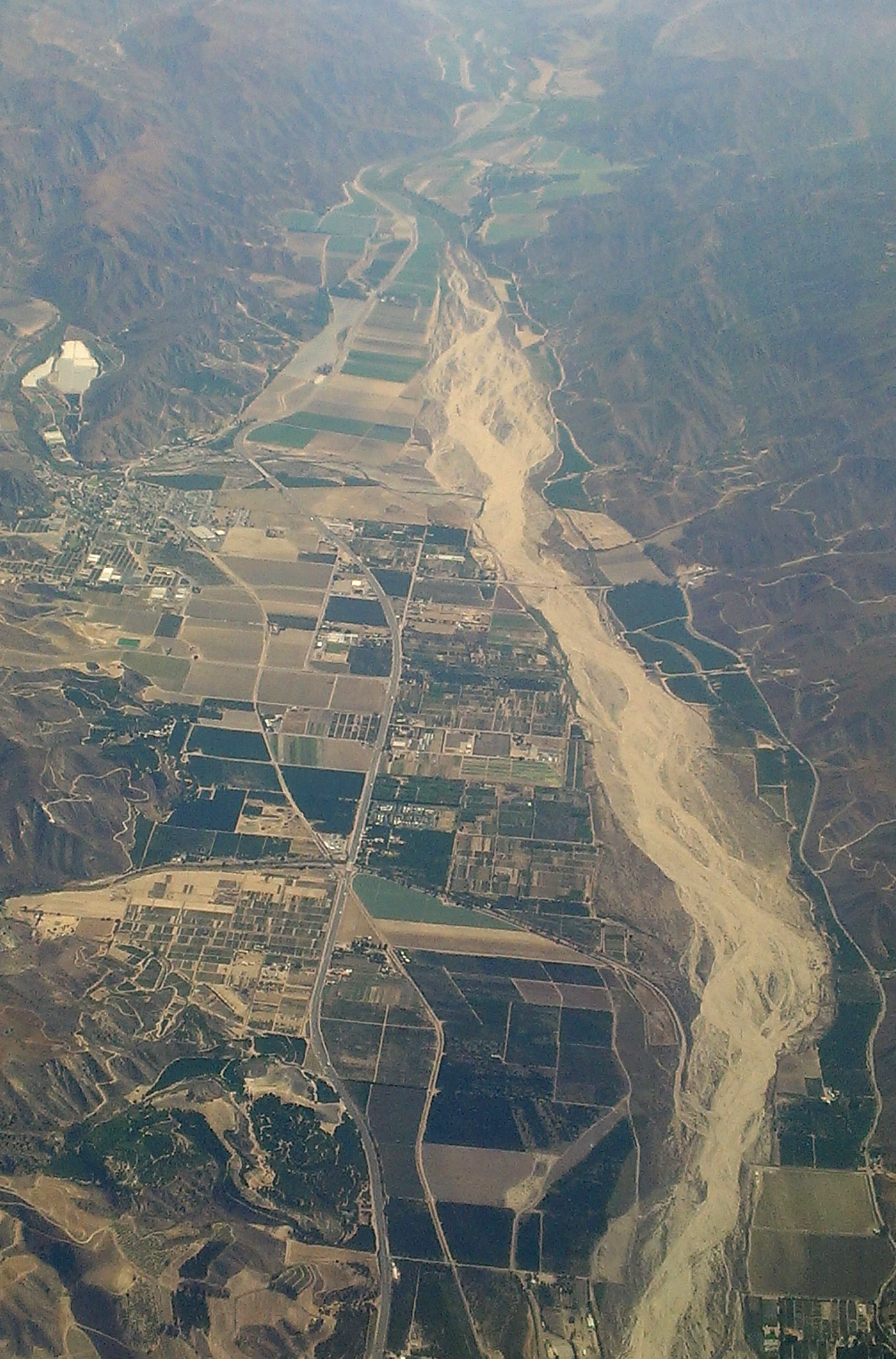
Aerial view of the Santa Clara River, with Piru at center left

== Transportation ==
- Route 126 - the main E-W highway serving the valley.
- Route 150 - a minor E-W highway connecting Ojai to the valley.
- Route 23 - a minor N-S highway connecting Fillmore to the Conejo Valley.
- Santa Paula Branch Line - the railway corridor through the valley, mostly used for excursions.
