= Ventura–East station =

Metrolink train station in Ventura, California, US

Ventura–East
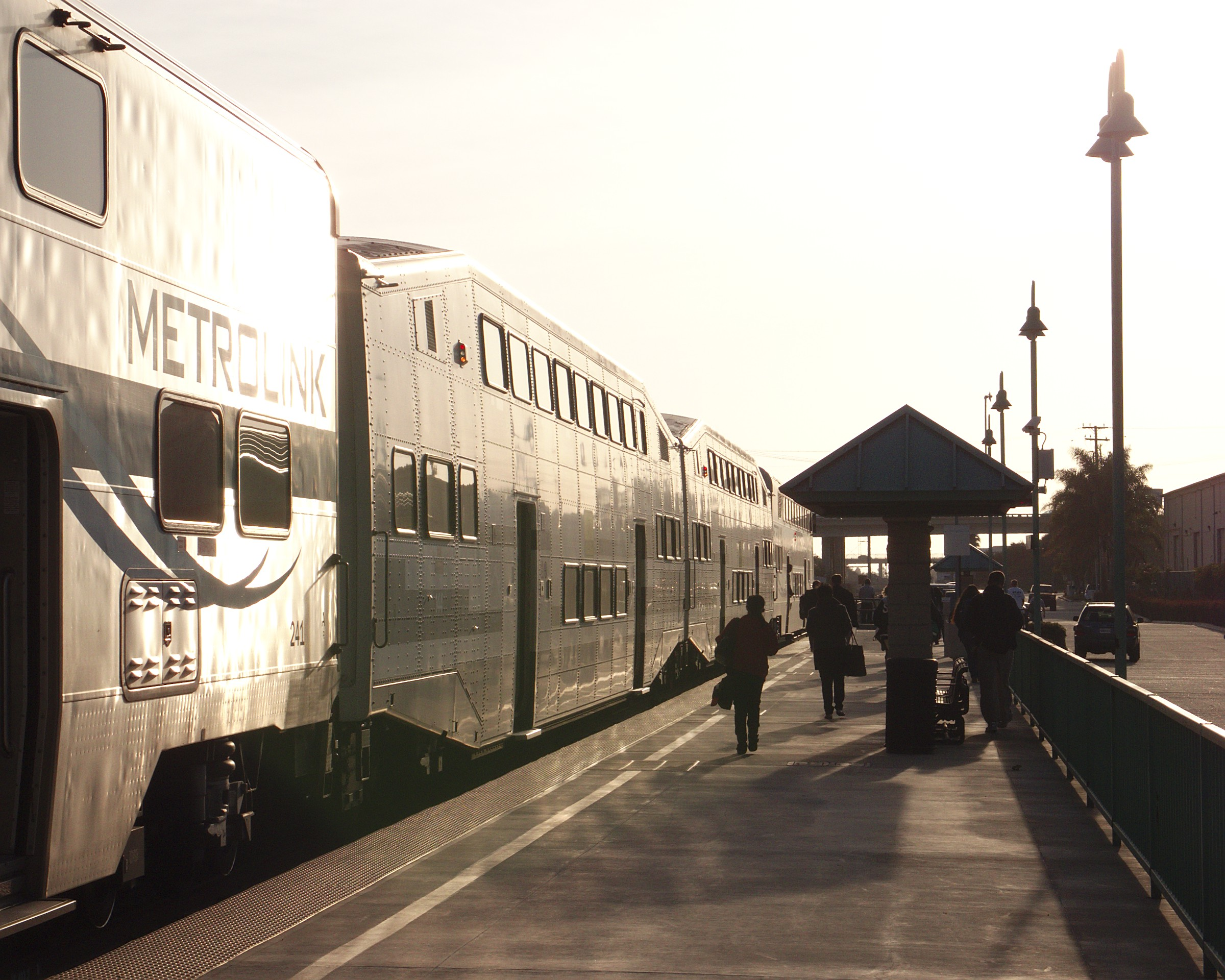
- Ventura–East station at sunset, 2014

General information
- Location: 6175 Ventura Boulevard; Ventura, California
- Coordinates: 34°15′02″N 119°12′14″W
- Line: SCRRA Montalvo Subdivision
- Platforms: 1 side platform
- Tracks: 2
- Connections: Gold Coast Transit: 6

Construction
- Structure type: At-grade
- Parking: 60 spaces, 3 accessible spaces
- Cycle facilities: Racks and lockers
- Accessible: Yes

Other information
- Status: Unstaffed

History
- Opened: November 11, 2002; 23 years ago
- Former names: Montalvo

Passengers
- FY 2026: 16 (avg. wkdy boardings)

Services
Preceding station	Metrolink	Following station
Terminus	Ventura County Line	Oxnard toward L.A. Union Station
Former services
Preceding station	Southern Pacific Railroad	Following station
Ventura toward San Francisco	Coast Line	Oxnard toward Los Angeles
Terminus	Santa Paula Branch	Saticoy toward Saugus
Location

Ventura–East station (formerly Montalvo station and also known as East Ventura station) is a Metrolink passenger train station in the Montalvo neighborhood of Ventura, California. Passengers board here for Metrolink's Ventura County Line going towards Los Angeles Union Station. The platform is just off the main coast route on the Santa Paula Branch Line which is owned by the Ventura County Transportation Commission. Because of its location, trains must reverse into the station from the east.

6 Metrolink Ventura County Line trains (3 in each direction) serve the station each weekday, running during peak hours in the peak direction of travel. 2 round trips operate on weekends.

The station opened for regular service on November 11, 2002; a grand opening ceremony took place on November 8. Prior to that, Metrolink trains that ran from Los Angeles to Oxnard were stored overnight at this site with no passenger boardings.

Amtrak's Pacific Surfliner remains on the Coast line towards downtown Ventura and Santa Barbara, and does not switch over to serve this station. Growth in commuters traveling towards Los Angeles is expected to favor this location over the (downtown) Ventura station used by the Pacific Surfliner. Overnight storage of trains in downtown would also be expensive if that station was used.

On May 9, 2011, Metrolink renamed the station from Montalvo to Ventura–East due to the lack of name recognition. Montalvo had been the name of the junction at this location for over a hundred years and subsequently the community, later annexed by the city of Ventura, that grew adjacent to the junction.
