= Santa Paula Branch Line =

Railway corridor in California

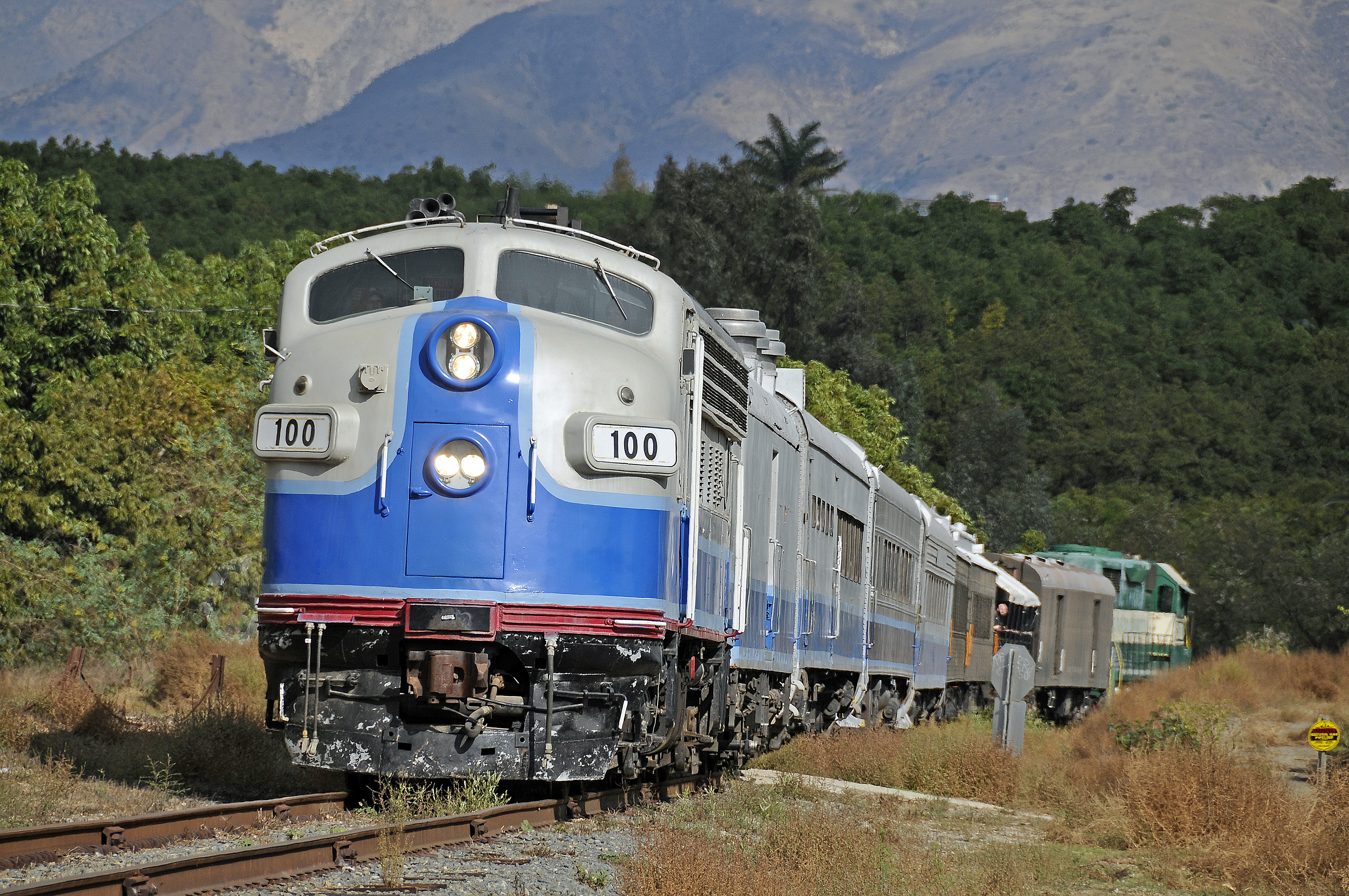
A Fillmore and Western Railway excursion operating over the Santa Paula Branch Line in 2014

The Santa Paula Branch Line is a railway corridor in Ventura County, California. It connects Saugus and Santa Paula through the Santa Clara River Valley, though the route east of Piru is out of service. It opened for traffic by the Southern Pacific Railroad in 1887. Since 1995, the line has been owned by the Ventura County Transportation Commission.

== History ==
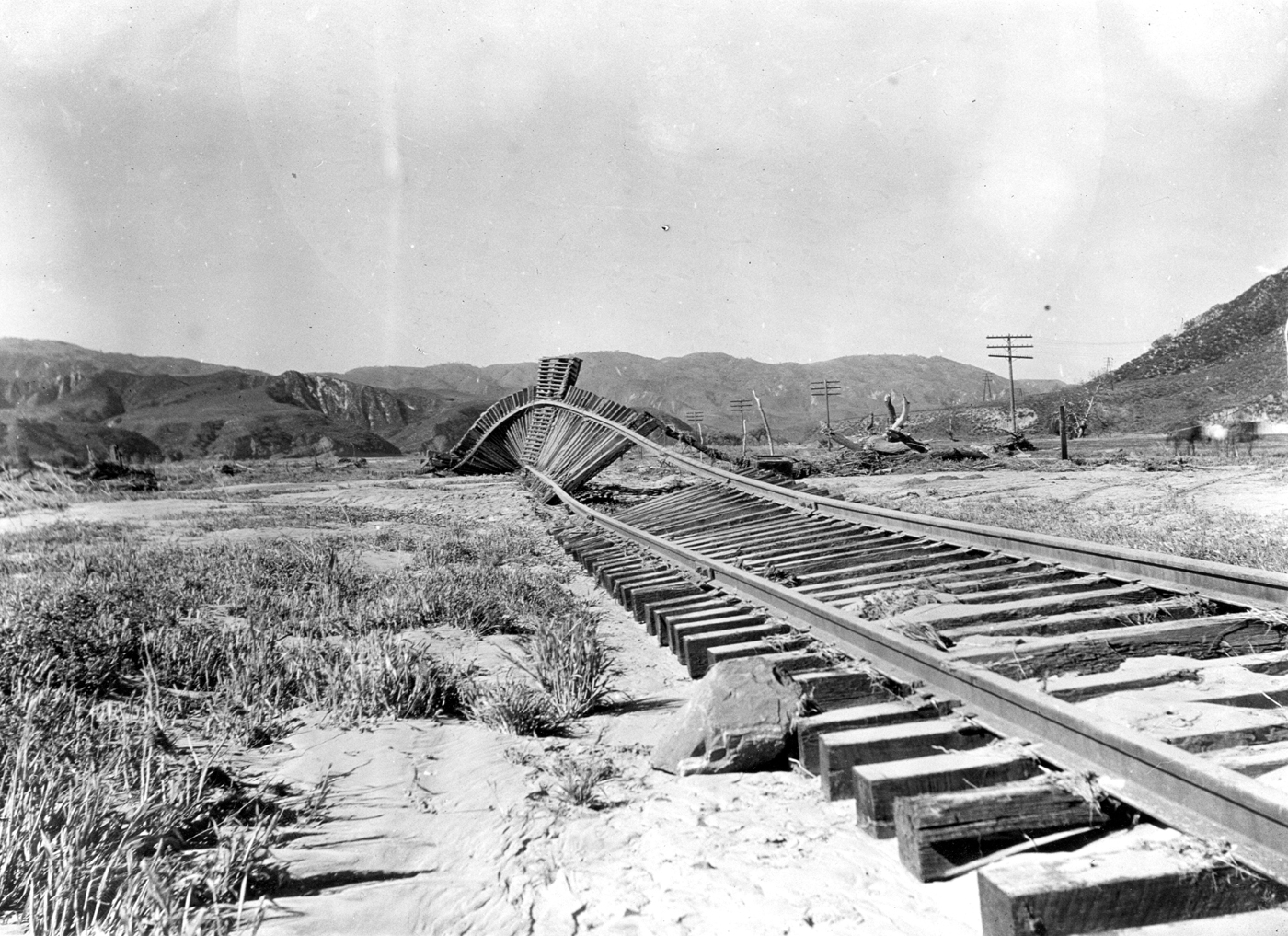
The mangled line caused by the St. Francis Dam Flood on March 12–13, 1928. Track pictured is between Castaic Junction and Piru.

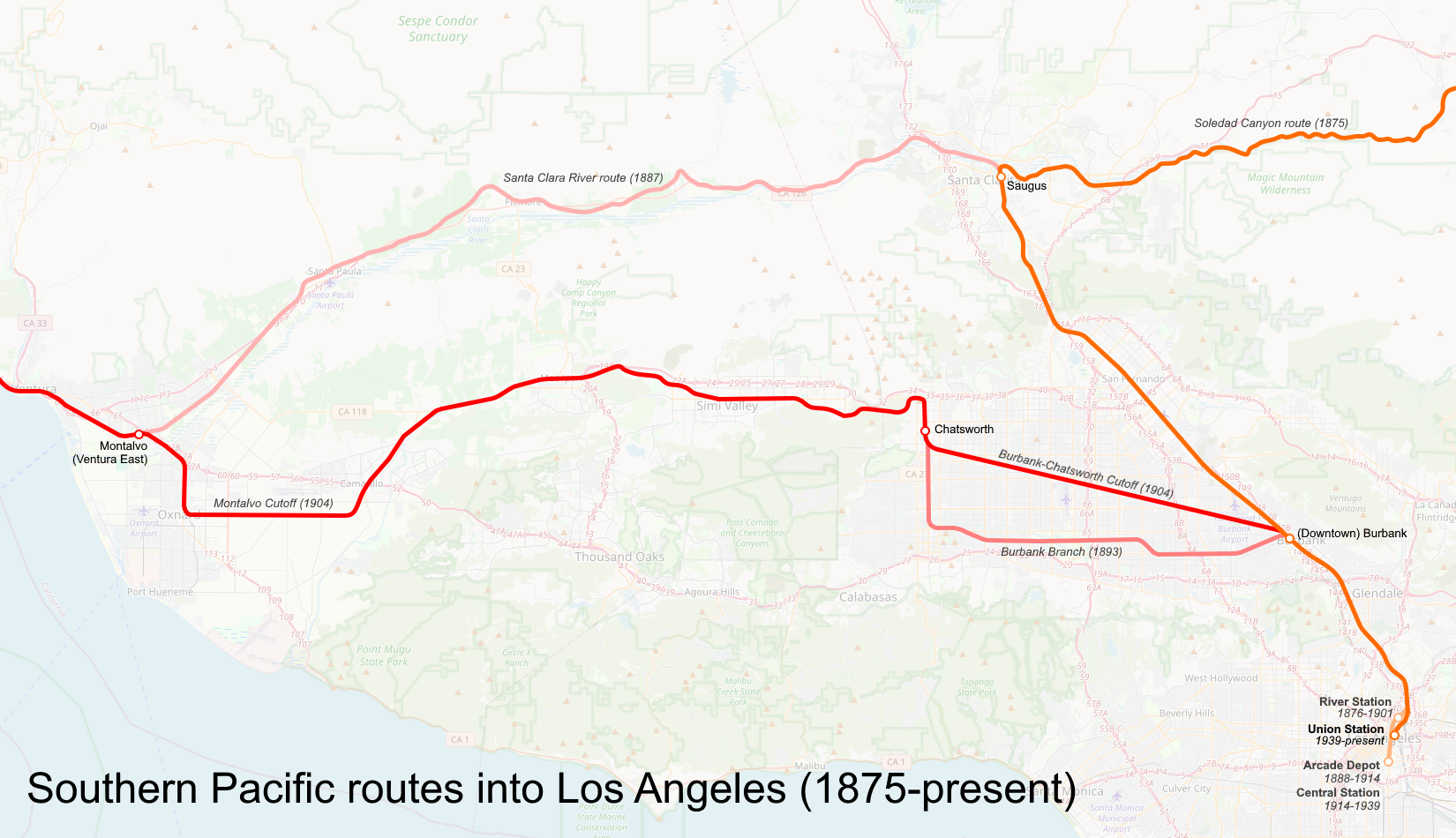
Map of the Southern Pacific Railroad's different routes into Los Angeles (bottom right of image) from the north — the Santa Paula branch line is near the top of the image in light red

The track is a standard gauge railroad constructed in 1887 by the Southern Pacific Branch Railway Company (a company controlled by and later absorbed into the Southern Pacific Railroad) through the Santa Clara River Valley in Ventura County, California. This line was originally part of the Southern Pacific's main line between San Francisco and Los Angeles before the shorter Montalvo Cutoff was built through the Santa Susana Mountains in 1904. State Route 126 follows roughly the same route from Ventura to Santa Clarita. Much of the line was destroyed by flooding from the St. Francis Dam failure in 1928. The track was used extensively by Southern Pacific as late as the 1950s to haul citrus from packing houses at the communities along the Santa Clara River. The eastern end of the line terminates in Piru as storm damage in 1979 severed the eastern end to Saugus in Los Angeles County. Southern Pacific formally abandoned the line in 1983. In 1995, the Ventura County Transportation Commission purchased the branch line from Southern Pacific.

The Fillmore and Western Railway rented the line starting in 1991. The company operated excursion trains as well as hosted trains for film shoots. Fillmore and Western's lease agreement expired after June 30, 2021. The final scheduled excursion trip was on June 26. In 2021, Sierra Northern Railway signed a 30-year lease to operate over the Santa Paula Branch Line. They will also maintain the rail line. During the first year of operation, they ran one train a week and continued pursuing the filming business. Sierra Northern's sister company Mendocino Railway operates the Sunburst, which runs railbikes on a portion of the line. A section of the bridge over Sespe Creek washed away on January 10, 2023, during the extended rain storms that hit California.

A three-mile section has been used for testing automated, battery-powered railway cars.

== Proposed upgrade and expansion ==
Transportation planners in the Southern California region have been studying the feasibility of restoring the eastern end of the line between Santa Paula and Santa Clarita in order to establish Metrolink service, at least since 1991. This would require bringing existing track up to passenger standards, adding passing sidings and acquisition of new right-of-way for track between the current eastern terminus of the line located just west of Interstate 5 (I-5) and Metrolink's Antelope Valley Line. The new line would also require construction of a bridge over the south fork of the Santa Clara River and an at-grade crossing or a flying junction at San Fernando Road. This line would have the potential to relieve some of the current commuter load on the I-5 corridor between State Route 126 and State Route 14 as well as providing future commute options for housing development in northern Los Angeles County and Ventura County communities in the Santa Clara River Valley.

== Rail trail ==
Segments of the line in Santa Paula, Fillmore, and Piru are paralleled by the Santa Paula Branch Line Recreational Trail.
