= Coast Line (California) =

Railroad line in California along the Pacific coast from Los Angeles to the Bay Area

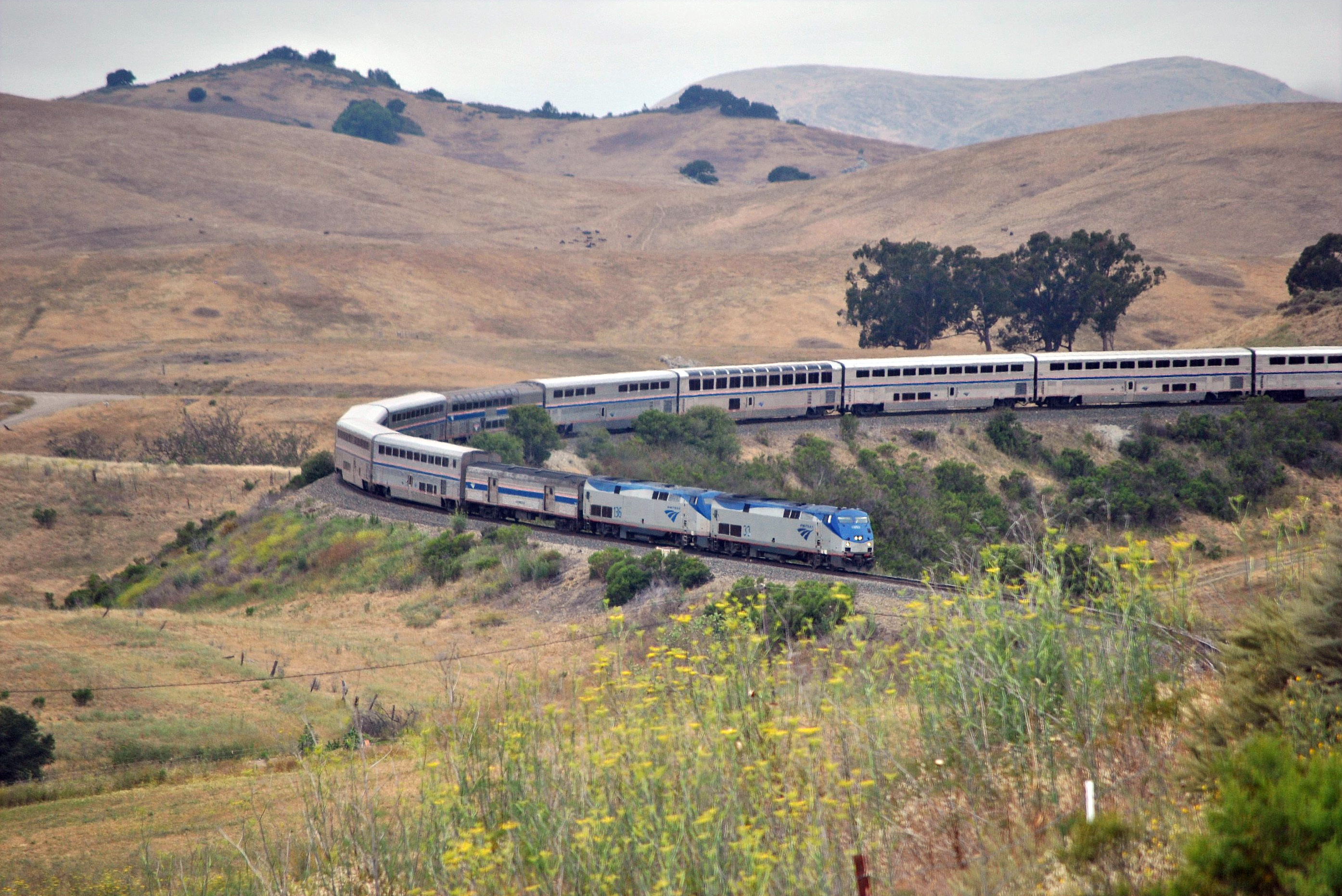
- The Coast Starlight navigating a horseshoe curve on the lower Cuesta Grade near San Luis Obispo.

Overview
- Owner: Peninsula Corridor Joint Powers Board (San Francisco–Tamien); Union Pacific Railroad (Tamien–Moorpark); Southern California Regional Rail Authority (Moorpark–Los Angeles)
- Locale: San Francisco Bay Area; Central Coast; Greater Los Angeles
- Termini: San Francisco; Burbank
- Connecting lines: Peninsula Subdivision; Coast Subdivision; Santa Barbara Subdivision; Ventura Subdivision
- Stations: 68

Service
- Type: Commuter rail; Freight rail; Inter-city rail
- Operators: Amtrak; Caltrain; Metrolink; Altamont Corridor Express

History
- Commenced: 1860; 166 years ago
- Opened: January 16, 1864; 162 years ago
- Completed: December 31, 1900; 125 years ago

Technical
- Line length: 470 mi (760 km)
- Number of tracks: 1–4
- Track gauge: 1,435 mm (4 ft 8 1/2 in) standard gauge
- Electrification: Overhead line, 25 kV 60 Hz AC (San Francisco–Tamien)
- Train protection system: Positive train control (PTC)

The Coast Line is a railway line between Burbank, California (Note: 34.1861°N 118.321°W Burbank Cutoff) and the San Francisco Bay Area, roughly along the Pacific Coast. It is the shortest rail route between Los Angeles and the Bay Area. Though not as busy as the Surf Line, the continuation of the Coast Line southbound to San Diego, it still sees freight movements and many passenger trains. The Pacific Surfliner, which runs from the San Diego Santa Fe Depot to San Luis Obispo via Union Station in Los Angeles, is the third busiest Amtrak route, and the busiest outside of the Northeast Corridor between Washington D.C. and Boston.

== History ==
=== Predecessors ===
The San Francisco and San Jose Railroad built the first segment of the line from San Francisco to San Jose between 1860 and 1864. The founders of the SF&SJ incorporated as the Southern Pacific Railroad, which was authorized by Congress in 1866 to connect the line from San Jose south to Needles, where it would meet the Atlantic & Pacific Railroad. The Southern Pacific Railroad had built to Tres Pinos by 1873, however they abandoned efforts to continue the line to Coalinga, instead choosing a more inland route from Lathrop.

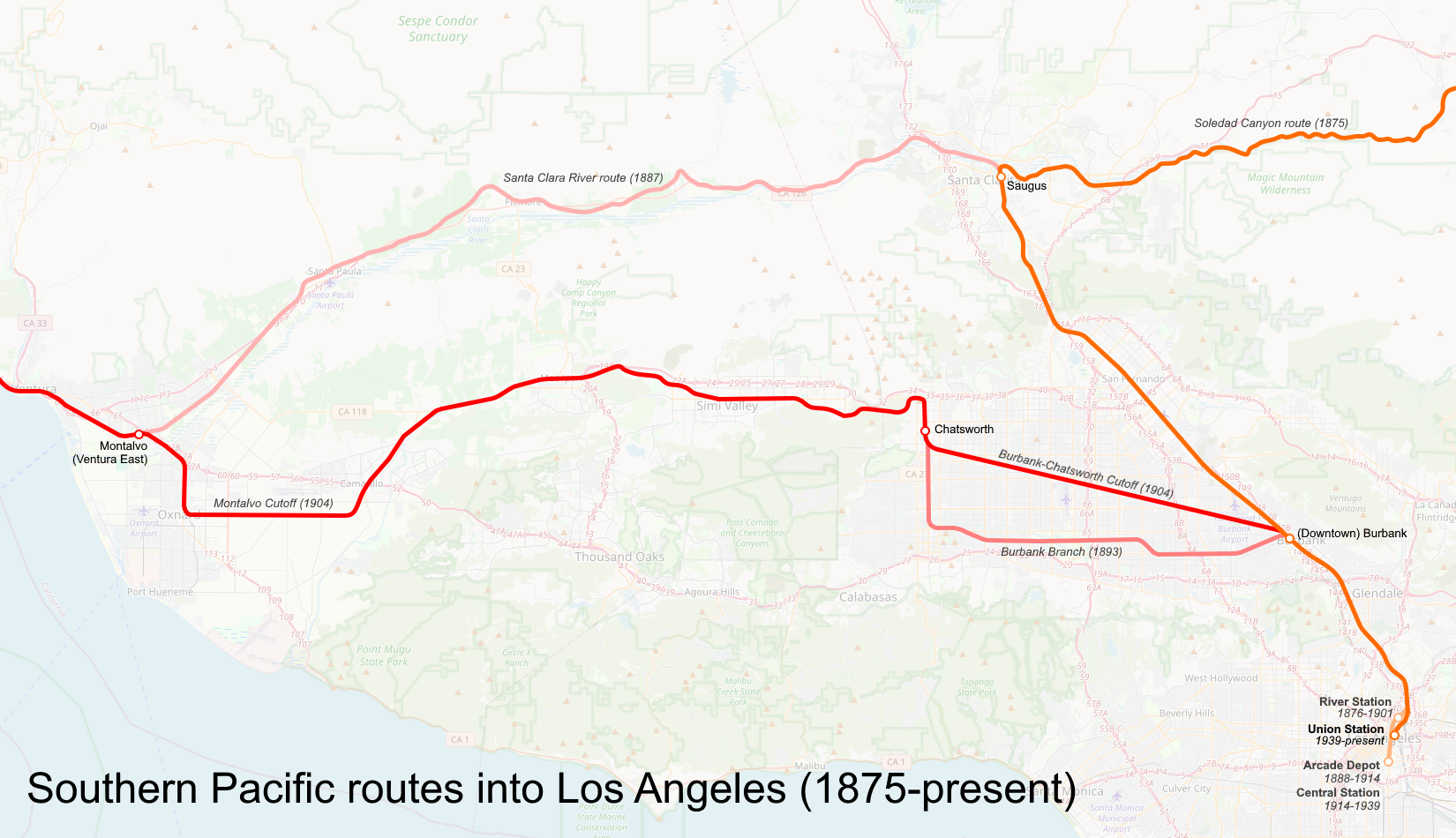
Map of the Southern Pacific Railroad's different routes into Los Angeles from the north

By 1871, SP had completed a line south from San Jose through Gilroy and Pajaro, arriving at Salinas in 1872 and Soledad in 1873. SP halted southward work at Soledad for thirteen years and started building north from Los Angeles in 1873, completing a line to Burbank. In 1886, SP had pushed south from Soledad to King City, Paso Robles, and Templeton. Two routes through to Santa Barbara from Los Angeles were considered by the company: one following the Santa Clara River Valley and a second further south across Santa Susana Pass. The former was determined to be both cheaper and quicker to initially build, though the more expensive route was also seen as a desirable future addition. By 1887, the southern portion of the line had been extended through Newhall, Saugus, and Santa Paula to Santa Barbara.

By 1894, SP had extended the line south over the Cuesta Pass from Templeton to San Luis Obispo. The work continued south to Guadalupe in 1895 and Surf in 1896. The 80-mile (130 km) gap between Surf and Santa Barbara was closed with the last spike driven on December 28, 1900.

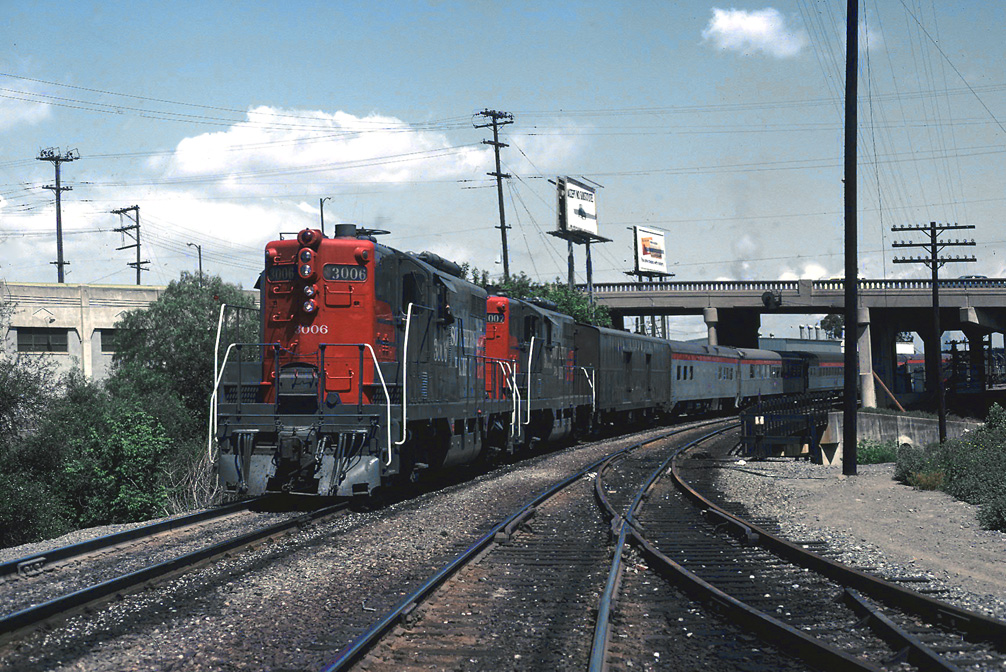
Southbound Coast Daylight, at Auzerais Street in San Jose in April 1970

The first version of the Coast Line was completed by the Southern Pacific Railroad on December 31, 1900 when a train was run over the bridge at Cementerio, west of Goleta. Regular service did not begin immediately, pending track ballast work on several miles of the new line. It differed from the modern line with the original route running via the Ocean View line in San Francisco, the Market Street Depot in San Jose, Saugus and Santa Paula through the Santa Clara River Valley, and south into Los Angeles via the Valley Line. Passenger service began on March 31. (Note: Ryan, MaryEllen; Breschini, Ph.D., Gary S. "Railroads of the Central Coast—An Overview". Monterey County Historical Society. gives the date as January 7)

The work between Ventura and Carpenteria eventually allowed the construction of the Rincon sea-level road for automobile traffic to travel this formerly impassible section of coastline.

Work on the Montalvo Cutoff, (Note: Ventura, 34.24917°N 119.2129°W) which crossed the Santa Clara River to serve the farmers in the Oxnard Plain and was extended to Santa Susana in Simi Valley, began in 1898. The Santa Susana Tunnel opened in 1904 connecting with the Chatsworth cutoff from Burbank and thereafter was the main line. Passenger and freight traffic declined dramatically at the Hueneme wharf in Ventura County as they shifted to the railroad. A new straighter track was built between Chatsworth and Burbank to coincide with the new route, and the original line through the San Fernando Valley was designated as the Burbank branch. In 1907, the Bayshore Cutoff opened from San Bruno (Note: San Bruno,37.631°N 122.412°W) to San Francisco, relegating the original main line through the Bernal Cut to branch status. In 1935 the new line around downtown San Jose opened (Note: Between 37.3414°N 121.9127°W to 37.2848°N 121.8427°W) and thereafter was the main line.

In the golden era of passenger service, SP trains on the San Francisco leg of this route ran from the Third and Townsend Depot in San Francisco to the Union Station in Los Angeles. The Oakland–Los Angeles trains originated from the 16th Street Station in Oakland.

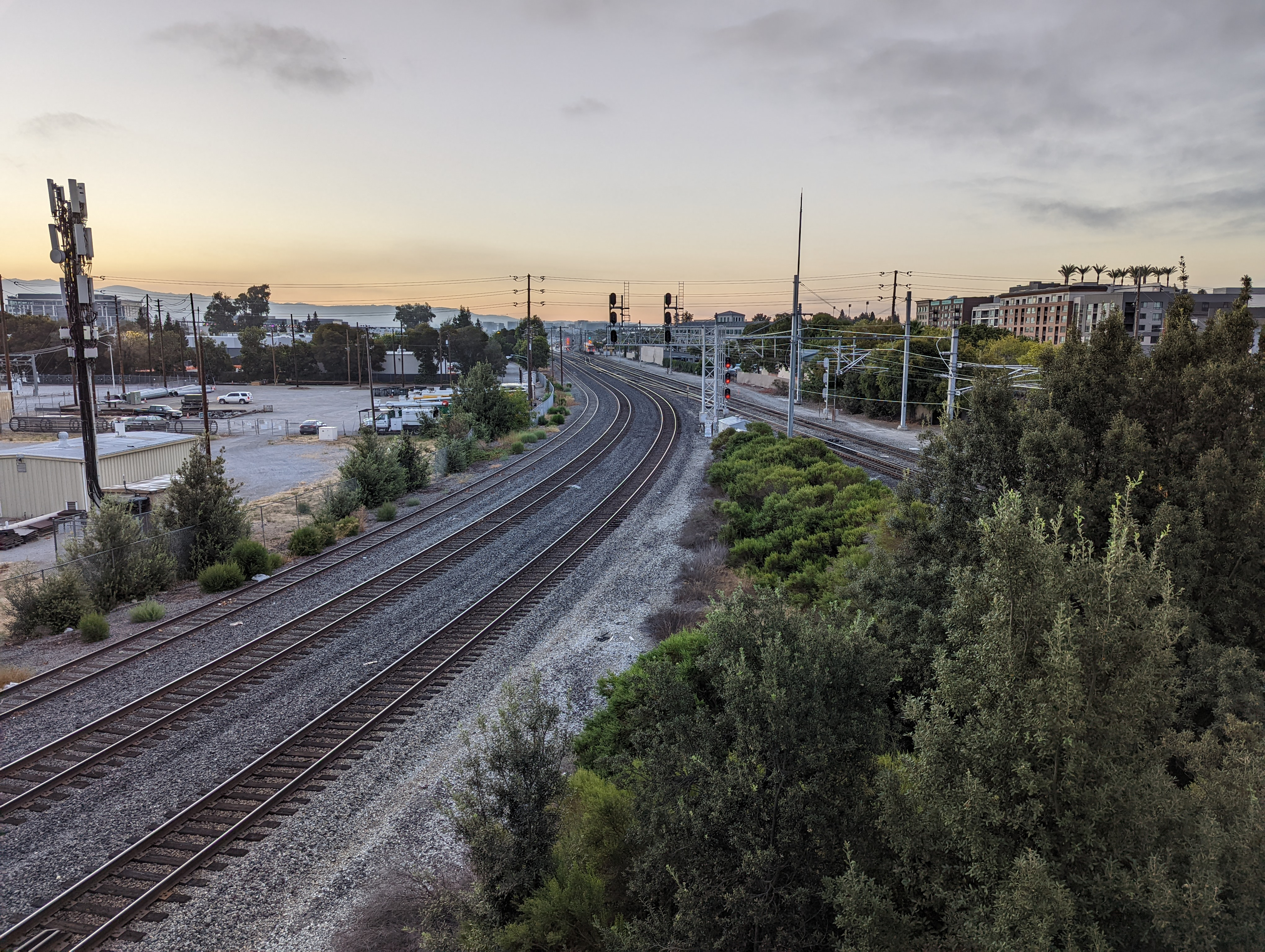
Looking south at the junction of the Coast Subdivision (left) and Peninsula Corridor (right), Santa Clara (2022)

=== Current lines ===
The line has several subdivisions. Ownership is currently split into three segments:

- Caltrain (PCJPB) from CP Lick (MP 51.6, south of Tamien yard) north to San Francisco
- Union Pacific Railroad (UP), which merged with Southern Pacific (SP) in 1996, from CP Lick south to the north end of Moorpark (Note: Moorpark, about 34.28488°N 118.891°W)
  - Between CP Lick (MP 51.6) and CP Coast (MP 43.9), the Coast Line is owned by PCJPB. At CP Coast, north of Santa Clara Transit Center, the UP Coast Subdivision resumes and branches from the Peninsula Corridor, traveling north/northeast to CP Newark (MP 31.0), where it joins with the Niles Subdivision.
- Metrolink south of Moorpark

The Peninsula Corridor Joint Powers Board purchased the line on the San Francisco Peninsula north of Tamien in 1991, and the line north of Santa Clara is primarily used by passenger services. In 1992, Southern Pacific granted the Los Angeles County Transportation Commission an option to purchase the entire Coast Line for passenger train operations at 110 mi/h (180 km/h). Upgrades to signals and tracks to enable higher-speed operations were estimated to cost $360 million at the time. In the case of both purchases, SP retained freight trackage rights along those lines which continue to be held by the company's successor, Union Pacific.

== Services ==
=== Freight ===
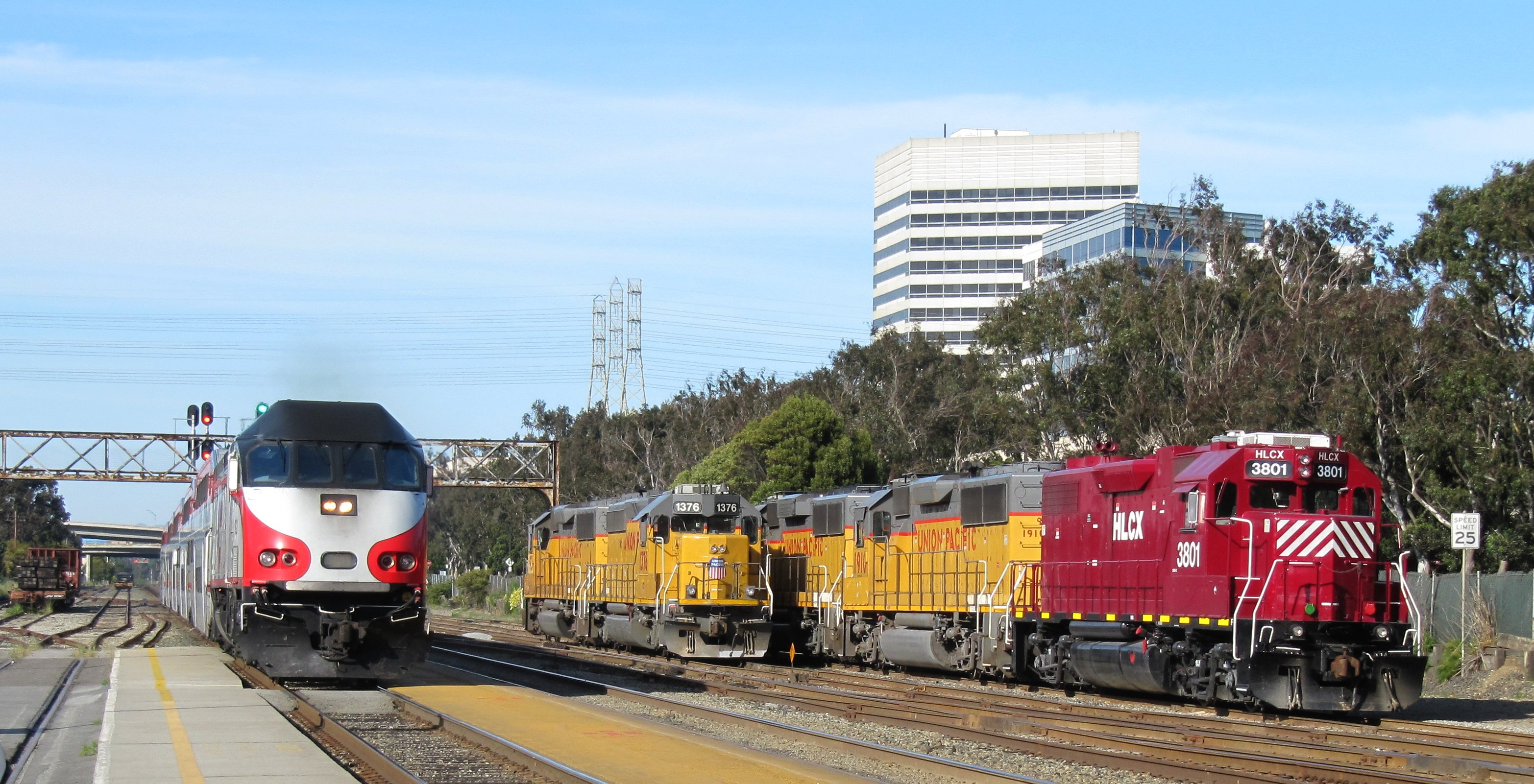
A Caltrain train (left) passes Union Pacific and Helm Leasing Company engines at South San Francisco, April 2014

Union Pacific freight trains run on the route, although the Fresno Subdivision through the San Joaquin Valley is the preferred north–south California route due to having easier grades and curves. The freight trains are typically local freights, empty bare-table and autorack trains. The line sees varying freight activity across its length. As of 2003, the line between Niles and San Jose saw four freight trains per day, the segment between San Jose and Watsonville saw 13 freight trains per day, between Watsonville and San Luis Obispo saw 7, San Luis Obispo to Santa Barbara saw 9, and 16 south of Santa Barbara to Los Angeles. Freight trains were serving San Francisco via Caltrain tracks and Union Pacific's spur between Oakdale Avenue and Cargo Way as of 2007.

=== Passenger ===
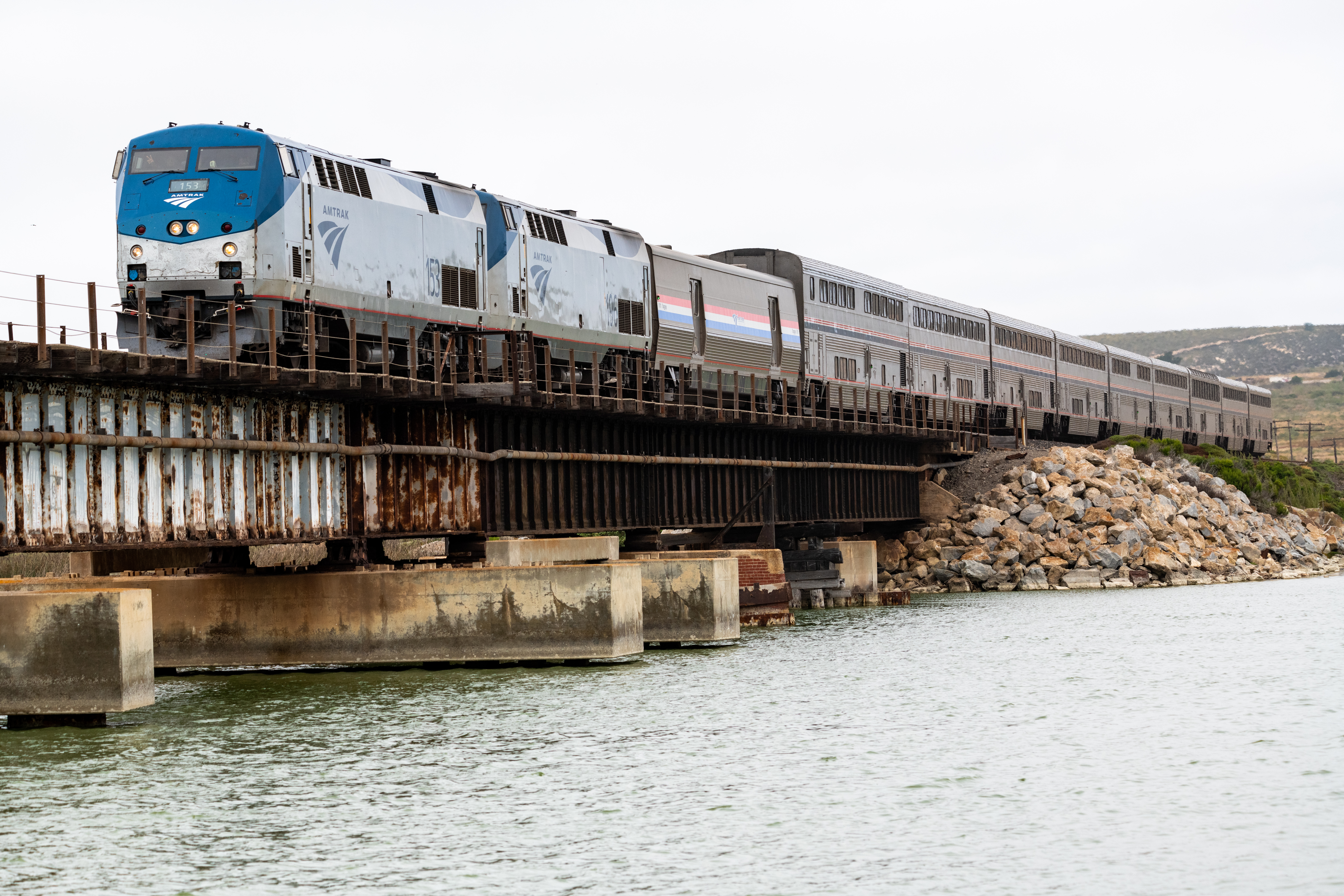
Coast Starlight crossing the Santa Ynez River, July 2019

The Coast Line is used by commuter, regional, and inter-city passenger trains:

- Amtrak California
  - Pacific Surfliner (San Luis Obispo–San Diego)
  - Capitol Corridor (Auburn–San Jose)
- Amtrak Coast Starlight (Los Angeles–Seattle)
- Metrolink Ventura County Line (Ventura–Los Angeles)
- Caltrain (San Francisco–Gilroy)
- Altamont Corridor Express (San Jose–Stockton)

The southern part of the Coast Line is the northern portion of the 351-mile-long (565 km) LOSSAN Rail Corridor between San Luis Obispo and San Diego. Local agencies along with the host railroads formed the Los Angeles–San Diego-San Luis Obispo Rail Corridor Agency (LOSSAN) in 1989 to work together on upgrading the route. Millions in enhancements to improve the reliability and safety of the railroad corridor have been proposed by Caltrans and federal railroad officials. Ventura County would get rail curve realignments near Seacliff, the Santa Clara River and Montalvo in the near term for an estimated $300 million. Future rail service could include a Ventura–Santa Barbara commuter train. Long-range plans also including commuter service between Ventura and Santa Clarita along the original route through the Santa Clara River Valley. The Ventura County Transportation Commission purchased the Santa Paula Branch Line within Ventura County from Southern Pacific. While a portion of the line was abandoned after being washed out in Los Angeles County, the Great Park development will provide for a route through the community of Valencia.

== See also ==
- Surf Line, the continuation south to San Diego
- Sunset Route, the continuation east to New Orleans
- Cal-P Line, the continuation north to Sacramento
- History of rail transportation in California
- Monterey County Rail Extension
- South Pacific Coast Railroad
