= Henry F. Grady =

American economist, businessman and diplomat (1882-1957)

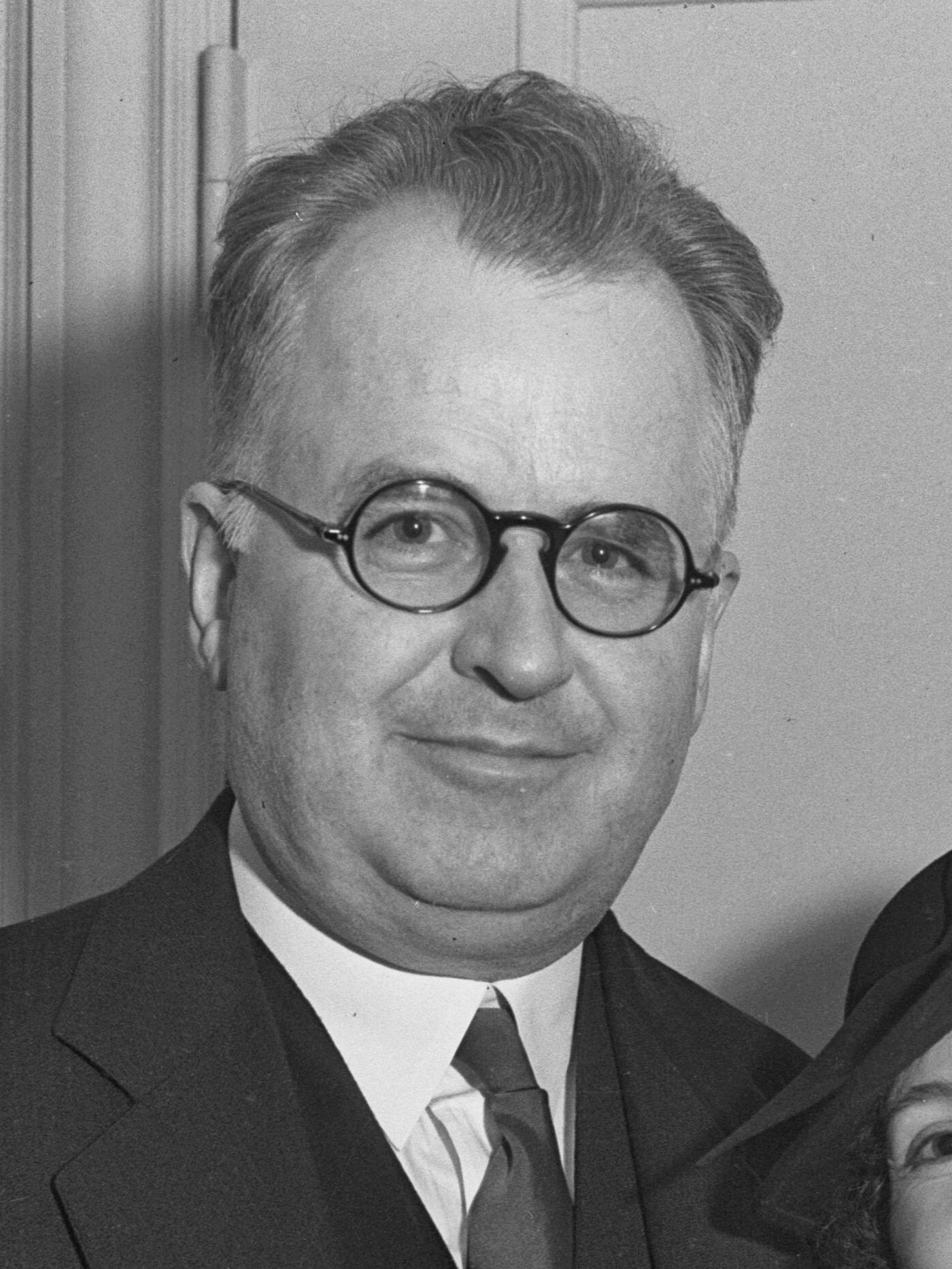
Grady in 1935

Henry Francis Grady (February 12, 1882 – September 14, 1957) was an American economist, businessman and diplomat. He was a dean at the University of California (1928–1937), and a business executive (1941–1947). He became the first U.S. Ambassador to India (1947–1948), followed by Ambassador to Greece (1948–1950), and Ambassador to Iran (1950–1951). He was against British colonialism in India and Iran. He worked with British diplomats in 1946 to devise a plan for continued British control of Palestine, but the Morrison–Grady Plan was rejected by both Arabs and Jews.

== Family ==
Grady (bottom right) and his father John H. Grady (bottom left) in a San Francisco Chronicle article about the Native Sons of the Golden West, September 9, 1900

Born in San Francisco, to John Henry and Ellen Genevieve (Rourke) Grady, took a BA degree at St. Mary's University in Baltimore in 1907, and a PhD in economics from Columbia University in 1927. On October 18, 1917, he married Lucretia Louise del Valle (daughter of California State Senator Reginaldo Francisco del Valle and Helen M. (White) del Valle, and granddaughter of Ygnacio del Valle). Grady's daughter, Patricia Louise Grady, was born in Paris, France, May 11, 1920, and died May 28, 2000, in Asheville, Buncombe, North Carolina. On August 24, 1942, she married diplomat John Paton Davies, Jr.

== Early career ==
Grady worked at the US Commerce Department in economics as an aide to Secretary Herbert Hoover in 1921. He was the dean, College of Commerce at the UC Berkeley from 1928 to 1934. He then moved to Washington as a prominent economist in the New Deal of President Franklin D. Roosevelt, rising to assistant secretary of state in 1939. He was a leading specialist in trade policy. His career was aided by his wife's major role as vice chairman of the Democratic National Committee. He left his government job to became president of the shipping company American President Lines (1941 to 1947). He helped solve wartime logistics issues, and became an advisor to Roosevelt on India and Italy.

== Diplomatic career ==
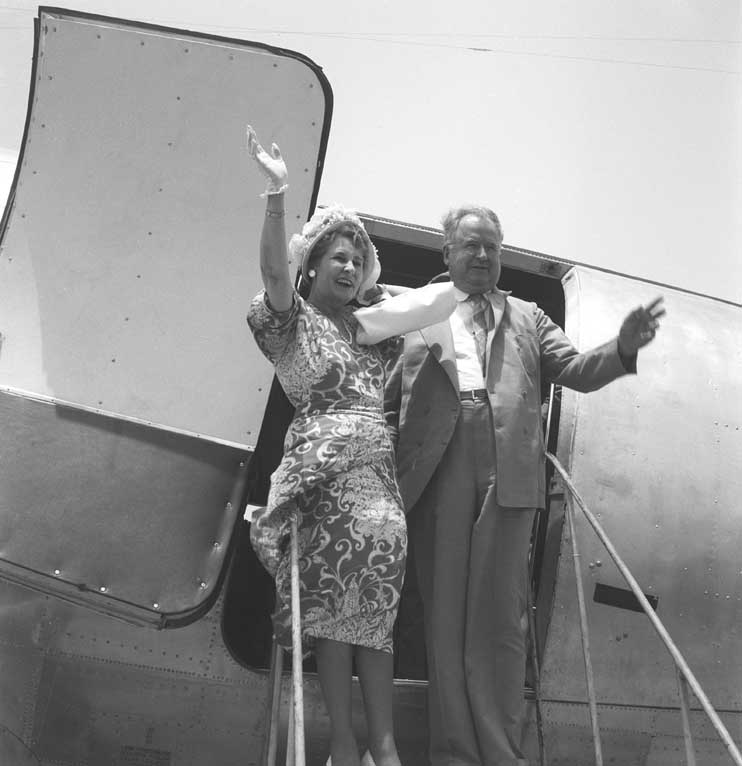
Henry F. Grady, U.S. Ambassador-designate to India, and his wife on their arrival at Willingdon aerodrome, New Delhi, on June 25, 1949.

In October 1945, he was appointed by US President Harry S. Truman as his personal representative to the Allied commission supervising elections in Greece because of the volatile situation created by the Greek Civil War.

In July 1946, Grady, together with British Deputy Prime Minister Herbert Morrison, proposed the "Morrison-Grady Plan," a proposal for the solution of the Palestine problem that called for federalization under overall British trusteeship. Ultimately, the plan was rejected by both Arabs and Jews.

Grady was the first US Ambassador to India, serving from 1947 to 1948 (concurrently first U.S. Minister to Nepal 1948). He was then appointed as US Ambassador to Greece from 1948 to 1950, and US Ambassador to Iran 1950–1951. He sharply disagreed with Secretary of State Dean Acheson regarding American support of British domination of Iran, and was fired as ambassador.

He was a member of the Pacific-Union Club in San Francisco, and of the Family Club.

== Death ==
He died September 14, 1957, on board the SS President Wilson, Pacific Ocean, from heart failure and was buried in Holy Cross Cemetery, Colma, California.

Diplomatic posts
Preceded by None	United States Ambassador to India; 1947 – 1948	Succeeded by Loy W. Henderson
Preceded by Lincoln MacVeagh	United States Ambassador to Greece; 1948 – 1950	Succeeded by John Emil Peurifoy
Preceded by John C. Wiley	United States Ambassador to Iran; 1950 – 1951	Succeeded by Loy W. Henderson
