= Senator del Valle =

Senator del Valle may refer to:

- Miguel del Valle (born 1951), Illinois State Senate
- Reginaldo Francisco del Valle (1854–1938), California State Senate
