= Lucretia del Valle Grady =

American politician (1892–1972)

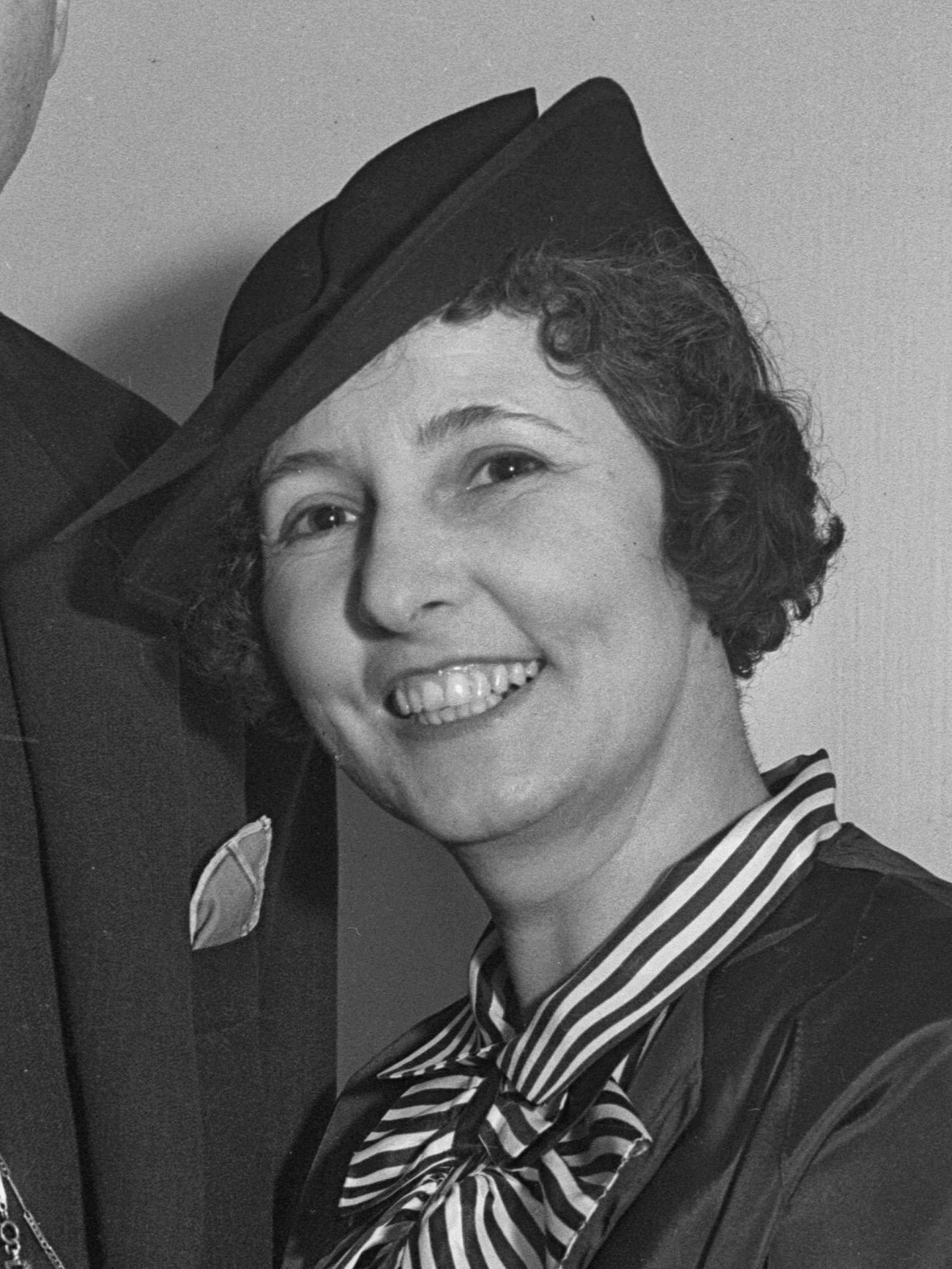
- del Valle in 1935
- Born: 18 October 1892; Los Angeles, California, U.S.
- Died: 23 May 1972 (aged 79); San Mateo, California, U.S.
- Occupations: Suffragette, activist
- Spouse: Henry F. Grady
- Parents: Reginaldo Francisco del Valle (father); Helen M. White (mother)

Lucretia del Valle Grady (October 18, 1892 — May 23, 1972) was a Californio political activist, suffragette, and actress. Born to Reginaldo Francisco del Valle, noted Angelino statesman, Lucretia became an important Democratic Party official, serving as vice chair of the Democratic National Committee and as delegate for California to the Democratic National Conventions of 1928, 1936, 1940, and 1956.

== Early life ==
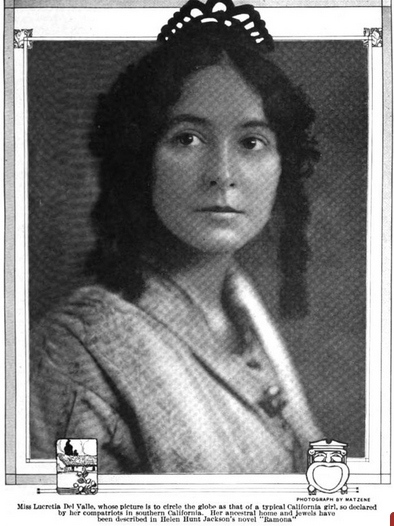
Lucretia del Valle from a 1914 publication.

Lucretia Louise del Valle was born in Los Angeles, California, the daughter of Reginaldo Francisco del Valle and Helen May White del Valle. Her father, a California state senator, owned Rancho Camulos. Her grandparents Ygnacio del Valle and Ysabel del Valle owned much of the Santa Clarita Valley.

== Career ==
Beginning in 1912, Lucretia del Valle starred as Doña Josefa Yorba in about 850 shows of a popular outdoor pageant at Mission San Gabriel, The Mission Play. A large painting of del Valle in this role, Guy Rose's The Leading Lady (1914), hangs at the San Diego History Center, in Balboa Park. Also in 1912, she appeared in The Landslide, a contemporary drama by Austin Adams, which ran in Los Angeles.

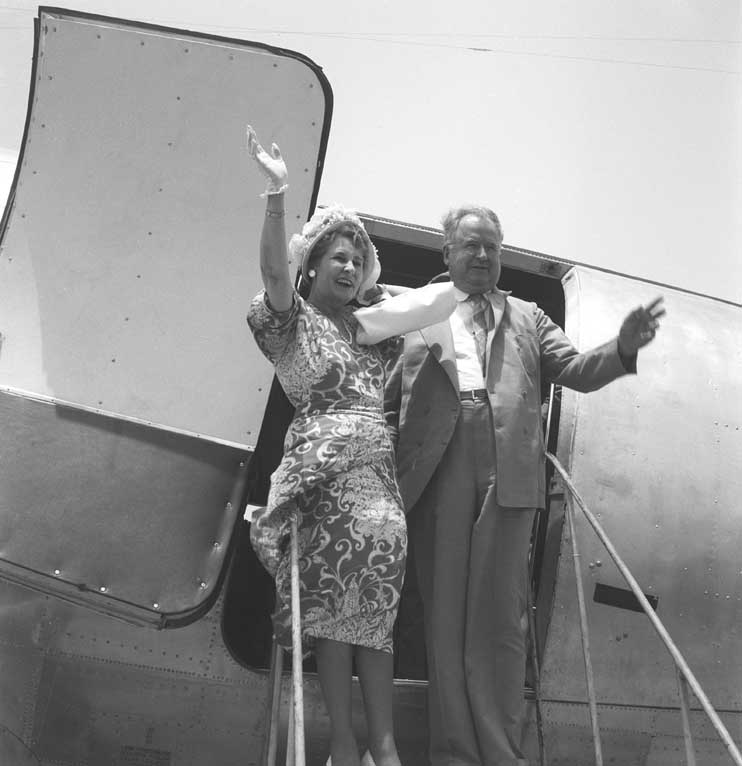
Lucretia del Valle and her husband Ambassador Henry F. Grady, 1949.

Del Valle left acting for political work, first with her father, and then with her husband, but also in her own right. Lucretia del Valle Grady was a California delegate to the Democratic National Conventions of 1928, 1936, 1940, and 1956. She was vice chair of the Democratic National Committee in 1937, when her husband Henry Grady became assistant Secretary of State, and the couple moved to Washington D. C.

In 1946, she christened the S. S. President Cleveland, a large passenger liner. She was active as a diplomat's wife when Henry Grady became the first United States Ambassador to the newly independent India in 1947. Henry Grady was ambassador to Greece in 1948, where Lucretia became the first woman named an honorary citizen of Athens; and in 1950 the couple were in Iran, where Lucretia Grady promoted women's rights, including suffrage.

== Personal life and legacy ==
Lucretia del Valle married economist and shipping magnate Henry Francis Grady in 1917. They had four children; their daughter Patricia Louise Grady married diplomat John Paton Davies, Jr. Lucretia Grady was widowed in 1957, and died in 1972, aged 79 years, in San Mateo, California, from a heart attack.

Del Valle Avenue in Glendale, California is named for Lucretia del Valle Grady. Some of her papers and photographs are in the Forster-del Valle Family Papers, at the University of California Irvine.
