= Ysabel del Valle =

California ranch owner (1837–1905)

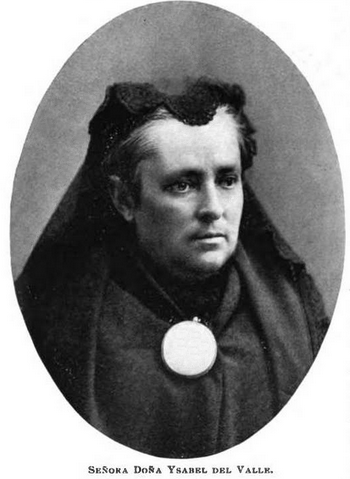
Ysabel del Valle in her later years, from a 1903 publication.

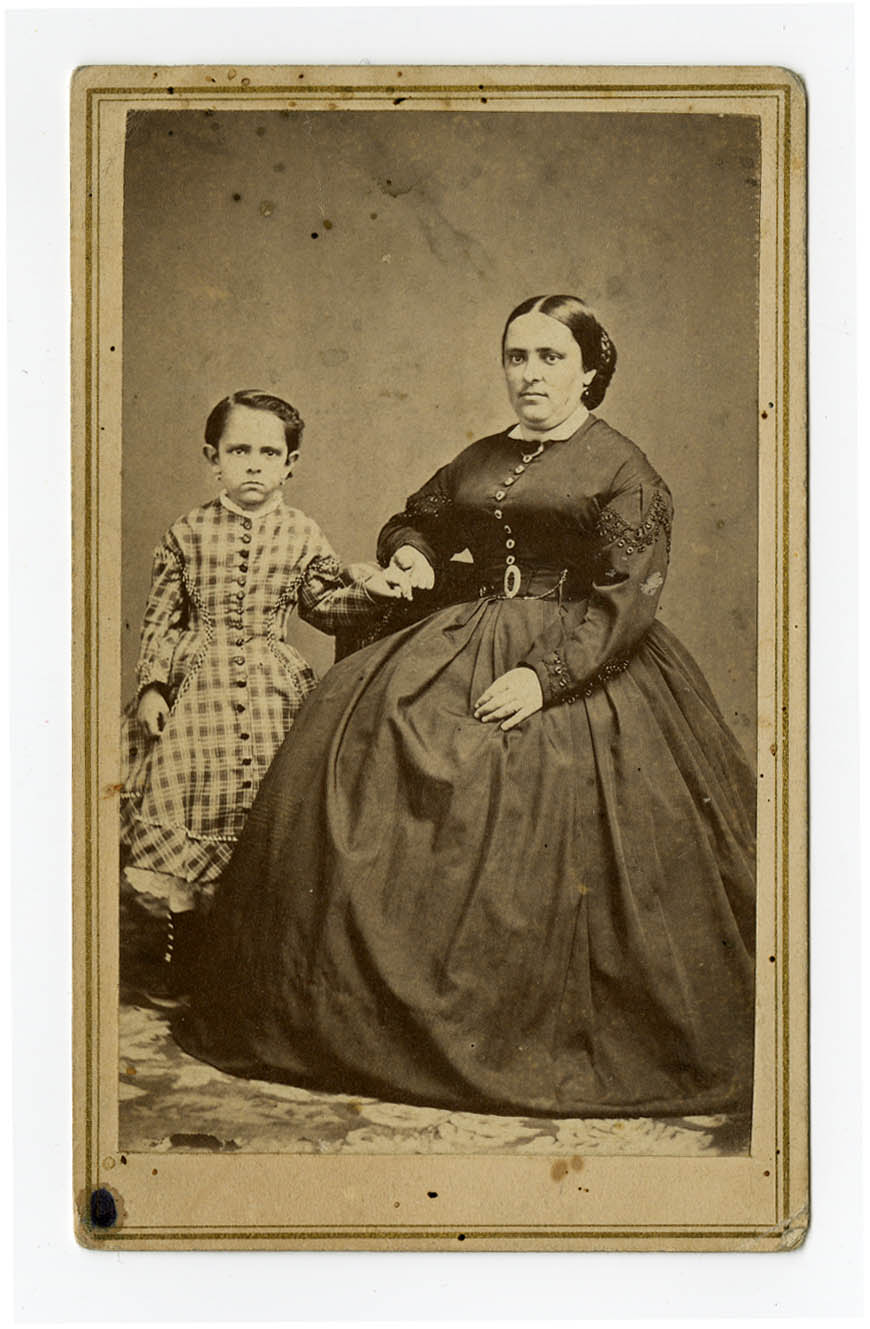
(Ysabel del Valle with child) (12911447415)

María Eufemia Ysabel Varela del Valle (March 21, 1837 – March 28, 1905), more commonly known as Ysabel del Valle, was a Californio philanthropist, ranchera and the matriarch of a prominent Valle family. She was the inspiration for the rancho matron character "Señora Moreno" in Helen Hunt Jackson's novel Ramona (1884).

== Early life ==
María Eufemia Ysabel Varela was born in Los Angeles, California, Mexico, the daughter of Cerval Varela and Ascencion A. de Varela.

== Marriage and charity work ==
Ysabel Varela became the second wife of alcalde Ygnacio del Valle in 1851 when she was 15 years old and he was 44. She was known to care for homeless children in Los Angeles, seeing to their food and health needs. She provided quarters for the Daughters of Charity religious order, raised money for them, and donated almond trees for their orphanage. She built and maintained a Roman Catholic chapel on the del Valles' Rancho Camulos in the Santa Clarita Valley; the chapel was called "the Lost Mission" because it became a stop for mission tourists and traveling priests.

Ygnacio died in 1880; Ysabel ran the rancho for twenty years as a widow, with help from three of her children. Her mother lived with her at Rancho Camulos, until 1899. Ysabel del Valle was a known model for the rancho matron character "Señora Moreno" in the popular 1884 novel Ramona by Helen Hunt Jackson; the author visited Rancho Camulos in her research for the book.

== Death and legacy ==
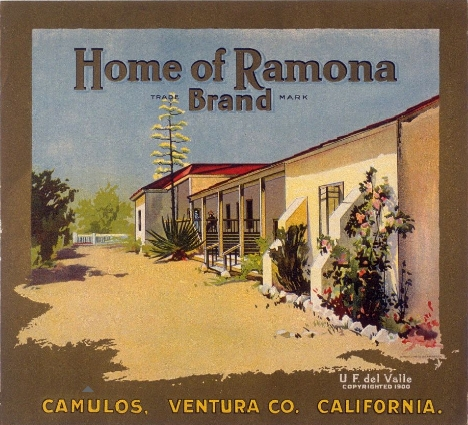
"Home of Ramona brand" label for Rancho Camulos products

Ysabel del Valle died in 1905, aged 68 years, at her daughter's home in Los Angeles. Her gravesite is in Calvary Cemetery in Los Angeles. One of her sons, Reginaldo Francisco del Valle, became a California state senator. One of her granddaughters, Lucretia del Valle Grady, was a Democratic party official and a diplomat's wife.

The del Valle Family Papers were donated to the Natural History Museum of Los Angeles County by Josefa del Valle Forster, Ysabel's daughter. There are photographs of her and her children in the Reginaldo del Valle Papers at the California Historical Society. A photograph album of the del Valle family at Rancho Camulos, assembled by Charles Fletcher Lummis, is in the collection of the Huntington Library. Other items of the family's history are in the Rancho Camulos Museum in Piru, California.

A 2016 exhibit at the library of Loyola Marymount University focused Ysabel del Valle's religious devotion, including objects from the chapel at Rancho Camulos. Her story was one of eleven biographies included in "History Keepers", a 2017 California Historical Society exhibit at El Tranquilo Gallery on Olvera Street in Los Angeles.
