= Rancho Camulos =

Historic ranch near Santa Paula, California

- U.S. National Register of Historic Places
- U.S. National Historic Landmark
- California Historical Landmark
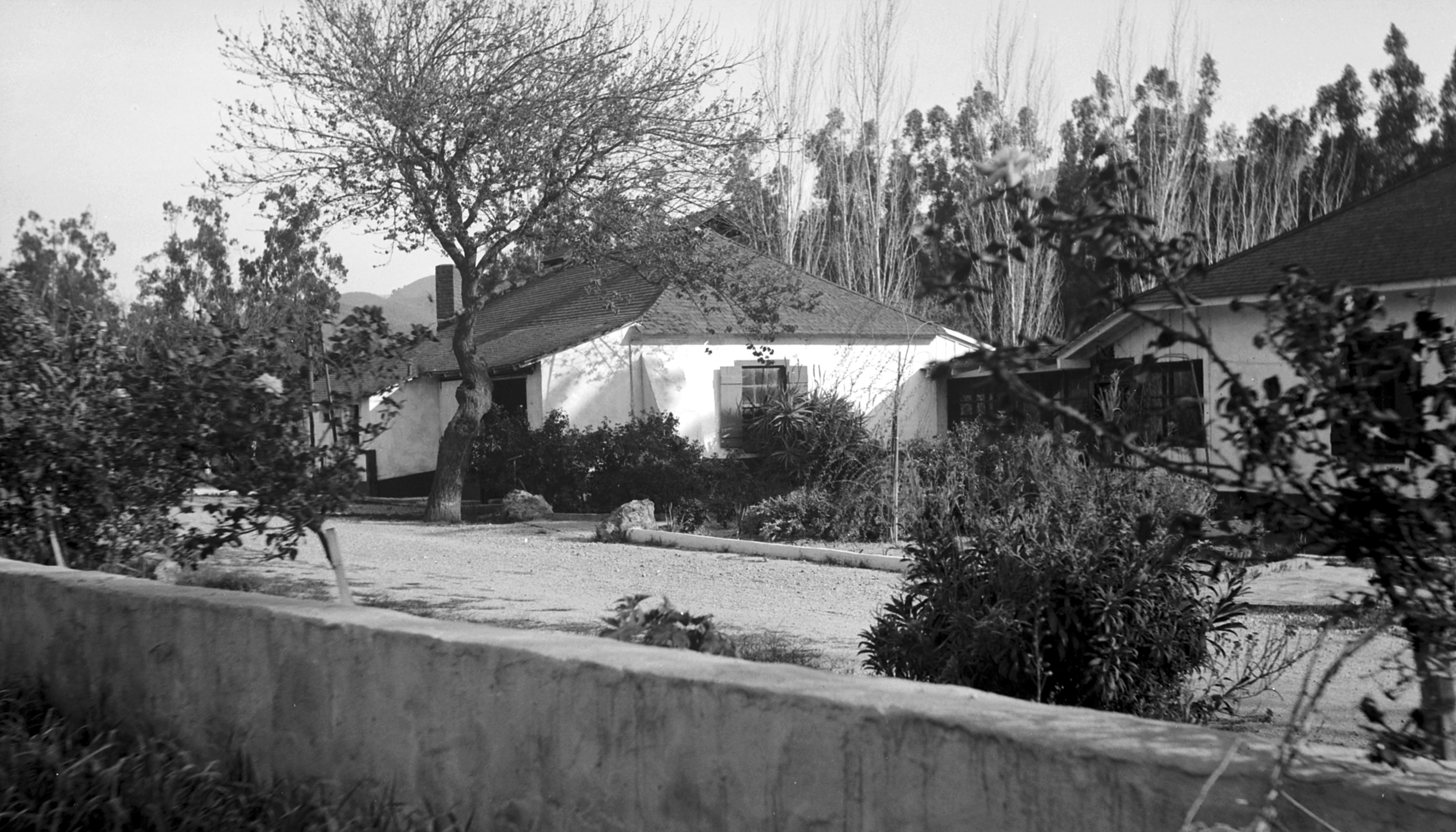
- A view of Rancho Camulos from the northwest.

- Location within California Location within the United States
- Interactive map showing the location of Rancho Camulos
- Location: 5164 East Telegraph Road, Piru, California
- Coordinates: 34°24′24″N 118°45′24″W
- Built: 1853
- Architectural style: Spanish Colonial; Mission Revival; Spanish Colonial Revival
- NRHP reference No.: 96001137
- CHISL No.: 553

Significant dates
- Added to NRHP: November 1, 1996
- Designated NHL: February 16, 2000
- Designated CHISL: 1956

Rancho Camulos, now known as Rancho Camulos Museum, is a ranch located in the Santa Clara River Valley 2.2 miles (3.5 km) east of Piru, California, and just north of the Santa Clara River, in Ventura County, California. It was the home of Ygnacio del Valle, a Californio alcalde of the Pueblo de Los Angeles in the 19th century and later elected member of the California State Assembly. The ranch was known as the Home of Ramona because it was widely believed to have been the setting of the popular 1884 novel Ramona by Helen Hunt Jackson. The novel helped to raise awareness about the Californio lifestyle and romanticized "the mission and rancho era of California history."

The 1,800-acre (7 km^{2}) working ranch is a prime example of an early California rancho in its original rural setting. It was the source of the first commercially grown oranges in Ventura County. It is one of the few remaining citrus growers in Southern California.

State Route 126 bisects the property, with most of the main buildings located south of the highway, and a few buildings on the north. The main adobe is one of the few extant Spanish Colonial buildings left in the state. Most of the other buildings are done in Mission Revival or Spanish Colonial Revival styles, both of which are derivatives of the original.

Rancho Camulos is designated a National Historic Landmark, listed on the National Register of Historic Places, and has also been designated as a California Historical Landmark. Many of the buildings and grounds are open to the public as a museum of this period in California history.

== History ==
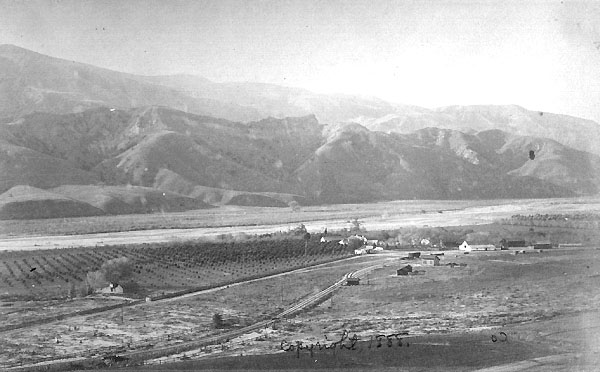
Aerial view of the rancho in the Santa Clara River Valley in 1888, with vineyards on the left and the Santa Clara River in the background.

In 1769, the Spanish Portola expedition, the first Europeans known to see inland areas of California, traveled downriver by boat and camped by the Santa Clara River on August 10. Their exact location is unknown but this area was later included in the territory of Rancho Camulos. Fray Juan Crespi, a Franciscan missionary traveling with the expedition, named the valley Cañada de Santa Clara.

The indigenous Tataviam people had a village here named Kamulus (meaning "juniper".) The area was used as early as 1804 by Mission San Fernando Rey de España for growing crops and as a grazing area for livestock. The population of this relatively isolated area (only traversed by the El Camino Real), as recorded by William Edward Petty Hartnell during his inspection of the mission in 1839, was 416. It was included in the 48,612-acre (197 km^{2}) Rancho San Francisco granted to Del Valle's father, Antonio del Valle, administrator of Mission San Fernando, by Governor Juan B. Alvarado on January 22, 1839, after the secularization of the missions.

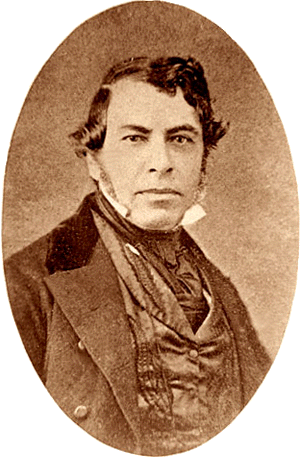
Ygnacio del Valle

After Antonio's death in 1841, his son Ygnacio inherited Rancho San Francisco. This action was challenged in court by his father's second wife. Nevertheless, by 1853 Del Valle constructed a four-room adobe house and a corral at Camulos. By 1857, the land title dispute was settled. Ygnacio got the western portion and the remainder was split among Antonio's children and his second wife. Del Valle bought back some of the other portions from his family, as well as the neighboring Rancho Temescal to the north, and began livestock operations on the expanded area.

The younger Del Valle and his family did not live on the ranch initially, instead settling in a house on what is now Olvera Street in Los Angeles. The Del Valle family did not move back to Camulos, which he had expanded, until 1861. During this time, the ranch was overseen by José Antonio Salazar, Del Valle's majordomo. Although the rancho was associated with Ramona and Mexican California, the house was not constructed until after the United States acquired the territory and California was admitted as a state. The Del Valle family never lived there under Mexican rule.

In the 1860s, a drought forced Del Valle to sell off much of his land, but he retained Camulos and prospered there. By the time of his death in 1880, he had expanded the house to twenty rooms, and the compound had become a self-sustaining ranch, complete with a brick winery, chapel, barn and workers' housing. Records indicate that in 1870 the ranch was largest vintner in the area. A stagecoach line opened in 1874 and in 1887, Southern Pacific ran a rail line past the ranch, including a depot at Camulos, ending the ranch's isolation.

In 1908, the Del Valle Company was incorporated by Ygnacio's children, but by 1924, they had sold the property to August Rübel, a native of Zürich, Switzerland. Upon its sale, the Los Angeles Times lamented that:

An era in the history of California closed yesterday. The Del Valles of Camulos bade farewell to the homestead where they have lived in successive generations since Antonio del Valle. It was the passing of the old regime. They are said to be the last of the old Spanish families who held in unbroken succession to the ancestral acres. –Los Angeles Times, August 11, 1924

Rübel continued operating the ranch in the same manner as the Del Valles, employing many of same workers. He had served in the American Field Service during World War I and when World War II broke out, he volunteered for active duty again. He died while serving in Tunisia in 1943. After his death, his widow Mary married a man named Edwin Burger, who was not as interested in maintaining the rancho. After Mary's death in 1968, Burger closed the ranch entirely. The buildings and grounds were left untended for years. Rübel's heirs regained control of the property after the 1994 Northridge earthquake, which had damaged a number of buildings on the rancho.

The Rübel family restored commercial citrus production and set about repairing the earthquake damage. They successfully lobbied to have Camulos listed on the National Register of Historic Places in 1996. In 2000, it was further designated a National Historic Landmark. Although the main house was restored in 1996, funding was not available to restore the smaller buildings until 2006, with construction completed in spring 2007. The rancho is on State Route 126, but little is visible from the highway.

The driveway/parking lot and grounds immediate to the highway were used as a filming location for the 1970 science-fiction television movie The Love War.

=== Agricultural development ===
Del Valle acquired his first Valencia orange seedlings in 1857 from his friend William Wolfskill. The fruit from these trees was the first to be commercially grown in what is now Ventura County, although this was relatively small scale because the crops had to be taken by wagon to Los Angeles. A Southern Pacific line opened in 1876 seventeen miles (27 km) to the east in Saugus, providing a more convenient form of transport.

However, the primary agricultural product from Rancho Camulos was wine. Ninety acres (360,000 m²) of vineyards were planted in the 1860s and Camulos wines and brandies were known throughout Los Angeles and Santa Barbara. In 1870, records indicate Camulos was largest of the four vintners in the San Buenaventura Township of Santa Barbara County, with 45 tons (40,900 kg) of grapes grown, making 6,000 US gallons (23,000 L) of wine and 800 US gallons (3,000 L) of brandy. In addition to oranges and grapes, the ranch produced almonds, walnuts, apricots, wheat, corn and barley. Flower petals from roses grown at Camulos were shipped to Europe to make perfume.

Over the years, the vineyards were replaced by other fruits. Today, about 600 acres (2.4 km^{2}) are under cultivation, most of it oranges, but lemons, grapefruit, and avocados are grown too. This makes Camulos a rare instance of a surviving citrus operation. During the years 1920–45, the citrus industry underwent a period of great growth. In contrast to the natural desert-like conditions of the area, photographs of "citrus belts" were publicized that helped establish the image of Southern California for the nation as an idyllic farmland. After World War II, urban and suburban development displaced much of the Southern California citrus production, with the notable exception of the Santa Clara River Valley.

=== Ramona ===
Ramona, published in 1884, was based in part on experiences that Helen Hunt Jackson had had during her visit to Rancho Camulos in 1882. Jackson spent only two hours on the ranch and did not meet Ysabel del Valle, but she had a keen eye for details and used many of her observations in the novel. For example, the altar cloth in the rancho's chapel had a small tear in it which had been mended. In the novel, the character Margarita accidentally tears the altar cloth, and Ramona sews it back together. The book became extremely popular and inspired a great deal of tourism, which was stimulated by the improved access possible due to the opening of Southern Pacific railroad lines in Southern California.

With all of the interest generated by the book, a number of communities declared that they were the setting for the novel in order to cash in on the boom, most notably Rancho Guajome in San Diego County, which Jackson had also visited prior to writing her book. However, the location of the fictional Moreno Ranch, "midway in the valley [between lands] to the east and west, which had once belonged to the Missions of San Fernando and San Bonaventura [sic]" corresponds to the location of Rancho Camulos, and the physical description of some of the buildings on the fictional ranch accurately describe buildings at Camulos. On the other hand, relative to the other locations in the novel (Ramona's having been married in San Diego and Alessandro's family being from the Temecula area), Camulos seems too distant to be the real location. Jackson died in 1885, never having publicly disclosed what locations she drew from for the book. Historians today are unsure whether Moreno Ranch represented a historic site.

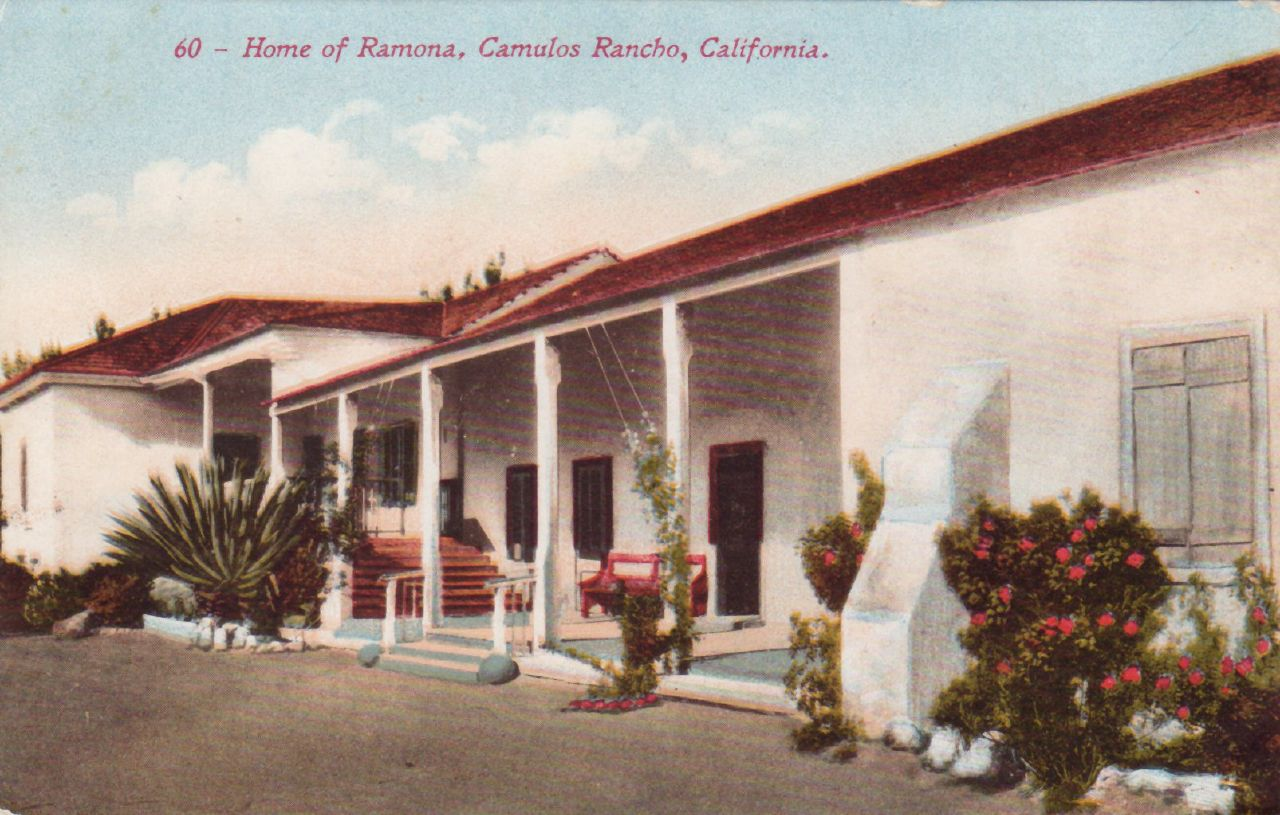
Postcard from 1906, where the rancho is called the "Home of Ramona"

Ramona (1910), a film with scenes shot in Camulos

By 1886, many readers and observers already considered Camulos to be the setting of the novel. Edward Roberts published an article entitled, "Ramona's Home: A Visit to the Camulos Ranch, and to the Scenes Described by 'H.H.'" in the May 13, 1886 edition of the San Francisco Chronicle. Significantly, he was one of the first to publish an account that blended fact and fiction. The inclusion of his article as an appendix to later versions of the novel only served to cement that association.

The first book solely devoted to Ramona and the ranch was published in 1888 by Charles Fletcher Lummis, a close friend of the Del Valles and an admirer of their daughter, the teenage Susana Carmen (nicknamed "Susanita") del Valle. Lummis took photographs of the buildings and published them in his own book, Home of Ramona: Photographs of Camulos, the Fine Old Spanish Estate Described by Mrs. Helen Hunt Jackson as the Home of "Ramona". He emphasized that the Del Valles were nothing like the fictional Morenos, who treated Ramona poorly, but he too would mix fact with fiction. For instance, he wrote, "[the veranda] is about a hundred feet in length and runs from the door of Father Salvierderra's room to that of Ramona's room."

Lummis's goal was to discourage the novel's association with other properties. For the same purpose, Adam Clark Vroman's Ramona Illustrated: The Genesis of the Story of Ramona compared photographs of the rancho's buildings and environs with text from the novel, as well as photographs from competing locations. By 1909, George Wharton James could confidently declare that Camulos was the "avowed and accepted home of the heroine".

Despite the lack of easy access to the ranch and any lodging in the area, tourists flocked to this site. The 1887 completion of the Southern Pacific line increased the number of visitors, as the railroad featured the ranch in its advertisements in order to distinguish the line from its competitors. Although the ranch was not developed for tourism, the Del Valles, with their Californio sense of hospitality, would lodge the visitors. By October 1888, housing visitors was getting to be so expensive for the family that Reginaldo del Valle pressed his mother to stop being so hospitable. The tourists could be quite a nuisance, and visitors would steal items from the house as souvenirs, or help themselves to fruit from the orchards.

The name Camulos became so tied to the novel that many people began to use it instead of the original "Moreno Ranch" when referring to the novel. An 1897 play based on the book was called, "Ramona, or the Bells of Camulos". In Virginia Calhoun's 1905 stage adaptation, characters in the play called the ranch Camulos as well.

D. W. Griffith shot portions of his 1910 silent film adaptation at the rancho, using the chapel, the adobe and patio, and the nearby mountains as backdrops. Paintings and photographs of the rancho by noted artists such as Adam Clark Vroman, Henry Sandham (who had accompanied Jackson on her initial tour), Henry Chapman Ford, and Alexander Harmer also illustrated later versions of the novel.

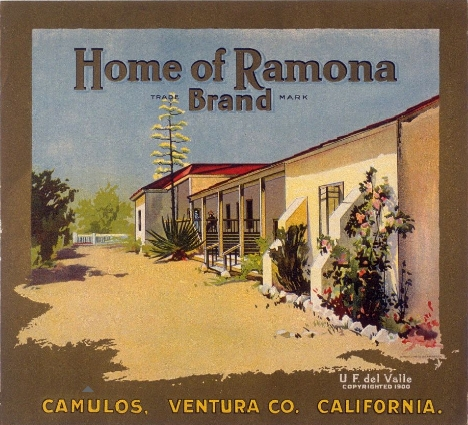
Home of Ramona branding label

Although tourism brought much difficulty to the Del Valles, they capitalized upon their newfound fame, branding their wine and oranges as the "Home of Ramona Brand". Their label used the same view of the veranda that had been popularized in postcards. One Tataviam servant girl was said to make quite a bit of money by pretending to be the "real Ramona" and charging tourists for a photograph.

Tourists continued to arrive even after the SP relocated its main line in 1903 through the Santa Susana Pass, bypassing Camulos. Two daily trains made stops at Camulos until the service was discontinued in the 1940s, with tourism by automobile having become the preferred method of travel. After the Rübels took ownership in 1924, they continued to welcome visitors in small numbers, converting the second floor of the winery into a small museum with artifacts from the Del Valle family. The rancho hosts an annual "Ramona Days" festival in October.

== Grounds ==
Map of the main buildings of Rancho Camulos (map not to scale)

Fifteen buildings are open to the public as part of the Rancho Camulos Museum, all of which were built before 1930 and are still in their original locations. They were built mostly in Spanish Colonial or Mission Revival styles (the latter is derived from the former). Later buildings were designed in differing architectural styles, more representative of their period of construction. Landscaping features, such as lawns, flower gardens, ornamental trees, and walkways, separate the residential areas from the working portions of the ranch.

The main adobe, also called the Ygnacio del Valle adobe, is a 10,000-square foot (929 m²), twenty-room, U-shaped structure. When initially constructed in 1853, it was an L-shaped four-room house connected with an external corredor (as opposed to an interior hallway), as is typical of the Spanish Colonial style. It is unusual for its time period because around this time, the Monterey style was in vogue, as is evidenced by contemporaneous buildings in Santa Barbara. Los Alamos Ranch House in Santa Barbara County, and Rancho Guajome Adobe and Las Flores Adobe in San Diego County, all National Historic Landmarks, are built in a similar style.

The house expanded in several phases. In 1861, before the Del Valle family moved here permanently, they added three additional rooms as well as a free-standing cocina (kitchen). This was to keep fire away from the main building, as well as to keep it cooler. A basement was dug out as the foundation of the new rooms. In the 1870s, another wing was added perpendicular to the 1861 addition. Finally, some time after 1895, one more room was added to the new wing, as well as a breezeway to the kitchen, completing the current shape. Remodeling completed after this time was to the interior only.

The basement of the house initially served as the wine storage area. In 1867, the family had a one-and-a-half-story brick winery constructed. After 1900, when wine grapes were no longer grown commercially, this building served as a storage room. Rübel later converted it to a museum for Ramona visitors, complete with Del Valle family artifacts. In the 21st century it is used for storage of farm equipment and automobiles.

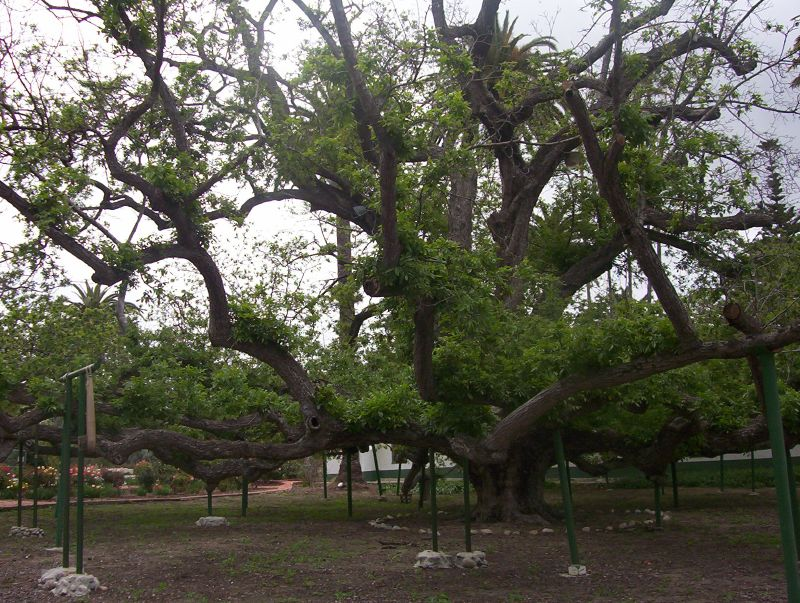
California Black Walnut (Juglans californica) tree, planted circa 1860s.

To the west of the main house is a large California Black Walnut (Juglans californica) tree that was most likely planted by Juventino del Valle in the 1860s. It measures 25 feet (7.6 m) in circumference and its branches spread out almost half an acre (2,000 m²). It is believed to be the largest Black Walnut tree in the area.

The wooden chapel was constructed around 1867, replacing a makeshift chapel that had been set up in 1861. After the secularization of the missions, this chapel became known as the "lost mission", the only place of worship between Mission San Fernando and Mission San Buenaventura. Directly to the northwest of the chapel is a bell structure. It originally contained three bells on a freestanding frame, which were used to call worshipers to Mass. The largest and a second, slightly smaller bell were cast at Kodiak, Alaska. The smaller one had previously been used at Mission San Fernando and may have been relocated to Camulos by Antonio del Valle when he was administrator at San Fernando. The third, and smallest bell, is missing.

The exact dates of construction of the barn, gas station, and bunkhouse are unknown, but the American Craftsman style of architecture indicates it was between 1910 and 1916, when this was popular. The barn is located to the northwest of the living quarters, in the main work area. The gas station and bunkhouse are not depicted on the map.

The small adobe, next to the highway, was built by Nachito del Valle. This Spanish Colonial Revival house was constructed around 1920. It was damaged severely in the 1994 earthquake. Since its reconstruction, it has served as the museum's visitor center.

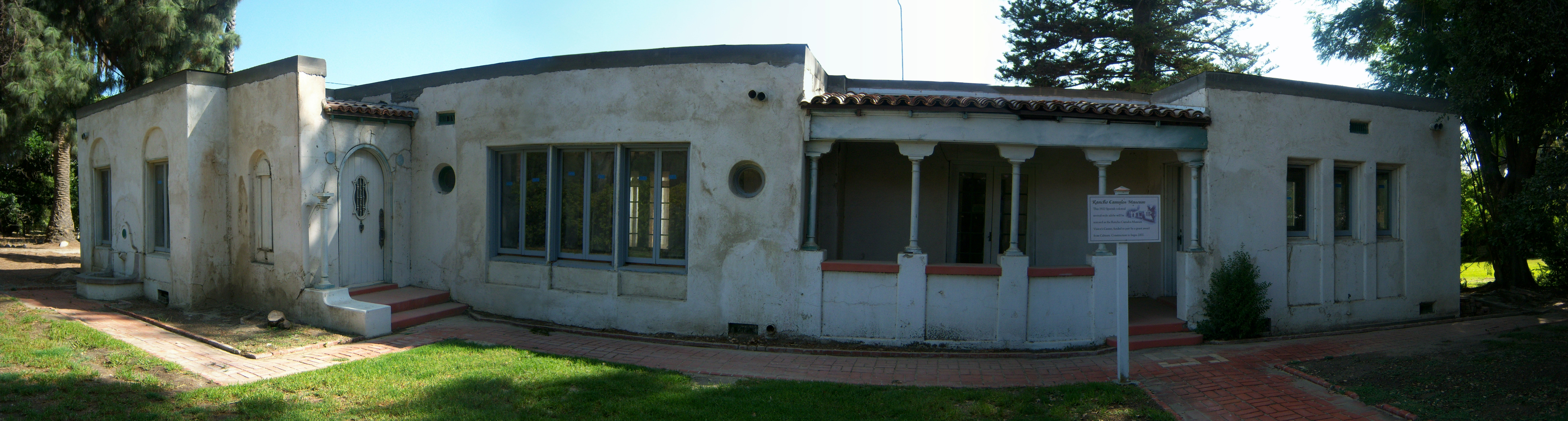
The ranch foreman’s house, an adobe that serves as the visitor center.

The schoolhouse, constructed in 1930, was the last structure to be built on the property. It was built by Rübel for his and his bookkeeper's families and designed to match the main adobe.

Few buildings are left on the north side of the highway. The most notable are the wooden Southern Pacific saltbox-style section house and workers' bunkhouse, both built in 1887. A train depot and post office both stood in this area, but have been torn down. (Note: Ventura County settlements with a Post Office in 1890 included Bardsdale, Camulos, Fillmore, Matilija, Montalvo, Newbury Park, New Jerusalem, Piru City, Punta Gorda, Simi, Springville, and Timberville. Larger Post Offices in Ventura, Hueneme, Santa Paula, Saticoy, and Nordoff provided money order service (Ventura also handled International exchange).) Three extant farmworkers' bungalows, built by the Del Valle family in 1916, are located west of the section house.

== Historic designations ==
- United States National Historic Landmark – added February 16, 2000
- United States National Register of Historic Places – reference number 96001137, added November 1, 1996
- California Historical Landmark – number 553

== See also ==
- List of Registered Historic Places in Ventura County, California
- Ventura County Historic Landmarks & Points of Interest
- List of ranchos of California
