= Rancho Temescal =

Mexican land grant in Los Angeles and Ventura Counties, California

Coordinates: 34.480°N 118.720°W

Rancho Temescal was a 13,339-acre (53.98 km^{2}) Mexican land grant in present-day Ventura County and Los Angeles County, California given in 1843 by Governor Manuel Micheltorena to Francisco Lopez and José Arellanes. The word “temescal” is Spanish for "sweat bath" or "sweat lodge", deriving from the Nahuatl “temazcalli”. The grant was located in the upper end of the Santa Clara Valley, in the eastern section of Ventura County, in the upper Santa Clara River Valley near the base of the Topatopa Mountains where Piru Creek and the Santa Clara River meet. The grant encompassed present-day Lake Piru and town of Piru.

== History ==
Francisco Lopez and José Arellanes were granted three square league Rancho Temescal in 1843. The grant was later transferred to Ramon de la Cuesta and Francisco Gonzales Ciminio.

With the cession of California to the United States following the Mexican-American War, the 1848 Treaty of Guadalupe Hidalgo provided that the land grants would be honored. As required by the Land Act of 1851, a claim for Rancho Temescal was filed with the Public Land Commission in 1853. The Land Commission rejected the claim on the grounds that the boundaries were vague, but the United States district court confirmed the grant. The US appealed the grant to the US Supreme Court, and the Supreme court upheld the grant in 1863., and the grant was patented to (R. de la Cuesta) in 1871.

Ygnacio del Valle (1808 –1880) of the adjacent Rancho San Francisco, acquired Rancho Temescal. In 1887, the sons of Ygnacio del Valle sold Rancho Temescal to David C. Cook from Elgin, Illinois, who had come west because of poor health. Cook, born in New York in 1850, was the owner of a publishing business. Cook founded the town of Piru on the rancho.

== See also ==
- Ranchos of California
- List of Ranchos of California
