= Reginaldo Francisco del Valle =

American politician

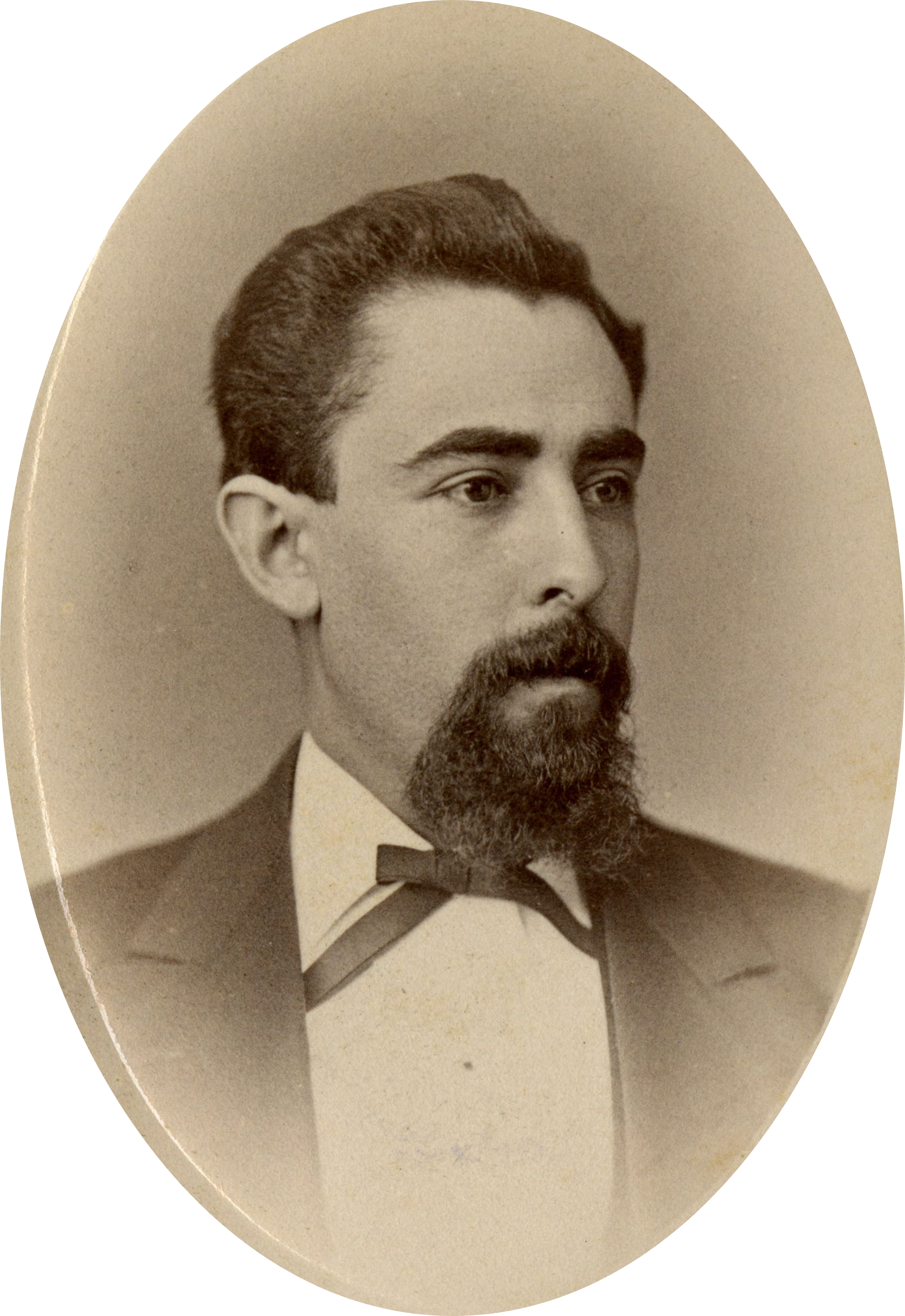
- del Valle c. 1878–1880

24th President pro tempore of the California State Senate
- In office April 1, 1882 – March 13, 1883
- Preceded by: William Johnson
- Succeeded by: Benjamin Knight

Member of the California Senate from the 2nd district
- In office January 8, 1883 – January 3, 1887
- Preceded by: John P. West
- Succeeded by: John M. Briceland

Member of the California State Assembly from the 2nd district
- In office January 5, 1880 – January 8, 1883
- Preceded by: Multi-member district
- Succeeded by: Multi-member district

Personal details
- Born: December 15, 1854 Los Angeles, California, U.S.
- Died: September 20, 1938 (aged 83) Los Angeles, California, U.S.
- Party: Democratic
- Spouse: Helen M. White (m. 1890)
- Children: Lucretia
- Parents: Ygnacio del Valle (father); Ysabel del Valle (mother)
- Education: Santa Clara University
- Profession: Lawyer, politician
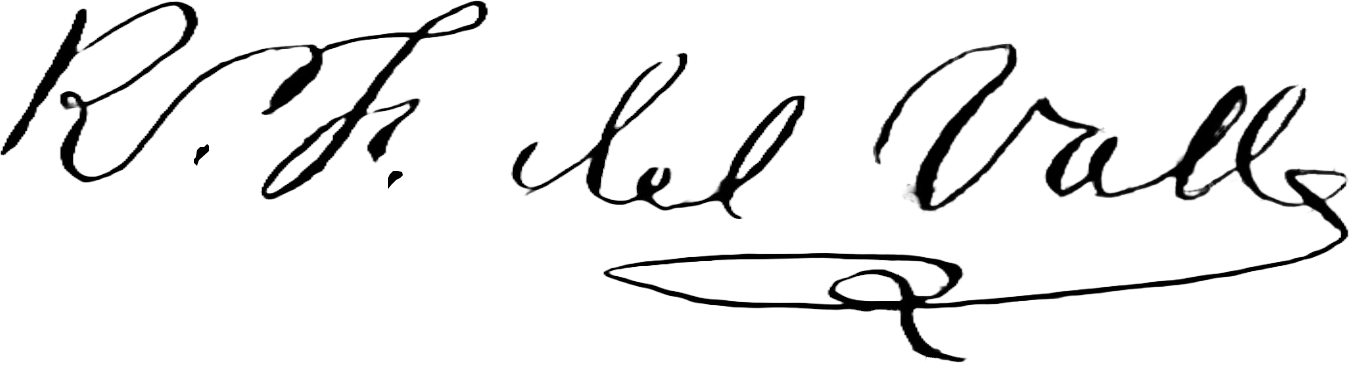
- Signature

Reginaldo Francisco del Valle (December 15, 1854 – September 20, 1938) was a Californio statesman, lawyer and politician who served as a member of the California State Assembly from 1880 to 1883, and the California State Senate from 1883 to 1887. He was the youngest ever President pro tempore of the California Senate and was instrumental in the foundation of the institution today known as the University of California, Los Angeles.

== Personal life ==
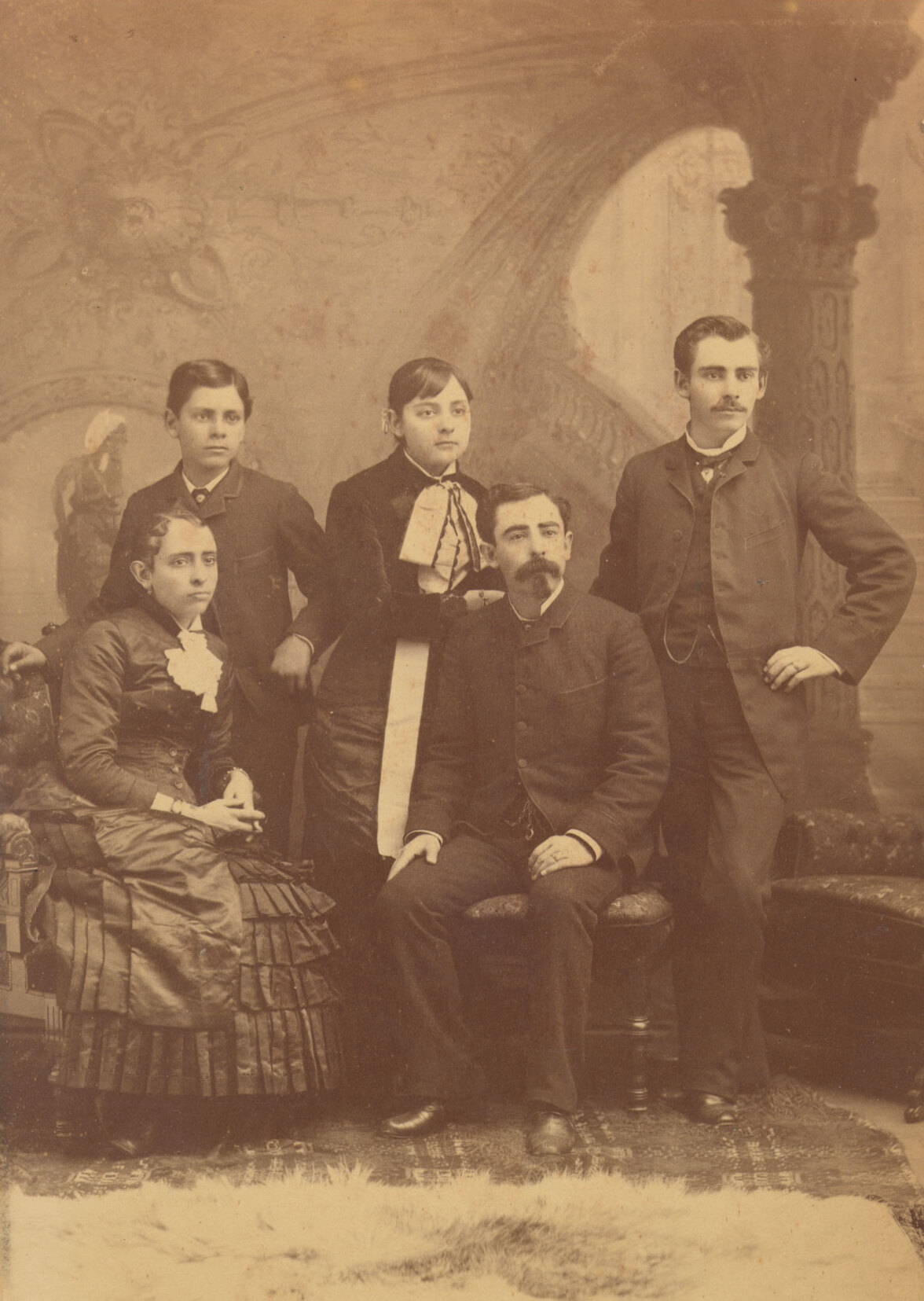
Reginaldo (seated, right) and his siblings c. 1884–1887

Del Valle was born on December 15, 1854, in an adobe house facing the Plaza in Los Angeles, the son of Ygnacio del Valle of Compostela, Jalisco, Mexico and Ysabel Varela, who was born in California. In 1861, the family moved to Rancho Camulos in today's Ventura and Los Angeles counties.

A 2006 study of del Valle headed by David E. Hayes-Bautista reported that: "Young Reginaldo was tutored at home, becoming fluent in English and French as well as Spanish." He went to St. Vincent's College in Los Angeles for high school (1867–71) and, after graduating with honors, attended Santa Clara University, where he graduated in 1873. He read law with the San Francisco firm of Winans and Belknap, and he passed the state bar examination in 1877. Del Valle's education reflected the cosmopolitan upbringing of California's post-Mexican elite, positioning him to bridge Californio heritage and emerging American political institutions in the decades following statehood.

Del Valle opened his law office at 38 Temple Block, just a few steps from the Plaza. He was noted as a "logical and concise speaker" in an accent "with just a suave hint of Castilian."

On September 2, 1890, in San Francisco, he married Helen M. Caystile, widowed six years previously from T. J. Caystile, co-owner of the Los Angeles Daily Times, and adopted the Caystiles' daughter, Helen. The new couple had another daughter, Lucretia del Valle, who married Henry F. Grady of San Francisco.

Del Valle was a member of the Los Angeles Athletic Club, La Junta Patriotica de Juárez, the Original Young Spanish Americans and the Club Cura Hidalgo.

He died on September 20, 1938, leaving daughter Lucretia Grady and a sister, Josefa del Valle Forster. Requiem mass was in the Old Plaza Church, and interment was in Calvary Cemetery, East Los Angeles.

== Political career ==
=== State Assembly ===
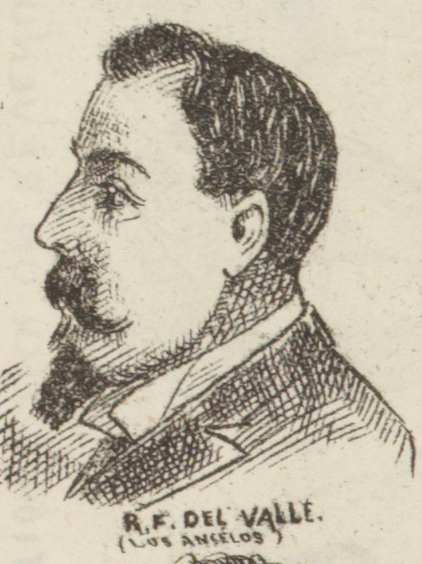
1880 Sketch by Carl Browne

A Democrat, del Valle was a California State Assemblyman from 1880 to 1883. In that position, he unsuccessfully opposed a bill that required all state offices to keep their records only in English, instead of in both Spanish and English moving forward.

While an Assemblyman, del Valle received a letter from former Governor John G. Downey, dated February 22, 1879, encouraging him to "push for a Los Angeles location" for a new state normal school, which would specialize in teacher training. Del Valle introduced such a bill within two weeks, but after months of wrangling, this and other bills submitted by other assemblymen on behalf of their counties were either defeated, withdrawn or killed.

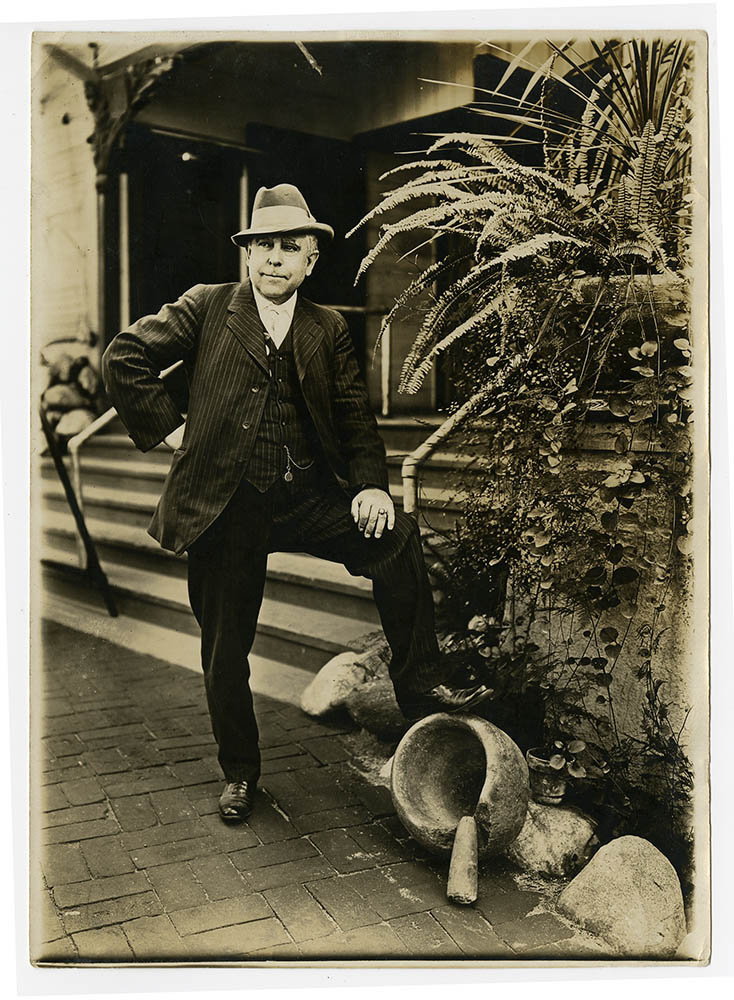
Portrait of del Valle.

In the 1881 Assembly session, del Valle was nominated for the speakership but lost by three votes. On January 4, 1881, he introduced another bill to establish a branch normal school in Los Angeles, and, after parliamentary maneuvering, a similar bill that had already passed the State Senate was adopted in the Assembly and signed into law by Governor George C. Perkins. As a result, according to a history of the Los Angeles State Normal School written twenty-five years later, "Mr. Del Valle became a target for the Workingman's Delegation of San Francisco, some members of which in the heat of the debate made use of sharp personalities."

This bill established a branch normal school in Los Angeles; it was considered to be a branch of the original State Normal School at San Jose and was governed by the board of trustees of that institution. In 1887, the branch school became a separate institution with its own board of trustees. In 1919, the Los Angeles State Normal School joined the University of California and evolved into the University of California, Los Angeles.

=== State Senate ===
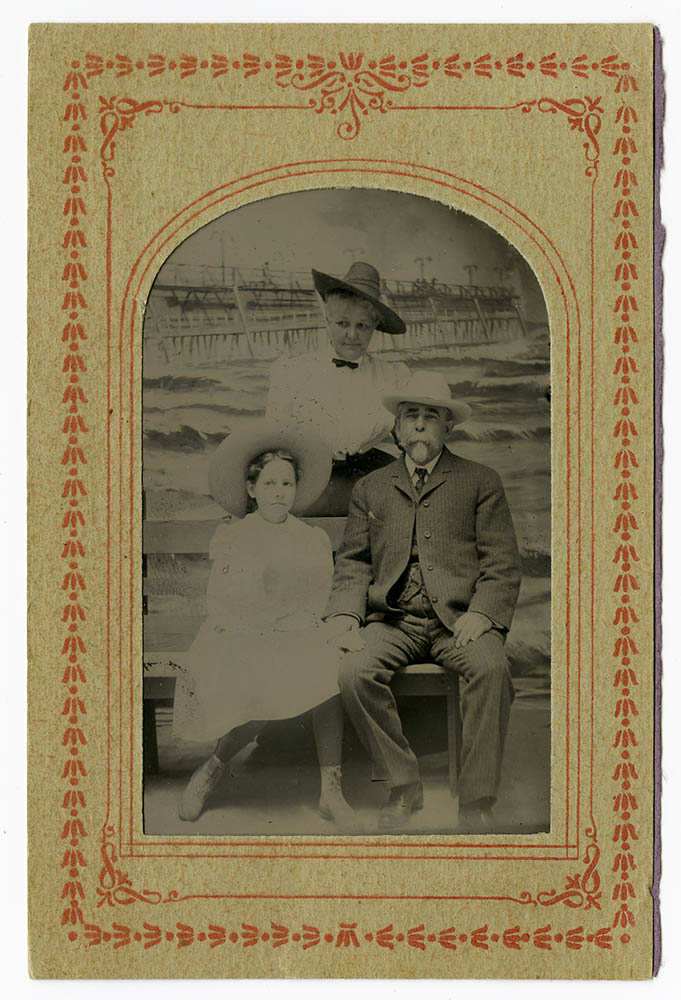
Reginaldo, his wife Helen, and their daughter Lucretia del Valle Grady.

Del Valle was elected to the California State Senate in 1882, serving from 1883 to 1887. In the latter year, the Los Angeles Times noted that del Valle:

is the parliamentarian par excellence in the upper House. Since his school days at Santa Clara College, he is generally accredited with having adopted Cushing's unabridged, so to say, as his Bible. ... He never hesitates for an instant, and is even a little arrogant in the promptness with which he decides every point and rushes the work along. No one ever thinks of appealing from his decisions.

As a senator, del Valle fought to establish the new Los Angeles institution as a school in its own right, with a separate board of trustees and separate governance from the statewide institution, which was headquartered in San Jose and dominated by Northern California members. Although he left the Senate in 1887, his proposal was eventually put into law, and del Valle was noted as the "intellectual author" of the legislation that authorized it.

=== Water rights ===
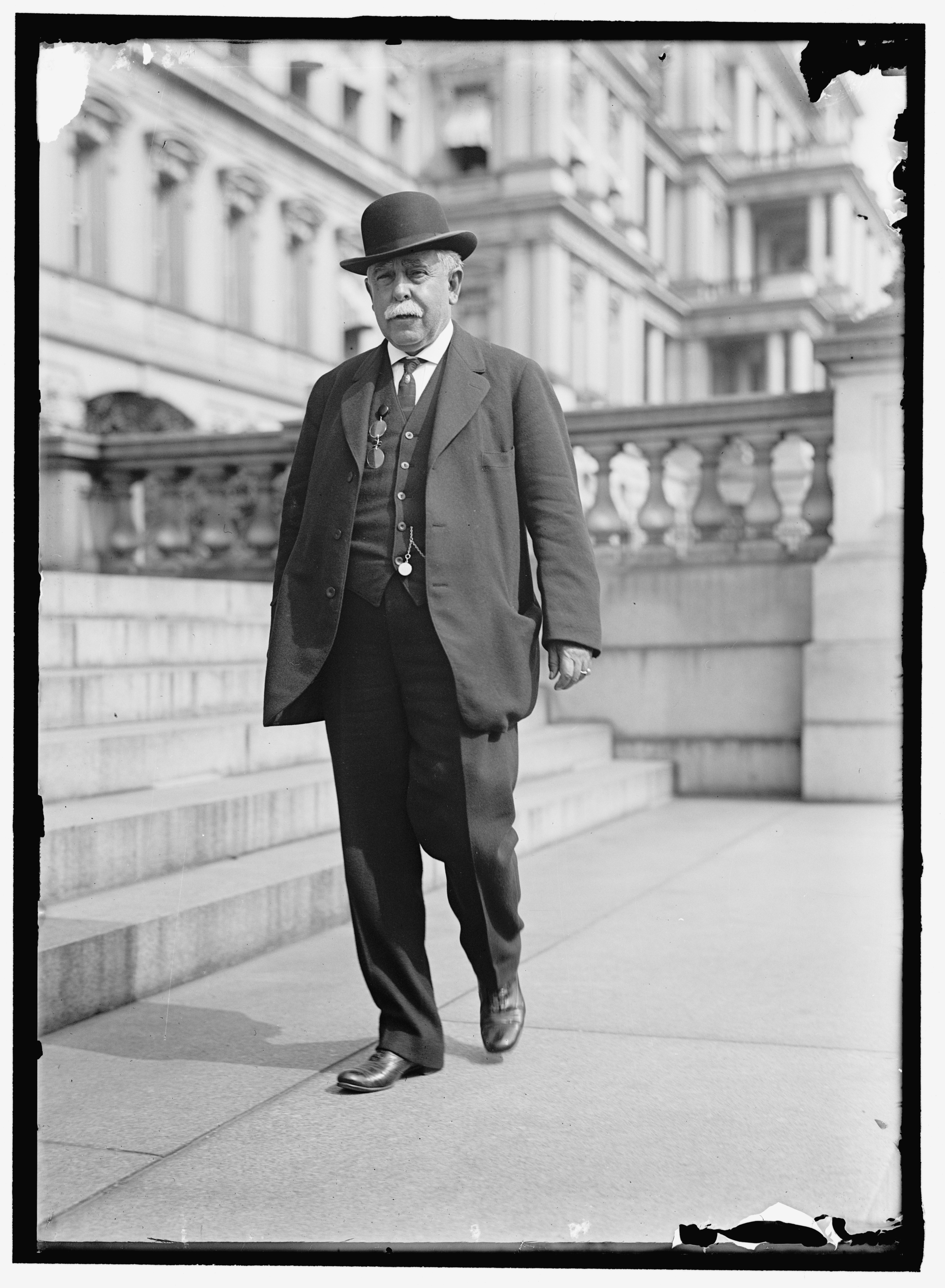
Del Valle c. 1910–15

Del Valle served on the city Public Services Commission for twenty-one years, beginning in 1908. He was the one who brokered peace in the "water wars" when irate ranchers dynamited the Los Angeles Aqueduct, which brought water to the city from the Owens River valley. "To him, as much as to anyone, Los Angeles owes the mighty aqueduct that was built to tap the water of the Sierra," the Los Angeles Times noted, and the Los Angeles Examiner said, "The city's present water system is a monument to his energetic leadership."

=== Later career ===
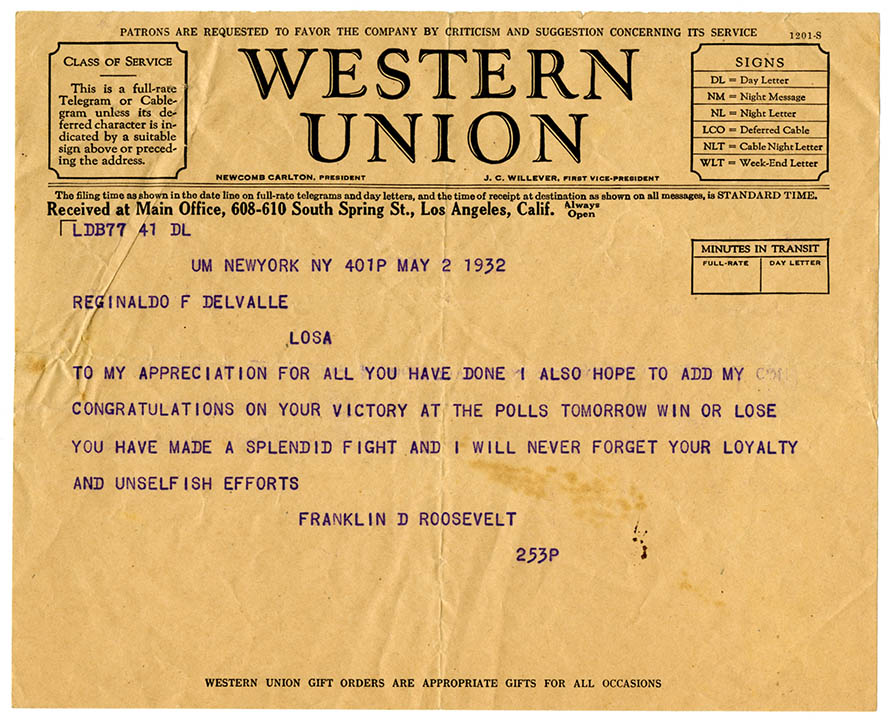
Telegram sent to del Valle by Franklin D. Roosevelt.

Del Valle ran unsuccessfully for Congress in 1884 and for Lieutenant Governor in 1890. He was admitted to practice before the U.S. Supreme Court in 1893, and he was chairman of the Democratic State Conventions in 1888 and 1894. He was a delegate to the 1900 Democratic National Convention in Kansas City, Missouri.

With his friend Charles Lummis, del Valle was a founding member of the Landmarks Club of Southern California, formed in 1887 to advocate for the restoration of the California missions. He also was "one of the forty founding members of the Southern California Historical Society and spearheaded the committee to restore the San Fernando Mission and the mark El Camino Real with bells."

In 1892 del Valle was a lecturer in parliamentary law in the newly opened Southern California College of Law, and later he "formed a number of law partnerships."
