= Piru, California =

Unincorporated community in Ventura County, California

- Unincorporated community Census-designated place
- Location in Ventura County and the state of California

- Location in the State of California Piru (the United States)
- Coordinates: 34°24′26″N 118°47′59″W
- Country: United States
- State: California
- County: Ventura
- Town established: 1887

Government
  - State senator: Monique Limón (D)
  - Assemblymember: Steve Bennett (D)
  - U. S. rep.: Julia Brownley (D)

Area
  - Total: 3.195 sq mi (8.275 km^{2})
  - Land: 3.179 sq mi (8.234 km^{2})
  - Water: 0.016 sq mi (0.041 km^{2}) 0.50%
- Elevation: 709 ft (216 m)

Population (2020)
  - Total: 2,587
  - Density: 813.7/sq mi (314.2/km^{2})
- Time zone: UTC-8 (Pacific)
  - Summer (DST): UTC-7 (PDT)
- ZIP code: 93040
- Area code: 805
- FIPS code: 06-57372
- GNIS feature IDs: 1652775, 2409077

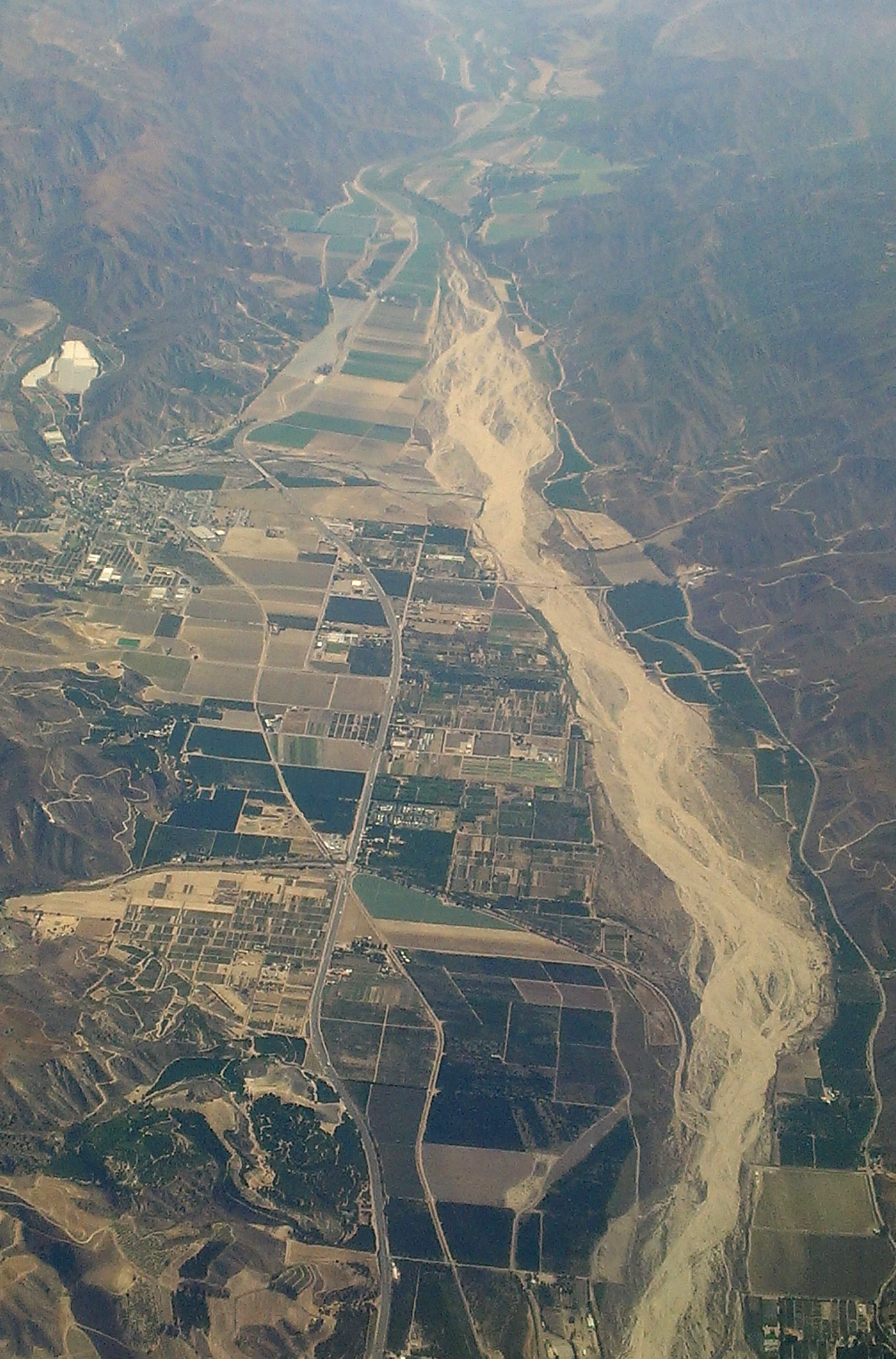
Piru (at center left) and the Santa Clara River valley

Piru (/ˈpaɪ.ruː/) is a small unincorporated historic town located in eastern Ventura County, California, United States, in the Santa Clara River Valley near the Santa Clara River and Highway 126, approximately seven miles (11 km) east of Fillmore and about 13 miles (21 km) west of Interstate 5. Lake Piru, in the Los Padres National Forest, is the main recreational attraction. The population was 2,587 at the 2020 census, up from 2,063 at the 2010 census. For statistical purposes, the United States Census Bureau has defined Piru as a census-designated place (CDP), which does not precisely correspond to the historical community.

== Etymology ==
Although the town is located in the traditional homelands of the Tataviam, the name Piru (originally pronounced "Pea-roo") derives from the Chumash word pí idhu-ku, which referred to the tule reeds growing along Piru Creek that were used in making baskets.

Also designated and delineated as "Piro", adjacent to "Piro Creek" on 19th century atlas maps, (i.e. A. L. Bancroft's 1876 map of California, Nevada, Arizona, and Utah) It was first named Piru City in 1888.

== History ==
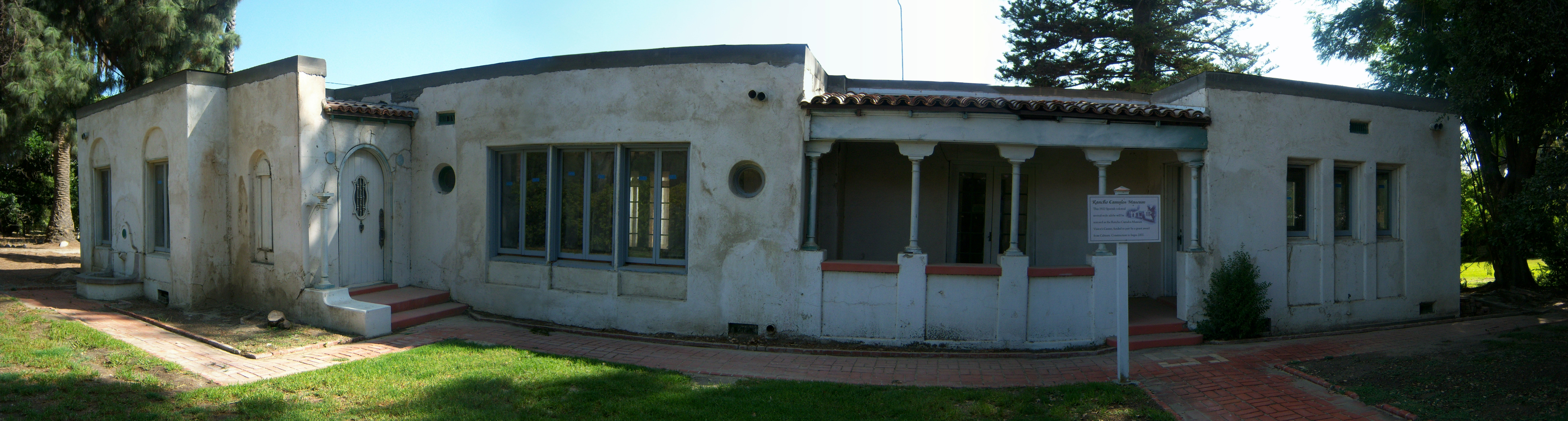
The Rancho Camulos ranch foreman's house in Piru, before its renovation as a visitor center.

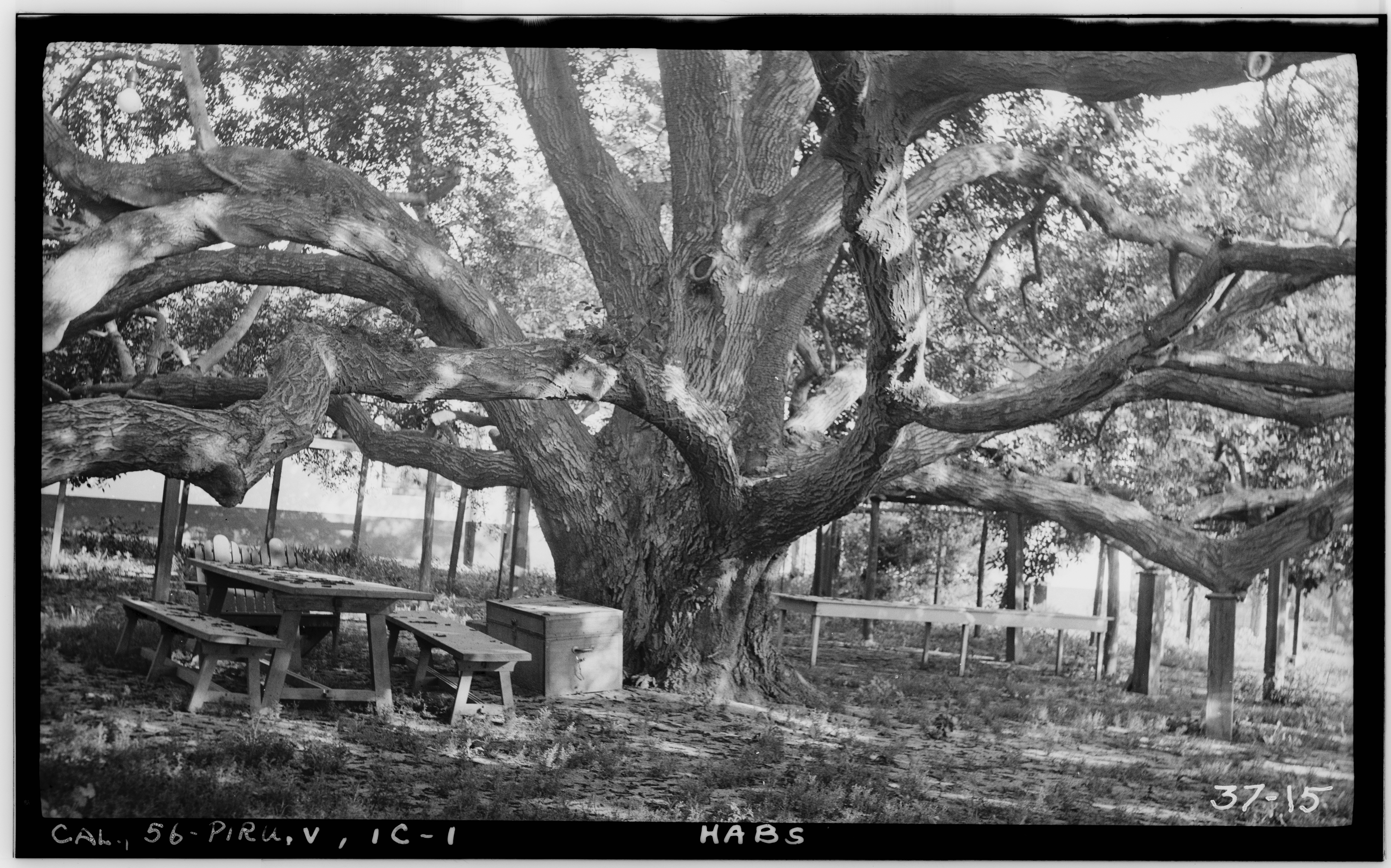
View of a very large black walnut tree on the historic Rancho Camulos, Piru, 1934

=== Indigenous ===
The area was originally inhabited by the Tataviam, who often established villages along near permanent water sources at lower elevations, including Piru Creek and the Santa Clara River. The Tataviam village of Piiru was the original village of the area. There was also a nearby shared village between the Tataviam and Chumash of Kamulus in the corridor.

Piru Creek was generally known as the place where the Chumash and Tataviam shared the land with one another, being on the respective edges of each of their lands. Important plant foods for the Tataviam included yucca stalks and hearts, acorns, sage seeds, juniper and holly leaf cherry berries. The yucca hearts were collected in the spring each year and roasted in earth ovens.

=== Rancho and settler town ===
The town was founded in 1887 by David C. Cook from Elgin, Illinois, a wealthy publisher of Sunday School tracts and supplies who bought the Rancho Temescal Mexican land grant from the sons of Ygnacio del Valle. Wanting to establish a "Second Garden of Eden" in this part of the Santa Clara River Valley, Cook specified, tradition says, that the acreage be planted with fruits identified with the Biblical garden—apricots, dates, figs, grapes, olives and pomegranates. That same year, he built his first home, a Colonial Revival structure, at the southwest corner of Main and Center Streets.

The coast rail line was built through the valley in 1887. Because a small depot was already going to be built in nearby Camulos, Charles Crocker of Southern Pacific Railroad refused to build a depot in Piru. This so annoyed Cook that he built his own depot and hired a stationmaster. Cook laid out the town around the railroad in 1888.

The U.S. Post Office Department established the Piru Post Office on June 14, 1888. (Note: Ventura County settlements with a Post Office in 1890 included Bardsdale, Camulos, Fillmore, Matilija, Montalvo, Newbury Park, New Jerusalem, Piru City, Punta Gorda, Simi, Springville, and Timberville. Larger Post Offices in Ventura, Hueneme, Santa Paula, Saticoy, and Nordoff provided money order service (Ventura also handled International exchange).) Legend has it that the change in pronunciation was brought about by conductors of Southern Pacific Railroad trains, who would shout out, "Pie-roo!" when pulling into town. Another story tells of a Piru restaurant known for good pies. The owner hung a sign proclaiming, "We Put The Pie In Piru."

In 1890, Cook built a lavish Queen Anne Style home a few blocks northwest of his original home, which came to be known as the Piru Mansion. A strict Methodist, he provided for construction of a church on the north side of Center Street, just west of Main. The church front is used in the movie J. W. Coop starring Cliff Robertson (1972). His home at Main and Center became the Piru Hotel. Cook sold out to the Piru Oil and Land Company in 1900 after being cured of his ailments and realizing a profit due to recent oil discoveries.

For her novel Ramona (1884), Helen Hunt Jackson had used nearby Rancho Camulos as one of the settings. Portions of the 1910 silent movie of the same name, starring Mary Pickford, were shot there. During the production, Pickford, D.W. Griffith and others of the cast and crew, stayed at the Piru Hotel. The hotel later became known as the Mountain View Hotel. The name was later changed to the Round Rock Hotel, because of a large, round boulder located in the northeast corner of the front yard.

=== 20th century ===
Juan José Fustero (b. ca. 1836), who called himself "the last full-blooded Piru Indian," died on June 30, 1921. In 1961, a plaque to honor him was placed in Piru Canyon near the place where he lived most of his life.

On December 17, 1922, Jenks Harris, a would-be cowboy actor, and a gang of partners in crime, which included another actor and the president of the Pacific Autoplane Company, robbed the bank in Piru of $11,000. He said, when later caught in Los Angeles, that he conceived of the idea while on location at Piru with the film company Universal and stated he committed the robbery to pay his parents' mortgage. The gang was each sentenced from one year to life in prison at San Quentin.

In the 1950s, the Round Rock Hotel became the Round Rock Rest Home for elderly tenants, which it remained until 1989. The architectural style and pastoral setting made it a draw for the film industry. It was used in as a set in films such as The Five Heartbeats (1991) and The Silhouette. (1990). It then became the Heritage Valley Inn. It is no longer functioning as an inn.

==== Disasters ====
Piru was struck by two major disasters in the 20th century. On the night of March 12, 1928, the St. Francis Dam, to the east in Los Angeles County, broke, sending a torrent of water through the Santa Clara River Valley and causing the deaths of approximately 400 people, a number of whom were in Piru. The Northridge earthquake of January 17, 1994, destroyed several buildings in the historic downtown area.

== Geography ==
Piru is located at 34°24′26″N 118°47′59″W (34.407297, −118.799675).

According to the United States Census Bureau, the CDP has a total area of 3.2 square miles (8.3 km^{2}), of which 99.50% is land and 0.50% is water.

Elevation: 692 feet (211 m).

Piru is located in the Santa Clara River Valley.

=== Climate ===
This region experiences hot and dry summers. According to the Köppen Climate Classification system, Piru has a hot-summer Mediterranean climate, abbreviated "Csa" on climate maps.

== Economy ==
Piru has the highest percentage of agricultural workers and second-highest percent of manufacturing workers in Ventura County. 32% have occupations in manufacturing, while 28% are employed in the agricultural sector.

Piru had the lowest median home prices in Ventura County in 1999.

== Demographics ==
Historical population
Census	Pop.	Note	%±
1980	1,284		—
1990	1,157		−9.9%
2000	1,196		3.4%
2010	2,063		72.5%
2020	2,587		25.4%
U.S. Decennial Census; 1850–1870 1880-1890; 1900 1910 1920; 1930 1940 1950; 1960 1970 1980; 1990 2000 2010

Piru first appeared as a census designated place in the 1980 U.S. census.

=== 2020 census ===
As of the 2020 census, Piru had a population of 2,587 and a population density of 813.8 inhabitants per square mile (314.2/km^{2}). The median age was 32.5 years. The age distribution was 28.6% under 18, 10.4% from 18 to 24, 25.9% from 25 to 44, 24.1% from 45 to 64, and 11.0% age 65 or older. For every 100 females, there were 107.0 males, and for every 100 females age 18 and over, there were 104.4 males.

0.0% of residents lived in urban areas, while 100.0% lived in rural areas.

All residents lived in households. There were 682 households, of which 51.9% had children under the age of 18 living in them. Of all households, 65.0% were married-couple households, 6.7% were cohabiting couple households, 11.1% were households with a male householder and no spouse or partner present, and 17.2% were households with a female householder and no spouse or partner present. About 9.2% of all households were made up of individuals, and 4.7% had someone living alone who was 65 years of age or older. The average household size was 3.79. There were 590 families (86.5% of all households).

There were 705 housing units at an average density of 221.8 units per square mile (85.6 units/km^{2}), of which 96.7% were occupied and 3.3% were vacant. Of occupied units, 49.1% were owner-occupied and 50.9% were occupied by renters. The homeowner vacancy rate was 0.9% and the rental vacancy rate was 0.3%.

Racial composition as of the 2020 census
Race	Number	Percent
White	648	25.0%
Black or African American	5	0.2%
American Indian and Alaska Native	79	3.1%
Asian	12	0.5%
Native Hawaiian and Other Pacific Islander	0	0.0%
Some other race	1,328	51.3%
Two or more races	515	19.9%
Hispanic or Latino (of any race)	2,315	89.5%

=== Income and poverty ===
In 2023, the US Census Bureau estimated that the median household income was $96,765, and the per capita income was $31,137. About 8.1% of families and 6.8% of the population were below the poverty line.

=== 2010 census ===
The 2010 United States census reported that Piru had a population of 2,063. The population density was 727.6 inhabitants per square mile (280.9/km^{2}). The racial makeup of Piru was 1,063 (51.5%) White, 16 (0.8%) African American, 43 (2.1%) Native American, 11 (0.5%) Asian, 0 (0.0%) Pacific Islander, 830 (40.2%) from other races, and 100 (4.8%) from two or more races. Hispanic or Latino of any race were 1,748 persons (84.7%).

The Census reported that 2,063 people (100% of the population) lived in households, 0 (0%) lived in non-institutionalized group quarters, and 0 (0%) were institutionalized.

There were 523 households, out of which 292 (55.8%) had children under the age of 18 living in them, 329 (62.9%) were opposite-sex married couples living together, 69 (13.2%) had a female householder with no husband present, 39 (7.5%) had a male householder with no wife present. There were 29 (5.5%) unmarried opposite-sex partnerships, and 2 (0.4%) same-sex married couples or partnerships. 67 households (12.8%) were made up of individuals, and 25 (4.8%) had someone living alone who was 65 years of age or older. The average household size was 3.94. There were 437 families (83.6% of all households); the average family size was 4.34.

The population was spread out, with 676 people (32.8%) under the age of 18, 243 people (11.8%) aged 18 to 24, 569 people (27.6%) aged 25 to 44, 420 people (20.4%) aged 45 to 64, and 155 people (7.5%) who were 65 years of age or older. The median age was 29.4 years. For every 100 females, there were 106.5 males. For every 100 females age 18 and over, there were 105.2 males.

There were 561 housing units at an average density of 197.9 per square mile (76.4/km^{2}), of which 302 (57.7%) were owner-occupied, and 221 (42.3%) were occupied by renters. The homeowner vacancy rate was 1.6%; the rental vacancy rate was 4.3%. 1,202 people (58.3% of the population) lived in owner-occupied housing units and 861 people (41.7%) lived in rental housing units.

== Infrastructure ==
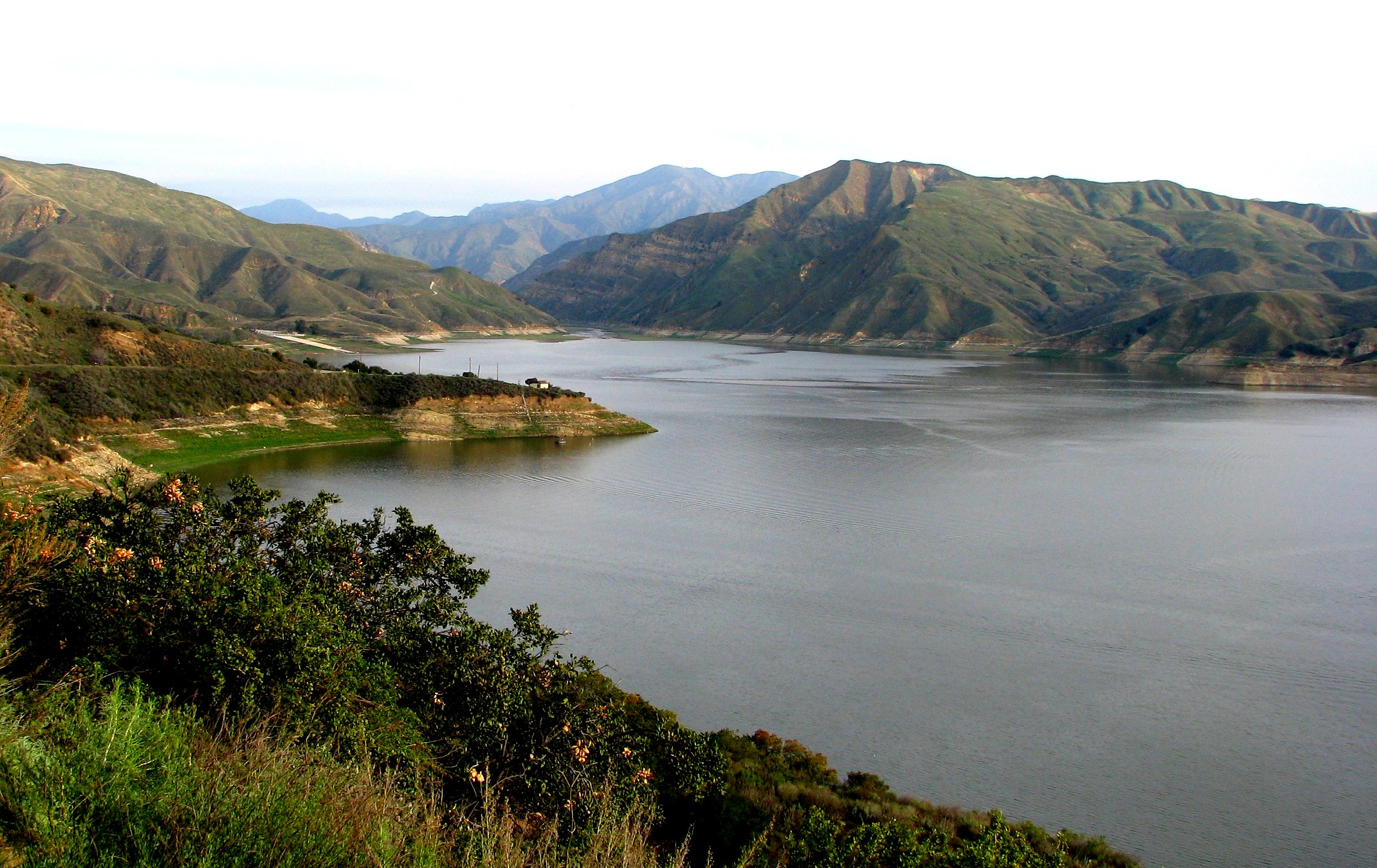
Lake Piru, 2009

Ventura County Waterworks District No. 16 provides sewer service to the more densely populated historic town center around the railroad line on the west side of Piru Creek. The district's service area also includes a small area east of the creek and certain areas south of the settlement along Main Street.

== Education ==
Fillmore Unified School District operates Piru Elementary School. The district also operates Fillmore Middle School and Fillmore High School in Fillmore.

== Use as filming location ==
Piru has been used for shooting film and television productions over the years, including Desert Fury (1947). Location scenes were shot with the northwest side of Center Street, at Main, used as the exterior of Fritzi Haller's saloon and casino; the Piru Mansion was used as the Haller home and the historic Piru bridge, crossing Piru Creek on the east side of town, was used as the locale of the car crash. (Some of the exterior scenes were also filmed in the Old Town section of Cottonwood, Arizona, especially where Burt Lancaster enters the Old Town jail, extant though enlarged.) Piru was also used in the scene in A Star Is Born (1954) starring Judy Garland and James Mason where Jack Carson's character, Libby, finds them after they are married. Piru was also featured in the 1966 film Incident at Phantom Hill.

Piru stood in for a fictional town Clarksberg, California in the 1974 TV movie The California Kid. Piru was used as a location for the 1974 Rockford Files episode 'Caledonia, It's Worth a Fortune.' It was used for exterior shots in the 1975 Filmation children's series The Ghost Busters. Charlie's Angels filmed "Angel's on Vacation" in Piru in 1979. Scenes in The Fugitive, The A-Team, The Dukes of Hazzard, Murder, She Wrote, NCIS and Monk were filmed in Piru. In the 1981 made-for-TV horror film Dark Night of the Scarecrow, several of the primary locations in the film, including the café, post office and service station, are in Piru.

In Twilight Zone: The Movie (1983), the scenes of the rest home in the "Kick the Can" segment were filmed at the historic building that is now the Heritage Valley Inn. Dolly Parton and Sylvester Stallone filmed scenes for Rhinestone (1984), in Piru. Also Silent Night Deadly Night 3 was filmed here, in 1984.

The town served as the fictional San Remos countryside in the movie Cobra, starring Sylvester Stallone, Reni Santoni and Brigitte Nielsen.

With the exception of a few scenes, the entire comedy Happy, Texas (1999) was filmed in Piru. It was also used for scenes of Bubble Boy. The exterior of Piru United Methodist Church was used in Big Momma's House (2001). The chase scene in Enough (2002) starring Jennifer Lopez was filmed in Piru along with scenes from Torque (2004) and the final scene for Van Helsing (2004).

The 2005 movie The Amateurs starring Jeff Bridges was largely filmed in Piru – as was much of the television movie The Love War (1970) starring Jeff's father Lloyd Bridges, with Angie Dickinson (with Piru serving as location and setting). The town has also served for some of the scenes on TV's Reno 911! and for scenes set in the fictional town of Bon Temps, Louisiana, in True Blood.

In the Disney movie Race to Witch Mountain (2009) starring Dwayne "The Rock" Johnson, scenes where he and the alien boy and girl go into a small town, Stony Creek, where they have repairs done on his taxi and go to a restaurant/country music club, were actually shot in Piru, which continues to be a popular location with film companies.

Piru Mansion was used as the home of Ellis Wyatt in Atlas Shrugged: Part I (2011), the first segment in a three-part movie adaptation of the novel by Ayn Rand. Piru was also used to film the 2011 music video "Don't Stop (Color on the Walls)" from the band Foster the People and featuring actress Gabourey Sidibe.

The Dexter season 6 episode "Nebraska" which aired in 2011 was partially filmed in Piru, with Piru standing in for parts of Nebraska.

The 2013 music video for the hit Wake Me Up by Avicii, starring the Russian model Kristina Romanova and the young Californian model Laneya Grace.

Water for Elephants was also filmed in Piru as well as Alicia Keys' Unthinkable music video.

The 2014 action-drama film Swelter, starring Jean-Claude Van Damme, Lennie James, and Alfred Molina, was filmed entirely in Piru, per the DVD credits, with the town substituting for Baker, Nevada.

The 2017 movie Lucky, starring Harry Dean Stanton, was filmed in Piru.
