= Rancho San Francisco =

Mexican land grant in present-day Los Angeles and Ventura counties, California

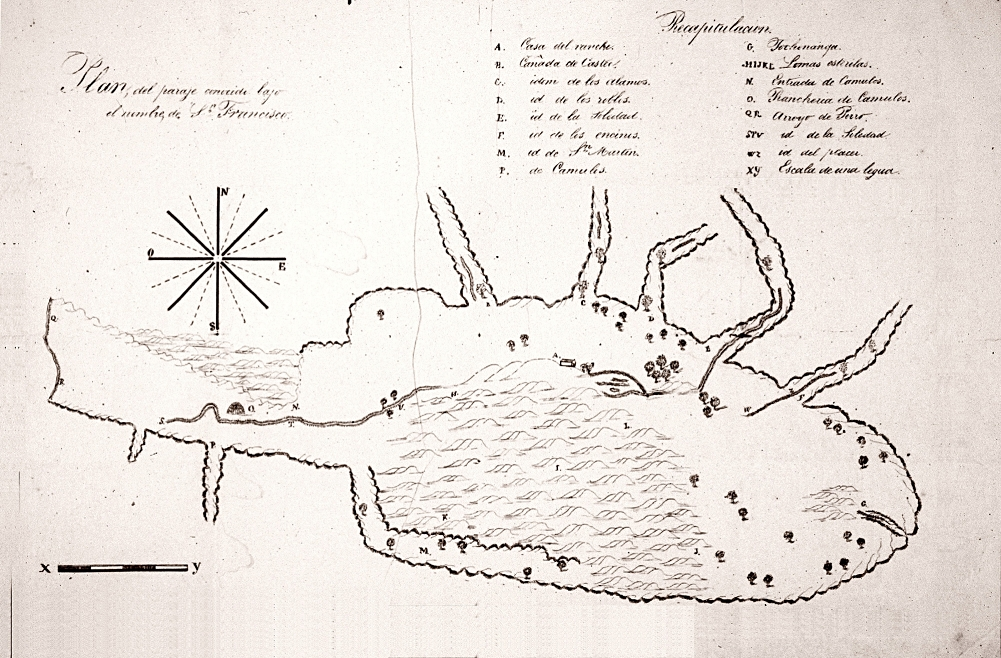
- 1843 map of Rancho San Francisco
- Interactive map of Rancho San Francisco
- 34°26′02″N 118°36′28″W
- Location: Northwestern Los Angeles County and eastern Ventura County, California, US

History
- Established: January 22, 1839

Site notes
- Area: 48,612 acres (19,673 ha)

California Historical Landmark
- Official name: Rancho San Francisco
- Reference no.: 556

California Historical Landmark
- Official name: Oak of the Golden Dream
- Reference no.: 168

Rancho San Francisco was a land grant in present-day northwestern Los Angeles County and eastern Ventura County, California. It was a grant of 48,612 acres (19,673 ha) by Governor Juan B. Alvarado to Antonio del Valle, a Mexican army officer, in recognition for his service to Alta California. It is not related to the city of San Francisco.

The rancho is the location of the first popularly known finding of gold in the Southern California area in 1842, in Placerita Canyon. Much of the present day city of Santa Clarita lies within the boundary of what was Rancho San Francisco. The adobe headquarters of the rancho, and the site of the gold find (known today as the "Oak of the Golden Dream"), are designated California Historical Landmarks. The rancho included portions of the San Gabriel, Santa Susana, Topatopa, and Sierra Pelona Mountain ranges.

== Early history ==
After Mission San Fernando Rey de España was established in 1797, the administrators there realized they would need more land for agriculture and livestock, and they looked north to the Santa Clarita Valley to establish their estancia, or mission rancho. Subsequently, the Tataviam who had been living there were relocated to the Mission, where they were baptized and conscripted for work. The Estancia de San Francisco Xavier was built in 1804 at the confluence of Castaic Creek and the Santa Clara River in what is now the unincorporated community of Castaic Junction.

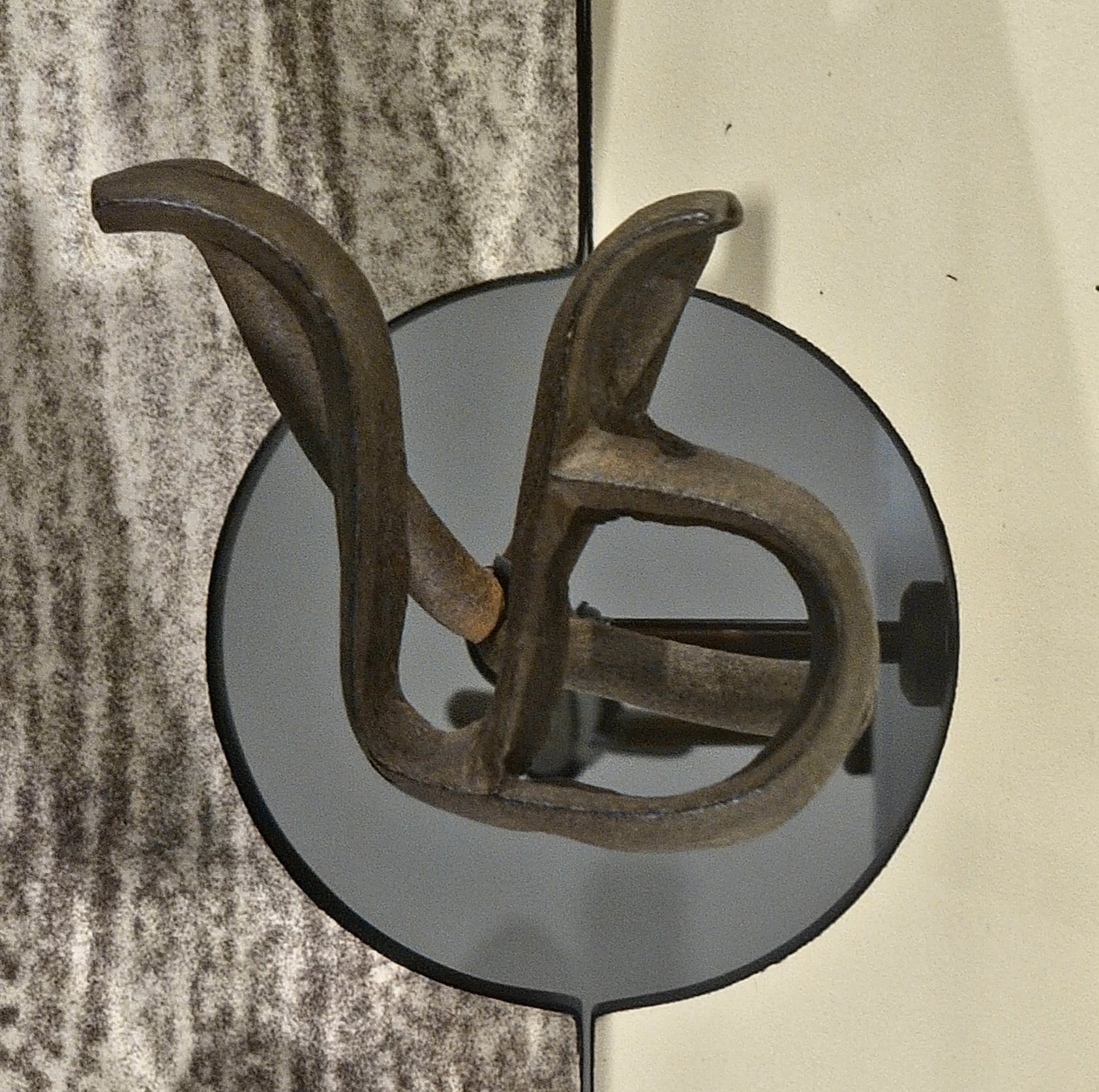
Head of a branding iron bearing Rancho San Francisco's mark

Following the Mexican War of Independence, the missions were secularized and the land taken by the Mexican government. In 1834, Lieutenant Antonio del Valle was assigned to inventory the property of Mission San Fernando. The rancho was supposed to be returned to the Tataviam, but Governor Alvarado deeded it to his friend Del Valle instead on January 22, 1839. The Del Valle family moved into the former estancia buildings (near what is now Castaic).

Del Valle died in 1841. On his deathbed, he attempted to reconcile with his estranged son Ygnacio by writing him a letter and offering the entire rancho to him as his inheritance. Del Valle died before his son received the letter. Ygnacio did return and took possession of the land, but after a lawsuit the property was split with his stepmother.

== Discovery of gold ==
Oak of the Golden Dream
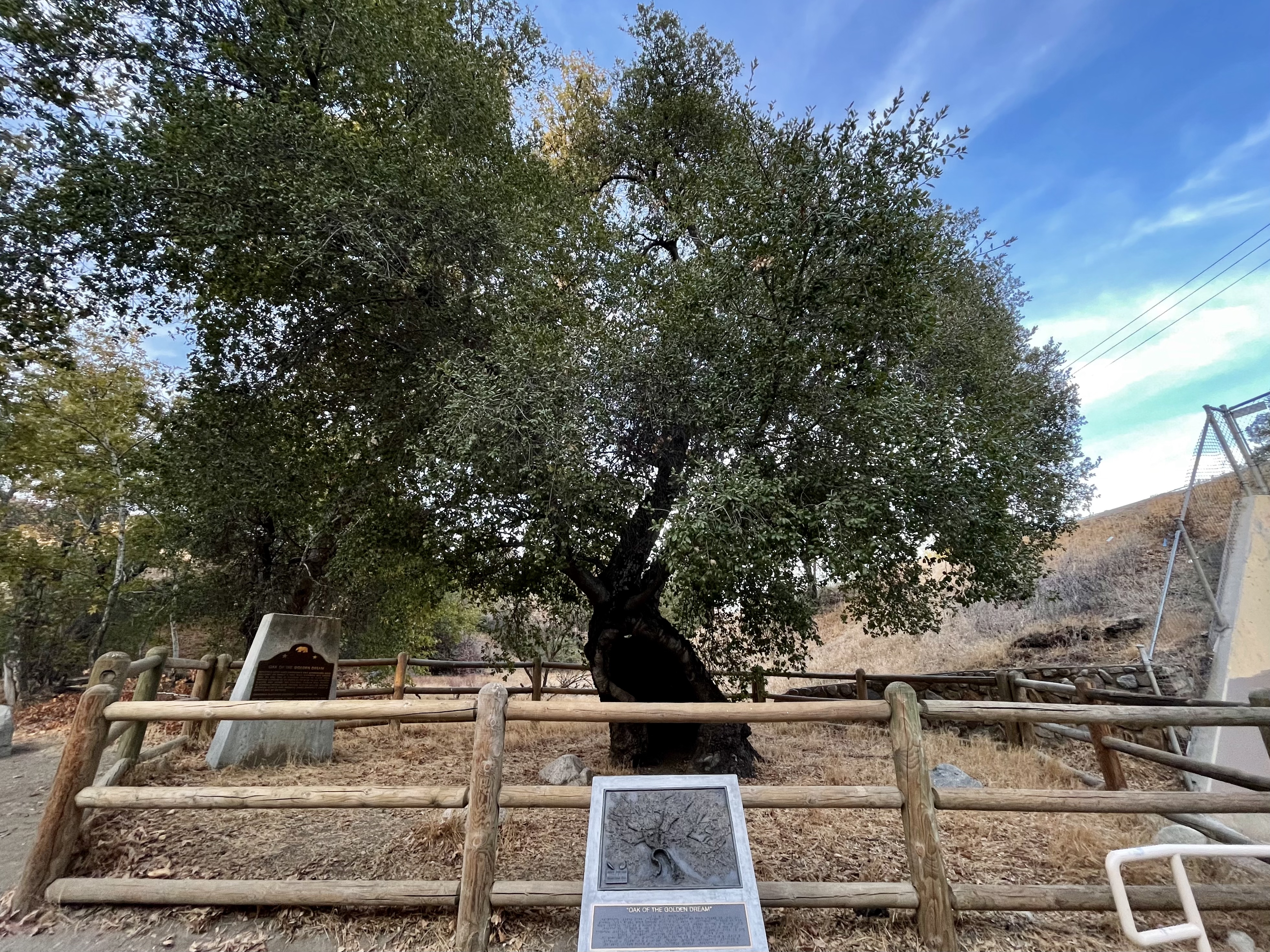
- Oak of the Golden Dream, 2021

- Location within Santa Clarita Location within California
- Native name: Roble del Sueño Dorado (Spanish)
- Species: Coast live oak
- Location: Placerita Canyon State Park, California, United States
- Coordinates: 34°22′37″N 118°28′17″W

According to a local legend, Francisco López, the uncle of Antonio's second wife, Jacoba Feliz, took a rest under an oak tree in Placerita Canyon on March 9, 1842, and had a dream that he was floating on a pool of gold. When he awoke, he pulled a few wild onions from the ground finding flakes of gold in the roots. Contrary to this portrait of him as a farmer who stumbled upon his discovery, López had studied mineralogy at the University of Mexico and had been actively searching for gold. Evidence suggests that gold had previously been found in the area about thirty years prior, but the López gold find was the first popularly documented incident in the area. This sparked a gold rush on a much smaller scale than the 1849 California Gold Rush. About 2,000 people, mostly from the Mexican state of Sonora, came to Rancho San Francisco to mine the gold.

Knowledge of the gold find seems to have remained largely within Mexican territory. John Sutter and his "right-hand man" John Bidwell, both of whom sided with Governor Manuel Micheltorena during his power struggle with former governor Juan Bautista Alvarado, were imprisoned after the latter's side won the bloodless Battle of Providencia in 1845. After their release, Bidwell headed north through Placerita Canyon, saw the mining operations, and was determined to search for gold on his way to Sutter's Fort. (Note: In his own recollections, Bidwell states that he visited the mines of one Baptiste Ruelle, but he like many others had only heard rumors of the discovery and was mistaken about both when it took place and who had done it.)

During the Mexican–American War, Del Valle destroyed the mine to prevent the United States from gaining its control. The tree where López took his nap is now known as the "Oak of the Golden Dream" and is registered as California Historic Landmark #168.

== Later history ==
With the cession of California to the United States following the Mexican-American War, the 1848 Treaty of Guadalupe Hidalgo provided that the land grants would be honored. As required by the Land Act of 1851, Jacoba Feliz filed a claim for Rancho San Francisco in 1852. She received a patent for 48,611.88 acres in 1875. Ygnacio Del Valle received the westernmost portion of 13,599 acres (55.03 km^{2}), Feliz (now Salazár) took 21,307 acres (86.23 km^{2}), and her six children received 4,684 acres (18.96 km^{2}) each.

Unfortunately, at this time Southern California experienced a great deal of flooding, and ranchers were forced to mortgage their properties in order to sustain their needs during the interruption in producing their food and needs and other damages to the land and buildings. Feliz mortgaged her portion of the land to William Wolfskill, who returned a portion of it back to Del Valle in exchange for him settling her debts. Floods were followed by droughts, which again exacerbated the ranchers' problems. Finally, in 1862 Del Valle was forced to sell off most of his land to oil speculators (the Philadelphia and California Petroleum Company headed by Thomas A. Scott), keeping only his Rancho Camulos. The oilmen were unable to find any oil, and Rancho San Francisco eventually landed in the hands of Henry Newhall, whose name is now closely associated with the Santa Clarita Valley area.

Newhall granted right-of-way to Southern Pacific Railroad to build a rail line to Los Angeles and sold them a portion of the land, upon which sprang a new town that the company named after him, Newhall. Another town grew around the train station and Newhall named it after his hometown, Saugus.

After Newhall's death in 1882, his heirs formed the Newhall Land and Farming Company, which managed the lands. In 1936, Atholl McBean, Newhall's grandson-in-law, found oil on the property and changed the name to Newhall Ranch.

== Historic designations ==
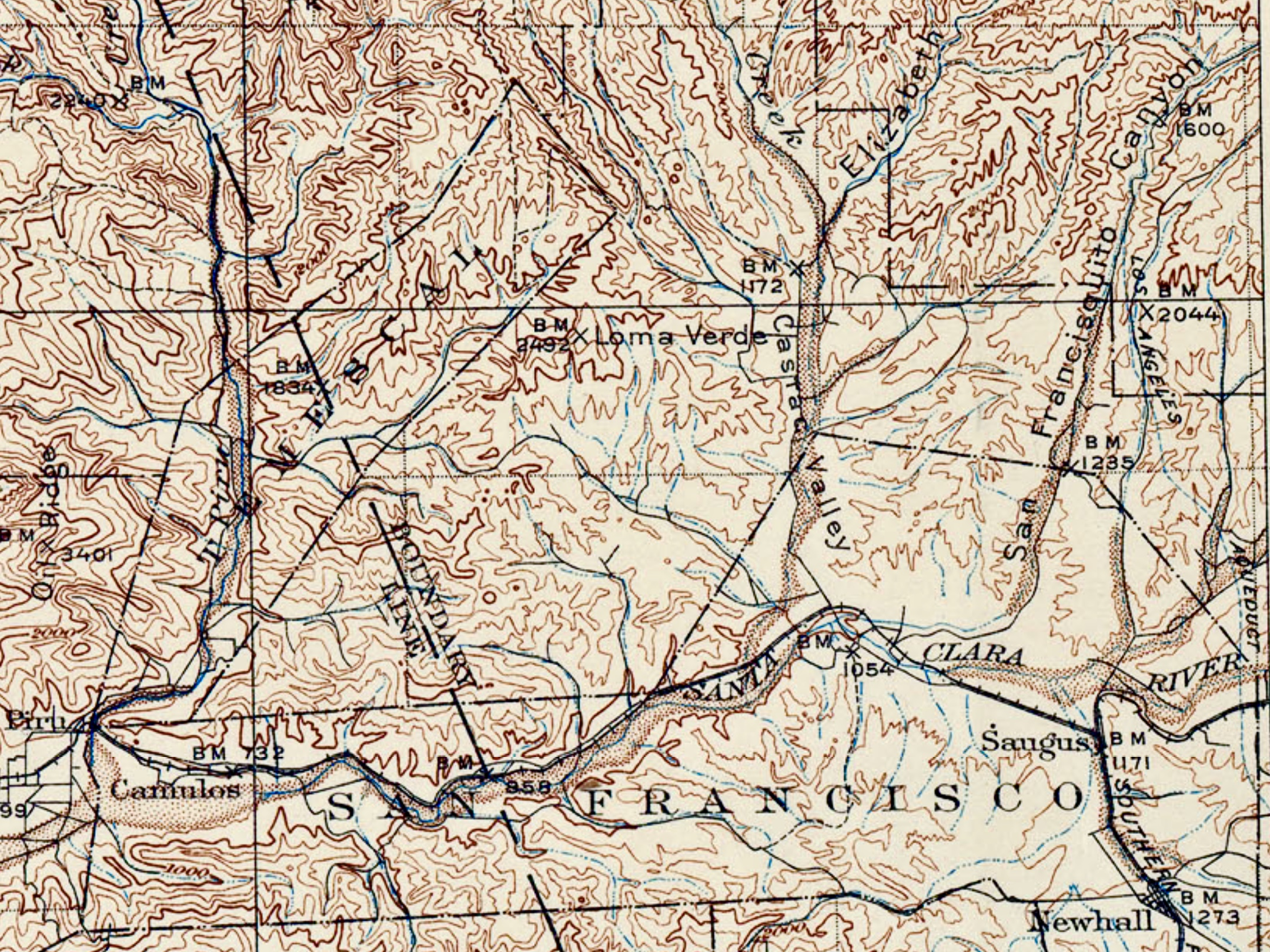
Topographical map of Rancho San Francisco by the US Geological Survey, surveyed 1893–1904. (Tap to enlarge.)

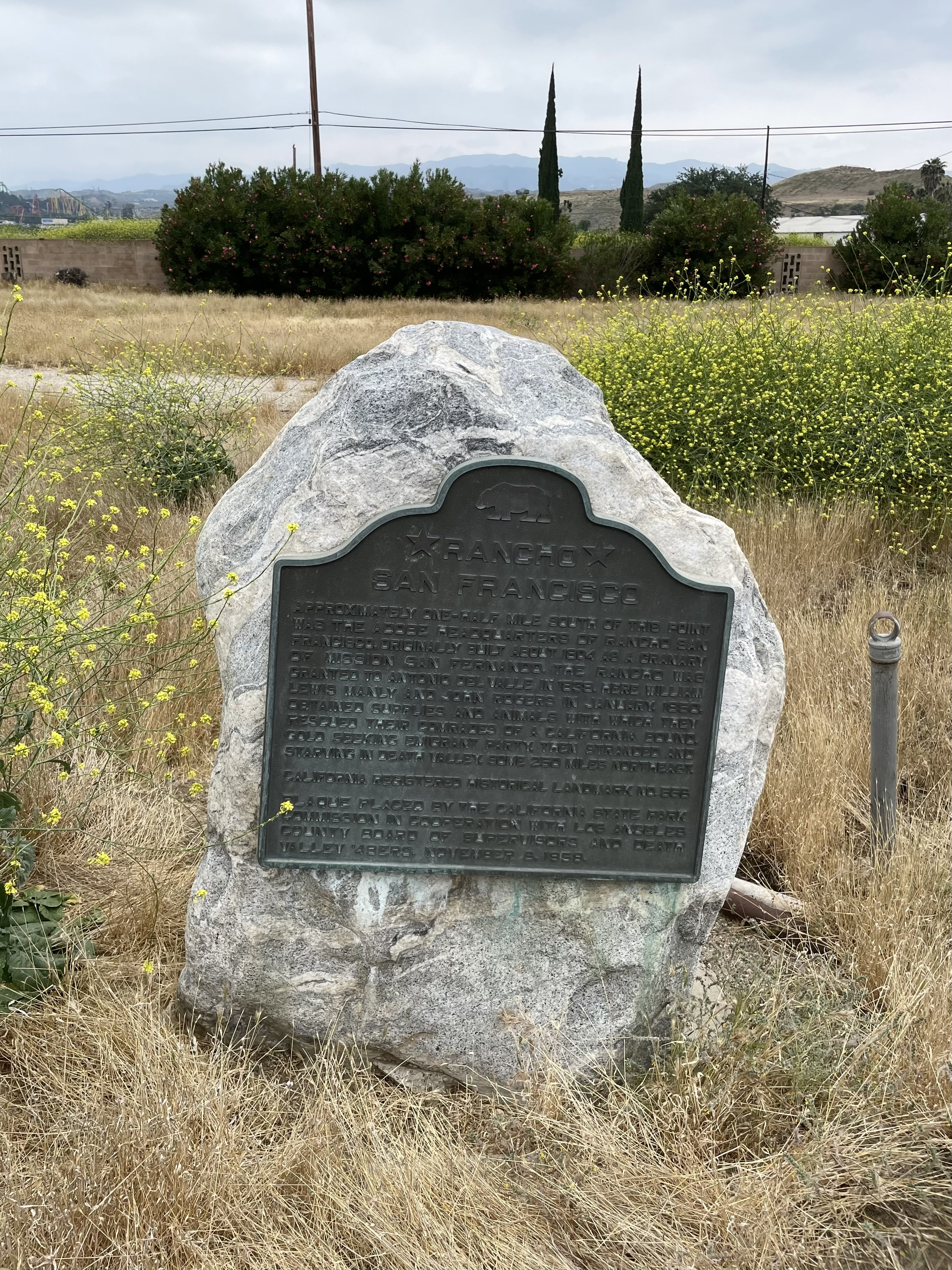
CHL No. 556 Rancho San Francisco is located about 0.5 mi (0.80 km) NNE of the ruins of the San Francisco Xavier Estancia

California Historical Landmark No. 556 Rancho San Francisco Adobe marker reads:

NO. 556 RANCHO SAN FRANCISCO – Approximately one-half mile south of the point was the adobe headquarters of Rancho San Francisco, originally built about 1804 as a granary of Mission San Fernando. The rancho was granted to Antonio de Valle in 1839. Here, in January 1850, William Lewis Manly and John Rogers obtained supplies and animals to rescue their comrades in a California-bound gold-seeking emigrant party that was stranded and starving in Death Valley, some 250 miles to the northeast.

Placerita Canyon State Park – California Historical Landmark No. 168 Oak of the Golden Dream: where Francisco López found gold. The marker reads:

NO. 168 OAK OF THE GOLDEN DREAM – Francisco López made California's first authenticated gold discovery on March 9, 1842. While gathering wild onions near an oak tree in Placerita Canyon he found gold particles clinging to the roots of the bulbs. The San Fernando placers and nearby San Feliciano Canyon were worked by Sonoran miners using panning, sluicing and dry washing methods. Lopez's find predated James Marshall strike at Sutter's Mill by six years.

== See also ==
- Ranchos of California
- List of Ranchos of California
- List of rancho land grants in Los Angeles County, California
