= The Love War =

- Written by: David Kidd; Guerdon Trueblood
- Directed by: George McCowan
- Starring: Lloyd Bridges; Angie Dickinson
- Country of origin: United States
- Original language: English

Production
- Producer: Aaron Spelling
- Running time: 74 minutes

Original release
- Release: March 10, 1970

The Love War (1970) is a science fiction ABC Movie of the Week starring Lloyd Bridges as an alien warrior and Angie Dickinson as the woman he befriends.

== Plot ==
Two warring planets choose to settle their conflict over which of them will take over the planet Earth, each sending a trio of soldiers to Earth to fight to the death. The combatants, disguised as human beings, can only identify each other by using special visors.

Kyle, one of the combatants, falls in love with Sandy, a woman he meets during his stay in a small town. In the end, despite cheating by the other side, Kyle is the sole survivor, but before he can signal his people he has won, Sandy shoots him with one of the alien weapons. A dying Kyle then learns that Sandy is also an alien; the other side has cheated twice. She chose duty to her people over her love for him. Weeping as she watches him die, she asks him what their half-breed children would have been. The film's closing shot shows Sandy through the visor as she really is — a hideously scarred humanoid.

== Setting ==
The setting is north-central California, as the final showdown is held in a small town described as being near the city of Fresno. Much of the action was filmed in and around the town of Piru near Los Angeles.

== Reception ==
Moria gave the movie three stars finding it good for its time, although noting it is not "hard" sci fi.

== Cast ==
- Lloyd Bridges as Kyle
- Angie Dickinson as Sandy
- Harry Basch as Bal
- Daniel J. Travanti as Ted (as Dan Travanty)
- Allen Jaffe as Hort
- Bill McLean as Reed
- Byron Foulger as Will
- Pepper Martin
- Bob Nash as Limo Driver
- Art Lewis

== Home media ==
The movie was released on VHS cassette tape in the United Kingdom by Guild Home Video.

== See also ==
- List of American films of 1970
