= Ygnacio del Valle =

Prominent landowner in early California (1808–1880)

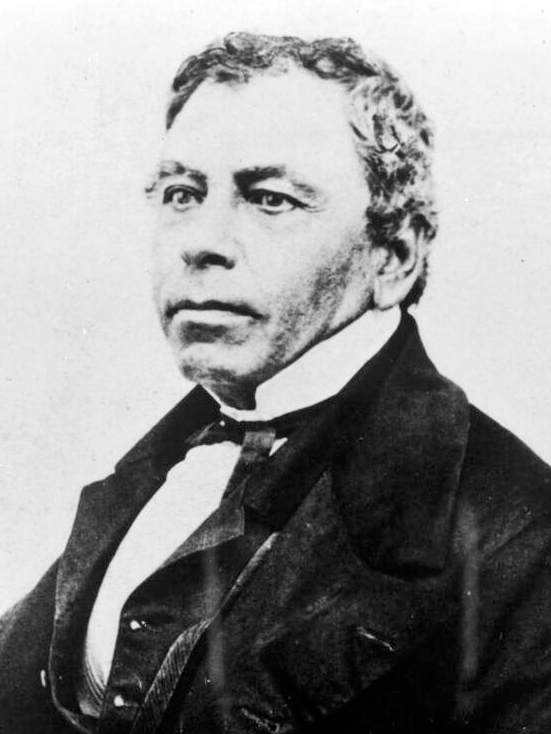
- del Valle in 1860

De Facto Mayor of Los Angeles
- In office January 1, 1850 – July 1, 1850
- Preceded by: Stephen Clark Foster(1849)
- Succeeded by: Alpheus P. Hodges (post-statehood)

Member of the California State Assembly from the 2nd district
- In office January 5, 1852 – January 3, 1853
- Preceded by: Multi-member district
- Succeeded by: Multi-member district

Member of the Los Angeles Common Council
- In office 1856–1856
- Preceded by: At-large districts
- Succeeded by: At-large districts
- In office 1852–1852
- Preceded by: At-large districts
- Succeeded by: At-large districts

Personal details
- Born: July 1, 1808 New Kingdom of Galicia, New Spain (now Jalisco, Mexico)
- Died: March 30, 1880 Rancho Camulos; Piru, California, U.S.
- Party: Democratic
- Spouse: Ysabel del Valle (m. 1851)
- Children: 12, including Reginaldo
- Relatives: Antonio del Valle (father); Lucretia del Valle Grady (granddaughter)
- Occupation: Ranchero, politician

Ygnacio Ramón de Jesus del Valle (July 1, 1808 – 1880) was a Californio ranchero and politician. He owned much of the Santa Clarita Valley and served briefly as Mayor of Los Angeles and as a California State Assemblyman.

== Early life ==
Del Valle was born in Jalisco, Mexico. His father, Antonio del Valle, was a soldier in the Spanish army who came to California in 1819 and was mayordomo (administrator and/or foreman) of Mission San Fernando Rey de España. Ygnacio joined the army as a cadet in 1825 at the Presidio of Santa Barbara. In 1828 he was promoted to second lieutenant and transferred to the Presidio of San Diego. In 1832, his commander became involved in a power struggle with the commandant of the Presidio of Monterey, where Antonio served. Ygnacio's side won the conflict on the battlefield, causing a rift between father and son, and they never spoke again.

Ygnacio then moved to the Monterey Presidio and was in charge of the secularization of Mission Santa Cruz and Mission San Francisco de Asís. He became a trusted officer, enough to be left in charge of the Presidio in José Figueroa's absence. For his service to the Mexican Army, del Valle received the Rancho El Tejon land grant in 1843. During this time, he married Maria de Los Angeles Carrillo in 1842.

== Ranchos ==
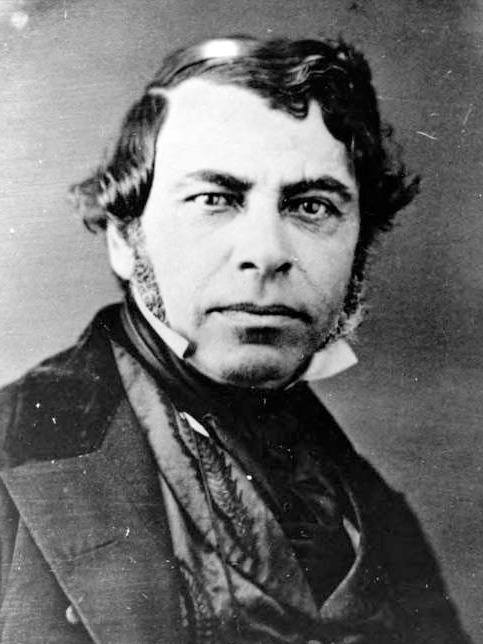
del Valle in an undated photograph

Antonio died in 1841 without leaving a will. On his deathbed, he decided he wanted to reconcile with his son and, in a letter, offered Ygnacio several properties, including the 48,612-acre (197 km^{2}) Rancho San Francisco land grant he had received. He died before the letter was delivered to Ygnacio, but the son returned to the family homestead to administer the ranch anyway. Without a will specifying how the estate was to be divided, Jacoba Feliz, Antonio's second wife who remarried after his death, filed a lawsuit to claim part of the land, which was the site the first recorded discovery of gold in California, sparking a minor gold rush in 1842, six years before the more famous California Gold Rush. Eventually, the lawsuit was decided and the land was split, with Ygnacio receiving the 13,599-acre (55 km^{2}) Rancho Camulos.

However, del Valle did not live on this land initially, instead residing in the Olvera Street area of Los Angeles, where he was active in local politics. In the 1840s, he served on the junta (the equivalent of a city council) as a member and its secretary, as well as treasurer of civil government under Governor Pío Pico. In 1850, he was elected alcalde of Los Angeles and served only a short time before the city was incorporated as an American city, but during his tenure he established the Los Angeles Rangers, an early law enforcement group. After California achieved statehood later that year, del Valle served in the California State Assembly for a short period.

He was elected to a one-year term in the Los Angeles Common Council in 1852. and was elected again in May 1856 but resigned in December of that year.

== Marriage ==
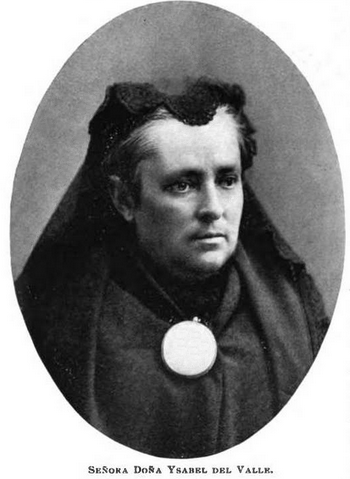
Ysabel del Valle, Ygnacio's wife.

In 1852, at the age of 44, he married 15-year-old Ysabel Varela. Del Valle remained on the City Council for five years, after which he devoted his time to improving Rancho Camulos. The del Valle family, including five children, finally moved to the rancho in 1861. Ysabel del Valle was known to help poor and orphaned children and when then moved (to Rancho Camulos) she brought eight orphans to live with her family.

== Later life ==
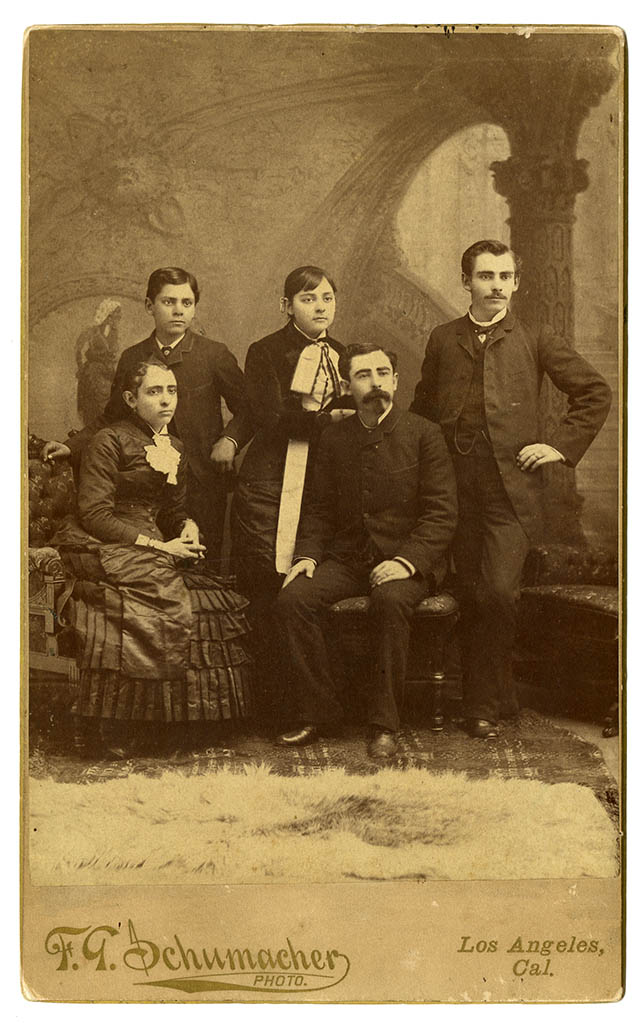
Ygnacio's children, including Reginaldo F. del Valle.

However, the late 1850s and early 1860s were difficult for ranchers in Southern California. Severe flooding had caused great damage to many ranchos. Despite this, the Del Valle family, like many Californios, continued to live beyond its means. Del Valle had to pay off the debts of his stepmother, Jacoba Feliz, in return for which received part of her land inheritance. He had already sold off his Rancho Tejon to pay his own debts as well. The winter floods of 1861-62 were followed by droughts which lasted for three years, which forced del Valle to sell off his remaining land. He was left with 1,500 acres (6 km^{2}) of his Rancho Camulos. The ranch grew the first commercially grown oranges in Ventura County.

Through 1870, the del Valles had seven more children; five of the twelve lived to adulthood. One, Reginaldo, became the youngest-ever president of the California State Senate at age 28 and was instrumental in the preservation of Mission San Fernando, as well as the movement to have the El Camino Real marked with bells.

Ygnacio del Valle died in 1880 and was buried on his rancho. Ysabel took over the running of rancho until 1900, then moved back to Los Angeles. In 1905, the ailing woman "refused to die" until she could be reunited with her long-dead husband. His remains were exhumed and moved to Los Angeles. Soon after their arrival, Ysabel died, and she was buried in the same coffin as Ygnacio. They are buried at Calvary Cemetery.
