= Bardsdale, California =

Unincorporated community in California, United States

- Unincorporated community
- Location within the State of California.
- Coordinates: 34°22′18″N 118°55′55″W
- Country: United States
- U.S. state: California
- County: Ventura
- Town established: 1887

Government
  - State senator: Rosilicie Ochoa Bogh (R)
  - Assemblymember: Gregg Hart (D)
  - U. S. rep.: Julia Brownley (D)
- Elevation: 430 ft (131 m)
- Time zone: UTC-8 (Pacific)
  - Summer (DST): UTC-7 (PDT)
- ZIP code: 93015 (Fillmore P.O.)
- Area code: 805
- FIPS code: 06-03932
- GNIS feature ID: 269673

Bardsdale is a rural unincorporated community and populated place in Ventura County, California, United States. It is located in the orange blossom and agricultural belt of the Santa Clara River Valley, south of the Santa Clara River and on the north slope of South Mountain. The closest town is Fillmore, which is on the north side of the Santa Clara, approximately 3 miles (5 km) from Bardsdale. Santa Paula is about 7 miles (11 km) west, the most direct route being South Mountain Road. Moorpark is about 6 miles (10 km) south over the serpentine mountain road known as Grimes Canyon.

The Bardsdale area has long been a center of citrus ranching, having a large number of verdant orange orchards with home sites interspersed among them. The citrus of Sunkist growers in Bardsdale is sold throughout the country and around the world. Oranges - mostly Valencias - are the main crop, other crops include lemons, avocados, and row cropped vegetables.

Bardsdale gently slopes from South Mountain to the river and has a sweeping, panoramic view of the Santa Clara River Valley, dominated by the peaks of the Sespe and San Cayetano Mountains. The community is home to the Bardsdale United Methodist Church, which is listed on the National Register of Historic Places.

The Bardsdale Cemetery serves the community as well as Fillmore, which has no other cemetery. The Elkins Ranch Golf Course is on the eastern edge of Bardsdale.

The area is serviced by the Ventura County Sheriff's Department and the Ventura County Fire Department.

== History ==
Bardsdale was established in 1887 by real estate developer Royce G. Surdam (1835–1891) on 1,500 acres (6 km^{2}) of the old Rancho Sespe grant that he purchased from his business associate Thomas R. Bard, in whose honor he named the town. Surdam subdivided Bardsdale into 3-acre (12,141 m^{2}) lots and 10-acre (40,469 m^{2}) blocks. He laid out the town with such street names as San Cayetano, Hueneme, Sespe, Santa Paula, Ventura, Owen, Ojai and Simi Streets, running from north to south, including Chambersburg Street, which was named for Thomas Bard's hometown of Chambersburg, Pennsylvania. The others, from west to east, were named as avenues, such as Riverside, Pasadena, Bardsdale, Los Angeles and California Avenues.

At about the same time that the town was laid out by Surdam, the Southern Pacific Railroad ran tracks through the valley, between Newhall and Ventura, on the north side of the Santa Clara River. They built a station about 5 miles (8 km) away from Bardsdale and named it Fillmore Station in honor of the company's general superintendent, Jerome A. Fillmore.

On March 22, 1887, Surdam began running $4.00 round trip tri-weekly train excursions from Los Angeles to Fillmore Station, to see Bardsdale "the Eden of Southern California!," which he advertised in the Los Angeles Times. The U.S. Post Office Department established Bardsdale Post Office on May 18, 1887, (Note: Ventura County settlements with a Post Office in 1890 included Bardsdale, Camulos, Fillmore, Matilija, Montalvo, Newbury Park, New Jerusalem, Piru City, Punta Gorda, Simi, Springville, and Timberville. Larger Post Offices in Ventura, Hueneme, Santa Paula, Saticoy, and Nordoff provided money order service (Ventura also handled International exchange).) and Surdam was appointed the first postmaster. The post office was located on Chambersberg Street. A small community began to develop around the train station, taking the name Fillmore. It had no post office then and the mail was delivered from Bardsdale. Surdam would ride over the Santa Clara River on horseback and pick up the mail bag at the station, then return to the post office in Bardsdale. After sorting, he would ride back over the river and deliver the mail to the few residents at Fillmore.

The Bardsdale Cemetery was established soon after the town was founded. There were no citrus orchards in and around the center of Bardsdale at that time. Residents raised what they thought would grow best. Among the various crops were barley, cabbage and potatoes. A large German colony moved to Bardsdale from the Midwest. Their small church was used as the first school.

The first meeting of the Bardsdale School Board was held on May 8, 1888. Two of the members, J.C. Wilson and B. Broderson, were appointed by the Ventura County Superintendent of Schools, while Brice Grimes was a member by virtue of the statute law. Their first duty was to call an election. The election was held in Robertson's Store in Bardsdale, and eight votes were cast. Henry Klages and B.T. Chadsey were elected to the Board. On May 22, 1888, the Board hired Miss Nettie Hamilton to teach for three weeks. The following August, Miss Jessie Fuller was hired to teach for four months at a salary of $65 a month.

Bardsdale was still without a schoolhouse. A lot was donated for one on the east side of Ventura Street, between Pasadena and Bardsdale Avenues, but there were no funds to build it. On October 20, 1888, 11 votes were cast for the purpose of building and furnishing a schoolhouse for $1,722. The school term was divided into two parts. Fuller's term ended on December 14 and, on February 11, 1889, Miss Lillian Gibbons began the second term at $60 a month. In the meantime, O.J. Goodenough was awarded the "contract to build the Bardsdale Schoolhouse according to the plans and specifications, all complete, and he to furnish all material and do or cause to be done all work in a good and workman like manner for $1,397, excepting outhouses."

An article about Bardsdale in the Los Angeles Times of May 22, 1889, reads:

"This is a thriving settlement in the heart of the beautiful Santa Clara Valley, 52 miles from Los Angeles and 26 miles from San Buenaventura. It is two years old, has one church and parsonage, one store (general merchandise), post office, two blacksmith shops, one hotel, 13 residences, public schoolhouse under construction, ditch five miles long, which is being enlarged to six feet on bottom, eight feet on top, three feet deep, with a capacity of 2000 inches of water. Nearly the entire tract of 3200 acres is under a high state of cultivation. There is this year 200 acres of potatoes, 300 acres of corn, and the balance in barley, all of which promises an abundant harvest. The writer has been a resident for two years, and finds it the healthiest place in Southern California. Sunshine."

On June 8, 1889, the new schoolhouse was accepted by the trustees. A motion was moved and carried, unanimously, "that the schoolhouse should not be used for dancing, and that smoking and chewing tobacco be prohibited in the schoolroom and smoking on the ground."

Miss Minnie Taylor was the first teacher in the new schoolhouse. She began on August 12, 1889, earning $60 a month. The school had one room, with a huge sheet iron stove in the back, and a cloak room. There were two entrances, one for the girls and one for the boys, and the desks and seats were made for two students. There were nine grades, as the nearest high school was at Santa Paula.

By 1891, a number of nice houses had been built in Bardsdale, surrounded with thriving trees and shrubs, and all was supplied with a good system of water works. Surdam died on September 2 of that year and was buried in Bardsdale Cemetery. Most of his land holdings in the Bardsdale tract were sold to Thomas Bard by his estate. An article about Ventura County in the Los Angeles Times of September 5, 1891, reads:

"A few miles Farther west, Fillmore and Bardsdale, friendly rivals, greet each other from opposite slopes of the Santa Clara Valley. Either offers enough points of interest to occupy the whole of the space devoted to Ventura County.

From the former large quantities of brown stone are being constantly shipped to San Francisco and Los Angeles. Bardsdale has a splendid irrigation system, in fact, the best in the county. Large tracts of land are devoted to potatoes, which, with irrigation, will produce two crops a year, or one crop of potatoes and one of barley or beans may be raised. Land here is worth $140 to $200 per acre, but fine inducements are offered to settlers. One-half of a fifty-acre tract will be given to any one planting the same to oranges and caring for it for three years. The low price of potatoes this year left many farmers in the hole here."

A new Bardsdale Post Office was built in 1892. The tiny wooden structure, about 10 square feet (0.93 m^{2}), was said to be one of the smallest post offices in the state. That same year, the Bardsdale Methodist Church was founded. The Bardsdale Cemetery Association was founded on June 1, 1895, by the following shareholders, R.F. Robertson, Mary Phillips, Robert P. Strathearn, Martin Stoll, R.J. Ealy, A.S. Strobridge, J.D. LeBard, C.C. Elkins, Edward Meser, B.S. Clayton, C.J. Michel, F.G. Hutchinson and E. Robert Dunn. An article about Ventura County in the Los Angeles Herald of September 26, 1897, reads:

"On Friday last Frank Byers of Bardsdale was thrown from a wagon and instantly killed on the main street of that town. On examination it was found that his neck was broken, and the wheel had passed over his body in the region of the heart. The deceased leaves a widow and three children, mother, brother and sister. His widow and youngest child are in the east, and were expected back about the last of this month."

In 1898, the Methodists had a new Carpenter Gothic church and parsonage built at the southeast corner of Bardsdale Avenue and Ventura Street, near Robertson's Store, on two lots donated by Thomas Bard. When the 1900 census was enumerated, Bardsdale was included in Santa Paula Township, which extended to the east past Piru and Rancho Camulos. Operation of the Bardsdale Post Office was discontinued on May 15, 1906. In 1909, the first truss bridge was built across the Santa Clara River between Bardsdale and Fillmore. It was washed out in the winter flood of 1914.

The Bardsdale Cemetery was operated by the association until July 20, 1914, when it became the Bardsdale Cemetery District, being operated under the California Health and Safety Code. Another bridge was built across the Santa Clara and an article in the Los Angeles Times of March 23, 1915, reads:

"With the completion of the new Bardsdale bridge, taking the place of one washed out a year ago, a new highway beautiful will be added to the county's road system.

The County Forester has outlined plans for the planting of palms on both sides of the road from Bardsdale to the bridge, joining another palm-shaded highway. Citizens of Bardsdale and vicinity have co-operated in the work of grading and improving the highway, and all brush and weeds have been cleared from the sides."

In 1918, the schoolhouse was replaced with a new one on the same lot. The new school had a central hallway, an office, auditorium with stage, a kitchen and three classrooms, one for 1st and 2nd grades, one for 3rd and 4th and one for 5th and 6th. The second Bardsdale Bridge was washed out in the early morning of March 13, 1928, when the St. Francis Dam, in northern Los Angeles County, collapsed and a flood wave of water went rushing down the Santa Clara River Valley to the Pacific Ocean at Ventura. Among the estimated near 600 people who lost their lives in the disaster, only a few of the victims lived at Bardsdale. Unlike many of the affected areas, the town had received sufficient warning and most all who were in danger were able to move to safety. The body of Harold Kelly was found on the morning of April 6, 1928. Construction of a new Bardsdale Bridge was completed by Los Angeles contractor Claude Fisher. The trusses of this bridge were eventually painted dark green.

The nearby 18-hole Elkins Ranch Golf Course, where Bellevue Avenue veers north and becomes Chambersburg Road (Highway 23), was opened for public play in 1962. Bardsdale Elementary School, at 1098 Ventura Street, was in operation until the end of the 1965/1966 school year. After summer vacation, students were transferred to Fillmore schools. The Bardsdale School was a drug rehab facility for a while in the early 1970s, and later became a private home. The small 1892 post office stood on private property in Bardsdale until 1982. It was then donated to the Fillmore Historical Museum and moved to the north dock of the museum, which was then inside the old Fillmore Station depot. In 1994, Caltrans replaced the 66-year-old green truss bridge with a wider, modern concrete Bardsdale Bridge.

In February 1997, the Bardsdale Post Office was moved with the Fillmore Station to the property of the Fillmore Historical Museum and Park on Main Street in Fillmore.

== Major highways ==
- California State Route 23 (Chambersburg Road/Bellevue Avenue)
