= Wysong =

Wysong is a surname. Notable people with the name include:

- Biff Wysong (1905–1951), American baseball pitcher
- David Wysong (born 1949), American politician
- Dudley Wysong (1939–98), American golfer
- James Wysong, American flight attendant and author
- William S. Wysong (1876-1963), American politician
