= Fillmore Herald =

- Type: Semi-weekly newspaper
- Founder: H.G. Comfort
- Founded: 1907
- Ceased publication: 2006
- Language: English
- Headquarters: Fillmore, California

The Fillmore Herald was a newspaper serving the Fillmore, California community. Central to the life of the area even before the city's 1914 incorporation. It ceased publication in 2006.

== History ==
In 1907, the Fillmore Herald was founded. It was edited by H.G. Comfort. The Herald attracted immediate local attention, with the Oxnard Courier noting it as one of the county's best papers, which "looks on the bright side of things and has something to say."

In February 1911, William E. Wagener became co-owner. In June 1911, Comfort disposed of his half-interest to Cal F. Hoffman. In July 1920, Hoffman sold out to Tobias Larson, and Hoffman then took charge of the Moorpark Enterprise. In April 1933, Larson was bought out by Wagener. In August 1925, Wagener leased the Herald to R.E. Smith. Wagener was in poor health and planned to go on vacation for a year.

in July 1936, Wagener sold the paper to Hamilton V.B. Riggs. In May 1965, business manager Brice Van Horn acquired the paper from Riggs. At that time it was the last weekly newspapers published in Ventura County. In November 1970, Van Horn retired and was succeeded as publisher by his son John L. Van Horn. The Herald was acquired by 30-year-old Frank Stephens in April 1974, husband-and-wife Clifford W. Cox and Betty Cox in July 1978, and Ted Emory and Bruce Wright in February 1982. Douglas Gordon Huff bought the Herald in 1987.

In 1988, managing editor Sam Ramirez, who was Hispanic, filed a formal complaint alleging a sheriff's deputy of discrimination after he was asked to leave a city's employee's desk at city hall. After the incident, the city council voted 3–2 to approve a new policy requiring anyone who wants to go into city areas to be accompanied by a city employee or city officer. Around that time Huff, who previously was a registered sex offender, wrote an editorial in support of city manager who resigned after three female city employees accused him of sexual harassment. Huff urged the three women to resign.

The 1994 Los Angeles earthquake damaged the Herald's building, forcing staff to work out of Huff's home. The paper sold a record 6,000 copies of the issue following the earthquake, when it typically sold around 3,000. In April 1998, a jury convicted Huff of giving a group of teenage boys Marijuana and alcohol at parties hosted at his house. In May 1998, Huff died of Pancreatic cancer at age 52. At that time his brother David Huff took over the paper. The Herald announced plans to close but was saved by local investors. One businessman offered for the paper to move into his office building, rent free. At that time the county had four weekly papers.

In 2006, owners Linda Roberts and Terry Timmons closed the paper due to legal problems. This left the Fillmore Gazette as the town's only paper At the time of closing, the Herald was one of Ventura County's oldest papers.
