= Ojai Valley Inn =

Historic hotel in Ojai, California

- Interactive map of the Ojai Valley Inn area
- Hotel chain: Preferred Hotels & Resorts

General information
- Location: Ojai, California, U.S.
- Coordinates: 34.4378°N 119.2551°W
- Opening: 1934
- Owner: Jim and Paula Crown

Design and construction
- Architects: Wallace Neff (clubhouse); Austen Pierpont (inn); David Bury (Spa Ojai)
- Developer: Edward Libbey

Other information
- Number of rooms: 218
- Facilities: Golf course; Spa Ojai; tennis; conference center; Casa Elar residence

Website
- www.ojaivalleyinn.com

The Ojai Valley Inn, also known as the Ojai Valley Inn and Spa, is a 220-acre resort and golf course (89 ha) in Ojai, California. The golf course was developed in 1923, and the inn began in the 1930s. The property has undergone multiple renovations and expansions over the years, including the addition of the Spa Ojai in 1997.

== Early years ==
In 1923, glass industrialist and Ojai developer Edward Libbey built a golf course on the site. The golf course, known until the 1940s as the Ojai Valley Country Club, was laid out by noted golf course designer, George C. Thomas Jr. Libbey reportedly gave Thomas complete freedom in designing the course, telling Thomas: "Go ahead and build me the finest course that can be built on my property and use whatever land you wish. Give me the best. Money will be no object."

The golf course, situated in the Ojai Valley, offers views of the Upon its completion, the course was hailed as the prettiest in Southern California. The Los Angeles Times later wrote that the course, with its brooks and ancient oak trees, "was designed to look as if it had been there forever."

The clubhouse, surrounded by oak trees, was designed by architect Wallace Neff in Spanish Colonial style.

In 1934, the country club was expanded to add an inn. The new two-story building was designed by Austen Pierpont and was connected to the clubhouse by an enclosed glass passageway.

== Wartime use by military ==
During World War II, the property was taken over by the military. Early in the war, it was used as an Army camp with barracks built on the golf course. In 1944, the Navy took over the property for overflow housing from the Port Hueneme Naval Base. The clubhouse and grounds were used by Navy personnel as officers' quarters and for Seabee units and parade grounds. The property was returned to the country club after the war. In April 1945, Bing Crosby and Bob Hope hosted a fundraiser at the property for the Navy Relief Welfare fund.

== Postwar development ==
In 1946 or 1947, the property was purchased for $250,000 by a syndicate led by hotelier Don Burger. Burger renamed the property as the Ojai Valley and began developing it as a resort. In 1947, he added a swimming pool and the first hotel unit of 50 rooms with large bedrooms, mattresses with 200 hand-tied muslin springs, and interior design by Barbara Barondess MacLean. The 18-hole golf course was also rebuilt to a length of 6,800 feet and addition of a reservoir water hazard.

== Modern development ==
In the mid-1980s, the property was purchased by Jim and Paula Crown, grandchildren of Henry Crown. Over the next three years, the new owners reportedly spent $35 million renovating the hotel, doubling the capacity to 218 guest rooms, adding a new swimming pool and conference center capable of seating 500 persons, expanding the resort's tennis and fitness facilities, and restoring the golf course. The property reopened following the renovation in 1988.

In 1997, the 31,000 square feet (2,900 m^{2}) Spa Ojai was added in a four-story Spanish Colonial Revival building with a 50-foot-high bell tower. The spa building was designed by architect David Bury. The property underwent a $90-million renovation ending from 2003 to 2006 that included the addition of Casa Elar, a five-bedroom residence offering "ultimate luxury and privacy."

In 2022 the inn is a member of the Historic Hotels of America, a program of the National Trust for Historic Preservation, and has been since 1991.

== In popular culture and celebrities ==
The property has been used as a shooting location for several films as follows:

- Lost Horizon (1937). Director Frank Capra used Ojai and the country club to depict Shangri-La.
- Pat and Mike (1952) starring Katharine Hepburn and Spencer Tracy, in a scene in which they argue over golf shots
- The Two Jakes (1990)

The property was also for many years a destination for Hollywood celebrities, including Clark Gable, Walt Disney, Lana Turner, Nancy and Ronald Reagan, Irene Dunne, Loretta Young, Zsa Zsa Gabor, Judy Garland, and Hoagy Carmichael.
