= Fillmore, California =

City in California, United States

- City
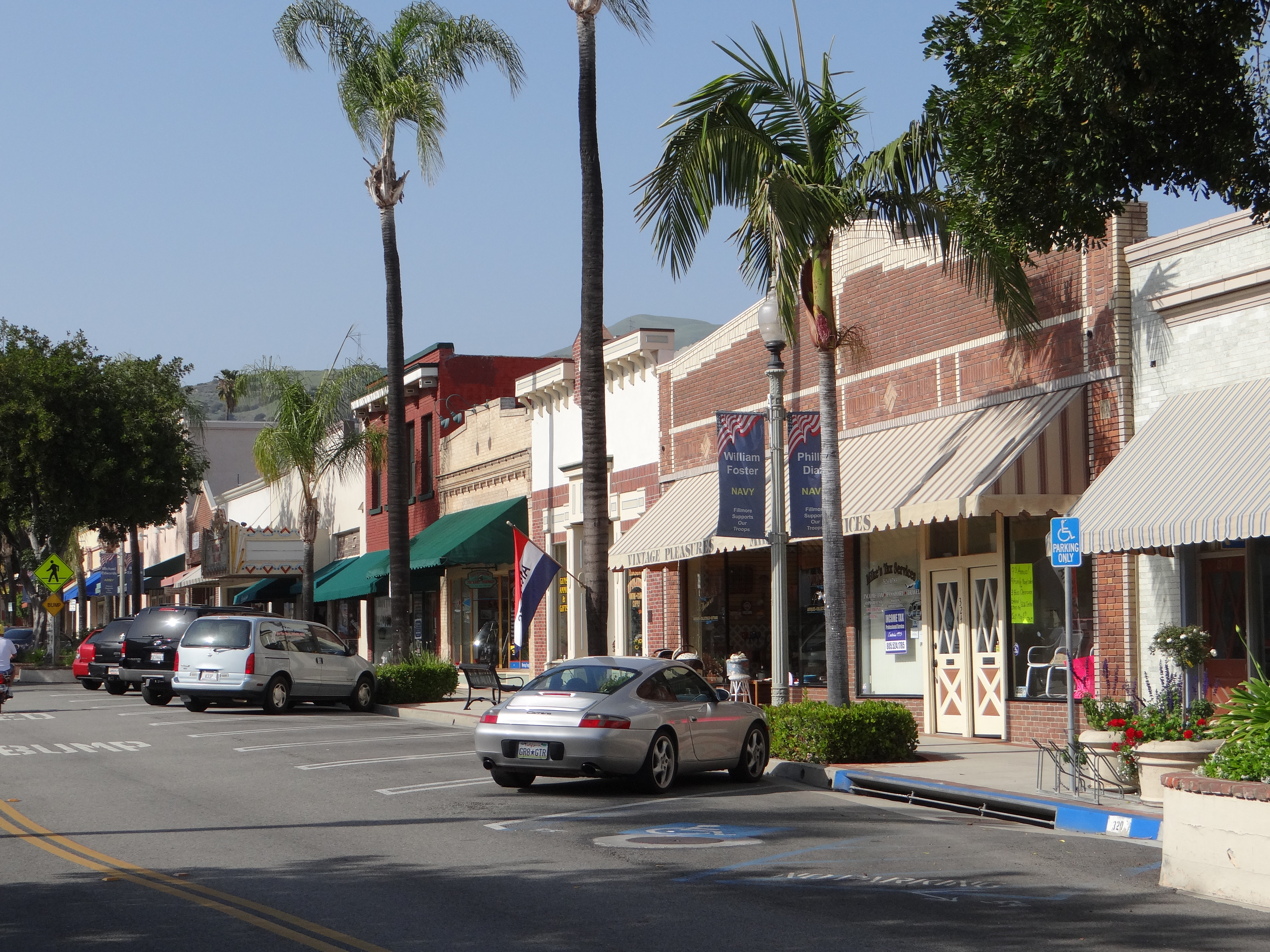
- Central Avenue in downtown Fillmore

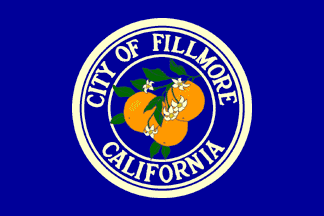
- Flag Seal
- Motto(s): The Last, Best Small Town
- Interactive map of Fillmore, California
- Location within California Location within the United States
- Coordinates: 34°24′5″N 118°55′4″W
- Country: United States
- State: California
- County: Ventura
- Incorporated: July 10, 1914

Government
  - Type: Council-Manager
  - City council: Mayor Christina Villaseñor; Mayor pro tem Albert Mendez; John Garnica; Carrie Broggie; Luis Rodriguez
  - City manager: Erika Herrera-Terriquez
  - State senator: Monique Limón (D)
  - Assemblymember: Steve Bennett (D)
  - U. S. rep.: Julia Brownley (D)

Area
  - Total: 3.30 sq mi (8.55 km^{2})
  - Land: 3.30 sq mi (8.55 km^{2})
  - Water: 0 sq mi (0.00 km^{2}) 0%
- Elevation: 456 ft (139 m)

Population (2020)
  - Total: 16,419
  - Density: 4,970/sq mi (1,920/km^{2})
- Time zone: UTC-08:00 (PST)
  - Summer (DST): UTC-07:00 (PDT)
- ZIP codes: 93015-93016
- Area code: 805
- FIPS code: 06-24092
- GNIS feature IDs: 1652710, 2410504
- Website: www.fillmoreca.com

Fillmore is a small city in Ventura County, California, United States, in the Santa Clara River Valley. In an agricultural area with rich, fertile soil, Fillmore has a historic downtown that was established when the Southern Pacific built the railroad through the valley in 1887. The rail line also provided a name for the town: J. A. Fillmore was a general superintendent for the company's Pacific system. The population was 16,419 at the 2020 census, up 9.4% from 15,002 during the 2010 census.

== History ==
In 1769, the Spanish Portola expedition, first Europeans to see inland areas of California, came down the valley from the previous night's encampment near today's Rancho Camulos and camped in the vicinity of Fillmore on August 11. Fray Juan Crespi, a Franciscan missionary travelling with the expedition, had previously named the valley Cañada de Santa Clara. He noted that the party travelled about 9–10 miles and camped near a large native village.

Founded in 1887 upon the arrival of the Southern Pacific Rail line, the city voted to incorporate in 1914, after a vigorous campaign by local business owners and the Fillmore Herald.

In 1985, the city council voted to make English the city's official language. The resolution was repealed in 1999.

At about 4:30am the morning of January 17, 1994, Fillmore sustained significant damage from the Northridge earthquake. It was the worst-hit community in Ventura County. No one in the community died or was injured, but over 200 buildings were damaged, including about one-fifth of the historical downtown that had been the center of numerous Hollywood films and TV shows. The quake caused an estimated $50 million in property damage and losses. Ultimately, 60 buildings needed to be torn down, and Fillmore rebuilt most of its downtown area.

== Geography ==
Fillmore sits at the foot of Topatopa Mountains in the Santa Clara River Valley, below San Cayetano peak in the Los Padres National Forest. The Sespe Condor Sanctuary, where the critically endangered California condor is recovering, lies in the Topatopa range to the north.

The town is famous for its many orange groves. Most houses are cottages, bungalows and old homes. Over half of all homes were constructed after 1970. The oldest buildings are found in downtown, which is centered around Central Avenue. Particularly the western part of the city has newer residential communities. Most businesses are located on Ventura Street (Highway 126).

The nearby Sespe Creek is a tributary of the Santa Clara River. Fillmore is within a historic Ventura County agricultural and tree-farming belt. According to the United States Census Bureau, the city has a total area of 3.3 square miles (8.5 km^{2}), all land.

=== Climate ===
This region experiences hot and dry summers. Temperatures can easily rise above 100 degrees. According to the Köppen Climate Classification system, Fillmore has a warm-summer Mediterranean climate, abbreviated "Csb" on climate maps.

Climate data for Fillmore, California
Month	Jan	Feb	Mar	Apr	May	Jun	Jul	Aug	Sep	Oct	Nov	Dec	Year
Record high °F (°C)	92 (33)	92 (33)	96 (36)	105 (41)	102 (39)	106 (41)	105 (41)	105 (41)	109 (43)	108 (42)	99 (37)	99 (37)	109 (43)
Mean daily maximum °F (°C)	69 (21)	69 (21)	71 (22)	74 (23)	75 (24)	77 (25)	81 (27)	83 (28)	82 (28)	79 (26)	74 (23)	69 (21)	75 (24)
Mean daily minimum °F (°C)	41 (5)	43 (6)	44 (7)	46 (8)	50 (10)	53 (12)	57 (14)	56 (13)	55 (13)	50 (10)	44 (7)	41 (5)	48 (9)
Record low °F (°C)	25 (−4)	26 (−3)	25 (−4)	30 (−1)	35 (2)	37 (3)	38 (3)	40 (4)	40 (4)	32 (0)	28 (−2)	25 (−4)	25 (−4)
Average precipitation inches (mm)	3.7 (94)	5.0 (130)	2.7 (69)	0.8 (20)	0.3 (7.6)	0.1 (2.5)	0.0 (0.0)	0.0 (0.0)	0.2 (5.1)	0.7 (18)	1.4 (36)	2.5 (64)	17.4 (446.2)
Source: The Weather Channel.

== Demographics ==
Historical population
Census	Pop.	Note	%±
1920	1,597		—
1930	2,893		81.2%
1940	3,252		12.4%
1950	3,884		19.4%
1960	4,808		23.8%
1970	6,285		30.7%
1980	9,602		52.8%
1990	11,992		24.9%
2000	13,643		13.8%
2010	15,002		10.0%
2020	16,419		9.4%
2024 (est.)	17,216	▲	4.9%
U.S. Decennial Census

=== 2020 census ===
As of the 2020 census, Fillmore had a population of 16,419, with a population density of 4,970.9 inhabitants per square mile (1,919.3/km^{2}). The median age was 34.6 years. 27.0% of residents were under the age of 18 and 12.3% of residents were 65 years of age or older. The age distribution was 9.9% aged 18 to 24, 27.5% aged 25 to 44, and 23.3% aged 45 to 64. For every 100 females there were 97.3 males, and for every 100 females age 18 and over there were 96.3 males age 18 and over.

The census reported that 99.2% of the population lived in households, 0.4% lived in non-institutionalized group quarters, and 0.4% were institutionalized. 99.8% of residents lived in urban areas, while 0.2% lived in rural areas.

There were 4,590 households in Fillmore, of which 47.6% had children under the age of 18 living in them. Of all households, 58.2% were married-couple households, 7.3% were cohabiting couple households, 13.3% were households with a male householder and no spouse or partner present, and 21.2% were households with a female householder and no spouse or partner present. About 14.4% of all households were made up of individuals and 7.7% had someone living alone who was 65 years of age or older. The average household size was 3.55. There were 3,729 families (81.2% of all households).

There were 4,762 housing units at an average density of 1,441.7 units per square mile (556.6 units/km^{2}), of which 4,590 (96.4%) were occupied. Of these, 66.1% were owner-occupied and 33.9% were occupied by renters. Overall, 3.6% of housing units were vacant. The homeowner vacancy rate was 1.1% and the rental vacancy rate was 2.6%.

Racial composition as of the 2020 census
Race	Number	Percent
White	5,537	33.7%
Black or African American	117	0.7%
American Indian and Alaska Native	392	2.4%
Asian	258	1.6%
Native Hawaiian and Other Pacific Islander	14	0.1%
Some other race	6,462	39.4%
Two or more races	3,639	22.2%
Hispanic or Latino (of any race)	12,593	76.7%

=== 2023 ACS 5-year estimates ===
In 2023, the US Census Bureau estimated that 21.4% of the population were foreign-born. Of all people aged 5 or older, 50.6% spoke only English at home, 48.4% spoke Spanish, 0.3% spoke other Indo-European languages, 0.7% spoke Asian or Pacific Islander languages, and 0.1% spoke other languages. Of those aged 25 or older, 78.4% were high school graduates and 15.3% had a bachelor's degree.

The median household income was $90,343, and the per capita income was $35,010. About 3.7% of families and 4.8% of the population were below the poverty line.

=== 2010 census ===
The 2010 United States census reported that Fillmore had a population of 15,002. The population density was 4,458.5 inhabitants per square mile (1,721.4/km^{2}). The racial makeup of Fillmore was 8,581 (57.2%) White, 75 (0.5%) African American, 180 (1.2%) Native American, 155 (1.0%) Asian, 12 (0.1%) Pacific Islander, 5,204 (34.7%) from other races, and 795 (5.3%) from two or more races. Hispanic or Latino of any race were 11,212 persons (74.7%).

The Census reported that 14,836 people (98.9% of the population) lived in households, 83 (0.6%) lived in non-institutionalized group quarters, and 83 (0.6%) were institutionalized.

There were 4,156 households, out of which 2,053 (49.4%) had children under the age of 18 living in them, 2,483 (59.7%) were opposite-sex married couples living together, 569 (13.7%) had a female householder with no husband present. 312 (7.5%) had a male householder with no wife present. There were 259 (6.2%) unmarried opposite-sex partnerships, and 34 (0.8%) same-sex married couples or partnerships. 642 households (15.4%) were made up of individuals, and 299 (7.2%) had someone living alone who was 65 years of age or older. The average household size was 3.57. There were 3,364 families (80.9% of all households); the average family size was 3.92.

The population was spread out, with 4,534 people (30.2%) under the age of 18, 1,555 people (10.4%) aged 18 to 24, 4,141 people (27.6%) aged 25 to 44, 3,221 people (21.5%) aged 45 to 64, and 1,551 people (10.3%) who were 65 years of age or older. The median age was 31.9 years. For every 100 females, there were 99.8 males. For every 100 females age 18 and over, there were 98.9 males.

There were 4,408 housing units at an average density of 1,310.0 units per square mile (505.8 units/km^{2}), of which 2,674 (64.3%) were owner-occupied, and 1,482 (35.7%) were occupied by renters. The homeowner vacancy rate was 3.0%; the rental vacancy rate was 4.5%. 9,324 people (62.2% of the population) lived in owner-occupied housing units and 5,512 people (36.7%) lived in rental housing units.

== Economy ==
Fillmore's economy is still largely driven by agriculture. Most agricultural industry in the Fillmore area is related to orange, lemon, avocado orchard farming and packing and, more recently, specimen tree farming. To a lesser extent, row crop farming and small industry and assembly are also present in and near Fillmore and in other parts of the Santa Clara River Valley. The single largest employer is the Fillmore Unified School District.

In 2014, a plan was presented for a business park on the old Chevron refinery property east of Fillmore.

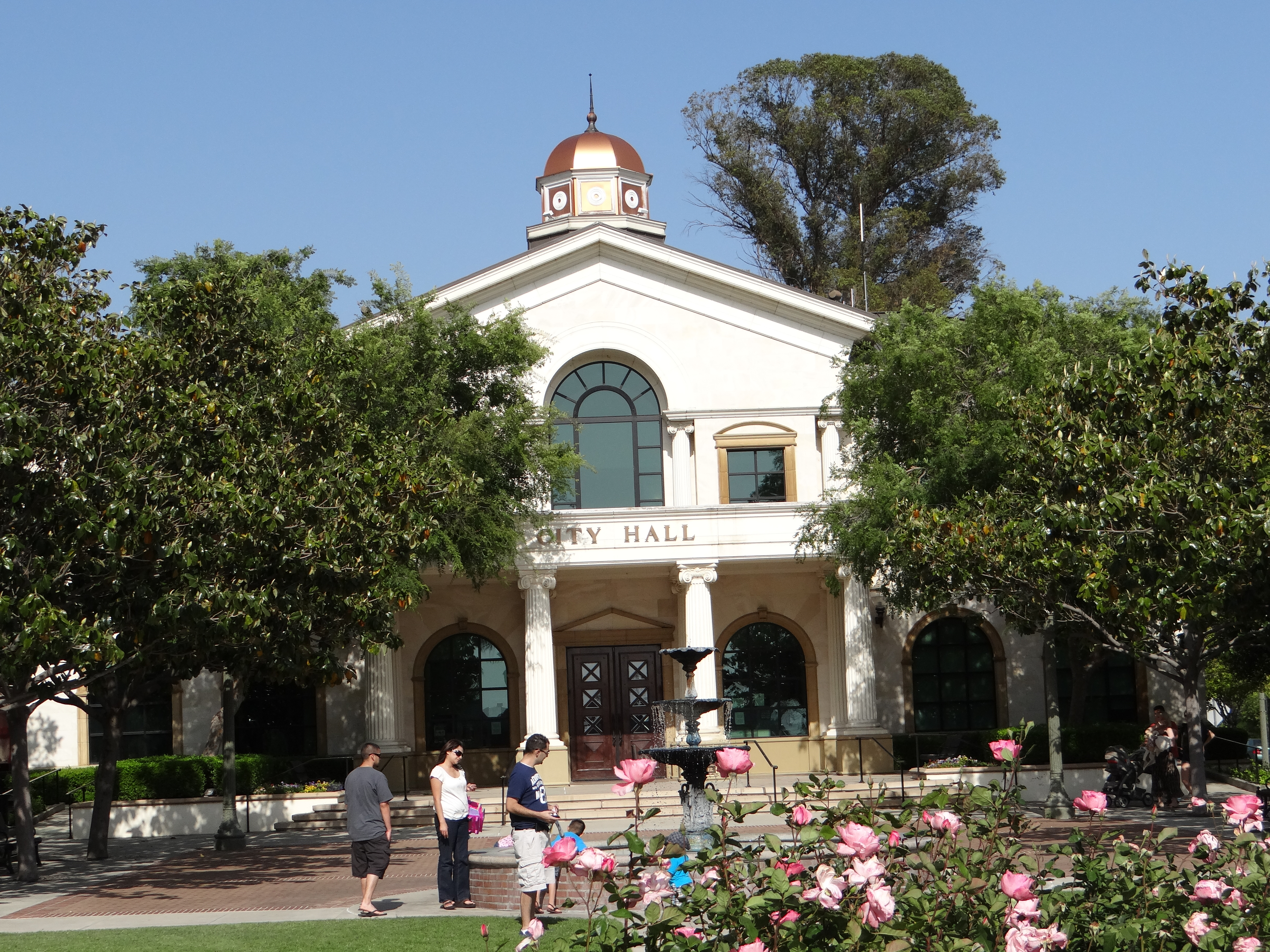
Fillmore City Hall, April 2012

=== Tourism ===
Fillmore has turn of the 20th century downtown architecture, the one-screen Fillmore Towne Theatre, and many unique shops and businesses. Adjacent to the railroad tracks and city hall is the Railroad Visitor Center operated by the Santa Clara River Valley Railroad Historical Society, which has many displays as well as a fully operational 90-foot (27 m) train turntable and several restored railroad cars.

The Fillmore Historical Museum includes the restored Southern Pacific Railroad Fillmore station standard-design One Story Combination Depot No. 11 built in 1887, a 1956 Southern Pacific railroad caboose, and railroad-related displays. The Fillmore and Western Railway trains took tourists through the orchards for thirty years until it ceased operations in 2021. The small post office from the community of Bardsdale and a 1919 farm worker bunkhouse from Rancho Sespe were moved to the site along with the 1905 Craftsman-style Hinckley House, the home of the community's first dentist and druggist. The bunkhouse contains many displays illustrating the history of Fillmore and the nearby communities of Bardsdale and Piru.

Located nearby are the Fillmore fish hatchery and the Sespe Creek and Sespe Wilderness, home to the California condor Sespe sanctuary.

== Government ==
The City of Fillmore is an established municipality within Ventura County, founded in 1888 and incorporated on July 10, 1914. The city is governed by a five-person council with the position of mayor and mayor pro-tem elected by the council every two years. Council members serve four-year terms.

== Public safety ==
=== Law enforcement ===
In 1987, the City of Fillmore contracted with the Ventura County Sheriff's Department to provide protection for Fillmore, Bardsdale and Piru, an area with over 450 square miles (1,200 km^{2}). Fillmore's Police Department is headed by Sheriff's Capt. Dave Wareham, 5 Patrol Sergeants, 2 Detectives, 35 regular deputies, 1 cadet and 1 dispatcher. Fillmore is also served by three Sheriff's Store Front Locations, a Juvenile Liaison Program with the School District, Citizens Patrol Disaster Response Team, Fillmore Mountain Search and Rescue Team and Citizens Patrol.

The Fillmore Police Department has a Bike Patrol Unit, which consists of eight specially trained deputies. The Bike Patrol is utilized for proactive patrols, civic events, enforcement of public nuisance crimes, and other team operations. Each year the Santa Clara Valley Station offers a Bike Rodeo for the youth in the community.

Also, the Fillmore Station is home to a Special Enforcement Detail that provides a variety of specialized duties including gang enforcement, tagging/graffiti investigations, and alcohol beverage control. This unit is utilized for any specific crime concerns that are beyond the scope of normal patrol resources.

In August 2001, the City of Fillmore introduced its first traffic enforcement motorcycle, a BMW bike, which was purchased with technology grant funds from the State. The motor officer's primary duty is to enforce traffic laws within the city and to investigate traffic accidents that occur within the city limits. The officer is trained in accident reconstruction, skid marks analysis, and accident investigation.*

=== Fire department ===
The Fillmore Fire Department provides fire protection and emergency medical services at the advanced life support (ALS) level. The department is staffed with a combination of career and volunteer staff. American Medical Response (AMR) is the primary paramedic ambulance provider for the city while the Ventura County Fire Department provides 9-1-1 dispatching and telecommunication service.

=== Crime ===
Fillmore crime statistics report an overall downward trend in crime based on data from 21 years with violent crime decreasing and property crime decreasing. Based on this trend, the crime rate in Fillmore for 2024 is expected to be lower than in 2019.

The city violent crime rate for Fillmore in 2019 was lower than the national violent crime rate average by 66.87% and the city property crime rate in Fillmore was lower than the national property crime rate average by 63.36%.

In 2019 the city violent crime rate in Fillmore was lower than the violent crime rate in California by 71.51% and the city property crime rate in Fillmore was lower than the property crime rate in California by 66.84%.

== Education ==
The city is served by the Fillmore Unified School District. Educational facilities for the district include two high schools including, one middle school, and four elementary schools.

A fifth elementary school is located in the town of Piru, which is also a part of the school district. The Fillmore Christian Academy is a private K-8 school in town.

=== Elementary schools ===
- San Cayetano Elementary School
- Rio Vista Elementary School
- Fillmore Christian Academy
- Mountain Vista Elementary School
- Rio Vista Elementary School

=== Junior high schools ===
- Fillmore Middle School

=== High schools ===
- Fillmore High School
- Sierra High School

== Infrastructure ==
=== Transportation ===
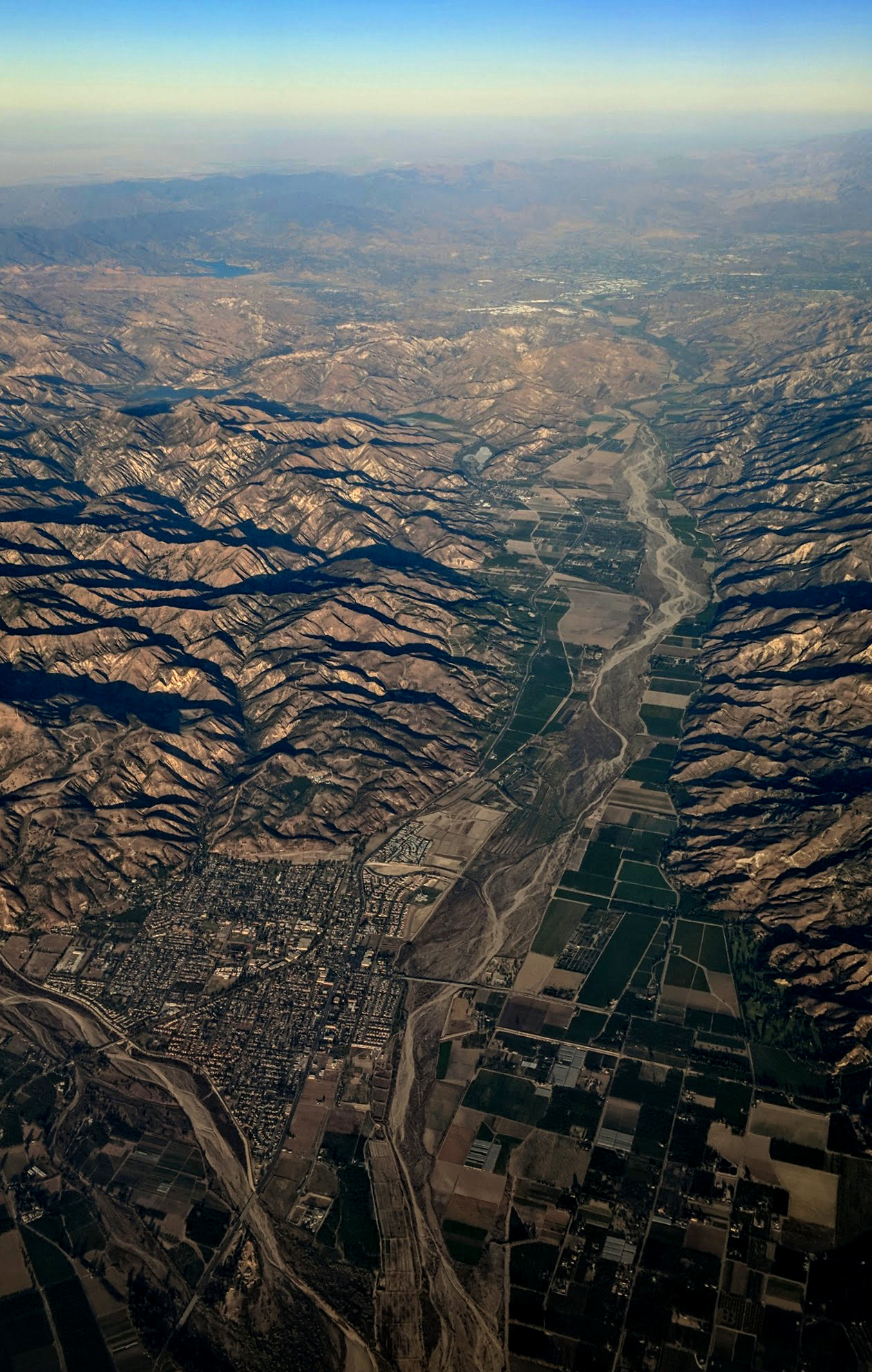
Late-afternoon aerial view of Fillmore (left foreground) and the Santa Clara River Valley. State route 126 runs along the valley, to Castaic Junction at the east end.

==== Major highways ====
Fillmore is primarily served by State Highways 126 and 23.

- California State Highway 126
- California State Highway 23

==== Transit ====
===== VCTC =====
Fillmore is at the east end of the Ventura Intercity Service Transit Authority Highway 126 route that originates at the Pacific View Mall in Ventura, and operates along SR 126 to Saticoy, Santa Paula and Fillmore.

===== Valley Express =====
Fillmore will have its first regularly scheduled bus service. Fillmore will have a single bus on a 30-minute loop throughout the city, and one route running between Fillmore and Piru. Both city bus systems will connect to the regional Highway 126 bus to Ventura, with free, timed transfers.

Scheduled service began in 2015 for the Heritage Valley communities with two routes in Santa Paula, one route in Fillmore and one in Piru that runs to Fillmore. They are designed to mesh with the schedule of the VISTA Highway 126 route. 16-seat buses are used on the Valley Express. The dial-a-ride services in both cities, which for now are the only public transit option, will remain in operation after the bus routes start.

=== Wastewater treatment ===
Veolia North America operates the City of Fillmore Wastewater Treatment Plant.

== Notable people ==
- Nati Cano (1933–2014), mariachi musician, former leader of Mariachi los Camperos
- Chad Hansen, NFL wide receiver for three teams

== In popular culture ==
While Rancho Camulos appears in the film Ramona (1910), Fillmore's State Fish Hatchery is featured in Susanna Pass (1949).

Movies shot in Fillmore include Almost An Angel and Hit and Run.

La Bamba was partially filmed in Fillmore. The old run-down house can be found in North Fillmore.

Well-preserved downtown Fillmore is a popular filming location for television and movies. The January 4, 2007, episode of CSI entitled Leaving Las Vegas prominently featured old-town Fillmore as the fictional town of "Larkston, Nevada". Scenes in the television series Jericho and Big Love are also filmed there.

The town of Paleto Bay in Grand Theft Auto V is based on Fillmore.

Fillmore was featured by Huell Howser in Road Trip Episode 102.

*NSYNC Recorded the Train scene in the music video of Bye Bye Bye in Fillmore.

== See also ==
- Historical Sycamore Tree
- Historical Bardsdale United Methodist Church
