= Fillmore Towne Theatre =

- The Barnes Theatre 1916-1926; The Stearns Theatre 1926-1931; The Fillmore Theatre 1931-1971; The Fillmore Towne Theatre 1971-1994
- Interactive map of Fillmore Towne Theatre
- Address: 338 Central Avenue; Fillmore, California
- Coordinates: 34°23′59.65″N 118°54′48″W
- Capacity: 325
- Screen: 1
- Current use: Community theater, music concerts, arts education and film festivals

Construction
- Opened: October 2, 1916
- Rebuilt: 1996
- Years active: 1916-1994

Website
- mudturtletheatrical.org

Fillmore Towne Theatre is a former vaudeville and movie theater in Fillmore, California and is a landmark in downtown. Built in 1916, the single-screen theater showed silent films.

== History ==
The single-screen theater was used to show silent films and the stage area was used for vaudeville. Mary Pickford performed here.

Built in 1916, the Fillmore Towne Theatre has gone through numerous owners as well as several names. Previously known as Barnes, Stearns, Fillmore, this theater has gone through two fires and an earthquake.

After the 1994 Northridge earthquake, the City of Fillmore purchased the building. Through extensive fund raising by citizens in the Save the Towne Theatre Committee, as well as federal and state grants, such as those given by the State Historic Preservation Office, the theatre was restored. After the restoration (costing in excess of $1 million), it reopened in 1996, showing the latest movies. The theatre stopped showing feature films in April 2011 as the city budget could no longer make up the shortfall.

In 2021, the theater was purchased by Mudturtle Theatrical, Inc. Mudturtle intends to restore the theater to make it a venue for "building community through the arts".

== Structure ==
This single-screen theater was renovated in 1994, with new seats and carpet, as well as a live stage in order to restore its vaudeville roots. It has a total of 333 seats on the main floor. The balcony is closed.
