= Bardsdale United Methodist Church =

Historic church in California, United States

- Bardsdale Methodist Episcopal Church
- U.S. National Register of Historic Places
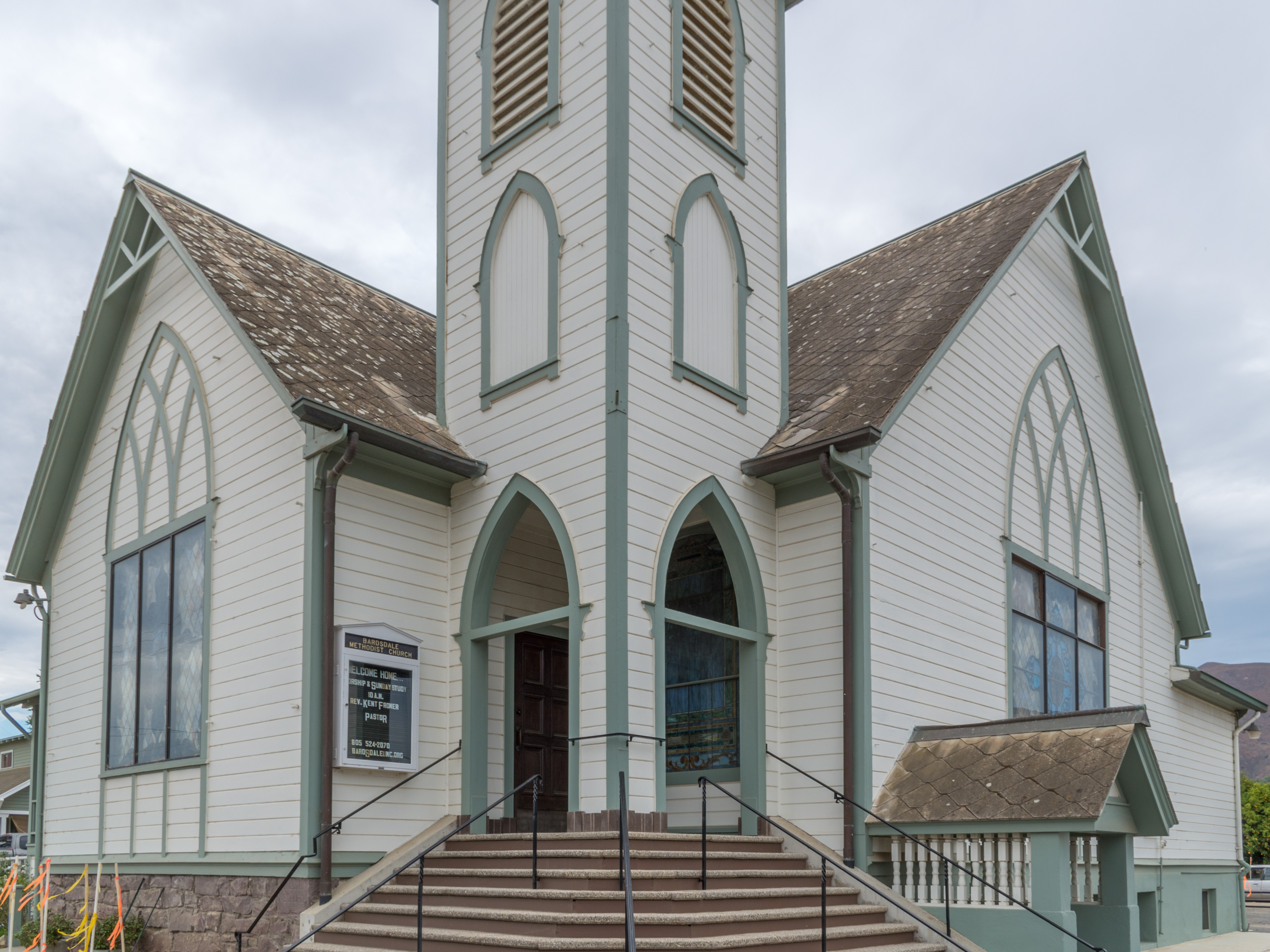

- Location within California
- Location: 1498 Bardsdale Ave., Bardsdale, California
- Coordinates: 34°22′17″N 118°55′59″W
- Built: 1898
- Architectural style: Gothic Revival
- NRHP reference No.: 86001986
- Added to NRHP: August 28, 1986

Bardsdale United Methodist Church is a historic church located at 1498 Bardsdale Avenue in the unincorporated community of Bardsdale, California, in Ventura County. It is south of the Santa Clara River approximately 3 miles (5 km) from Fillmore.

Built in 1898, as Bardsdale Methodist Episcopal Church, this carpenter Gothic structure with a 60 ft (18 m) bell tower and high-peaked arches has long been a center of community life in Bardsdale. The town's namesake, Thomas R. Bard, donated the land for construction of the church and parsonage. He also donated funds to help purchase two large stained glass windows installed in the north and west walls.

When the church opened, in April 1898, the Los Angeles Times reported on its dedication:

"The Bardsdale Methodist Episcopal Church was dedicated last Sunday by Dr. G.W. White of Los Angeles. The building cost $2550, will seat 350 persons, and has a fine basement fitted for social gatherings. There was $550 remaining due on the building, which was subscribed Sunday morning."

On April 23, 1968, the Methodist Church was merged with the Evangelical United Brethren Church to form the United Methodist Church. The name was then changed to Bardsdale United Methodist Church.

A portion of the ceiling fell on a parishioner during a service in 1982, leading to an extensive renovation. The renovation and restoration work included materials purchased from a church in Los Angeles that had closed in 1982. The materials salvaged from that church included stained-glass windows, an oak chancel, chandeliers, pews, marble facing around the interior doors, a hand-carved pulpit, lectern and communion rail.

The church also features a Schoenstein pipe organ that was purchased in 1986, with $60,000 donated by parishioners. In a tradition dating back to the mid-1960s, the Bardsdale Chancel Choir performs a free holiday vesper program during the Christmas season.

The Ventura County Cultural Heritage Board designated the clapboard church County Landmark #50 in 1979, calling it "the only example of carpenter Gothic in the Fillmore-Bardsdale area." The Gothic church was added to the National Register of Historic Places in 1986.

== See also ==
- National Register of Historic Places listings in Ventura County, California
- Ventura County Historic Landmarks & Points of Interest
- First Baptist Church of Ventura
