= Donna Steichen =

American journalist

Donna Steichen is a Roman Catholic author and journalist. Born in Wadena, Minnesota to Margaret (Corcoran) and Maurice Merrigan, she lived most of her life in St. Cloud, Minnesota, and later in Ojai, California. Doinna Steichen passed way on October 21, 2026.

In 1950, she married LeRoy Steichen, and they became the parents of four children.

Before becoming known for her writing, Steichen was a classroom teacher and religious educator, and was engaged in the pro-life movement from its inception. From 1980 to 1986, she served as vice-president and president, successively, of the Minnesota chapter of the Catholic League for Religious and Civil Rights.

Donna Steichen is best known to the general public for her best selling 1991 book Ungodly Rage: The Hidden Face of Catholic Feminism, a critical analysis of the impact of feminism on American Catholicism. During the 1980s, Donna Steichen, like others within the Catholic Church, became alarmed by the manner in which many Church employees, including women religious, were expressing ethical values contradictory to those incorporated in such encyclicals as Casti connubii (Chaste Marriage) and Humanae vitae (Of Human Life). In the turmoil following the Second Vatican Council, many were open to new ideas and seeking untraditional ways to live. Among the main sources of such unorthodox ideas were "New Theology", feminism and New Age neopaganism. In particular, Steichen focused on what she perceived to be linkages between feminism and wicca, or as she commonly refers to it in her book, "witchcraft."

In Ungodly Rage, Steichen argued extremely forcefully that these views were contrary to revealed doctrine and that the dissenters were actually practicing a completely different religion from that taught by the Church. She contended that these heretical notions had been permitted to gain a foothold in American Catholic institutions by the US hierarchy, which was unwilling or excessively slow to investigate those responsible.

The book, her first, was a success. It turned Steichen, who had been writing for a long time in small Catholic journals, into a significant figure in the move to restore orthodoxy within the Church. She became a noted figure on the lecture circuit in North America, England, Ireland, Europe, Australia, New Zealand and the Philippines. Some have even claimed Steichen as an influence on Pope John Paul II and Pope Benedict XVI.

== Other writings ==
Before Ungodly Rage, Steichen published a thirty-five page pamphlet titled "Population control goes to school" in 1988.

Since the publication of Ungodly Rage, Donna Steichen has edited a second book titled Prodigal Daughters: Catholic Women Come Home to the Church, published in 1998. In this book, Steichen helps document seventeen baby boomer women who were brought up Roman Catholic but gave up their faith, only to return later in their lives.

Though well received, the book was not as controversial as Ungodly Rage, but in the 2000s, Steichen acquired a higher profile with writings in better-known journals such as Catholic World News, Latin Mass, LifeSite, Voices and Touchstone Magazine. Her most recent book is Chosen: How Christ Sent Twenty-Three Surprised Converts to Replant His Vineyard, published by Ignatius Press in September 2009.

== Criticism ==
Some, like Elizabeth Knuth, have criticized Steichen and her book Ungodly Rage on the grounds that many of her sources are unreliable, that she misquotes Christian and pagan feminists, and vastly misinterprets the sources and its authors. More basic inaccuracies are also present throughout the book like how Steichen provides incorrect page numbers and book titles of some of her sources.
