= R. G. Surdam =

American businessman

R.G. Surdam
- Born: August 11, 1835; Dutchess County, New York, US
- Died: September 2, 1891 (aged 56); Ventura County, California, US
- Occupation: Real estate agent/developer

Royce Gaylord Surdam (August 11, 1835 – September 2, 1891) was an American businessman, real estate agent and developer. He did a lot to build up Ventura County, California, and was the founder of the towns of Nordhoff, which was later renamed Ojai, and Bardsdale. Surdam never married, was a Royal Arch Mason and a staunch Republican.

== Biography ==
He was born in Dutchess County, New York, the eldest of four children of Lewis L. Surdam (c. 1810-1878) and Julia Lockwood (c. 1813-?). His siblings were Cynthia Surdam (c. 1843-?); Julia A. Surdam (1844-1931); and George L. Surdam (1847-1931).

His parents were both born in Connecticut. The family moved to Illinois, where they lived in LaSalle County when the 1850 census was enumerated.

Surdam moved to California in 1854. For 10 years he worked in gold mining in various regions of the state. When the 1860 census was enumerated, he was a miner in Plumas County.

In 1864, Surdam went from San Francisco to Los Angeles, ill with bilious fever. A doctor sent him to the care of the Sisters of Charity, who nursed him back to health. He had charge of the gold mines on Santa Catalina Island in 1865, and was also active in entertaining visitors to the island and showing them points of interest.

In 1866, Surdam moved to San Buenaventura, which was at that time in Santa Barbara County. Surdam built a warehouse and handled grain and oil for 10 years. When the 1870 census was enumerated he lived at Ventura and his occupation was recorded as real estate agent.

On August 4, 1871, the Board of Supervisors granted the request of Thomas R. Bard and Surdam to build a wharf at Hueneme. Ventura County was officially formed on January 1, 1873, bringing a great deal of change to the area. Surdam purchased 1,700 acres (7 km^{2}) of land in the Ojai Valley, in 1874, and laid out the town of Nordhoff. He built the hotel and donated 20 acres (80,937 m^{2}) for public use, and it soon became a noted sanatorium. When he named the town for writer Charles Nordhoff, Surdam received a letter from Nordhoff thanking him for the honor and speaking in the highest terms of the climate and picturesque location. The name of the town was changed from Nordhoff to Ojai in 1917.

In the 1875 Ventura County Directory, Surdam lived in Ventura and his occupation was listed as oil superintendent. He initiated the annual Ventura County Fair when he sponsored the celebration at Ventura in 1877. He lived at Saticoy when the 1880 census was enumerated and his occupation was listed as real estate agent.

In 1887, Surdam founded Bardsdale on 1,500 acres (6 km^{2}) of land he purchased from Thomas Bard, who he named the town in honor of. The U.S. Post Office Department established the Bardsdale Post Office on May 18, 1887, and Surdam was appointed the first postmaster. He lived in Bardsdale, in 1891, and was manager of the whole property, which he termed his pet tract.

R.G. Surdam died at age 56 from an accidental overdose of laudanum, which was self-administered, reportedly to calm his nerves after a drinking binge. He is interred in the older section of Bardsdale Cemetery, where his tall upright gravestone stands under a large cypress tree. The inscription on the stone reads, "Living, he made the poor man's heart be glad, and at his death, the sorrowing ones more sad." The words are attributed to Thomas Bard.
