= James Wysong =

American author

- Education: University of West London
- Occupation: Flight attendant
- Writing career
- Subject: Travel

James Wysong is an American author who worked as a flight attendant with for a major air carrier for almost 18 years, and wrote about air travel under the pen name A. Frank Steward. He is a travel columnist for MSNBC.

The New York Times described Wysong's pen name as "wryly chosen."

== Personal life ==
Wysong was raised in Ojai, California, the youngest of three children. In 1984 he joined the Army as a trumpet player based in Germany. The band toured Europe, “playing everything from nightclubs to opening ceremonies, but 75% of our performances were at German beer festivals.”

In 1987 he left the military and went to college in California. Fluent in the German language, Wysong joined Pan American Airlines in 1989. He was based in London, England, where he met his wife, Antonia, who is also employed by the airlines, starting as a flight attendant and later as a pilot. Wysong completed his degree in computer science from Thames Valley University in England. After Pan Am went out of business, he proceeded to work for the airline that took over Pan Am's flight routes, and he finally returned to the United States' East Coast in 1999. He and Antonia had a baby boy named Oliver James Wysong on February 2, 2006.

== Writing career ==
Wysong a.k.a. A. Frank Steward continues to fly and write about his experiences in-flight. He has a weekly column at Tripso.com and [MSNBC.com]. He has flown over 6 million miles, encountered over half a million passengers, endured over 1,000 different delays and cancellations, argued with over 500 frequent flyers, and has flown to approximately 100 countries.

His hobbies include people watching, traveling, writing, chess, running, and lucid dreaming. He has completed a novel and a screenplay about a young man's adventures through lucid dreaming titled Dream Weaver, and is currently writing another novel/screenplay titled Shady Acres.

Authors who influenced him in his budding writing career include Jack London and Robert Fulghum, who taught him that “you have to live life in order to write about life.” His favorite quote is from Jack London: “I would rather be a superb meteor, every atom of me in magnificent glow, than a sleepy and permanent planet. The proper function of man is to live, not to exist. I shall not waste my days in trying to prolong them. I shall use my time.”

According to USA Today and The Globe and Mail, Wysong's first book, The Air Traveler's Survival Guide, was not widely reviewed because it was published in September 2001 when news media focused on the 9/11 attacks to the exclusion of other types of coverage.

== Books ==
- The Air Traveler's Survival Guide (2001) (ISBN 1-57023-242-3)
- The Plane Truth: Shift Happens at 35,000 Feet (2003) (ISBN 1-57023-211-3)
- Air Travel Tales from the Flight Crew (2005) (ISBN 1-57023-242-3)
- More Air Travel Tips and Tales From the Flight Crew (2008)
