= Ojai, California =

City in California, United States

- City
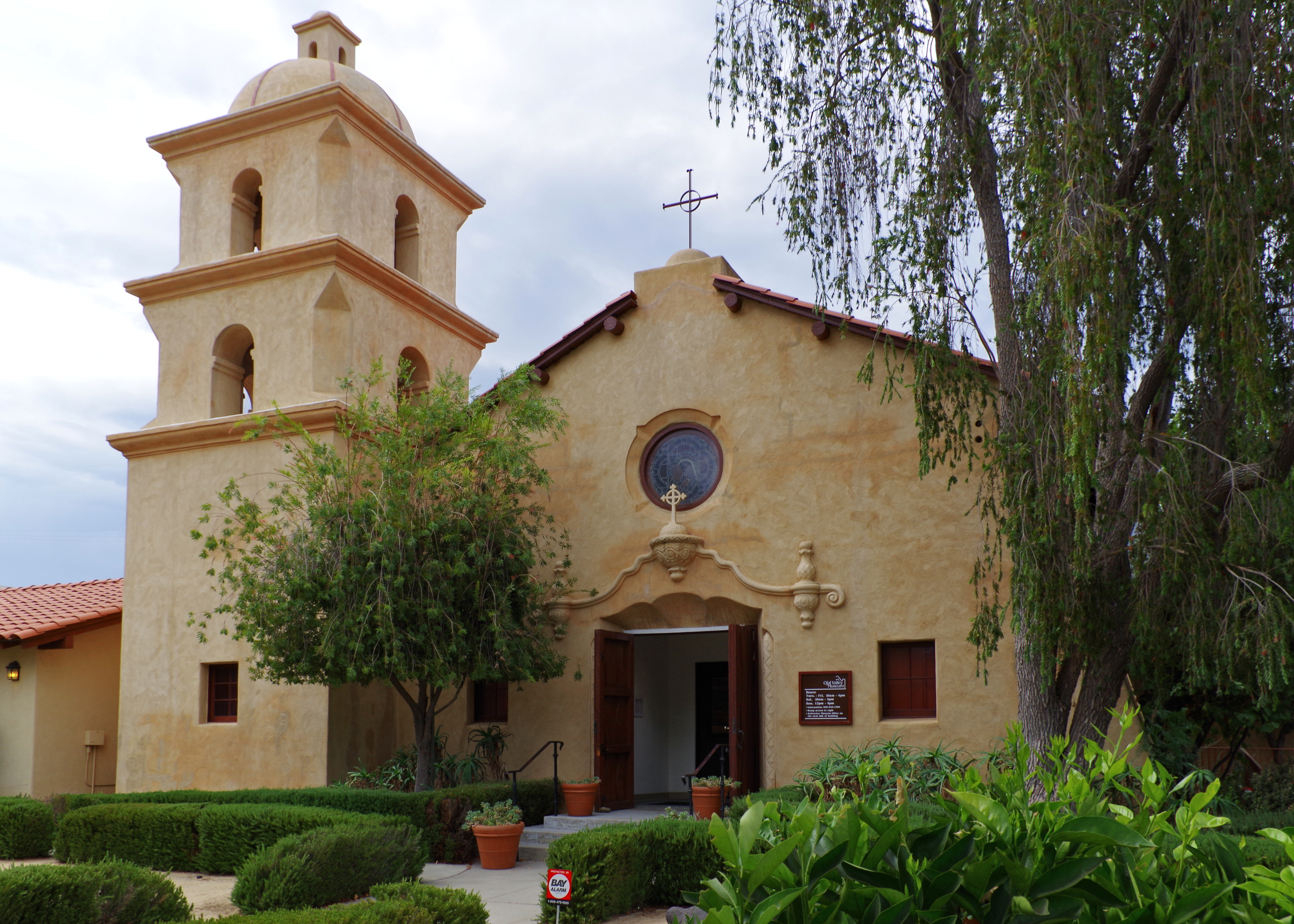
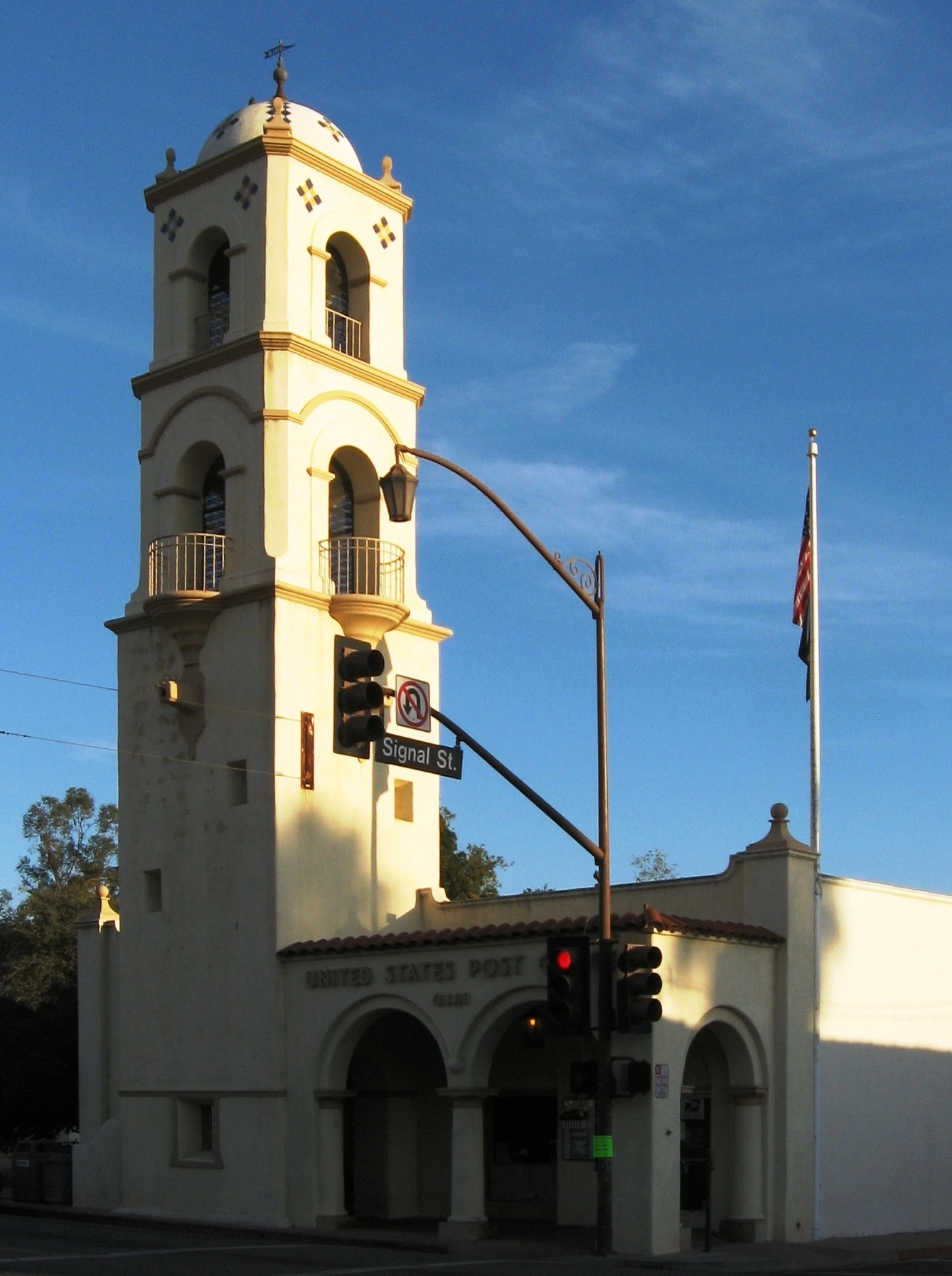
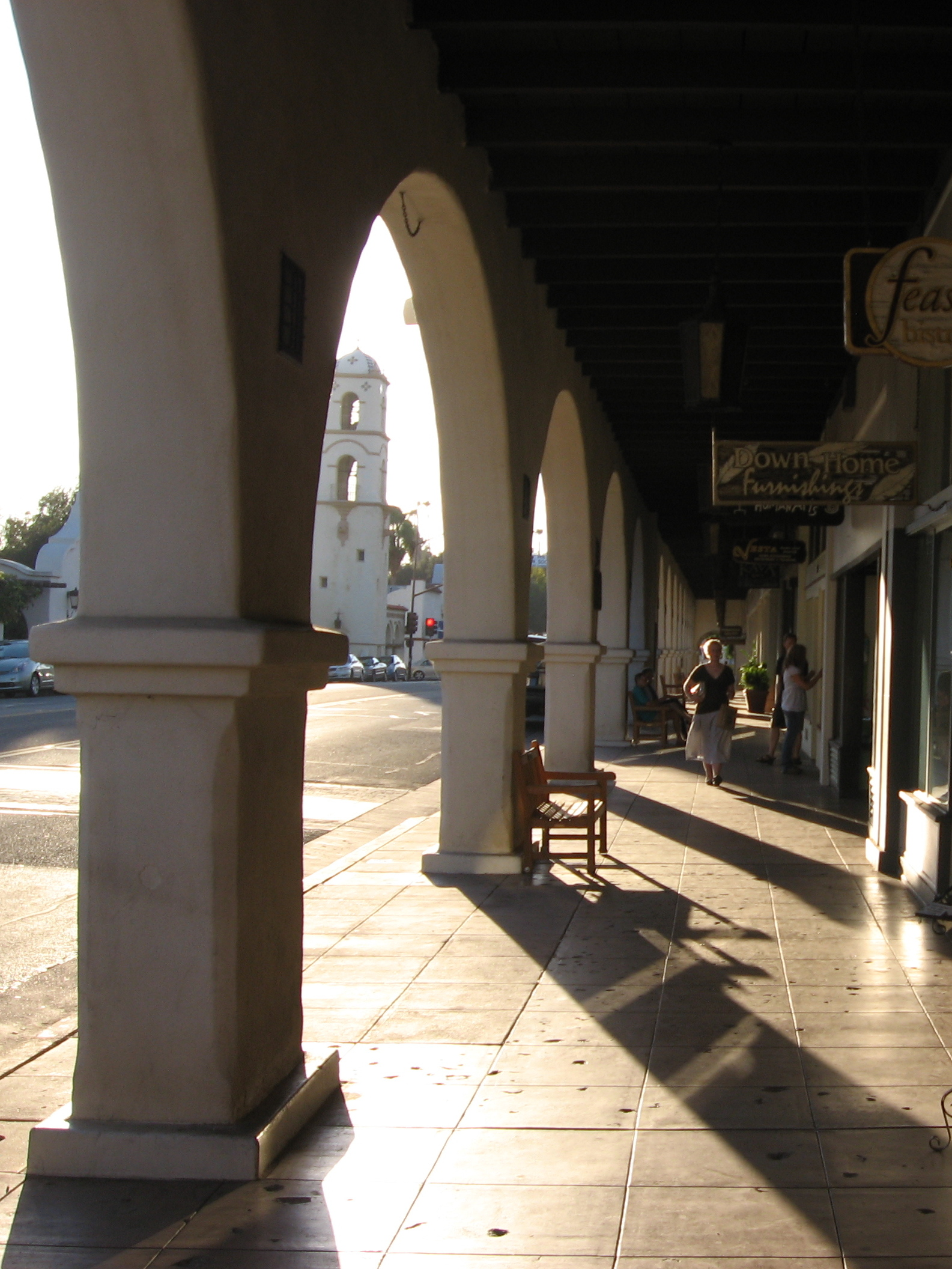
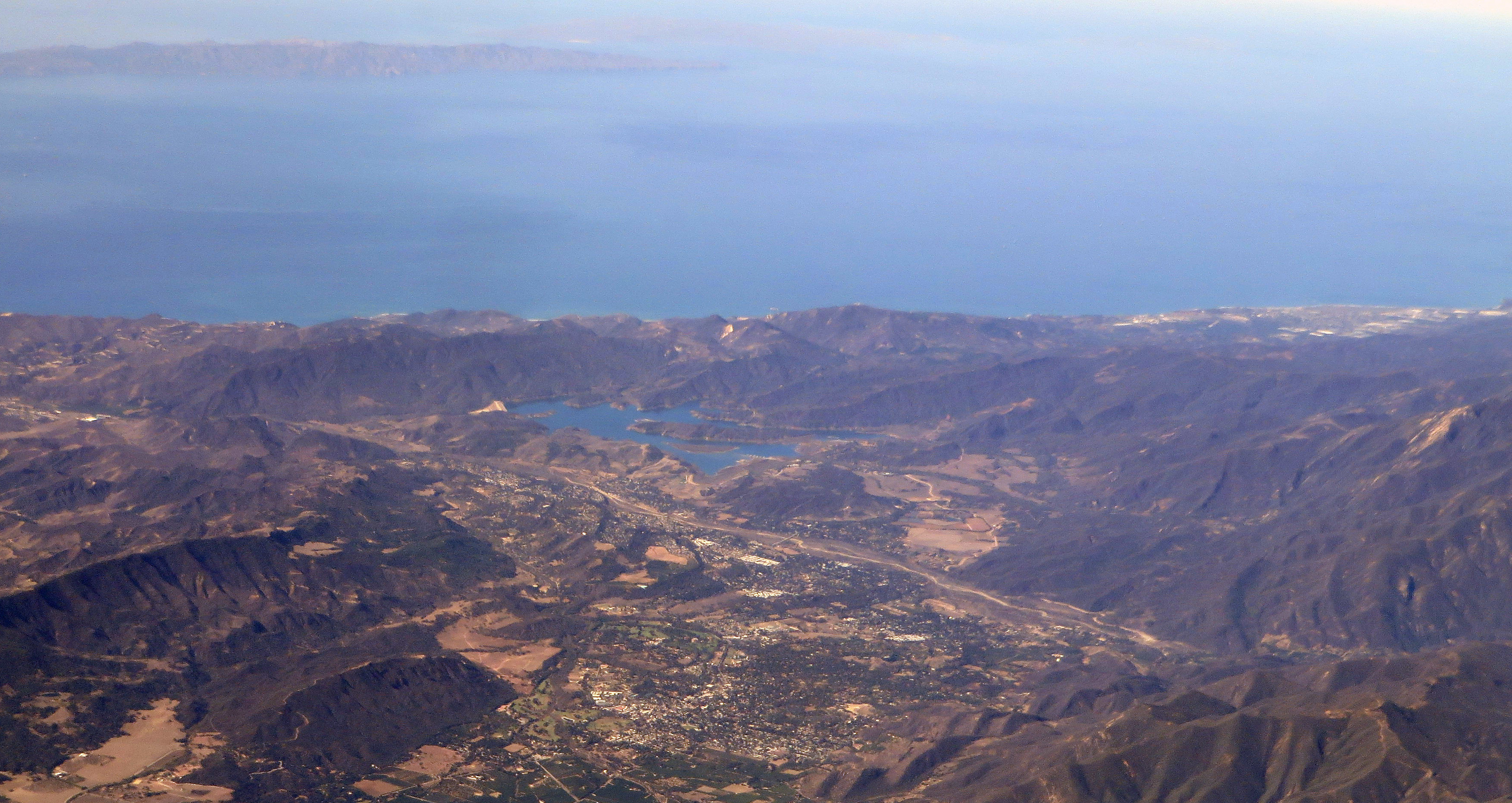
- Top to bottom, left to right: Ojai Valley Museum; U.S. Post Office; Ojai Arcade; aerial view of Ojai

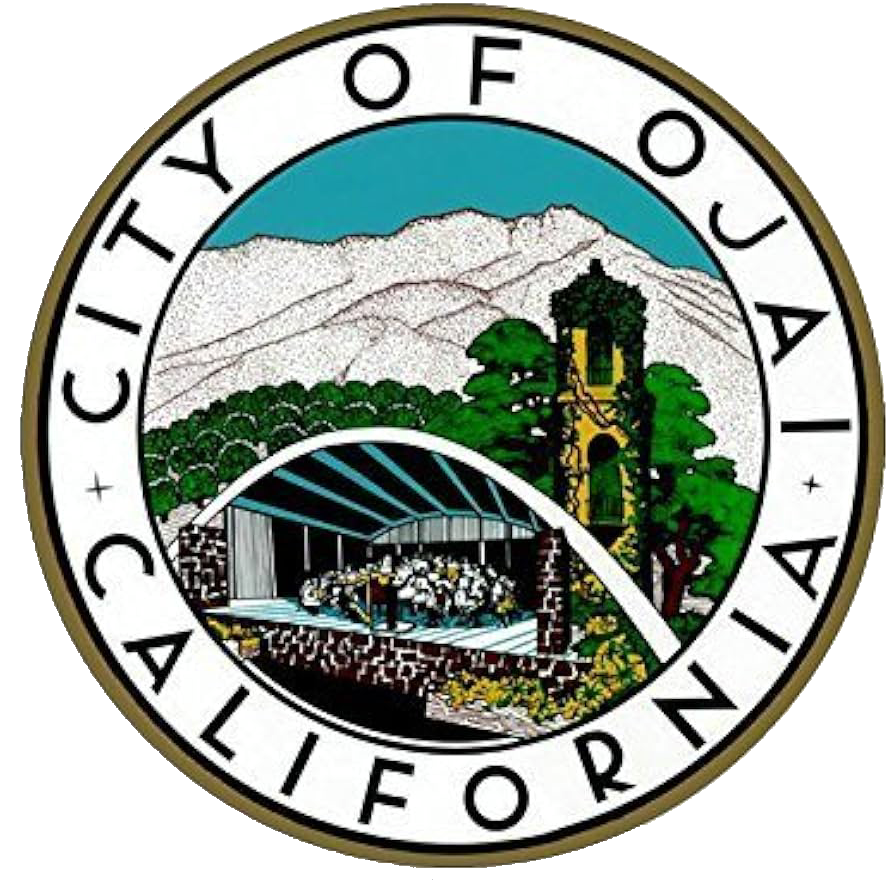
- Flag Seal
- Interactive map of Ojai, California
- Location of Ojai in Southern California Location of Ojai in California Location of Ojai in the United States
- Coordinates: 34°26′57″N 119°14′48″W
- Country: United States
- State: California
- County: Ventura
- Incorporated: August 5, 1921
- Named for: Ventureño: ’Awhay̓ ("Moon")

Government
  - Type: City Council—City Manager
  - Mayor At Large: Andy Gilman (Term: 2024 to 2026)
  - Mayor Pro Tempore District 4: Kim Wang (Term: 2024 to 2028)
  - Councilmember District 1: Leslie Rule (Term: 2022 to 2026)
  - Councilmember District 2: Rachel Lang (Term: 2022 to 2026)
  - Councilmember District 3: Andrew Whitman (Term: 2022 to 2026)

Area
  - Total: 4.37 sq mi (11.32 km^{2})
  - Land: 4.36 sq mi (11.28 km^{2})
  - Water: 0.015 sq mi (0.04 km^{2}) 0.35%
- Elevation: 745 ft (227 m)

Population (2020)
  - Total: 7,637
  - Density: 1,754/sq mi (677.0/km^{2})
- Time zone: UTC−8 (Pacific)
  - Summer (DST): UTC−7 (PDT)
- ZIP Codes: 93023 & 93024
- Area code: 805
- FIPS code: 06-53476
- GNIS feature IDs: 1652763, 2411308
- Website: ojaicity.org

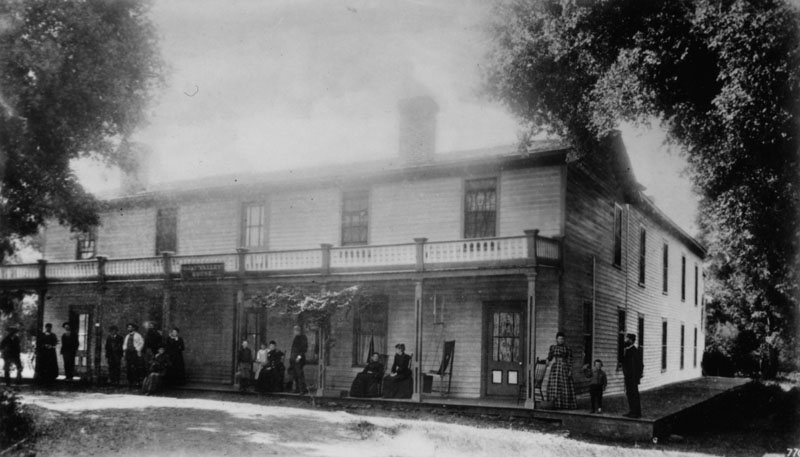
Ojai Inn, built in 1876; photo taken in 1880s

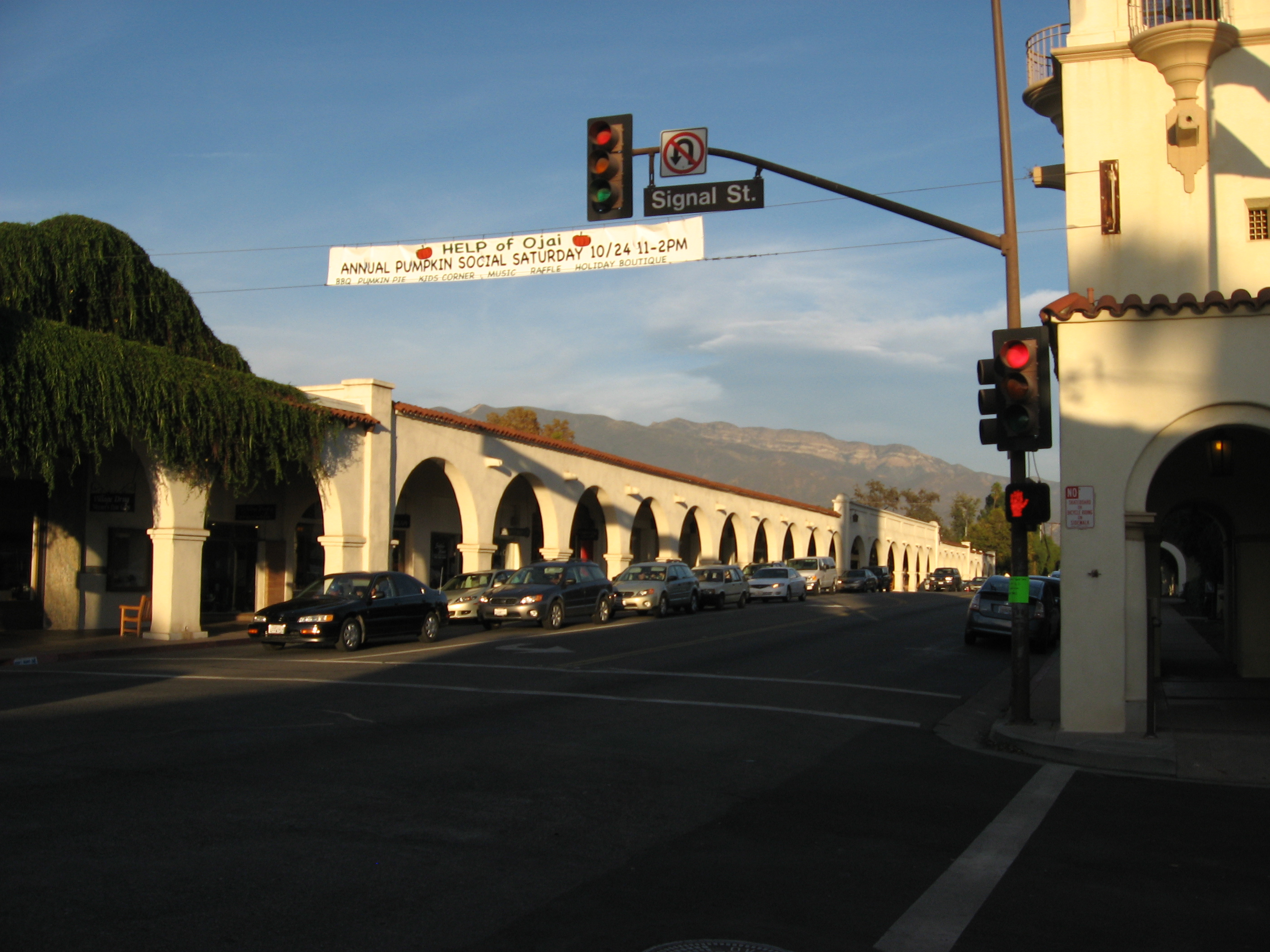
Ojai Arcade, built in 1917 in the Spanish Colonial Revival style; post office tower at right

Ojai (/ˈoʊhaɪ/ OH-hy; Ventureño: ’Awhay̓) is a city in Ventura County, California, United States. Located in the Ojai Valley, it is northwest of Los Angeles and east of Santa Barbara. The valley is part of the east–west trending Western Transverse Ranges and is about 10 miles (16 km) long by 3 miles (5 km) wide and divided into a lower and an upper valley, each of similar size, surrounded by hills and mountains. To the north, the Ojai Valley is bordered by the Los Padres National Forest.

The population was 7,637 at the 2020 census, up from 7,461 at the 2010 census.

Ojai is known for its boutique hotels, recreation opportunities, hiking, and farmers' market of local organic agriculture. It has small businesses specializing in local and ecologically friendly art, design, and home improvement. Chain stores are prohibited by city ordinance to encourage local small business development and retain the town's character.

The name Ojai is derived from the Mexican-era Rancho Ojai, which in turn took its name from the Ventureño Chumash word ’awhay̓, meaning "Moon". The city's self-styled nickname is "Shangri-La" referencing the natural environment of this health and spirituality-focused region as well as the mystical sanctuary of the 1937 film adaptation of James Hilton's novel Lost Horizon.

== History ==
=== Chumash ===
Ojai sits on what used to be a territory of the Chumash, a Native American people who inhabited the central and southern coastal regions of California, but what is now Morro Bay in the north to Malibu in the south and the Channel Islands. Before the arrival of European settlers, at least 10,000 Chumash people lived in over 150 independent villages, speaking variations of the same language. Starting in 1769, Spanish soldiers and missionaries arrived to colonize the California coast, Christianize the native population, found military presidios and relocate Chumash people from their villages into Spanish missions.

Due to violence and imported disease, Chumash people died at devastating rates under Spanish rule. According to George Tinker, a Native Scholar, “The Native American population of coastal population was reduced by some 90 percent during seventy years under the sole proprietorship of Serra’s mission system.” The Chumash population had declined to about 200 by the year 1900 due to a combination of disease and violence, sometimes controversially called the California Genocide. Current estimates of Chumash population today range from 2,000 to 5,000.

The name Ojai is derived from the Ventureño Chumash word ʼawhay̓, meaning "moon." A 1905 book on place names in the United States records the name Ojai as being derived from an Indigenous word meaning "nest", though the specific Indigenous language is not identified.

=== Rancho Ojai ===
In 1837, Fernando Tico, a Santa Barbara businessman, received the 17,716-acre Rancho Ojai Mexican land grant, which included both the lower and upper Ojai valleys. Tico operated a cattle ranch on the land and moved his large family to an adobe in the lower valley. Tico sold the entire Rancho Ojai in 1853. The rancho changed hands several more times before it was purchased in 1864 by Thomas A. Scott, a Pennsylvania oil and railroad baron. The petroleum exploration of the Ojai Basin was the result of a report of oil seeps (oil springs) along the Sulphur Mountain area. In 1866, Scott's nephew Thomas Bard used a steam-powered cable-tool drilling rig on the north side of Sulphur Mountain. On May 29, 1867, Ojai No. 6 produced an oil gusher, at a depth of 550 feet, and the Ojai Field eventually produced 10-20 barrels of oil a day. Also in 1866, Leland Stanford's brother Josiah dug oil tunnels on the south side of Sulphur Mountain, producing 20 barrels a day for the Stanford Brothers refinery in San Francisco. For economic reasons, falling oil prices at the end of the Civil War and cheaper imports from the east, Scott and Stanford ceased oil exploration in the valley area. Thomas Bard then began selling the surface rights to parcels of Rancho Ojai in late 1867. As the president of Unocal, Bard would return in the 1890s to dig about 50 oil tunnels into Sulphur Mountain, which produced until 1998.

=== Nordhoff ===
The town was laid out in 1874 by San Buenaventura businessman R.G. Surdam and named Nordhoff in honor of the writer Charles Nordhoff who had written a book about California titled, California for Health, Pleasure and Residence: A Book for Travelers and Settlers. Most early settlers to the valley had one or more family members who were ill, particularly with respiratory illnesses, and the Ojai Valley developed a reputation for having healthy air quality. Many did get well after moving to the valley. Charles Nordhoff had not visited the Ojai Valley when his book came out in 1873, but made several visits to his namesake town in the early 1880s, and he mentioned the Ojai Valley in the revised 1882 version of his popular book. The discovery of hot springs in Matilija Canyon and subsequent development of hot springs resorts in the late 1800s contributed to the valley's healing mystique.

The public junior high and high school in Ojai is Nordhoff Junior High and High School. The former public middle high school, named "Matilija", formerly served as Nordhoff Union High School and still features large tiles with the initials "NUHS" on the steps of the athletic field.

=== Railroad ===
The Ventura and Ojai Valley Railroad connected Ojai to the national rail network near Ventura station in 1898. The Southern Pacific Railroad acquired all the capital stock in the Ventura and Ojai Valley Railroad in April 1898. A nine-day Pineapple Express with rainfall intensity reaching 6.2 inches (16 cm) per day caused floods destroying the rail line in January 1969. The former rail line was converted to the Ojai Valley Trail in 1989.

=== Libbey ===
Nordhoff became a popular wintering spot for wealthy Easterners and Midwesterners. The elite Foothills Hotel, which catered to them, was built on a mountain overlooking the town in 1903. Visitors enjoyed dining, music concerts, horseback riding, and hunting and fishing trips into the back country. Some of these businessmen built homes in the valley and contributed to the community's development. Among these winter visitors were Edward Drummond Libbey and his wife Florence. Their first winter in Ojai was in 1907. Libbey was the owner of the Libbey Glass Company of Toledo, Ohio. He fell in love with the valley, bought property in the Foothills tract in 1909, and built a Craftsman-style house designed by Myron Hunt and Elmer Grey.

Steeped in City Beautiful ideals, Libbey began thinking about what could be done to beautify the existing rustic town. He bought up all the properties on the south side of Ojai Avenue (where Libbey Park is today) and most of the buildings there were demolished. In 1916, he hired the architectural firm of Frank Mead and Richard Requa of San Diego to transform Nordhoff into the Spanish-style town center seen today. The project included a Mission-style arcade along the main street, a bell-tower reminiscent of the famous campanile of the Cathedral of the Virgin Mary of the Immaculate Conception in Havana, Cuba (also known as the Havana Cathedral), and a pergola with two arches opposite the arcade.

In March 1917, just after completion of the renovation project, the name of the town was changed to Ojai. The valley had always been known as "The Ojai". Leading up to and during World War I, American sentiment became increasingly anti-German. Across the United States, German and German-sounding place names were changed. Some Ojai writers in the past have speculated that anti-German sentiment contributed to the name change of Nordhoff to Ojai in 1917. There is no clear evidence that this was the case for the name change in Ojai.

To thank Libbey for his gifts to the town, the citizens proposed a celebration in the new Civic Center Park (later changed to Libbey Park) that they wished to call "Libbey Day," but Libbey suggested "Ojai Day" instead. The first Ojai Day took place April 7, 1917. Ojai Day was celebrated each year until 1928. Local schoolteacher Craig Walker revived Ojai Day in 1991 and it has been celebrated since. The Ojai Day celebration takes place in October.

In 1917 two fires struck the community. The first started in Matilija Canyon on June 16 and burned 60 buildings in its path, including many homes and the Foothills Hotel. The newly Spanish-style structures in the downtown were not affected. On November 28, 1917, a fire started in a gasoline stove in a store in the Arcade and the stores in the western half of the Arcade burned down. Part of the Arcade suffered smoke damage but did not burn down. A new Spanish-style Foothills Hotel was built in 1919–1920 to replace the one that burned down.

=== Housing ===
The Taormina neighborhood was established as the first historic district in the city in 2016. The housing development was built in the style of French architecture of Normandy in the 1960s and 1970s by members of the Theosophy movement adjacent to the Krotona Institute of Theosophy. Taormina's founder, theosophist Ruth Wilson, envisioned the development as a retirement community for fellow theosophists but in the early 1980s a court ruling required the community to be open to residents of all faiths and backgrounds. The majority of homes in the city were built between 1940 and 1980 with about a dozen mobile-home parks included in the housing stock. With rapid growth in the 1970s, a slow-growth ordinance was passed. From 2008 to 2018, there were no new multifamily developments with a single six residential unit apartment being built in 2019.

== Geography ==
Ojai is situated in a small east–west eponymous valley, north of Ventura and east of Santa Barbara. The city is approximately 745 feet (227 m) above sea level and borders the Los Padres National Forest to the north. It is approximately 15 miles (24 km) inland from the Pacific Ocean.

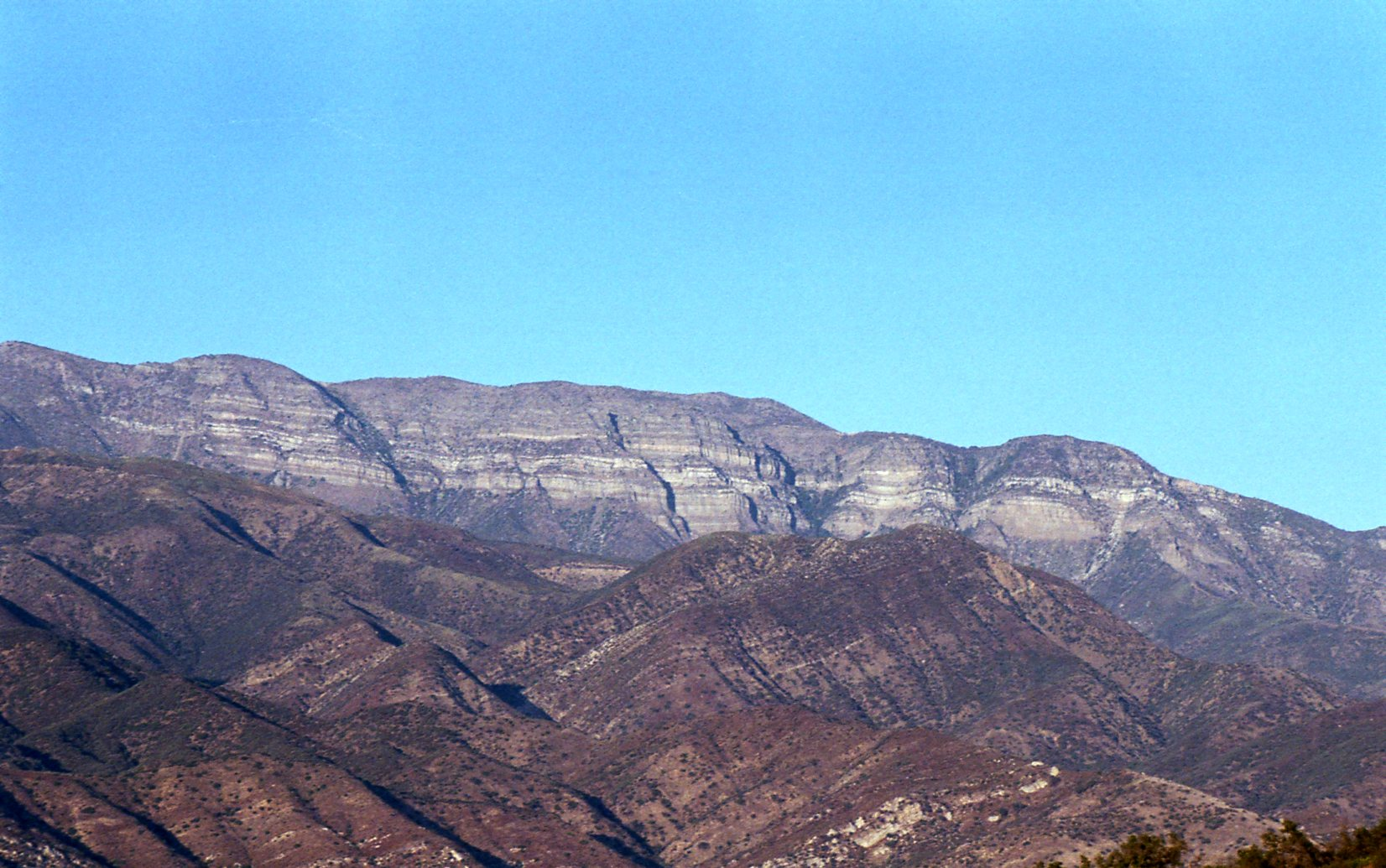
View of the Topatopa Mountains from Upper Ojai

The Ojai Valley lies within the Topatopa Mountains on the north and south and is actively shaped by a web of earthquake faults. The Sisar fault in the valley was the epicenter of a magnitude 5.1 earthquake on August 20, 2023. The Santa Ynez Mountains lie to the north, while Sulphur Mountain and the lower Black Mountain lie to the south. Nordhoff Ridge, the western extension of the Topatopa Mountains, towers over the north side of the valley at more than 5,000 feet (1,500 m). Sulphur Mountain creates the southern ranges bounding the Ojai Valley, a little under 3,000 feet (910 m) in elevation. The Sulphur and Topatopa mountains are part of the Transverse Ranges system. The Ojai Valley and the surrounding mountains are heavily wooded with oak trees.

The mountains to the west of the Ojai Valley are drained by the Coyote, Matilija and Santa Ana creeks. These empty into the Ventura River. The Matilija Dam, Casitas Dam and Lake Casitas Reservoir alter the historic drainage of these creeks and the river. The creeks that drain the mountains directly north of Ojai empty into San Antonio Creek, as does Lion Canyon Creek that lies between Black Mountain and Sulphur Mountain. San Antonio Creek drains into the Ventura River just north of Casitas Springs. The Ventura River flows through the Ventura River Valley and empties into the Pacific Ocean at the city of Ventura. The Ventura River was once known for its steelhead fishing before Matilija Dam and Lake Casitas were constructed, eliminating habitat for this trout species.

The eastern part of the Upper Ojai Valley is drained by the Sisar and Santa Paula creeks. These creeks flow into the Santa Clara River at Santa Paula. The high mountains above the Ojai Valley and further east are drained by Sespe Creek, which empties into the Santa Clara River at Fillmore. In 1991, 31.5 miles of the 55-mile-long Sespe Creek was given federal Wild & Scenic River status.

=== Climate ===
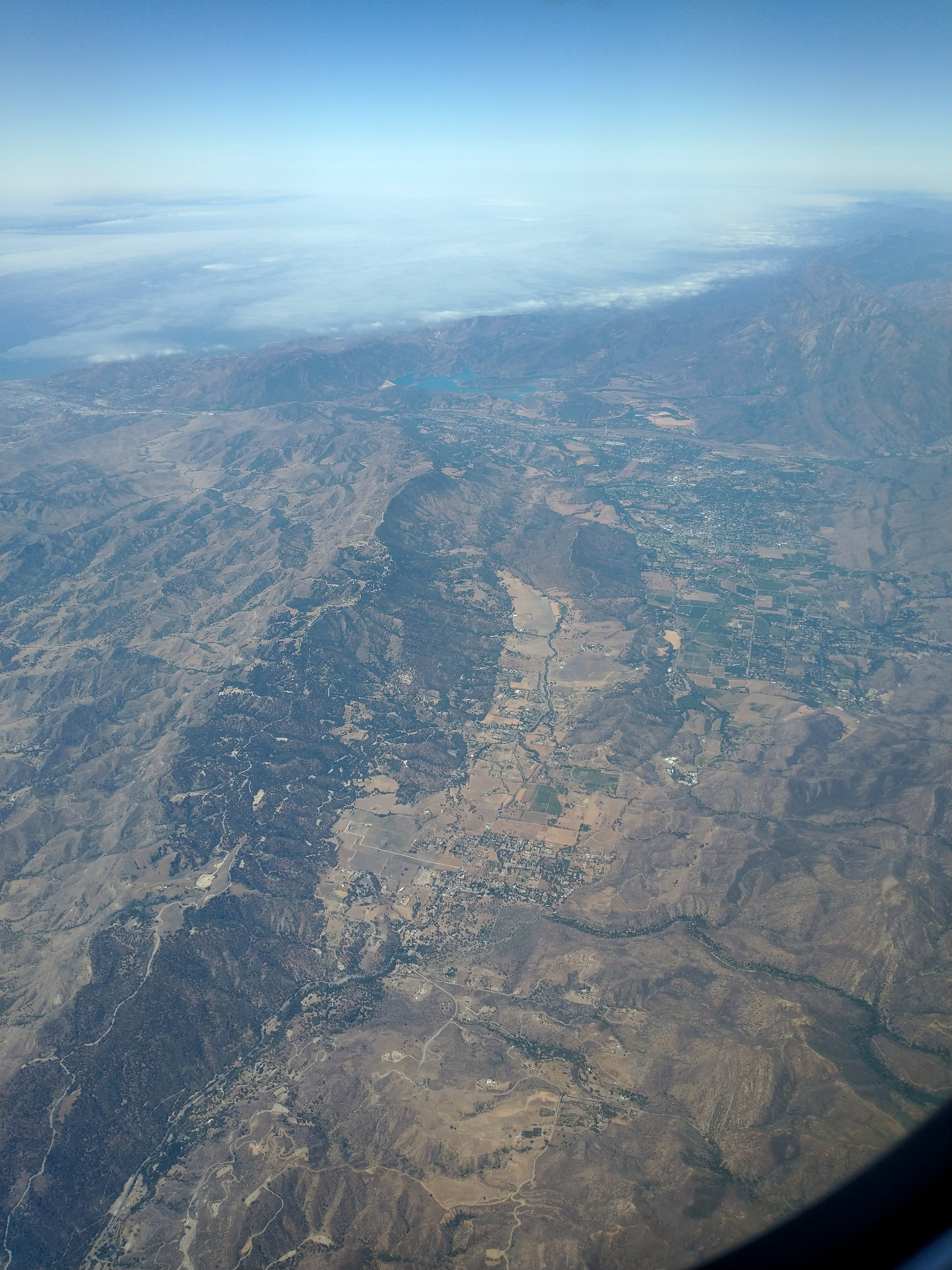
Aerial view of Ojai

The climate of Ojai is Mediterranean, characterized by hot, dry summers, at times exceeding 100 °F (37.8 °C), and mild, rainy winters, with lows at night falling below freezing at times. During dry spells with continental air, morning temperatures, due to Ojai's valley location, can drop well below most of Southern California, with the record being 13 °F (−10.6 °C) on January 6–7, 1913. In contrast, Ojai is far enough from the sea to minimize marine cooling, and very hot days can occur during summer, with the record being 119 °F (48.3 °C) on June 16, 1917 – when it fell as low as 65 °F (18.3 °C) in the morning due to clear skies and dry air.

As is typical for much of coastal Southern California, most precipitation falls in the form of rain between the months of October and April, with intervening dry summers. As with all of Southern California, rain falls on few days, but when it does rain it is often extremely heavy: the record being 9.05 inches (229.9 mm) on February 24, 1913, followed by 8.15 inches (207.0 mm) on January 26, 1914. During the wettest month on record of January 1969, 25.76 inches (654.3 mm) fell, with a whopping 23.46 inches (595.9 mm) in eight days from January 19 to 26. In contrast, the median annual rainfall for all years in Ojai is only around 18.1 inches (460 mm) and in the driest "rain year" from July 2020 to June 2021, just 5.46 inches (138.7 mm) fell in twelve months. The wettest "rain year" was from July 1997 to June 1998 with 48.29 inches (1,226.6 mm).

Climate data for Ojai, California, 1991–2020 normals, extremes 1905–present
Month	Jan	Feb	Mar	Apr	May	Jun	Jul	Aug	Sep	Oct	Nov	Dec	Year
Record high °F (°C)	91 (33)	92 (33)	98 (37)	104 (40)	105 (41)	119 (48)	117 (47)	115 (46)	117 (47)	109 (43)	100 (38)	94 (34)	119 (48)
Mean maximum °F (°C)	81.3 (27.4)	81.8 (27.7)	85.9 (29.9)	92.5 (33.6)	94.5 (34.7)	98.0 (36.7)	102.4 (39.1)	104.5 (40.3)	104.1 (40.1)	98.5 (36.9)	89.1 (31.7)	80.2 (26.8)	107.1 (41.7)
Mean daily maximum °F (°C)	66.0 (18.9)	66.9 (19.4)	69.8 (21.0)	74.0 (23.3)	77.4 (25.2)	82.1 (27.8)	88.8 (31.6)	91.2 (32.9)	88.2 (31.2)	80.9 (27.2)	72.7 (22.6)	65.3 (18.5)	76.9 (24.9)
Daily mean °F (°C)	50.2 (10.1)	51.3 (10.7)	54.3 (12.4)	57.6 (14.2)	61.7 (16.5)	65.9 (18.8)	71.5 (21.9)	72.4 (22.4)	69.7 (20.9)	62.9 (17.2)	55.0 (12.8)	49.3 (9.6)	60.2 (15.7)
Mean daily minimum °F (°C)	34.5 (1.4)	35.8 (2.1)	38.7 (3.7)	41.2 (5.1)	46.0 (7.8)	49.7 (9.8)	54.1 (12.3)	53.5 (11.9)	51.1 (10.6)	44.9 (7.2)	37.4 (3.0)	33.2 (0.7)	43.3 (6.3)
Mean minimum °F (°C)	27.2 (−2.7)	29.3 (−1.5)	31.9 (−0.1)	35.0 (1.7)	40.4 (4.7)	44.6 (7.0)	49.0 (9.4)	48.2 (9.0)	44.6 (7.0)	38.4 (3.6)	30.9 (−0.6)	26.4 (−3.1)	25.2 (−3.8)
Record low °F (°C)	13 (−11)	22 (−6)	25 (−4)	27 (−3)	31 (−1)	34 (1)	40 (4)	39 (4)	37 (3)	25 (−4)	23 (−5)	16 (−9)	13 (−11)
Average precipitation inches (mm)	5.09 (129)	5.24 (133)	3.41 (87)	1.08 (27)	0.54 (14)	0.11 (2.8)	0.07 (1.8)	0.00 (0.00)	0.10 (2.5)	0.84 (21)	1.32 (34)	2.88 (73)	20.68 (525.1)
Average snowfall inches (cm)	0.0 (0.0)	0.0 (0.0)	0.1 (0.25)	0.0 (0.0)	0.0 (0.0)	0.0 (0.0)	0.0 (0.0)	0.0 (0.0)	0.0 (0.0)	0.0 (0.0)	0.0 (0.0)	0.0 (0.0)	0.1 (0.25)
Average precipitation days (≥ 0.01 in)	6.8	8.0	7.1	4.0	2.7	1.0	0.5	0.0	0.5	2.7	4.1	6.8	44.2
Average snowy days (≥ 0.1 in)	0.0	0.0	0.2	0.0	0.0	0.0	0.0	0.0	0.0	0.0	0.0	0.0	0.2
Source 1: NOAA
Source 2: National Weather Service

== Demographics ==
Historical population
Census	Pop.	Note	%±
1930	1,468		—
1940	1,622		10.5%
1950	2,519		55.3%
1960	4,495		78.4%
1970	5,591		24.4%
1980	6,816		21.9%
1990	7,613		11.7%
2000	7,862		3.3%
2010	7,461		−5.1%
2020	7,637		2.4%
U.S. Decennial Census; 1850–1870 1880-1890; 1900 1910 1920; 1930 1940 1950; 1960 1970 1980; 1990 2000 2010

=== 2020 census ===
As of the 2020 census, Ojai had a population of 7,637 and a population density of 1,753.2 inhabitants per square mile (676.9/km^{2}). The median age was 49.7 years. The age distribution was 17.6% under the age of 18, 6.0% aged 18 to 24, 20.8% aged 25 to 44, 28.4% aged 45 to 64, and 27.2% who were 65 years of age or older. For every 100 females, there were 85.0 males, and for every 100 females age 18 and over, there were 81.6 males age 18 and over.

The census reported that 97.6% of the population lived in households, 0.7% lived in non-institutionalized group quarters, and 1.7% were institutionalized. There were 3,194 households, of which 26.3% had children under the age of 18 living in them. Of all households, 44.1% were married-couple households, 6.5% were cohabiting couple households, 15.2% were households with a male householder and no spouse or partner present, and 34.2% were households with a female householder and no spouse or partner present. About 31.5% of all households were made up of individuals, 18.8% had someone living alone who was 65 years of age or older, and the average household size was 2.33. There were 1,947 families (61.0% of all households).

There were 3,475 housing units at an average density of 797.8 units per square mile (308.0 units/km^{2}). Of all housing units, 91.9% were occupied and 8.1% were vacant. Of occupied units, 54.3% were owner-occupied and 45.7% were occupied by renters. The homeowner vacancy rate was 1.6%, and the rental vacancy rate was 3.4%.

99.4% of residents lived in urban areas, while 0.6% lived in rural areas.

Racial composition as of the 2020 census
Race	Number	Percent
White	5,872	76.9%
Black or African American	34	0.4%
American Indian and Alaska Native	78	1.0%
Asian	231	3.0%
Native Hawaiian and Other Pacific Islander	8	0.1%
Some other race	534	7.0%
Two or more races	880	11.5%
Hispanic or Latino (of any race)	1,465	19.2%

=== Demographic estimates ===
In 2023, the US Census Bureau estimated that 13.8% of the population were foreign-born. Of all people aged 5 or older, 79.9% spoke only English at home, 17.0% spoke Spanish, 1.4% spoke other Indo-European languages, 1.5% spoke Asian or Pacific Islander languages, and 0.2% spoke other languages. Of those aged 25 or older, 88.5% were high school graduates and 46.2% had a bachelor's degree.

=== Income and poverty ===
The median household income in 2023 was $79,202, and the per capita income was $60,511. About 7.9% of families and 11.0% of the population were below the poverty line.

=== 2010 census ===
The city's population dropped between the years 2000-2010. The 2010 United States census reported that Ojai had a population of 7,461. The population density was 1,695.3 inhabitants per square mile (654.6/km^{2}). The racial makeup of Ojai was 6,555 (87.9%) White, 42 (0.6%) African American, 47 (0.6%) Native American, 158 (2.1%) Asian, 1 (0.0%) Pacific Islander, 440 (5.9%) from other races, and 218 (2.9%) from two or more races. Hispanic or Latino of any race were 1,339 persons (17.9%).

The Census reported that 7,281 people (97.6% of the population) lived in households, 48 (0.6%) lived in non-institutionalized group quarters, and 132 (1.8%) were institutionalized.

There were 3,111 households, out of which 876 (28.2%) had children under the age of 18 living in them, 1,396 (44.9%) were opposite-sex married couples living together, 366 (11.8%) had a female householder with no husband present, 128 (4.1%) had a male householder with no wife present. There were 151 (4.9%) unmarried opposite-sex partnerships, and 25 (0.8%) same-sex married couples or partnerships. 992 households (31.9%) were made up of individuals, and 496 (15.9%) had someone living alone who was 65 years of age or older. The average household size was 2.34. There were 1,890 families (60.8% of all households); the average family size was 2.95.

The population distribution was spread out, with 1,520 people (20.4%) under the age of 18, 515 people (6.9%) aged 18 to 24, 1,446 people (19.4%) aged 25 to 44, 2,547 people (34.1%) aged 45 to 64, and 1,433 people (19.2%) who were 65 years of age or older. The median age was 47.1 years. For every 100 females, there were 84.9 males. For every 100 females age 18 and over, there were 79.9 males.

There were 3,382 housing units at an average density of 768.5 per square mile (296.7/km^{2}), of which 1,717 (55.2%) were owner-occupied, and 1,394 (44.8%) were occupied by renters. The homeowner vacancy rate was 1.7%; the rental vacancy rate was 5.4%. 4,243 people (56.9% of the population) lived in owner-occupied housing units and 3,038 people (40.7%) lived in rental housing units.

== Economy ==
Ojai is a tourism destination known for its boutique hotels, recreation opportunities, hiking, and farmers' market of local organic agriculture. The 306-room Ojai Valley Inn, which opened in 1923, is situated on 220 acres with a golf course and tennis courts. There are just 12 hotels within city limits but short-term vacation rentals (STVR) were banned in 2016. A few accommodations are available in the surrounding unincorporated area where the county has placed similar restrictions on STVR. It has small businesses specializing in local and ecologically friendly art, design, and home improvement. Chain stores are prohibited by city ordinance to encourage local small business development and keep the town unique.

=== Cannabis ===
Under the legalization of the sale and distribution of cannabis in California, Ojai is one of two cities in the county that initially allowed retail sales. Voters approved a 3% tax on retail marijuana sales on 2020, which could eventually grow to a 10% tax. State law says local governments may not prohibit adults from growing, using or transporting marijuana for personal use but they can prohibit companies from growing, testing, and selling cannabis within their jurisdiction by licensing none or only some of these activities. The state requires cities to allow deliveries. By the end of 2018, three recreational marijuana storefronts were open in close proximity to each other. In 2020, there were two manufacturing businesses that were going through the permitting processes and the city was considering allowing on-site cannabis consumption.

== Arts and culture ==
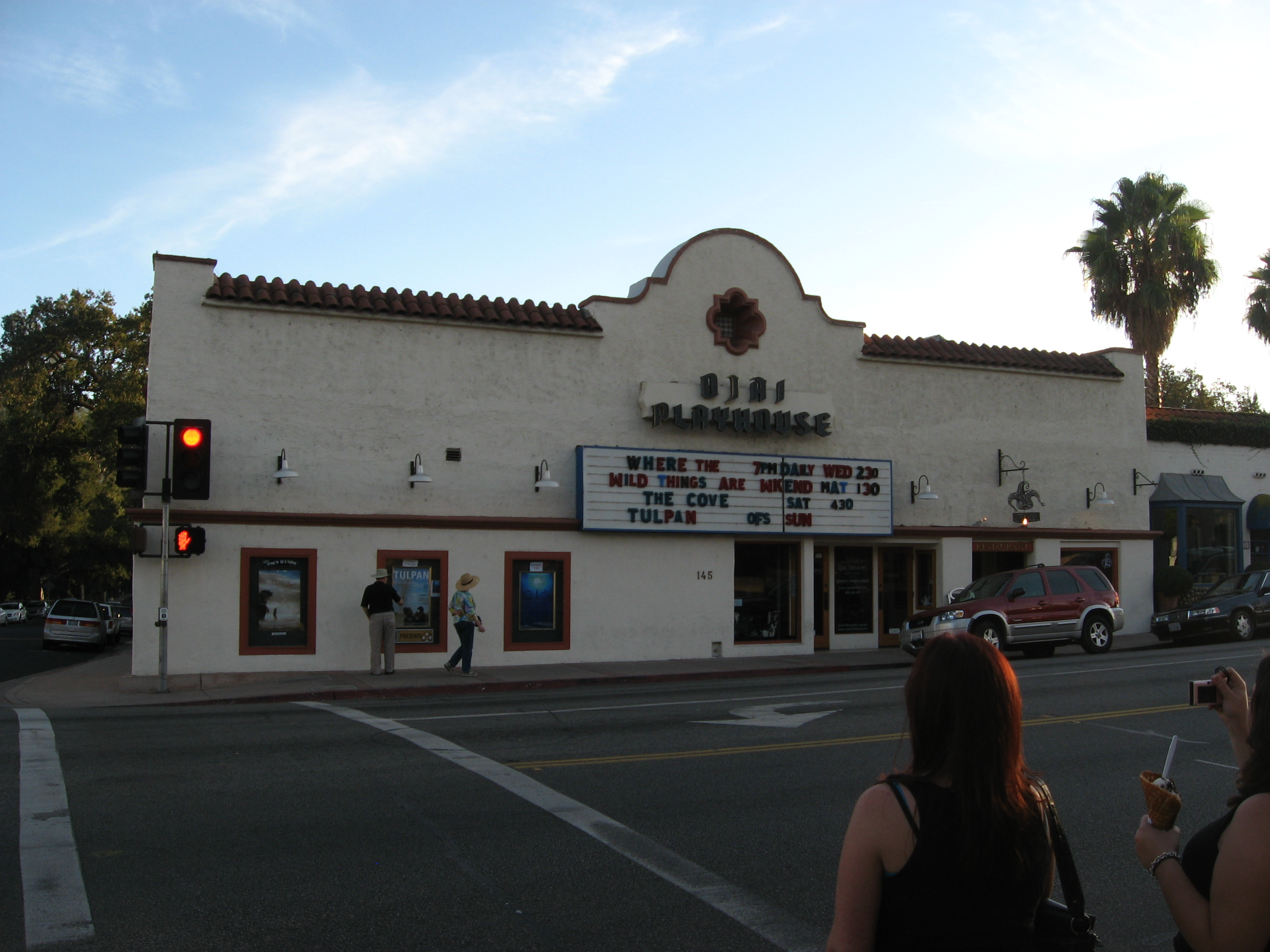
Ojai Playhouse

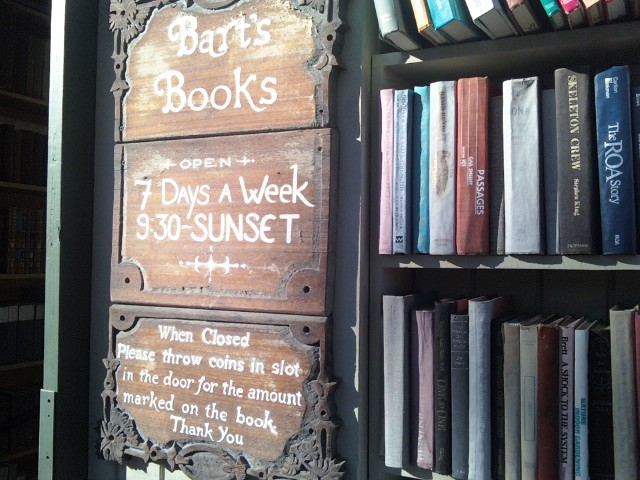
Bart's Books, Ojai

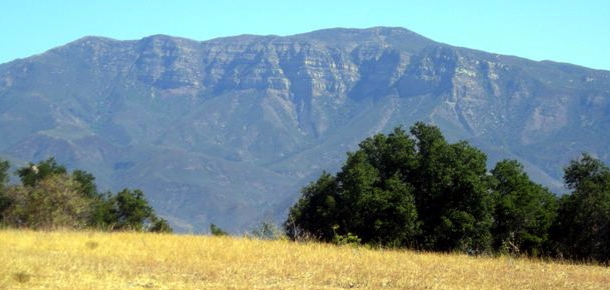
Meher Mount, a place of spiritual retreat

Ojai's culture is heavily focused on ecology, health and organic agriculture, NIMBYism, walking/hiking, spirituality, music and local art. Weekends may include exhibiting classic cars or motorcycle clubs touring the area.

The Ojai Music Festival (founded in 1947) is an annual festival of performances by some of the world's top musicians and composers, and occurs on the first weekend after Memorial Day. Notable appearances include Igor Stravinsky, Aaron Copland, Esa-Pekka Salonen and Pierre Boulez, who was festival director in 2003. The outdoor bookshop Bart's Books, subject of news programs and documentaries, has been in Ojai since 1964. Ojai is home to the annual Ojai Playwrights Conference, a two-week playwrights festival that brings professional writers and actors from across the country to Ojai. The community is served by the Ojai Valley News, a weekly newspaper, the Ojai Valley Guide (formerly the Ojai Valley Visitors Guide) and the Ojai Quarterly, magazines published every three months.

In early June, often coinciding with the Music Festival, the Ojai Wine Festival is held at Lake Casitas. Over 3,000 wine lovers sample the products of more than 30 wineries. Proceeds go to charity.

== Parks and recreation ==
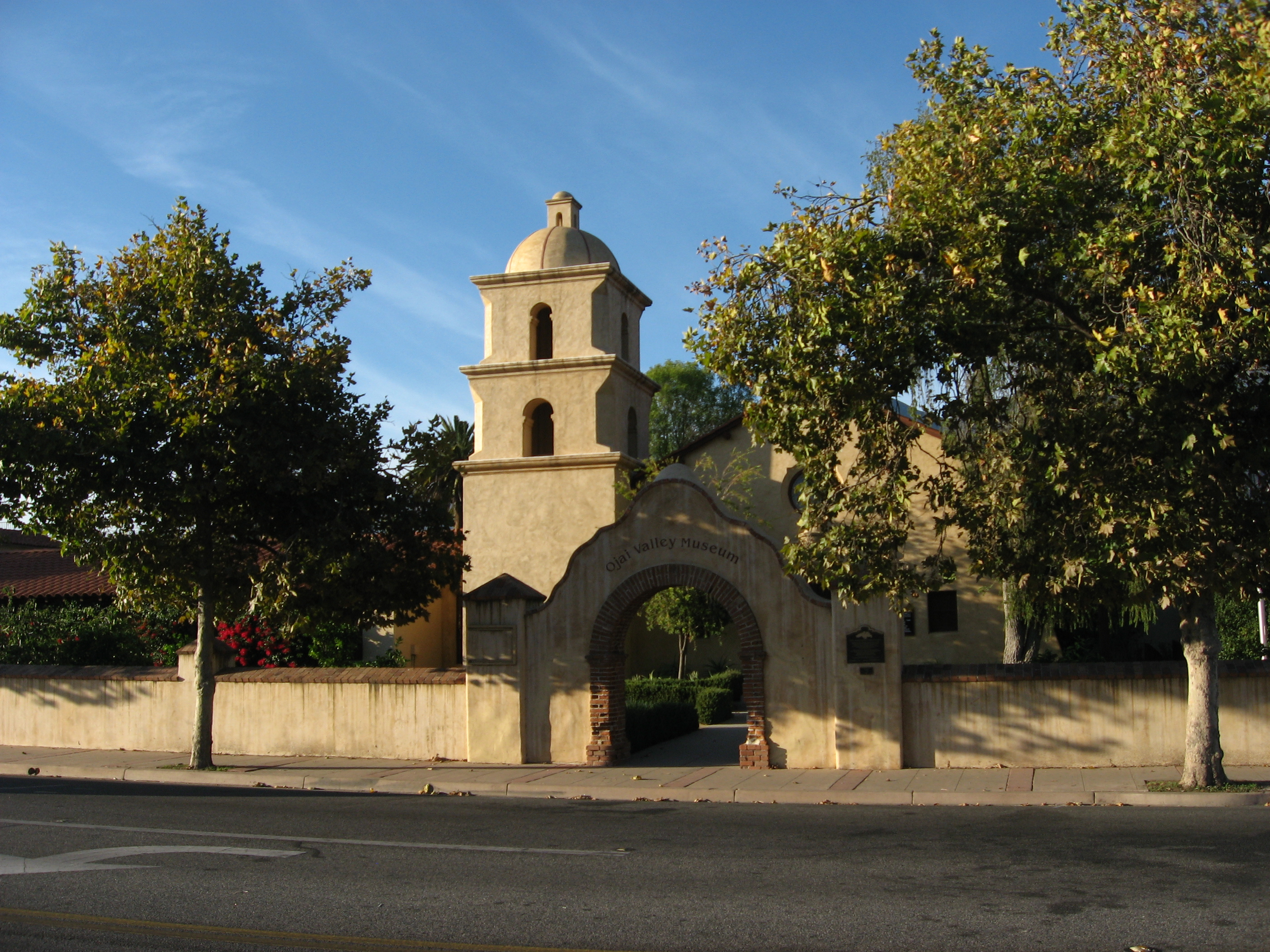
Ojai Valley Museum, 2009

The town of Ojai and the surrounding area is home to many recreational activities. Los Padres National Forest borders the town on the north, and many back country areas within the forest are accessible from SR 33, the major north–south highway through town. Matilija Creek is a spot to enjoy splashing under waterfalls and backpacking. To the west, the Lake Casitas Recreation Area offers camping, picnicking, hiking, boating, fishing, and has a water park.

The valley has several public tennis courts in downtown Libbey Park. There are also two major golf courses: the Soule Park Golf Course, and the Ojai Valley Inn Golf Course. The town completed a new park, Cluff Vista Park, in 2002, which contains several small themed regions of California native plants, two water features, and three public art works. The park is located on a small hill which has a view of the mountains surrounding the town.

Sarzotti Park is a 10-acre (4.0 ha) city park that is home to the City of Ojai Recreation Center. The center was formerly the Boyd Clubhouse which was built in 1903 and located on the south side of Ojai Avenue east of Libbey Park. The Boyd Club was a men's athletic and activity club. The Boyd clubhouse was moved to Sarzotti Park in 1957. The city's recreational program offers soccer, softball, football, basketball, tennis, volleyball, exercise programs, and many other classes.

In April, the Ojai Tennis Tournament is held. It is the oldest tennis tournament west of the Mississippi River (founded in 1896) and has been an early competition for many players who went on to earn one or more Grand Slam titles. The Wall of Fame in Libbey Park honors players who competed and went on to win at least one Grand Slam. William Thacher (brother of Sherman Thacher) founded the Ojai Valley Tennis Club in 1895. There were five years when the tournament was not held: 1924 because of a hoof-and-mouth epidemic and from 1943 to 1946 during and just after World War II.

Ventura County parks in the area include Foster Park near Casitas Springs, Camp Comfort on Creek Road, Soule Park and Soule Park Golf Course, and Dennison Park on the Dennison Grade.

Annually, in early April, the town hosts a bicycle race that draws professional and amateur teams from around the country. The "Garrett Lemire Memorial Grand Prix" began in 2004 as a tribute to a 22-year-old cyclist from Ojai who died racing his bicycle in Arizona the previous year. The race is held on a one-mile (1.6 km) circuit that circumnavigates Libbey Bowl in the heart of downtown Ojai.

== Public safety ==
=== Law enforcement ===
The Ventura County Sheriff's Office provides law enforcement services for the city.

=== Wildlife ===
Residents have seen mountain lions roaming the area.

== Education ==
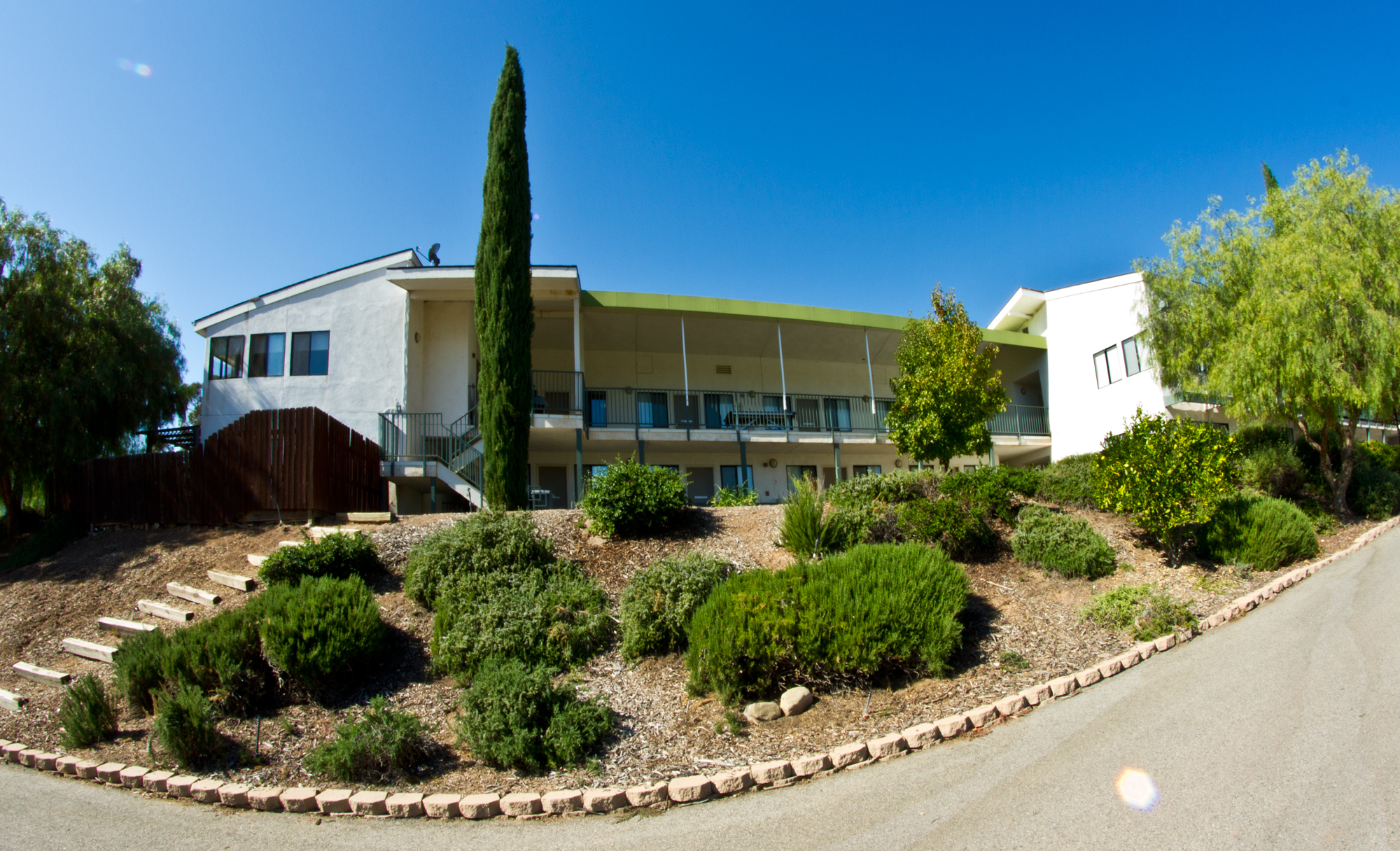
Dormitory at Besant Hill School

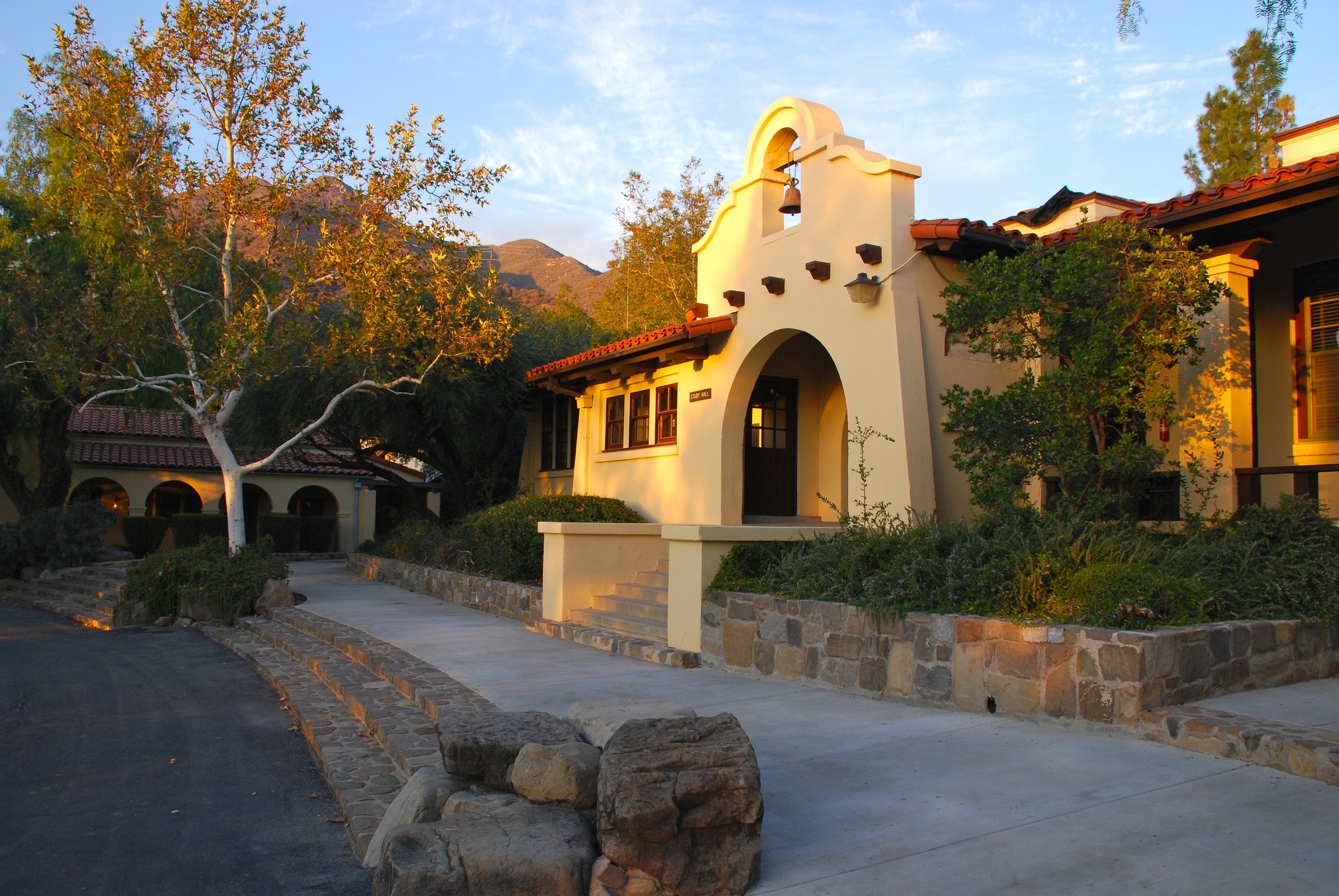
Old Main at the Thacher School

=== Public schools ===
- Ojai Unified School District
  - Chaparral High School
  - Nordhoff Junior High and High School
  - Meiners Oaks Early Education School
  - Mira Monte Elementary School
  - Summit School
  - Topa Topa Elementary School

=== Other schools ===
The Ojai Valley is home to several private boarding schools as well as other private and alternative school programs:

- Besant Hill School of Happy Valley (formerly Happy Valley School)
- The Thacher School
- Ojai Valley School
- Villanova Preparatory School
- Oak Grove School
- Weil Tennis Academy
- Monica Ros School (preschool through 3rd grade)
- The Montessori School of Ojai
- Valley Oak Charter School (a WASC accredited K-12 public homeschool hybrid charter)
- Laurel Springs School (distance education and homeschooling)
- Rock Tree Sky (a self-directed learning community)
- Global Village School (a homeschool and private school hybrid using self-directed, distance education)
- Camp Ramah in California (a Jewish summer camp)
- Also, the Summer Science Program was formerly hosted at the Besant Hill School (2000–2009) and at The Thacher School (1959–1999).

== Media ==
- Ojai Valley News (Weekly paper)
- The Ojai Post (News blog)

== Infrastructure ==
=== Utilities ===
In 2013, a plan to take over the private water system was approved by voters. Up to $60 million in bonds would be issued and a special tax district would be formed. This was approved by almost 90 percent of voters but it was tied up in court by the private water purveyor, Golden State Water Company. Casitas Municipal Water District took over management of the Ojai water system by purchase of the franchise from Golden State Water Company in April 2017. The Ojai Valley Sanitary District treats the sewage from the city and surrounding areas. In 2020, the city banned new hook-ups to natural gas except for restaurants and pools.

=== Libraries ===
Public libraries: Ventura County Library—14 county locations, with three branches in the Ojai Valley:

- Ojai Library
- Oak View Library
- Meiners Oaks Library

=== Transportation ===
The City of Ojai operates the Ojai Trolley bus system. Gold Coast Transit connects Ojai with Ventura.

== In popular culture ==
The title characters of the TV series The Bionic Woman and The Six Million Dollar Man (Jaime Sommers and Col. Steve Austin) are described in the series as having been childhood sweethearts in Ojai. In these series, a sign on the highway entering Ojai reads "Welcome to Ojai, home of American astronaut Steven Austin."

The Ojai Valley Inn (a historic Ojai institution) was featured in the 1990 movie The Two Jakes (starring Jack Nicholson and Harvey Keitel).

In the 1990 action film Hard to Kill, starring Steven Seagal as LAPD detective Mason Storm, a key sequence takes place in Ojai, where the protagonist hides and recovers from injuries at a secluded residence before returning to Los Angeles.

"Ojai" was mentioned frequently in the TV Series Brothers & Sisters (2006-2011). The family business was named "Ojai Foods," which operated in Los Angeles but had roots in the Ojai Valley. The Walker family had a cabin in Ojai that they used to visit.

The city of Ojai served as the main location setting for the 2010 film Easy A, starring Emma Stone. Ojai was also mentioned in the 2017 Taylor Sheridan film Wind River.

== Notable people ==
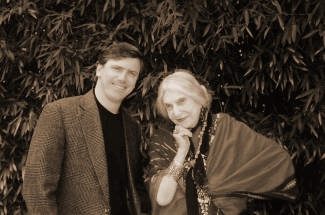
Tom Neff and Beatrice Wood in Ojai, 1993

=== A–G ===
- Bud Abbott, actor, producer, and comedian
- Beth Allen, professional golfer
- David Allen, writer, Getting Things Done
- June Allyson, actress
- Colman Andrews, writer and editor
- Ethel Percy Andrus, founder of AARP
- Sergio Aragonés, cartoonist
- Daniel Ash, musician
- Alan Ball, film and television writer and producer
- Irene Bedard, actor, musician
- Ed Begley Jr., actor
- Lucy Bellwood, cartoonist and illustrator
- Max Bemis, comic-book writer and lead singer of the band Say Anything
- Paul Bergmann, football player
- Elmer Bernstein, film and television composer
- Jon Bernthal, actor
- Bruce Botnick, engineer and producer for The Doors musical group
- Ingrid Boulting, artist, actress
- Pierre Bouvier, singer of Simple Plan
- Eileen Brennan, actress
- Eric Burdon, singer-songwriter and actor
- Tim Burton, film director
- Rory Calhoun, actor
- Mario Calire, Grammy Award–winning drummer
- Julie Christensen, singer
- Julie Christie, Oscar-winning actress
- Cory Coffey, BMX rider
- Glenn Corbett, actor
- Ted Danson, actor
- Anthony de Mello, spiritual leader
- John Diehl, director, actor in Stargate and The Shield
- Vernon Dvorak, meteorologist, Dvorak Technique for tropical cyclone analysis
- Dave England, Jackass star
- Peter Farrelly, film director, writer, and producer
- Maynard Ferguson, jazz musician, composer
- Joe Flanigan, actor
- Robben Ford, blues/jazz guitarist and vocalist
- Mark Frost, screenwriter and television writer
- Sharon Gabet, actress
- Donald Glover, actor and musician
- Lindy Goetz, music manager (Red Hot Chili Peppers)
- Eric Goode, filmmaker and conservationist

=== H–M ===
- Larry Hagman, actor in I Dream of Jeannie and Dallas
- Anne Hathaway, actress
- Anne Heche, actress, director, and screenwriter
- Otto and Vivika Heino, ceramic artists, "The Pottery"
- Toby Hemingway, actor in The Covenant and Feast of Love; moved to Ojai with his mother when he was 13
- Richard Jefferson, Australia-based molecular biologist, open-source science advocate, founder of CAMBIA
- Mikael Jorgensen, keyboardist for Wilco
- Steve Kanaly, actor who played Ray Krebbs on the television drama Dallas
- Cody Kasch, actor and SAG-award winner for Desperate Housewives
- Byron Katie, founder of The Work
- Roger Kellaway, jazz pianist and composer
- Linda Kelsey, actress in Lou Grant
- Ed Kowalczyk, lead singer for Live
- John Krasinski, actor
- Jiddu Krishnamurti, philosopher
- James Kyson Lee, Korean-American film actor, educated at Villanova Preparatory School
- Diane Ladd, actress, writer, director nominated three times each for Emmys and Oscars
- John Langley, creator of COPS
- Harry Lauter, character actor in film and television
- Gene Lees, composer, lyricist, author, jazz critic
- Zachary Levi, actor in Chuck and Less Than Perfect
- Ted Levine, actor in The Silence of the Lambs and television's Monk
- Larry Linville, actor in M*A*S*H
- Lissie, singer/songwriter
- Jackie Lomax, musician, first artist signed to Apple Records, a label started by The Beatles
- Noah Lowry, former pitcher for the San Francisco Giants
- Johnny Mandel, composer and arranger of popular songs, film music and jazz
- S.A. Martinez, singer/rapper of the group 311
- Stacy Margolin (born 1959), tennis player
- Dave Mason, English musician, singer and songwriter
- Elisabeth Maurus (aka Lissie), folk-rock musician
- Orpheo McCord, drummer/percussionist for Edward Sharpe and the Magnetic Zeros
- Malcolm McDowell, actor
- Charles Millard Pratt, oil industrialist and philanthropist
- Rodney Mullen, skateboarder

=== N–Z ===
- Bill Paxton, actor in Aliens and Apollo 13
- Paula Jean Myers-Pope, Olympic diver
- Anthony Quinn, actor, painter, and writer
- Betsy Randle, actress, Boy Meets World
- Rick Rossovich, actor in Top Gun and Roxanne
- Louise Sandhaus, graphic designer
- Peter Scolari, actor in Newhart and Honey, I Shrunk the Kids: The TV Show
- Rose Schlossberg, filmmaker, writer, actress
- Jan Smithers, actress in WKRP in Cincinnati
- Mary Steenburgen, actress
- Donna Steichen, Roman Catholic journalist and critic of feminism
- Izzy Stradlin, guitarist, formerly in rock group Guns N' Roses
- Peter Strauss, actor in The Jericho Mile and Rich Man, Poor Man
- George S. Stuart, sculptor
- Chuck Testa, taxidermist and subject of an internet meme
- Caroline Thompson, screenwriter and director
- Christopher Trumbo, screenwriter
- Rodney Walker, mid-century modern architect
- Beau Weaver, voice actor, narrator
- Anson Williams, actor, Happy Days
- Reese Witherspoon, Oscar-winning actress and producer
- Beatrice Wood, artist, teacher at the Happy Valley School
- Dana Wynter, actress, Invasion of the Body Snatchers
- James Wysong, writer
- Loretta Young, Oscar-winning actress and television hostess
- Chloé Zhao, filmmaker and Oscar-winning director
- David Zucker, director of Airplane!, Top Secret!, and The Naked Gun
- Eugene Cole "Gene" Zubrinsky, master genealogist and Fellow of the American Society of Genealogists (FASG)

== See also ==
- Ojai, California−related topics
