= Greenspring Associates =

American venture capital firm

- Type: Private
- Industry: Venture capital
- Founded: 2000
- Defunct: 2021
- Key people: C. Ashton Newhall, James "Jim" Lim, John Avirett, Hunter Somerville, Eric Thompson
- AUM: $17B
- Number of employees: 150
- Website: www.greenspringassociates.com

Greenspring Associates was a venture capital firm that invested primarily in the information technology, biotechnology, healthcare and telecommunications sectors. The firm was based in Owings Mills, Maryland and maintained offices in Palo Alto, CA, Miami, FL, London, and Beijing. The company was led by two Managing General Partners, C. Ashton Newhall and James "Jim" Lim, along with General Partners Hunter Somerville, John Avirett, and Lindsay Redfield, as well as Chief Operating Officer Eric Thompson, Chief Financial Officer Carrie McIntyre, and Partners Seyonne Kang and Adair Newhall. In 2021, the Firm agreed to be acquired by StepStone Group in a transaction valued north of $725 million, bringing the combined firm's assets under management to a figure around $27 billion.

Greenspring Associates pioneered the "flywheel" of venture capital investing, blending fund, direct and secondary investments while also providing bespoke solutions on behalf of large institutions. As of July 2021, in combination with StepStone Group's venture capital outfit, the combined firm managed over $17B USD in assets under management (AUM) on behalf of a wide range of global institutions.

== History ==
Greenspring Associates was founded in 2000 as Montagu Newhall Associates by C. Ashton Newhall, son of New Enterprise Associates' co-founder, venture capitalist Chuck Newhall, and Rupert Montagu.

In 2010, the firm became "Greenspring Associates".

The firm's historical direct investments include Chewy.com, Fuze, Everything But The House, ExactTarget (now Salesforce Marketing Cloud), NeoTract, Inc. (now Teleflex), euNetworks, GrubHub, Cologix, Cvent, Gigya, Intarcia Therapeutics, Workfront, Teamviewer, DemandBase, Proofpoint, ChannelAdvisor, Cameron Health (now part of Boston Scientific), ScanSafe and Assent Compliance.
