= Intarcia Therapeutics =

American pharmaceutical company

Intarcia Therapeutics, Inc.
- Company type: Private
- Industry: pharmaceutical industry
- Founded: Hayward, California, United States (1995)
- Headquarters: Boston, MA, United States
- Key people: Kurt C. Graves (Chairman, President and CEO)
- Products: Medici Drug Delivery System
- Website: intarcia.com

Intarcia Therapeutics is an American biopharmaceutical company based in Boston, MA and incorporated under the laws of Delaware. It was founded in 1995 under the name "BioMedicines" and changed to its present name in 2004. In 2013, Intarcia relocated its headquarters to Boston, keeping its manufacturing facility in Hayward, CA. In addition to Boston and Hayward, Intarcia also has a location in Research Triangle Park, North Carolina, where it discovers and develops peptides for its drug delivery system.

In 2005, the executive leadership of Intarcia was largely vested in two people, Karling Leung and James Ahlers, President/CEO/Director and Vice President/CFO/Finance & Operations Officer, respectively. By 2012, Kurt Graves had replaced Karling Leung as President and CEO. Kurt Graves has been with Intarcia since August 2010, first serving as Executive Chairman before becoming President and CEO in April 2012.

As of 2016, Intarcia is engaged in development of a "potential once-a-year type 2 diabetes treatment". Referred to as ITCA 650, the therapeutic consists of exenatide delivered via its Medici Drug Delivery System, "a drug delivery platform that stabilizes and delivers therapeutic proteins and peptides". The drug was rejected for FDA approval in 2017 and 2020.

== Investors ==
In November 2012, Intarcia received $210M in preferred stock and debt financing from, The Baupost Group, Farallon Capital Management, New Enterprise Associates, New Leaf Venture Partners and Venrock Associates. Other Investors include Greenspring Associates, Alta Partners and Granite Venture Partners.

In April 2014, Intarcia secured an additional $200M in financing. RA Capital led the round and was joined by new and existing investors. In April 2015, the company raised $225M in exchange for 1.5% of future global net sales of ITCA 650. In May 2016, Intarcia secured an additional $75M in financing to scale-up manufacturing and inventory in anticipation of ITCA 650s global launch. In September 2016, Intarcia raised an additional $215M in equity financing to prepare for the commercial launch of ITCA 650 in late 2017 and additional pipeline programs.
