= Oscar Easley Block =

- U.S. National Register of Historic Places
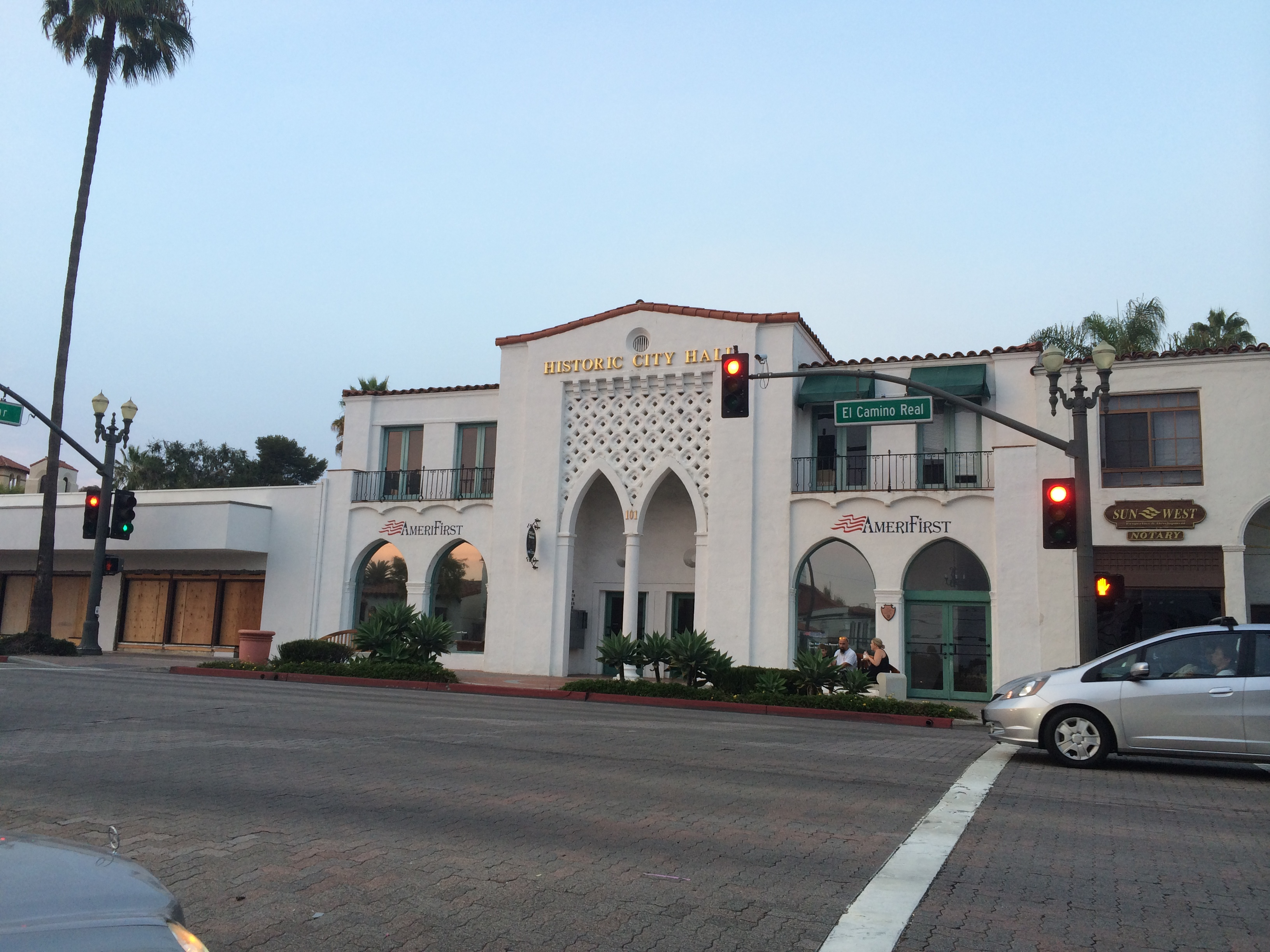
- Building as viewed from Avenida Del Mar

- Location within California Location within the United States
- Location: 101 El Camino Real; San Clemente, California 92672
- Coordinates: 33°25′39.5″N 117°36′45.00″W
- Area: less than one acre
- Built: 1929
- Built by: Leroy M. Strang
- Architect: Virgil Westbrook
- Architectural style: Spanish Colonial Revival
- NRHP reference No.: 83001213
- Added to NRHP: February 17, 1983

Oscar Easley Block, also known as Historic City Hall, is a prominent building that was one of the early founding buildings in San Clemente, California, originally built to house offices and a bank. The building was added to the National Register of Historic Places listings in Orange County, California in 1983.

== History ==
=== Construction ===
Two years after the initial grading was completed by Oscar Easley's street grading crew, Easley acquired the property across the street from Ole Hansen's real estate offices which were selling lots in the newly created city of San Clemente. Easley was also responsible for laying the foundation for Ole Hansen's beachfront home Casa Romantica. In March 1929, a building permit was pulled to construct a two-story office building. The first floor of the office building would eventually be occupied by Bank of America, while the second floor would become offices for the Chamber of Commerce, and Headquarters of the Ole Hanson Organization. The office building was designed by Virgil Westbrook who was also the designer of the San Clemente Beach Club. The building was built by Leroy M Strang. Virgel and Leroy both were elected in 1928 to the first five-member City Council of San Clemente. Leroy also served as the Mayor.

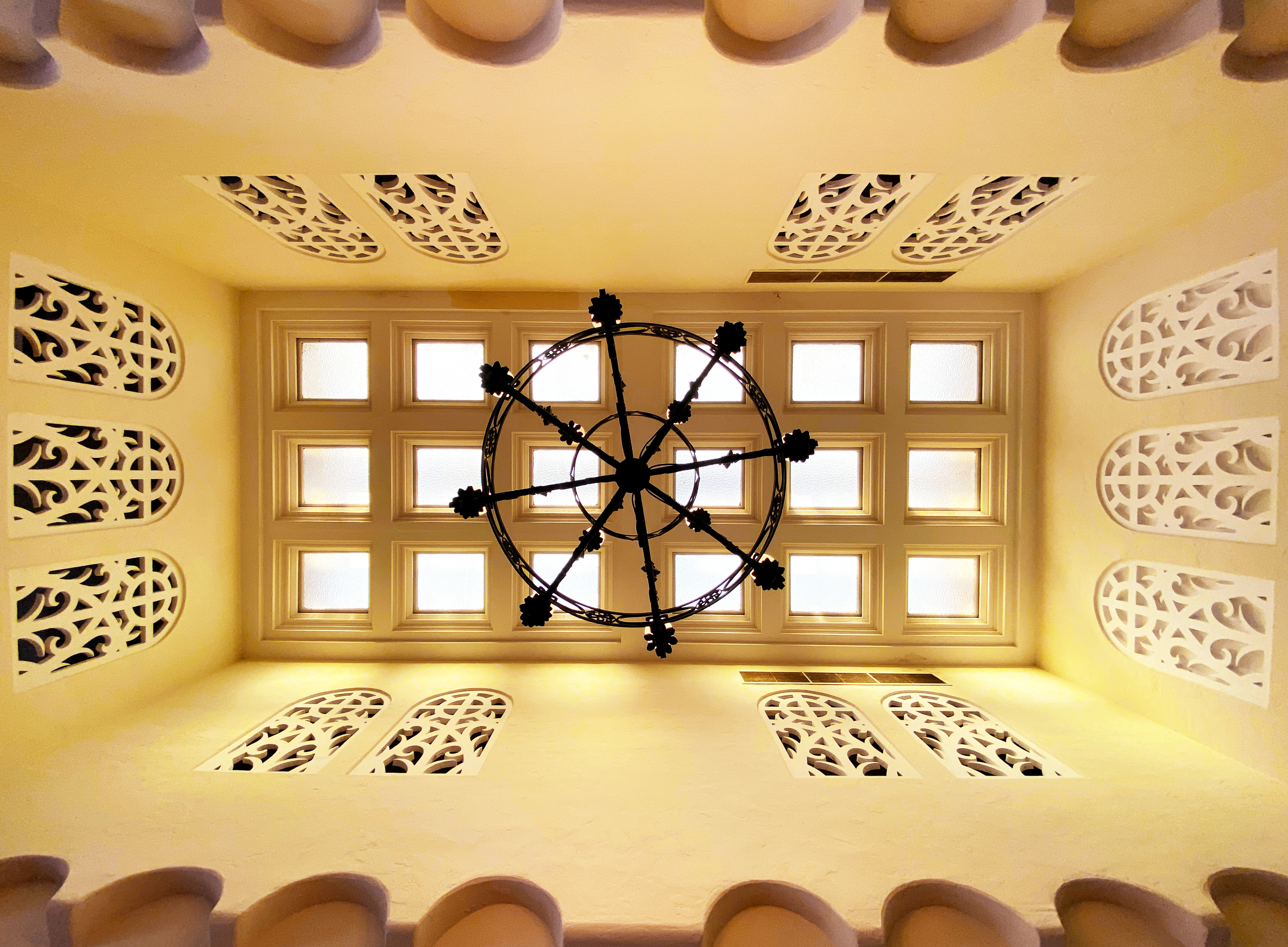
Interior Photo

=== Ownership ===
In 1936 the building became property of the Bank Of America due to a foreclosure action. The building was then acquired by Bill Ayer Jr, who then sold it to a new owner, Leo Fessenden, who in 1956 initiated a retail music business called the "House Of Music" on the property.
