= Casa Romantica =

Historic house in California, United States

- U.S. National Register of Historic Places
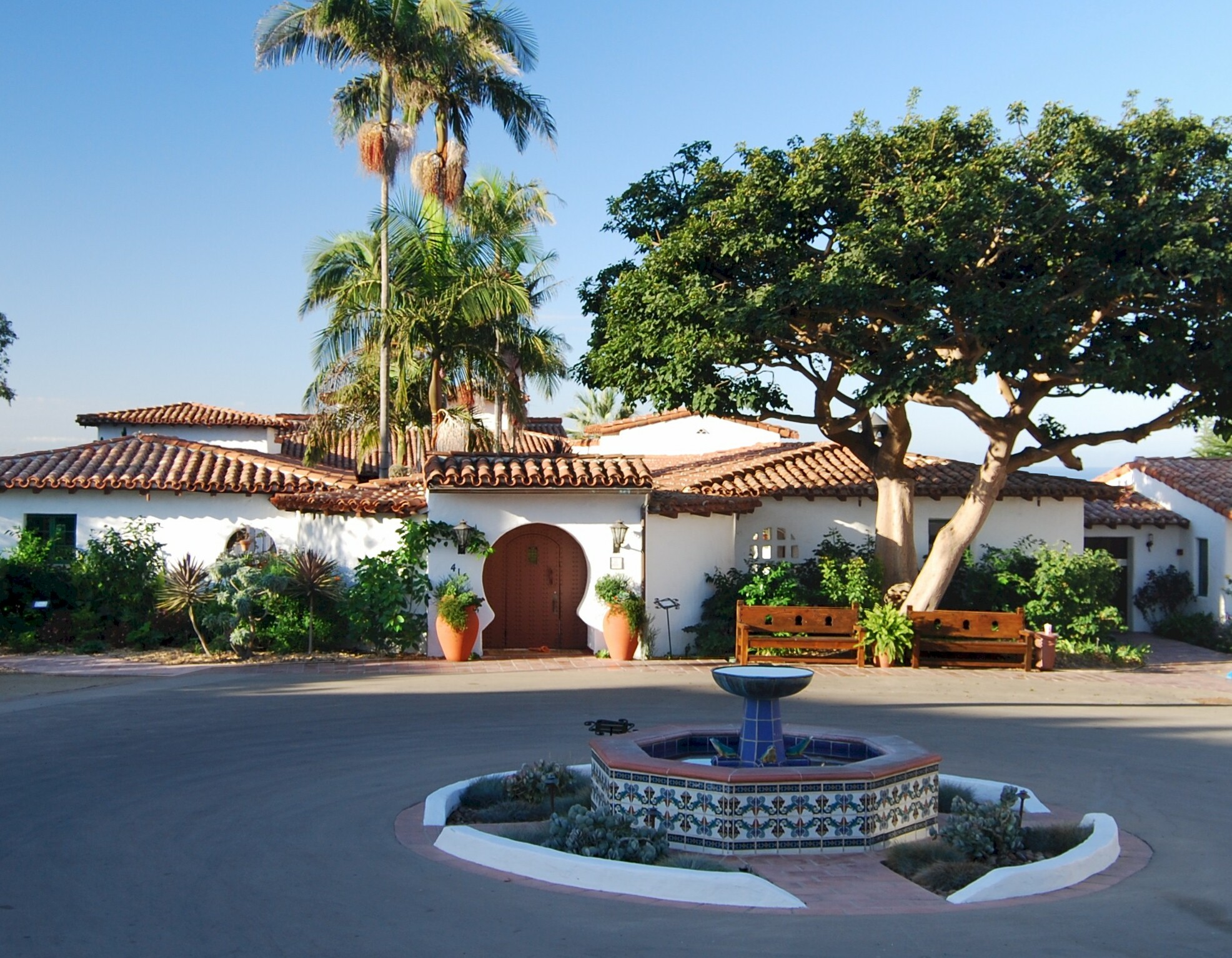
- Main entrance

- Location within California Location within the United States
- Location: 415 Avenida Granada; San Clemente, California 92672
- Coordinates: 33°25′18.04″N 117°37′13.87″W
- Built: 1927–28
- Architect: Carl Lindbom
- Architectural style: Spanish Colonial Revival
- NRHP reference No.: 91001900
- Added to NRHP: December 27, 1991

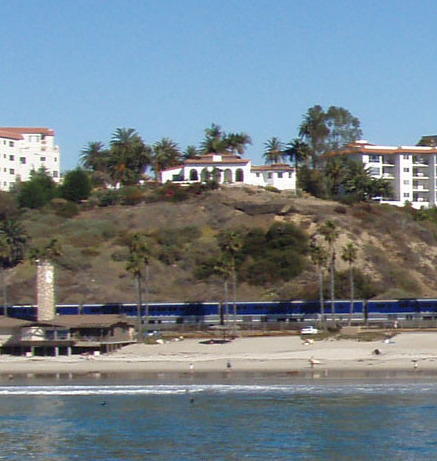
Casa Romantica seen from San Clemente Pier

Casa Romantica, officially known as the Casa Romantica Cultural Center and Gardens, is a historic building in San Clemente, California. It was the home of Ole Hanson who co-founded the city of San Clemente. Casa Romantica was listed on the National Register of Historic Places on December 27, 1991.

Casa Romantica Cultural Center and Gardens is a non-profit 501(c)3 organization that provides cultural programs at the site. The organization was founded in 2002 by a charter of the City of San Clemente.

== History ==
=== Construction ===
Ole Hanson, a real estate developer and one-time mayor of Seattle, visited San Clemente in the early 1920s and chose the site to create his ideal community, a "Spanish Village by the Sea". On December 6, 1925, Hanson persuaded people who had driven from Los Angeles and the surrounding areas for a free chicken dinner and a sales pitch to buy more than 300 lots in what then was a desolate landscape remote from the rest of southern California. Hanson and co-founder H.H. Cotton devised San Clemente as one of the first master-planned cities in California, with town boundaries consisting of roughly five miles of coastline by one mile from the shores to the inland hills.

In 1927, Hanson commissioned architect Carl Lindbom, who also designed La Casa Pacifica (the former Western White House), to design a seven-bedroom, seven-bathroom house for his family on a site overlooking the Pacific Ocean. The foundation for the house was built by Oscar Easley, who did much of the street grading for San Clemente and also established the Oscar Easley Block, which later became City Hall. Construction was completed in 1928.

Lindbom used an eclectic "Spanish Revival" style with the main entrance to the house taking the form of a moon gate. An octagonal tower served as Hanson's study. The roof tiles were hand-made Mexican "thigh tiles". The floors are pegged hardwood, and all tiles for the hallways were imported from Italy. The sliding glass doors and provision of a bathroom for each bedroom were unusual for the 1920s. A pool in the courtyard was stocked with colorful fish and the gardens with exotic birds.

=== Later ownership ===
Hanson's vision of a master-planned Spanish village prospered until the Great Depression. In 1934, the Bank of America foreclosed on the Casa Romantica. Hanson paid his $3 million debt by transferring $12 million in mortgages to the bank.

Beginning with Hanson, the estate has been owned or operated by at least seven individuals or organizations, and has been renamed at least three times.

Years	Owner/Operator	Property Name	Purchase Price	Usage
1927	Ole Hanson	Unknown	Unknown	Residence
1934	Bank of America	Unknown	Foreclosed	Residence
1941	Neil and Lucy Rasmussen	Unknown	$10,000	Residence
1946	Lambert and Patricia Schuyler	Casa Romantica	$30,000	Residence
1952	Evalyn Waring (Ex-Wife of entertainer Fred Waring)	Casa Romantica	$64,644.44	Residence
1956	Muriel and Leslie Whitehouse	Casa Blanca	$45,000	Residence
1960	George and Louise Welsh	Casa Descana, then Casa Romantica	$43,591	Senior citizens' home
1984	Leased to private business	Casa Romantica	-	Events venue
1989	San Clemente Redevelopment Agency	Leased to private business; from 2003 Casa Romantica Cultural Center and Gardens	$2,500,000	Events venue, Cultural center

=== Listing on the National Register of Historic Places and opening as cultural center ===
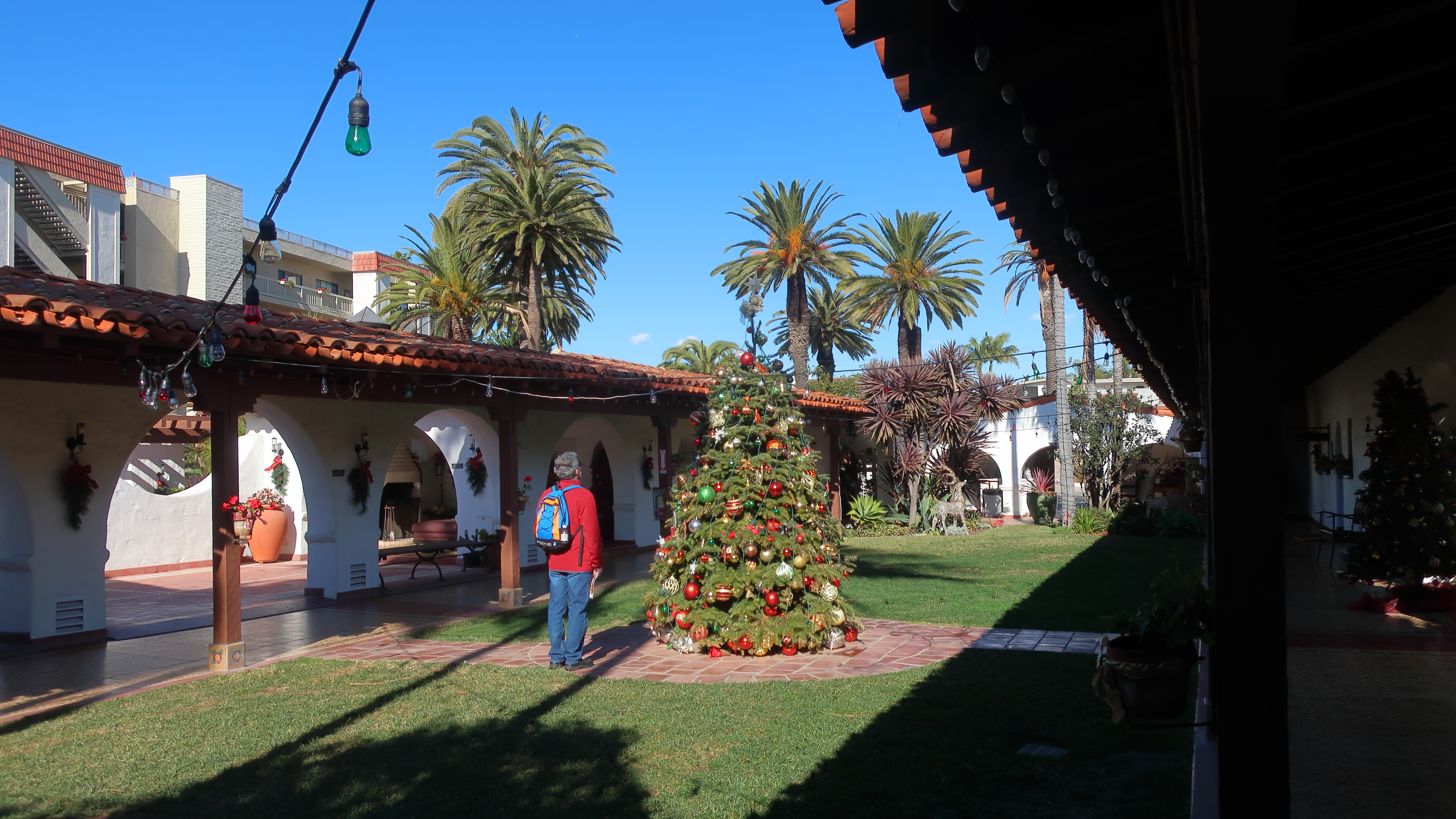
Courtyard

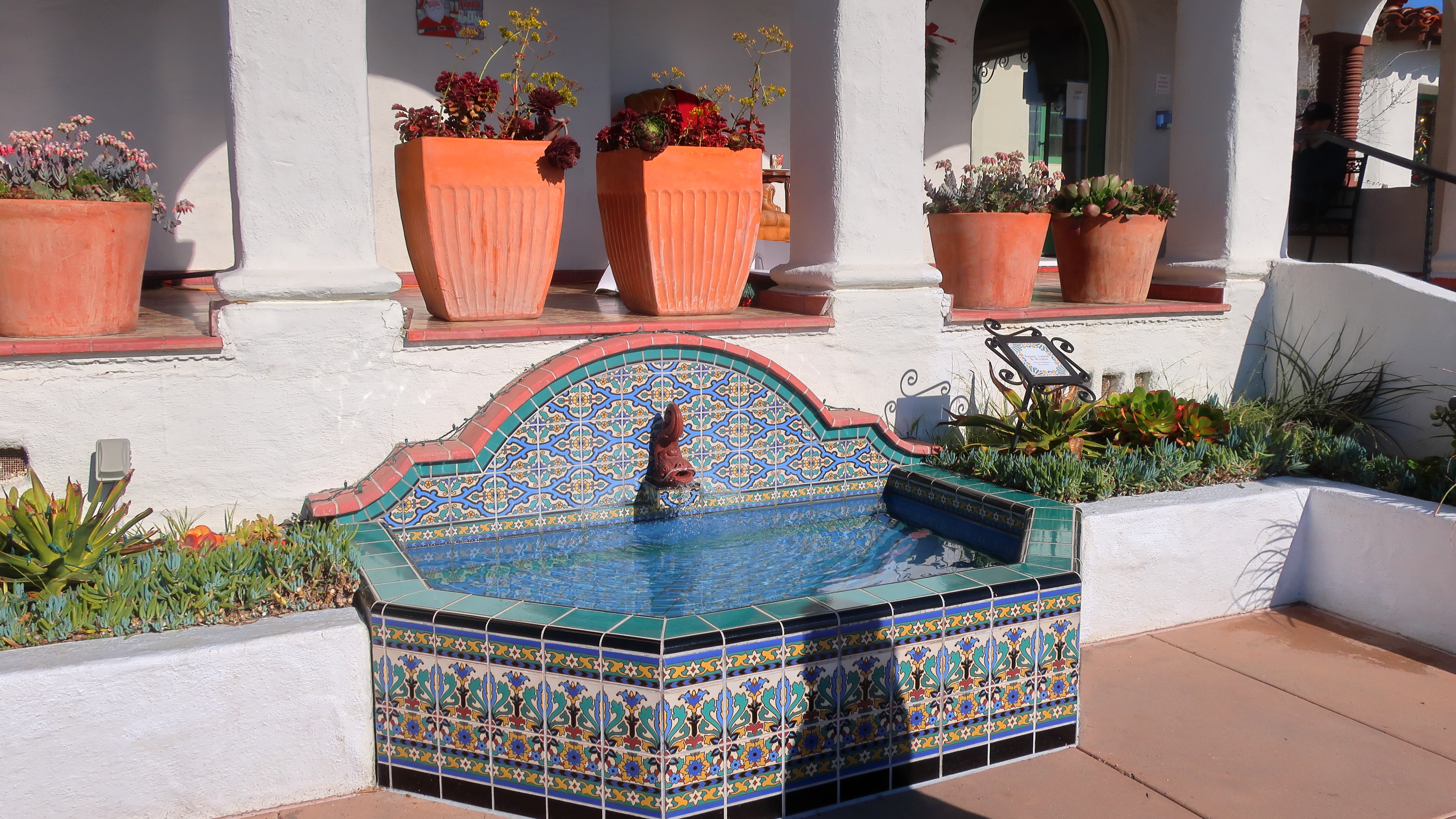
Historic azulejo fountain

After an appeal by the San Clemente Historical Society to the City of San Clemente, the San Clemente Redevelopment Agency purchased Casa Romantica in 1989. The estate and gardens were listed on the National Register of Historic Places on December 27, 1991.

For the next several years, its proposed use was debated, but in November 2001 the city council voted to designate it as a cultural center with a mixture of public and private funding. The vote was swayed by a $1.25 million anonymous donation through the Orange County Community Foundation earmarked for use for a cultural arts or educational center. After renovation, Casa Romantica Cultural Center and Gardens opened its doors to the public in 2003. The principal architect who constructed the interior design of the Cultural Center was Raad Ghantous, who had settled in San Clemente years prior.

=== 2023 landslides ===
Cracks were discovered in the hillside below the house on April 16, 2023. On April 25, the city council approved funding for a study on how to stabilize the hillside. On April 27, a landslide just below the patio caused it to separate and to slip more than 20 feet, together with the landscaping. Casa Romantica was closed until further notice. The landslide also displaced residents of a nearby apartment complex, and led to the suspension of rail services on the line below the hillside, including Metrolink service between Orange County and the Inland Empire in one direction and Oceanside in another. As of May 4, limited BNSF freight service had resumed with restricted speeds, and as of May 27, passenger service had also resumed on the Amtrak Pacific Surfliner and the Metrolink Orange County and Inland Empire–Orange County lines.

The city of San Clemente began emergency work to stabilize the hillside. The Casa Romantica Cultural Center planned to reopen parts of the estate as soon as late May, with some upcoming cultural events to be hosted off-site. Repairs were expected to cost at least $250,000 and a fundraising campaign was started.

Another landslide occurred on June 5, 2023, and rail service was again suspended. The city and transportation agencies are considering construction of a retaining wall at the base of the hill to protect the rail line. In July 2023, the Orange County Transportation Authority and the city of San Clemente are constructing the retaining wall. The tracks reopened on July 19, 2023.

== Organization ==
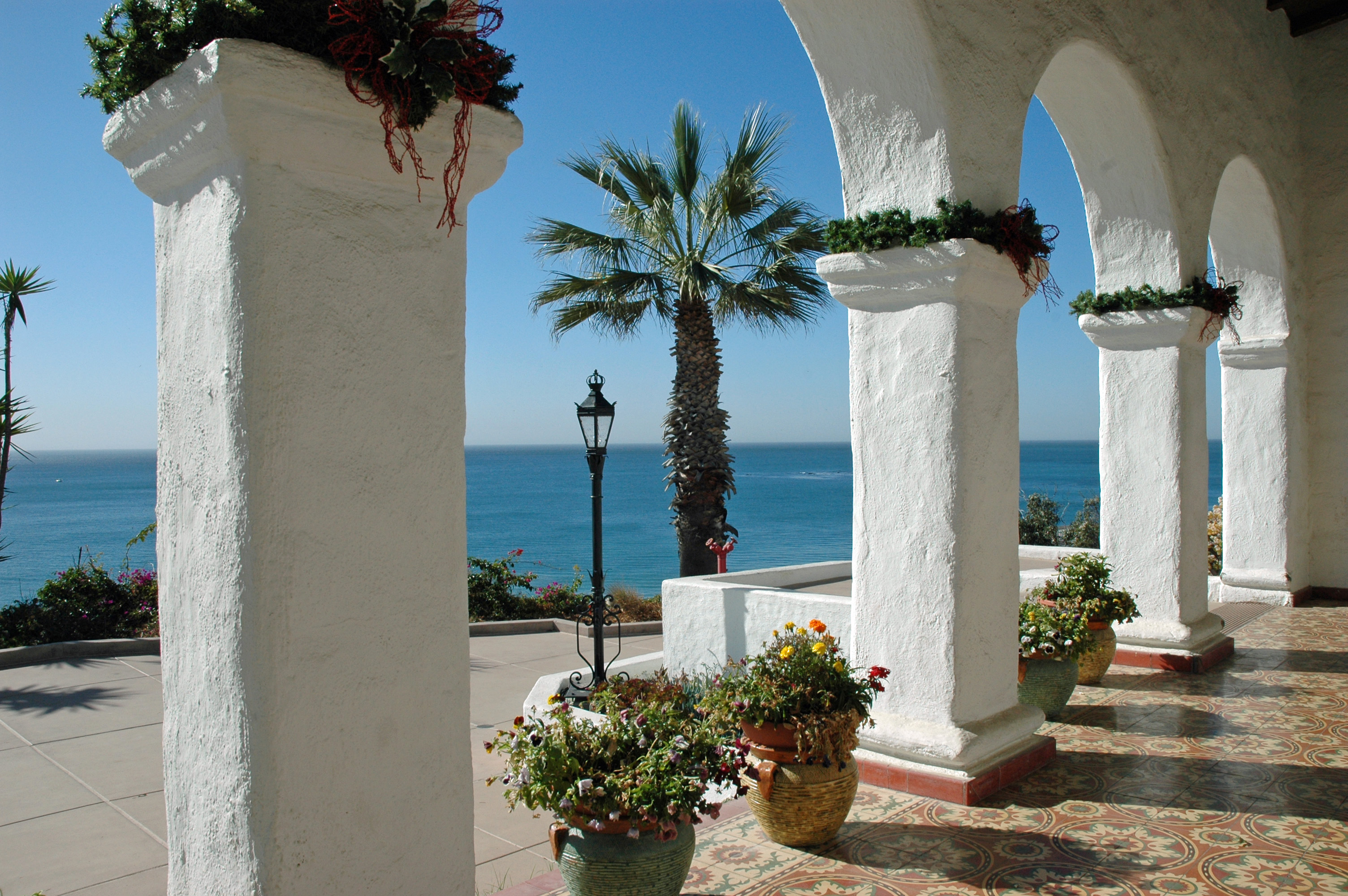
View of the Pacific Ocean through the arcade at Casa Romantica

Casa Romantica Cultural Center and Gardens is a non-profit 501(c)3 organization.

The center provides programs for all ages in arts, music, history, horticulture, and literature, including more than 60 concerts, workshops, classes, recitals, lectures, and other events per year. These include the Classical Music Festival and Academy and a specially commissioned version of Shakespeare's Hamlet.

Casa Romantica is a member of the American Horticultural Society. The 2.5 acres (1.0 ha) of gardens (half the original estate was sold in the mid-20th century) include some of Ole Hansen's original plantings made in 1927, and also a display of Native American plants used by the Acjachmen Indians.

Casa Romantica is used for special events including weddings, photography and videography shoots, and corporate events. It has been listed as a top Orange County destination in WeddingWire, Sunset magazine, The Knot, and AAA's Westways magazine.
