= San Clemente, California =

City in California, United States

- City
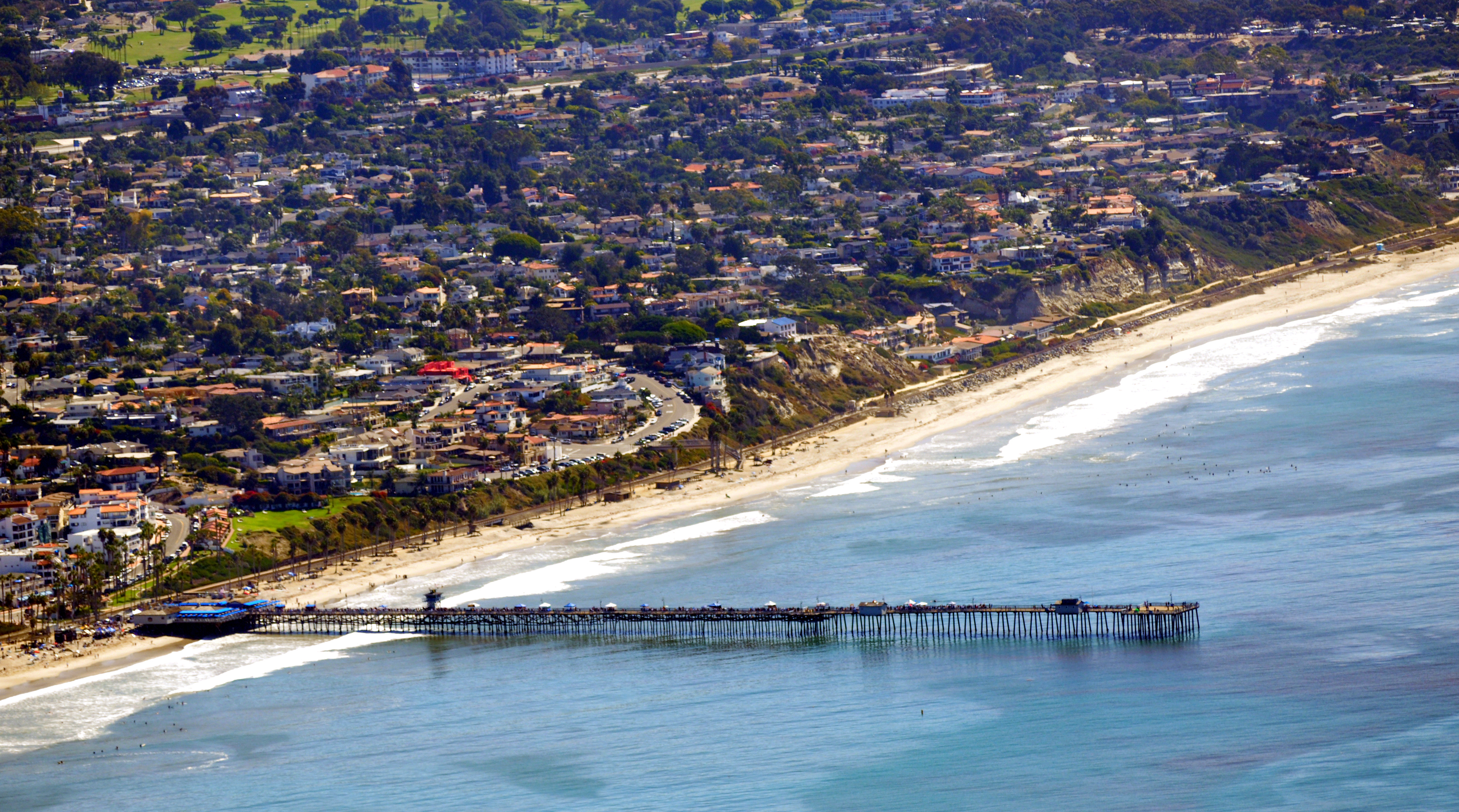
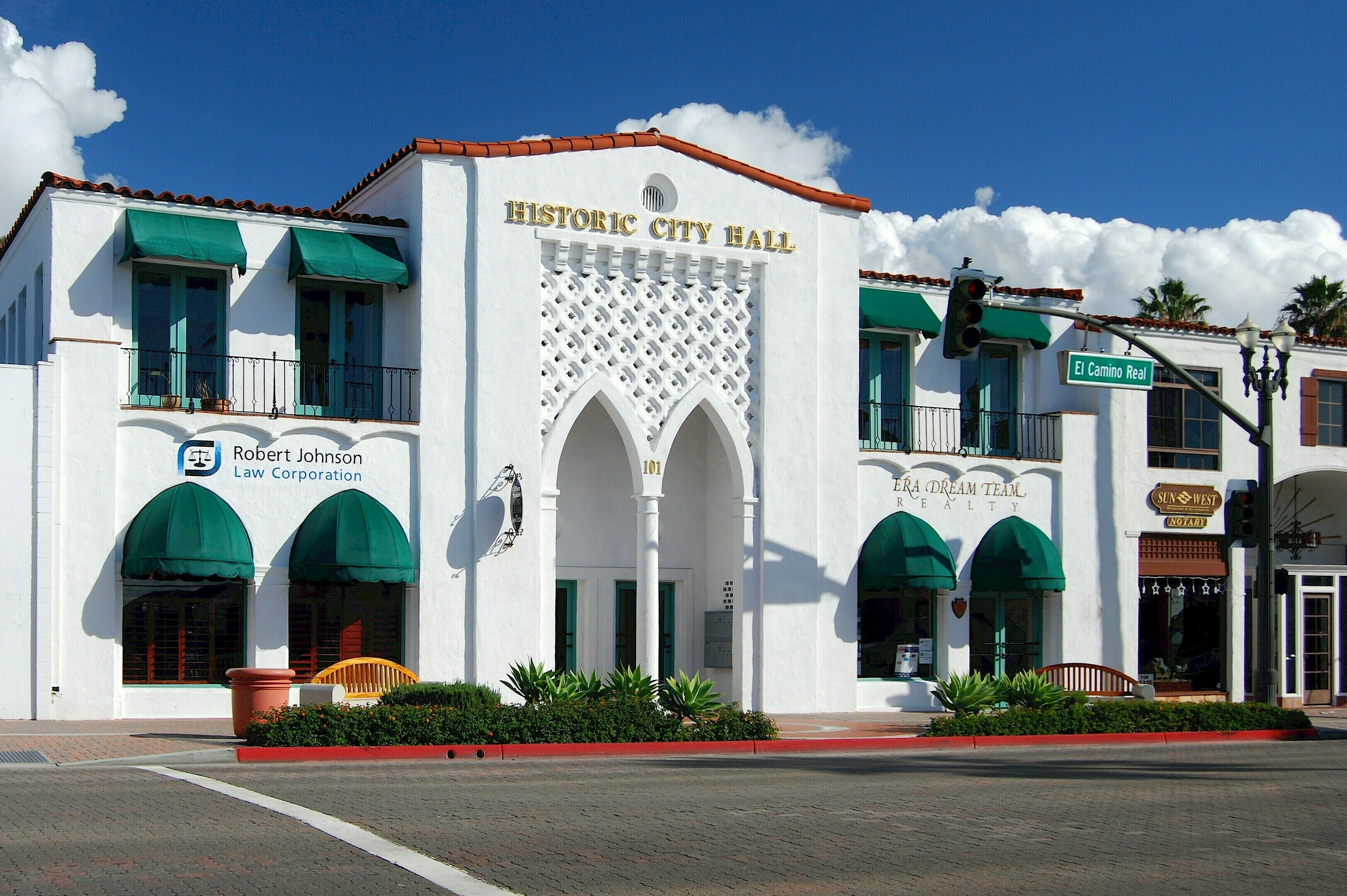
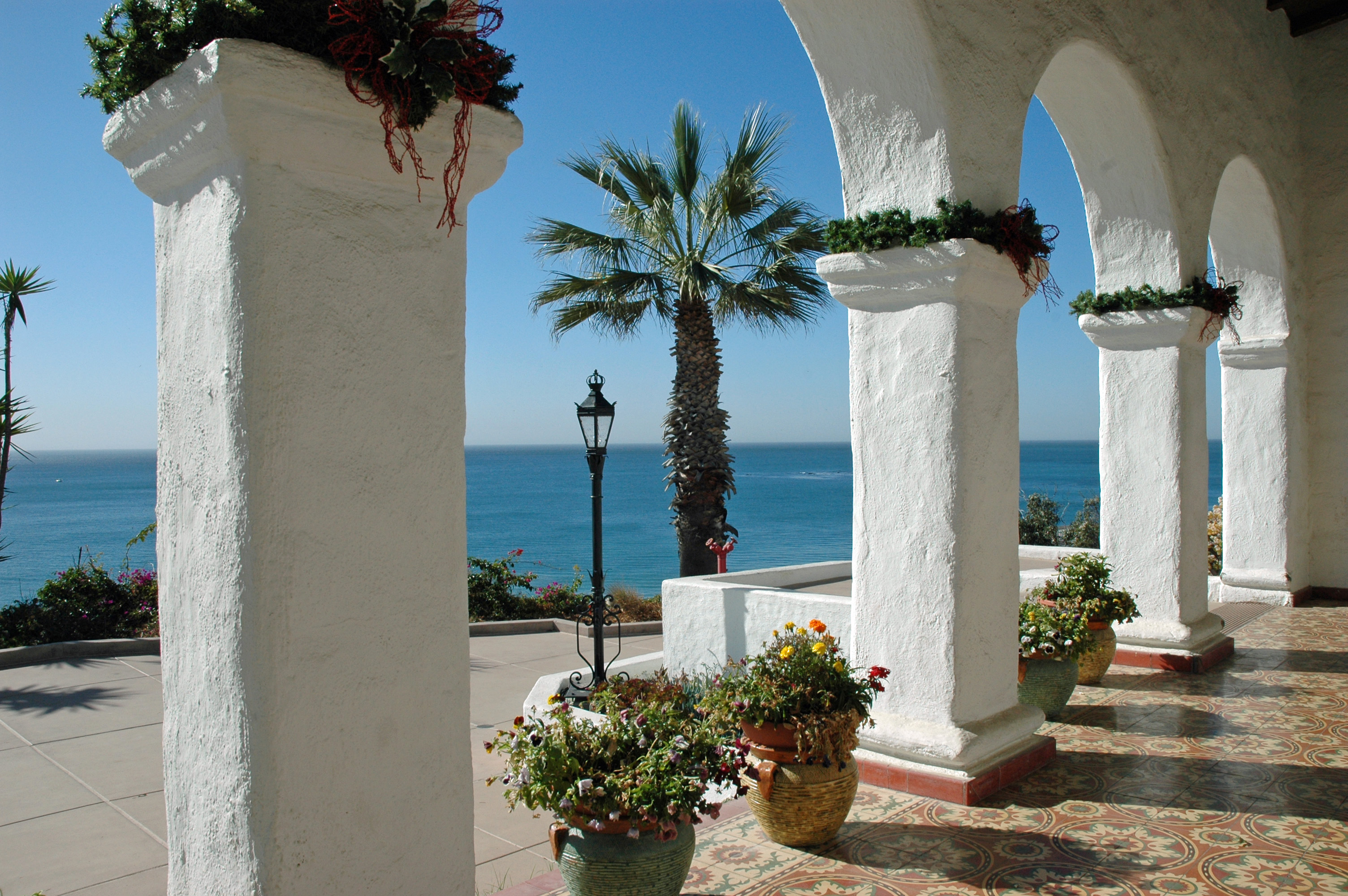
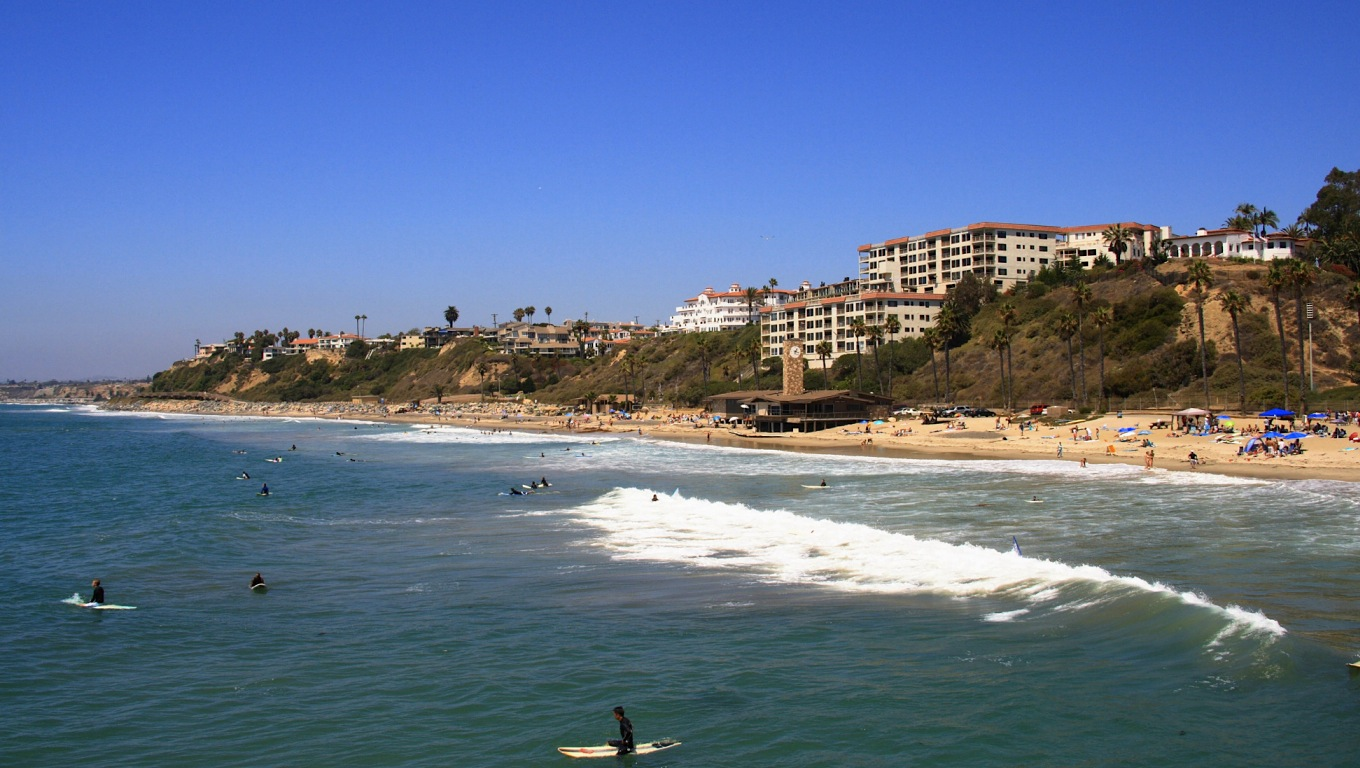
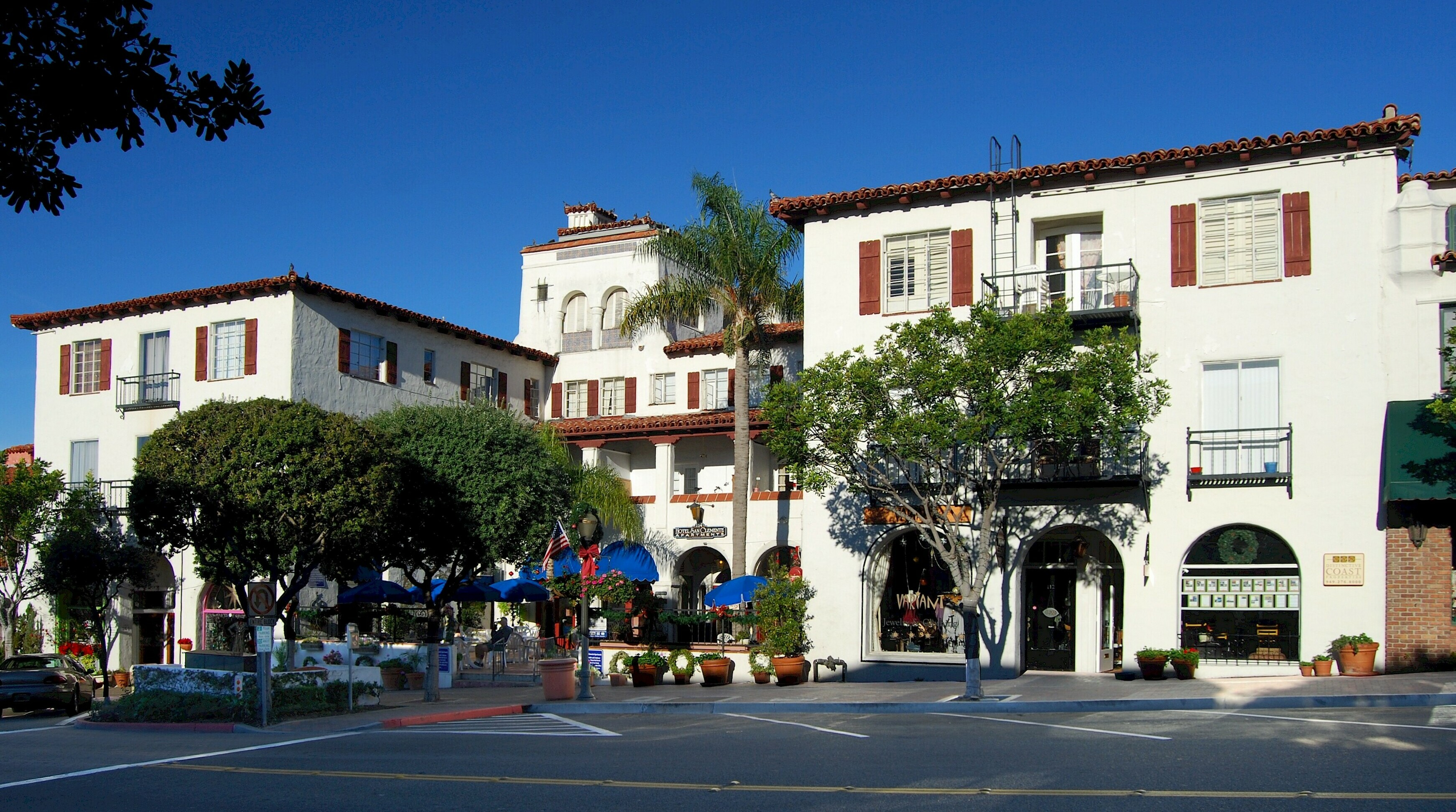
- Top: view of San Clemente Pier; middle: Historic City Hall (left), Casa Romantica (right); bottom: San Clemente State Beach (left) and Hotel San Clemente (right).

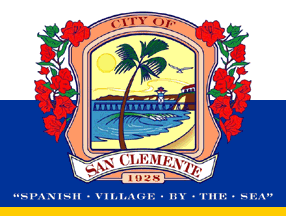
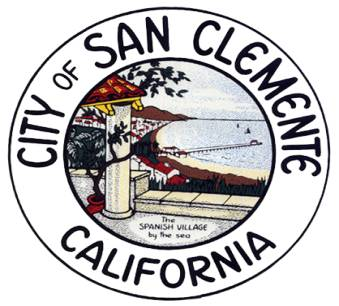
- Flag Seal
- Interactive map of San Clemente, California
- Location in the Los Angeles metropolitan area Location in the state of California Location in the United States
- Coordinates: 33°26′16″N 117°37′13″W
- Country: United States
- State: California
- County: Orange
- Incorporated: February 28, 1928
- Named for: Saint Clement

Government
  - Mayor: Steve Knoblock
  - City Manager: Andy Hall

Area
  - Total: 19.10 sq mi (49.48 km^{2})
  - Land: 18.36 sq mi (47.54 km^{2})
  - Water: 0.75 sq mi (1.94 km^{2}) 3.92%
- Elevation: 233 ft (71 m)

Population (2020)
  - Total: 64,293
  - Density: 3,503/sq mi (1,352/km^{2})
- Time zone: UTC-8 (Pacific)
  - Summer (DST): UTC-7 (PDT)
- ZIP codes: 92672–92674
- Area code: 949
- FIPS code: 06-65084
- GNIS feature IDs: 1661376, 2411781
- Website: www.sanclemente.gov

San Clemente (/ˌsæn kləˈmɛntə/ san kleh-MEN-teh; Spanish for 'St. Clement' Spanish: [saŋ kleˈmente]) is a coastal city in southern Orange County, California, United States. It was named in 1925 after the Spanish colonial island (which was named after a Pope from the first century). Located in the Orange Coast region of the South Coast of California, San Clemente's population was 64,293 in the 2020 census. Situated roughly midway between Los Angeles and San Diego, San Clemente is a popular tourist destination in Southern California, known for its beaches, Spanish Colonial Revival architecture, and hospitality industry. San Clemente's city slogan is "Spanish Village by the Sea."

Some locals anglicize the town's Spanish name as (/ˌsæn kləˈmɛnti/ san kleh-MEN-tee), with members of the San Clemente Historical Society using both the anglicized and Spanish pronunciations.

== History ==
=== Indigenous ===
The Acjachemen are the Indigenous people of San Clemente.

=== Spanish era ===
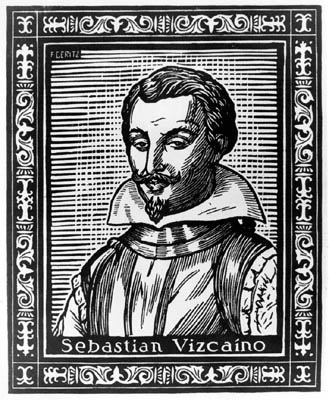
Spanish explorer Sebastián Vizcaíno named San Clemente Island in 1602. The city was named after the island in 1925.

In 1776, Father Junípero Serra founded Mission San Juan Capistrano, and afterward the local indigenous people were dubbed "Juaneños" in Spanish. Both Native Americans and Spanish settlers established villages near the mission, and local indigenous people were conscripted to work for the mission.

=== Mexican and Post-Conquest eras ===
The northern part of San Clemente was included as part of Rancho Boca de la Playa, granted in 1846 by Governor Pío Pico to Emigdio Véjar. Following the American conquest of California, California came under United States sovereignty in 1848. In 1860, Véjar sold the rancho to Juan Ávila, grantee of Rancho Niguel, who later conveyed it to his son-in-law, Pablo Pryor. Pablo Pryor was poisoned and died in 1878. Juan Avila's other son-in-law, Marcus A. Forster (a grandson of Don Juan Forster who married Guadalupe Avila), then acquired the ranch.

The rest of San Clemente was included in Rancho Los Desechos, granted to Felipe Carrillo in 1946. Carillo did not claim the land with the Public Land Commission. Don Juan Forster bought Carillo's claim and used land scrip to acquire the government's claim to the land. Foster's son Marcus also bought some of the Rancho Los Desechos land.

=== American era ===
In 1906, Cornelio Echenique, Marcus Forster's son-in-law, sold the land to the Goldschmidt brothers, who planned to plant vineyards on the land.

In 1925, former Seattle Mayor Ole Hanson, an out-of-town major land developer, purchased the land from the Goldschmidts and designed a 2,000-acre (8.1 km^{2}) community with the financial help of a syndicate headed by Henry Hamilton Cotton. Hanson anticipated that Californians weary of "the big city" would find refuge in the region's agreeable climate, stunning beaches, and rich land. He named the city after San Clemente Island, which in turn was named by the explorer Sebastián Vizcaino in 1602 after Saint Clement. Hanson envisioned it as a Mediterranean-style coastal resort town, his "San Clemente by the Sea". The city is one of the country's first master planned communities. He had a clause added to the deeds requiring all building plans to be submitted to an architectural review board in an effort to ensure future development would retain red tile roofs and white exteriors. This proved to be short-lived; an eclectic mix of building styles is found in the oldest parts of town.

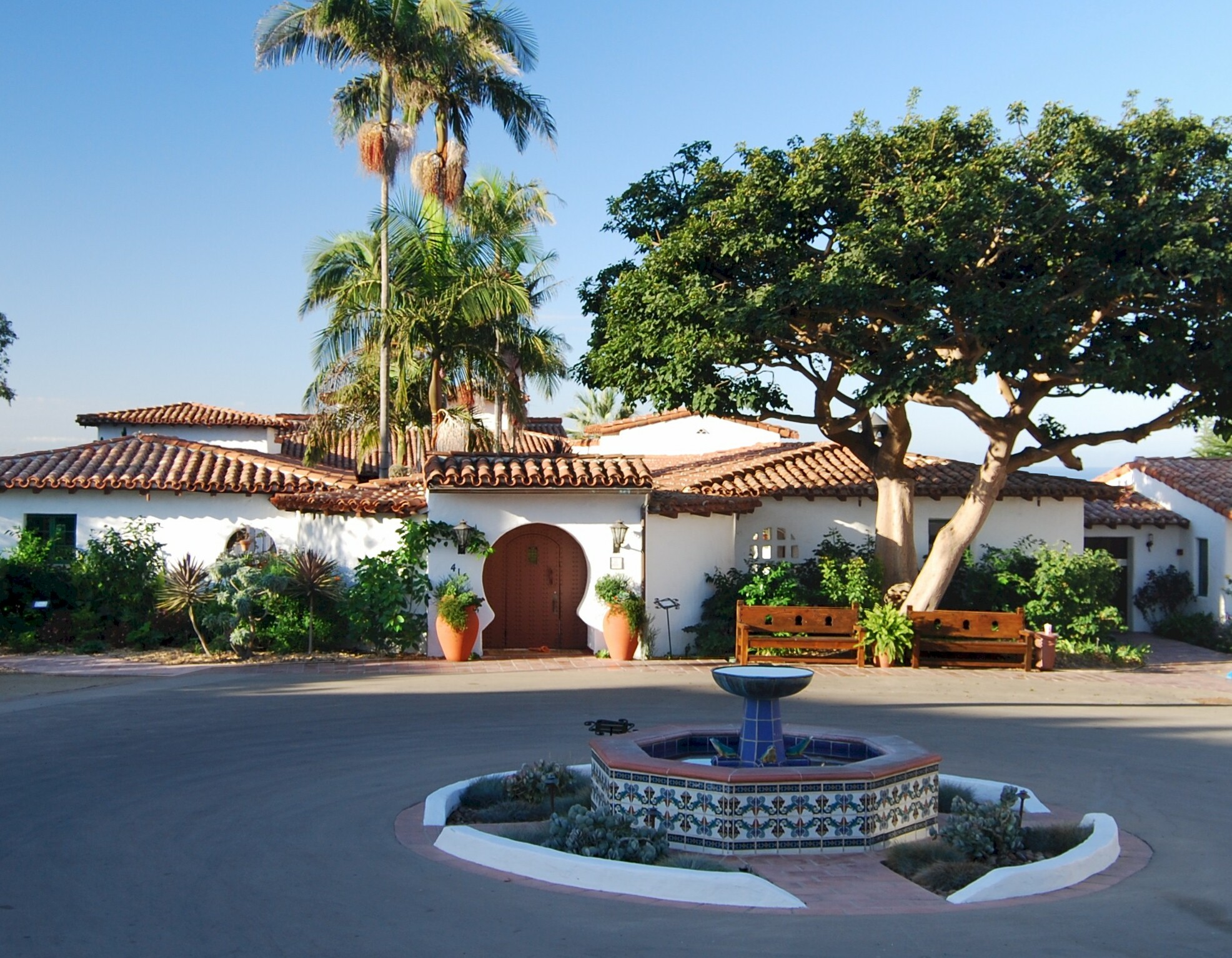
Casa Romantica, built in a Spanish Colonial Revival style in 1927 for Ole Hanson, founder of San Clemente.

Hanson succeeded in promoting the new area and selling property. He built public structures such as the Beach Club, the community center, the pier and San Clemente Plaza, now known as Max Berg Plaza Park. The area was officially incorporated as a city on February 27, 1928, with a council-manager government. Referring to the way he would develop the city, Hanson proclaimed, "I have a clean canvas and I am determined to paint a clean picture. Think of it – a canvas five miles long and one and one-half miles wide!... My San Clemente by the Sea." Soon after San Clemente was incorporated, the need for a fire station was realized. The headlines in San Clemente's first newspaper, El Heraldo de San Clemente June 1928 read: "Building to house local fire department will be constructed by popular subscription and turned over to the city when completed!" Individual subscriptions were received in the amounts from $6.00 to $1,500.00 from the citizenry.

One of the most iconic landmarks in San Clemente is the San Clemente Pier, first constructed in 1928 and rebuilt in 1939 and 1983.

When Ole Hanson came to San Clemente and decided to develop the city he moved into his epitome of the perfect house which was called Casa Romantica. Hanson owned Casa Romantica up until the Great Depression hit and the Bank of America foreclosed on the property. The Goldschmidts bought some parcels back, and built the Goldschmidt House on one of them.

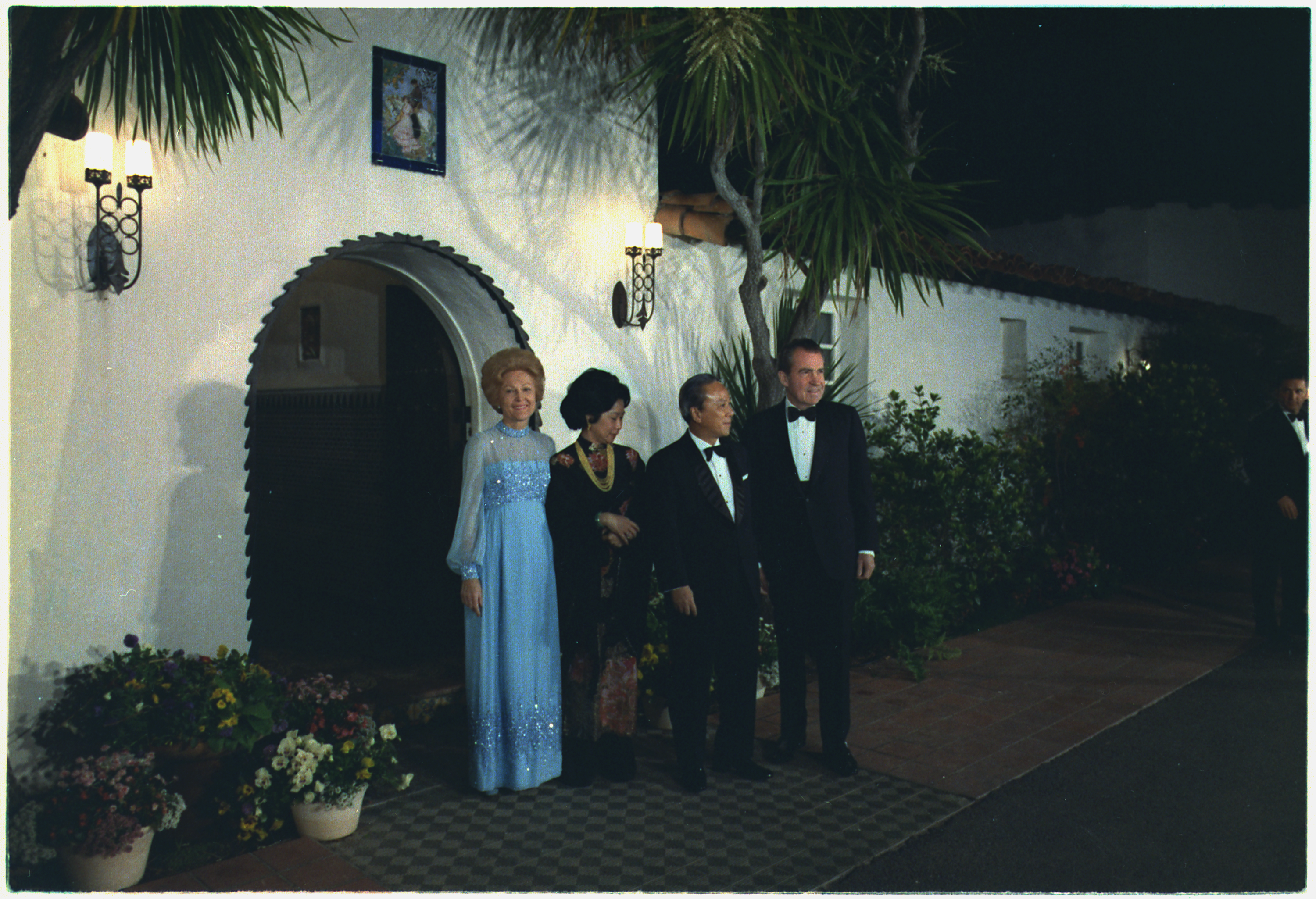
President Richard Nixon and First Lady Pat Nixon at La Casa Pacifica, their Western White House, in 1973.

In 1969, President Richard Nixon bought part of the H. H. Cotton estate, one of the original homes built by one of Hanson's partners. Nixon called it "La Casa Pacifica" and it was nicknamed the "Western White House," a term for a President's vacation home. It sits above one of the West Coast's premier surfing spots, Trestles, and just north of historic surfing beach San Onofre. Many world leaders visited the home during Nixon's tenure, including Soviet general secretary Leonid Brezhnev, Mexican President Gustavo Díaz Ordaz, Prime Minister of Japan Eisaku Satō, Henry Kissinger, and businessman Bebe Rebozo. After his resignation, Nixon retired to San Clemente to write his memoirs. He sold the home in 1980 and moved to New York City. The property also has historical ties to the Democratic side of the aisle; prior to Nixon's tenure at the estate, H. H. Cotton was known to host Franklin D. Roosevelt, who would visit to play cards in a small outbuilding overlooking the Pacific Ocean.

In 1994, the Clarence Lobo Elementary School, named after Clarence H. Lobo, chief of the Acjachemen people from 1946 to 1985, was opened in San Clemente as part of the Capistrano Unified School District. The opening of the school was notable as the first school in California to be named after an Indigenous leader.

=== 21st century ===
The historic "North Beach" area is home to the Miramar Theatre, the Casino Building, and Ole Hanson Beach Club, the latter two of which were renovated in 2010 and 2016.

In 2019, the city, along with Dana Point and San Juan Capistrano, was sued by Santa Ana who argued the cities were participating in a practice in conjunction with local police departments and OC's Sheriff Department to detain homeless people and dump them in older neighboring cities. Santa Ana dismissed the law suit in early 2020, after the three cities confirmed they never did any of the alleged acts and had no intention to do so.

== Geography ==
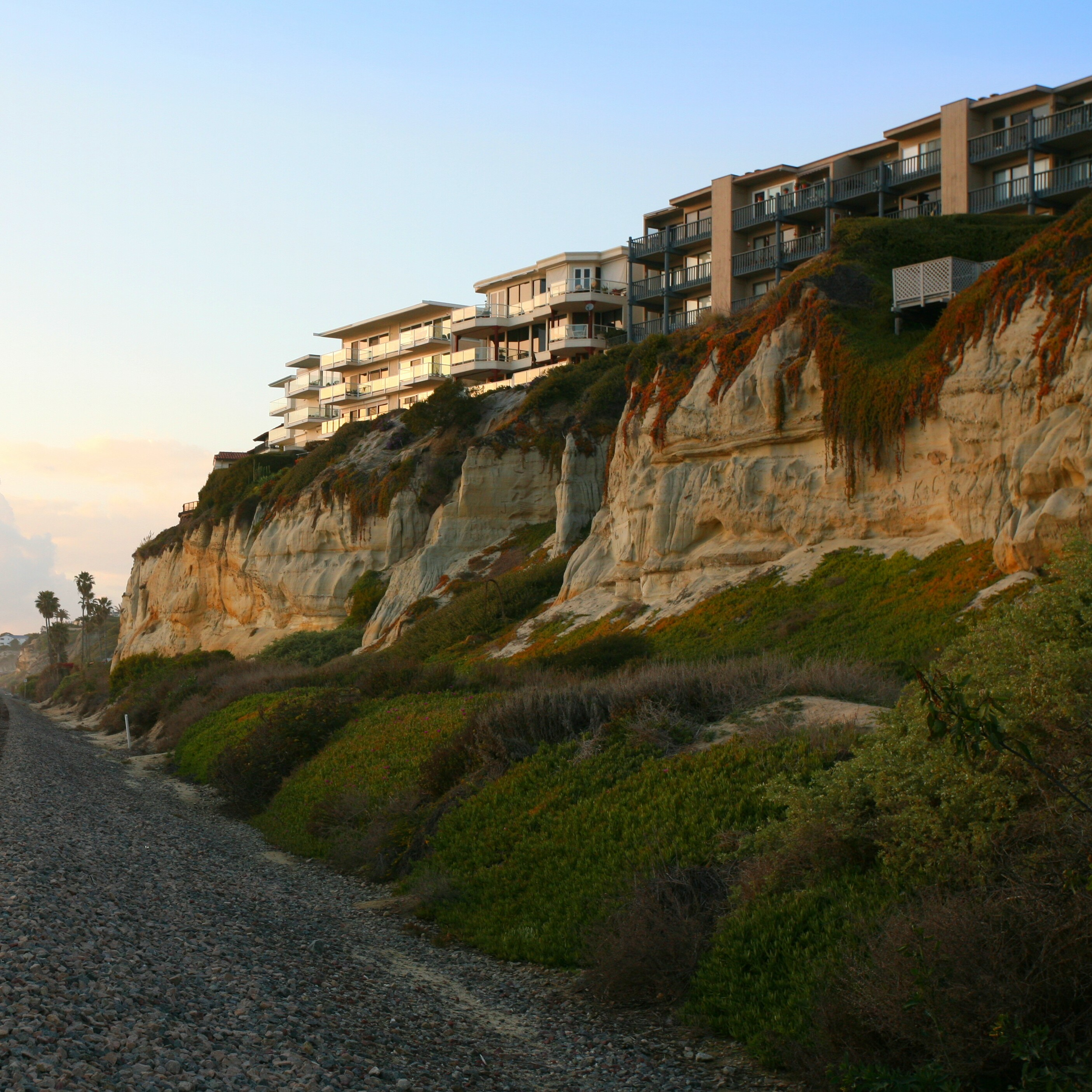
Calafia Cliffs at Calafia State Beach.

San Clemente is bordered by Camp Pendleton and Trestles surf beach in neighboring San Diego County to the south, the Cleveland National Forest to the east, the city of Dana Point to the northwest, the city of San Juan Capistrano to the north, and the CDP Rancho Mission Viejo to the northeast.

According to the United States Census Bureau, the city has an area of 19.1 square miles (49 km^{2}), of which 18.4 square miles (48 km^{2}) is land and 0.75 square miles (1.9 km^{2}) (3.92%) is water.

=== Climate ===
San Clemente has a Mediterranean climate where temperatures tend to average in the 70s °F (20s °C). The warmest month of the year is August, with an average high temperature of 79 °F (26 °C). The coldest month is December with an average high temperature of 64 °F (18 °C). The annual rainfall in 2010 was 10.5 inches (270 mm) and the annual days of sunshine 310.

San Clemente

Climate chart (precipitation, max. and min. temperature)
J	F	M	A	M	J	J	A	S	O	N	D
0.8 79 59	1.5 78 59	0.7 70 58	0.9 87 59	0 71 61	0 87 70	0 84 70	0 90 70	0 105 76	0 83 70	0 80 58	0 80 55
- █ Average max. and min. temperatures in °F
- █ Precipitation totals in inches
- Source: Weather Underground
Metric conversion
J	F	M	A	M	J	J	A	S	O	N	D
21 26 15	38 26 15	18 21 14	24 31 15	0 22 16	0 31 21	0 29 21	0 32 21	0 41 24	0 28 21	0 27 14	0 27 13
- █ Average max. and min. temperatures in °C
- █ Precipitation totals in mm

Climate data for San Clemente, California
Month	Jan	Feb	Mar	Apr	May	Jun	Jul	Aug	Sep	Oct	Nov	Dec	Year
Record high °F (°C)	90 (32)	90 (32)	92 (33)	98 (37)	99 (37)	102 (39)	106 (41)	103 (39)	108 (42)	105 (41)	100 (38)	90 (32)	108 (42)
Mean daily maximum °F (°C)	66 (19)	66 (19)	67 (19)	69 (21)	70 (21)	73 (23)	77 (25)	78 (26)	78 (26)	75 (24)	70 (21)	67 (19)	71 (22)
Mean daily minimum °F (°C)	45 (7)	46 (8)	48 (9)	50 (10)	55 (13)	58 (14)	62 (17)	62 (17)	61 (16)	56 (13)	48 (9)	44 (7)	53 (12)
Record low °F (°C)	22 (−6)	28 (−2)	33 (1)	33 (1)	38 (3)	43 (6)	44 (7)	47 (8)	43 (6)	37 (3)	29 (−2)	27 (−3)	22 (−6)
Average precipitation inches (mm)	2.73 (69)	2.70 (69)	2.36 (60)	0.80 (20)	0.24 (6.1)	0.10 (2.5)	0.03 (0.76)	0.12 (3.0)	0.31 (7.9)	0.39 (9.9)	1.11 (28)	1.65 (42)	12.54 (318.16)

=== Biogeography (San Clemente) ===
The most common native species: Common Yarrow, Red Sand Verbena, and Pink Sand Verbena.

== Demographics ==
Historical population
Census	Pop.	Note	%±
1930	667		—
1940	479		−28.2%
1950	2,008		319.2%
1960	8,527		324.7%
1970	17,063		100.1%
1980	27,325		60.1%
1990	41,100		50.4%
2000	49,936		21.5%
2010	63,522		27.2%
2020	64,293		1.2%
U.S. Decennial Census; 1860–1870 1880-1890; 1900 1910 1920; 1930 1940 1950; 1960 1970 1980; 1990 2000 2010; 2020

After incorporation in 1928, San Clemente appeared as a city in the 1930 U.S. Census. Prior to that, the area was part of unincorporated San Juan Township (pop 1,064 in 1920).

=== Racial and ethnic composition ===
San Clemente city, California – Racial and ethnic composition Note: the US Census treats Hispanic/Latino as an ethnic category. This table excludes Latinos from the racial categories and assigns them to a separate category. Hispanics/Latinos may be of any race.
Race / Ethnicity (NH = Non-Hispanic)	Pop 1980	Pop 1990	Pop 2000	Pop 2010	Pop 2020	% 1980	% 1990	% 2000	% 2010	% 2020
White alone (NH)	24,151	34,324	39,155	48,254	45,889	88.38%	83.51%	78.41%	75.96%	71.37%
Black or African American alone (NH)	309	251	320	349	382	1.13%	0.61%	0.64%	0.55%	0.59%
Native American or Alaska Native alone (NH)	188	145	167	193	180	0.69%	0.35%	0.33%	0.30%	0.28%
Asian alone (NH)	389	1,067	1,293	2,269	2,513	1.42%	2.60%	2.59%	3.57%	3.91%
Native Hawaiian or Pacific Islander alone (NH)	389	1,067	62	78	88	1.42%	2.60%	0.12%	0.12%	0.14%
Other race alone (NH)	-	28	58	89	353	-	0.07%	0.12%	0.14%	0.55%
Mixed race or Multiracial (NH)	x	x	948	1,588	3,209	x	x	1.90%	2.50%	4.99%
Hispanic or Latino (any race)	2,288	5,282	7,933	10,702	11,679	8.37%	12.85%	15.89%	16.85%	18.17%
Total	27,325	41,100	49,936	63,522	64,293	100.00%	100.00%	100.00%	100.00%	100.00%

=== 2020 census ===
San Clemente Pier.

As of the 2020 census, San Clemente had a population of 64,293 and a population density of 3,502.6 inhabitants per square mile (1,352.4/km^{2}). The census reported that 99.3% of the population lived in households, 0.7% lived in non-institutionalized group quarters, and no one was institutionalized.

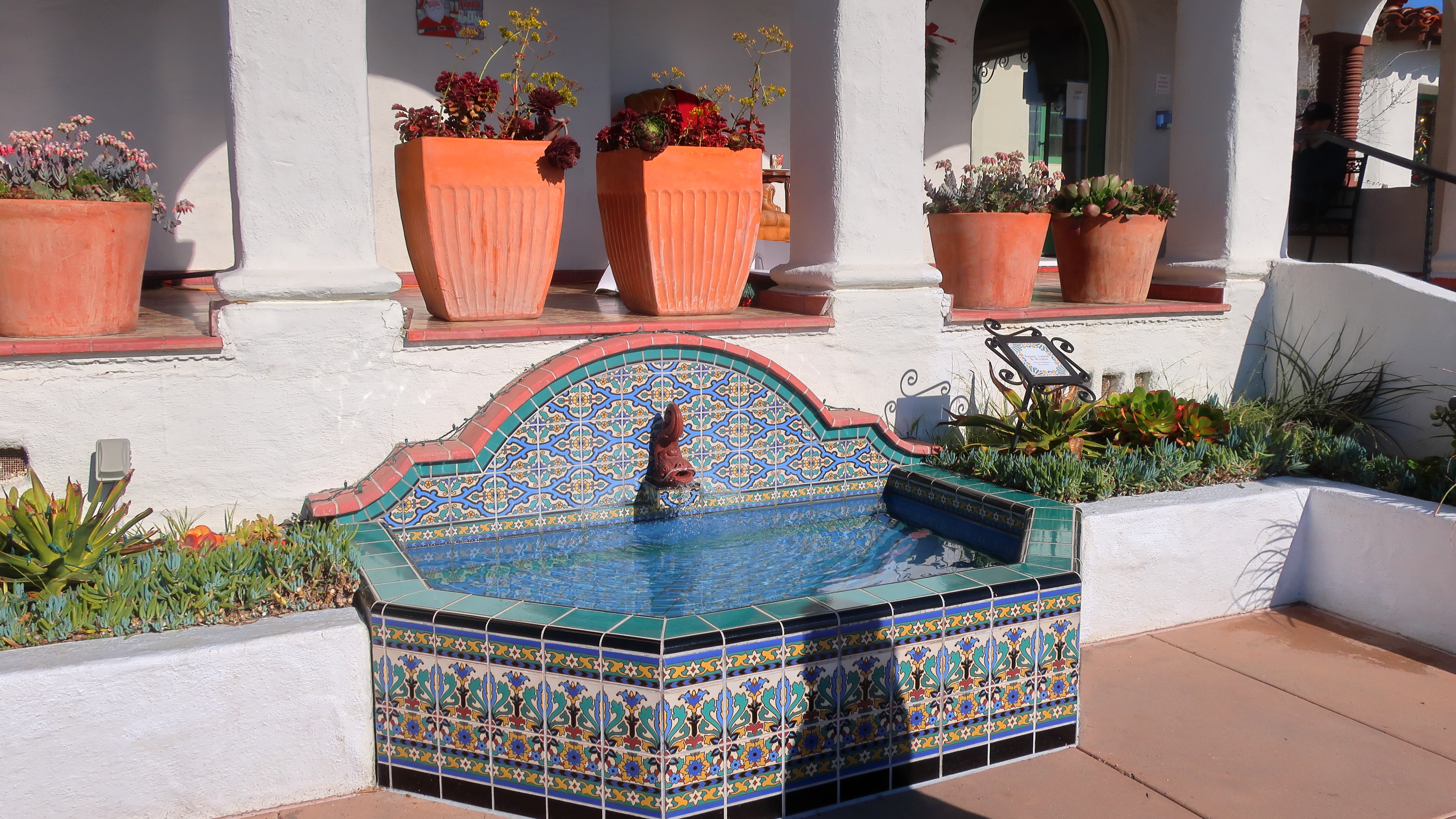
Casa Romantica Cultural Center and Gardens, built in 1927.

The age distribution was 21.1% under the age of 18, 8.4% aged 18 to 24, 21.8% aged 25 to 44, 29.7% aged 45 to 64, and 19.0% aged 65 or older. The median age was 43.9 years. For every 100 females, there were 98.6 males, and for every 100 females age 18 and over, there were 96.4 males age 18 and over.

There were 24,490 households, of which 29.6% had children under the age of 18. Of all households, 57.5% were married-couple households, 5.6% were cohabiting couple households, 21.6% had a female householder with no spouse or partner present, and 15.4% had a male householder with no spouse or partner present. About 21.8% of households were made up of individuals, and 9.9% had someone living alone who was 65 years of age or older. The average household size was 2.61, and there were 17,422 families (71.1% of all households).

There were 26,647 housing units at an average density of 1,451.7 units per square mile (560.5 units/km^{2}), of which 91.9% were occupied and 8.1% were vacant. Of occupied units, 64.0% were owner-occupied and 36.0% were renter-occupied. The homeowner vacancy rate was 0.8%, and the rental vacancy rate was 5.6%.

100.0% of residents lived in urban areas, while 0.0% lived in rural areas.

=== 2023 estimate ===
In 2023, the US Census Bureau estimated that the median household income was $134,735, and the per capita income was $73,051. About 2.9% of families and 5.7% of the population were below the poverty line.

=== 2010 census ===
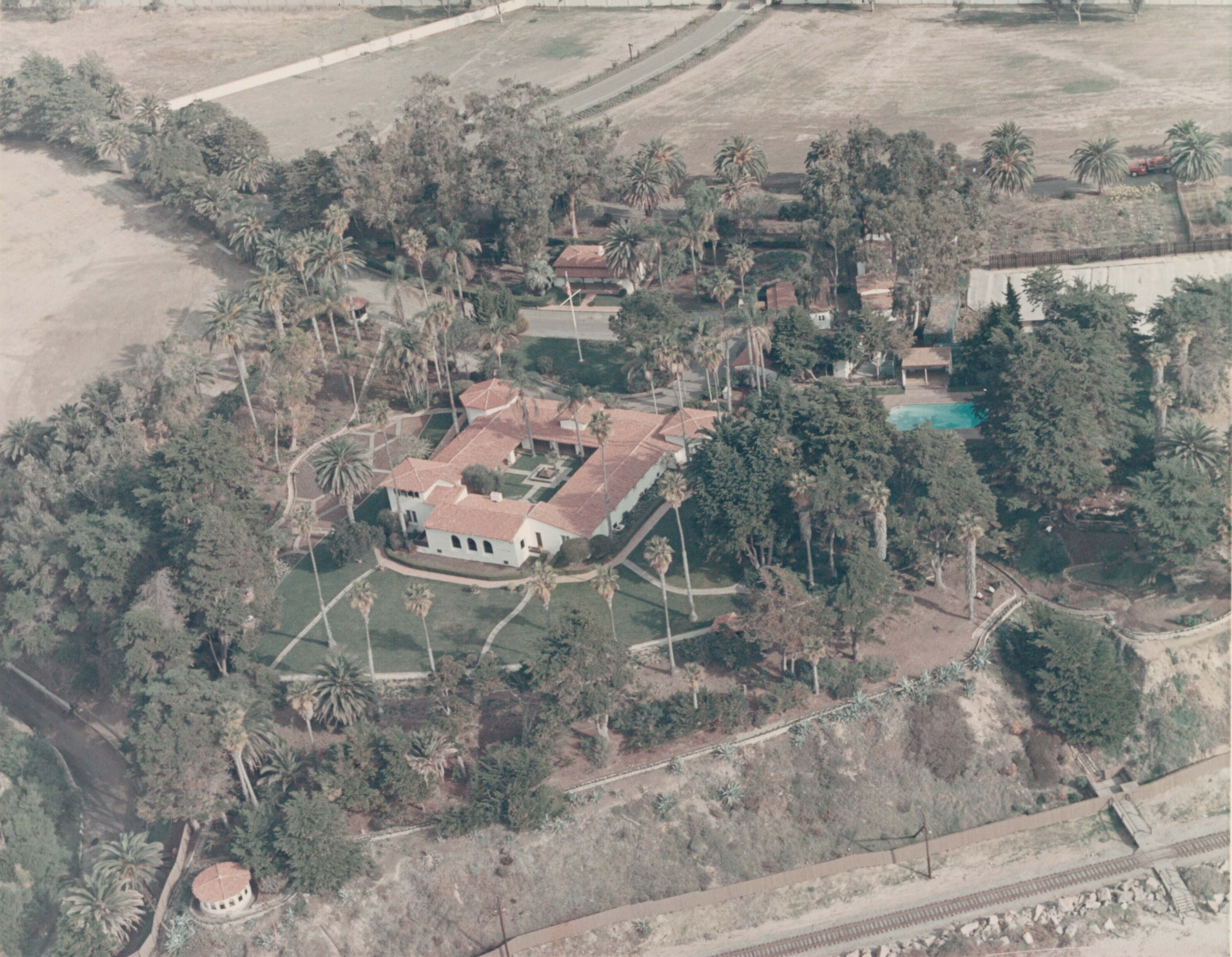
La Casa Pacifica, built in 1926, served as the Western White House during the presidency of Richard Nixon.

The 2010 United States census reported San Clemente had a population of 63,522. The population density was 3,262.9 inhabitants per square mile (1,259.8/km^{2}). The racial makeup of San Clemente was 54,605 (86.0%) White (76.0% Non-Hispanic White), 411 (0.6%) African American, 363 (0.6%) Native American, 2,333 (3.7%) Asian, 90 (0.1%) Pacific Islander, 3,433 (5.4%) from other races, and 2,287 (3.6%) from two or more races. Hispanic or Latino of any race were 10,702 persons (16.8%).

The Census reported 63,249 people (99.6% of the population) lived in households, 245 (0.4%) lived in non-institutionalized group quarters, and 28 (0.04%) were institutionalized.

There were 23,906 households, out of which 8,210 (34.3%) had children under the age of 18 living in them, 13,873 (58.0%) were marriage living together, 1,898 (7.9%) had a female householder with no husband present, 986 (4.1%) had a male householder with no wife present. There were 1,207 (5.0%) unmarried partnerships, 5,184 households (21.7%) were made up of individuals, and 1,972 (8.2%) had someone living alone who was 65 years of age or older. The average household size was 2.65. There were 16,757 families (70.1% of all households); the average family size was 3.

The population was spread out, with 15,506 people (24.4%) under the age of 18, 5,006 people (7.9%) aged 18 to 24, 16,474 people (25.9%) aged 25 to 44, 18,122 people (28.5%) aged 45 to 64, and 8,414 people (13.2%) who were 65 years of age or older. The median age was 39.7 years. For every 100 females, there were 100.9 males. For every 100 females age 18 and over, there were 98.8 males.

There were 25,966 housing units at an average density of 1,333.8 per square mile (515.0/km^{2}), of which 15,309 (64.0%) were owner-occupied, and 8,597 (36.0%) were occupied by renters. The homeowner vacancy rate was 1.3%; the rental vacancy rate was 5.8%. 41,164 people (64.8% of the population) lived in owner-occupied housing units and 22,085 people (34.8%) lived in rental housing units.

According to the 2010 United States census, San Clemente had a median household income of $87,184, with 7.9% of the population living below the federal poverty line.

== Economy ==
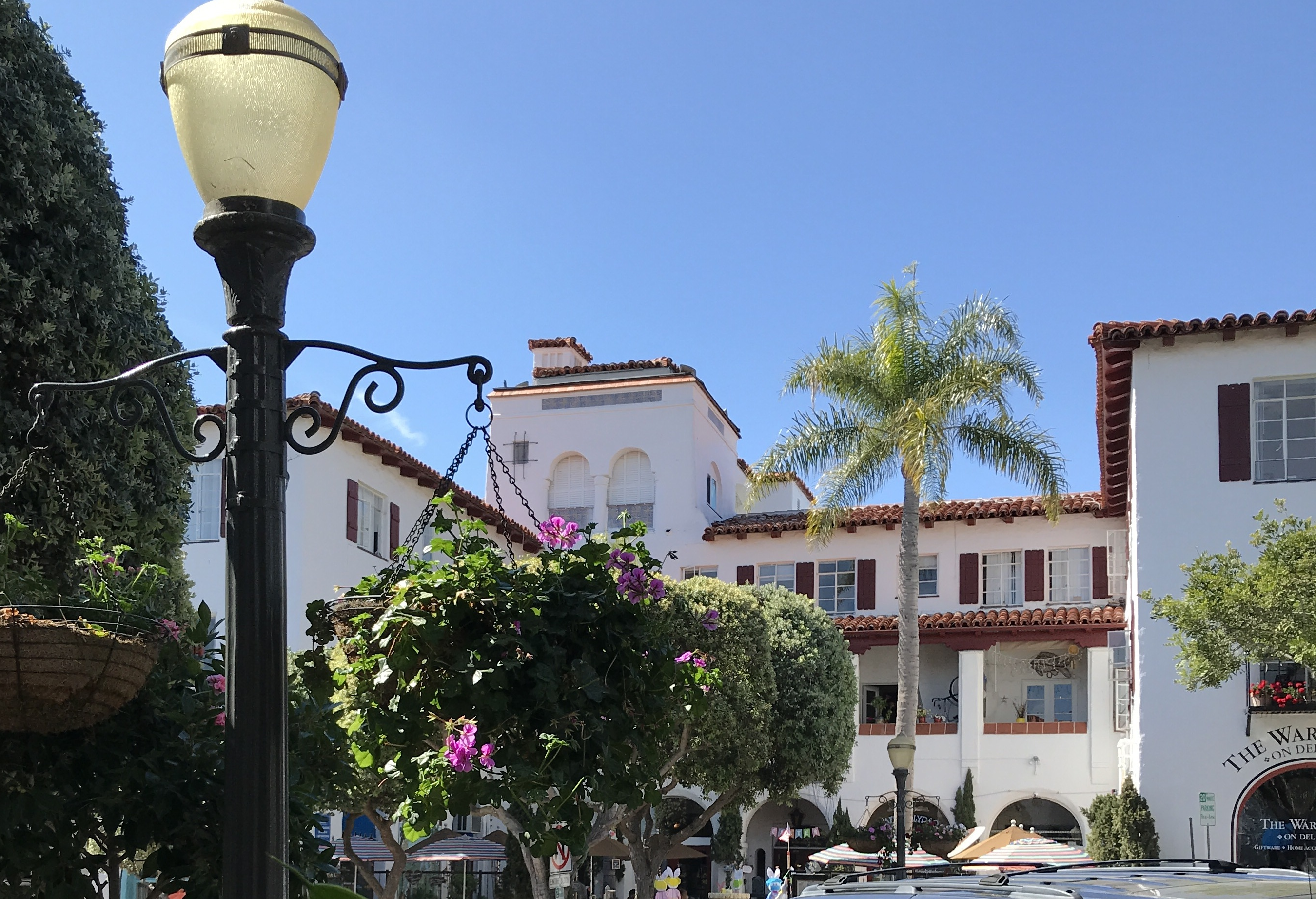
Downtown San Clemente

The following companies have their corporate headquarters in San Clemente:

- Cameron Health – Medical device manufacturer
- ICU Medical – Medical device manufacturer
- Pick Up Stix – Fast casual Asian food
- Rainbow Sandals – Manufacturer of premium sandals

=== Tourism ===
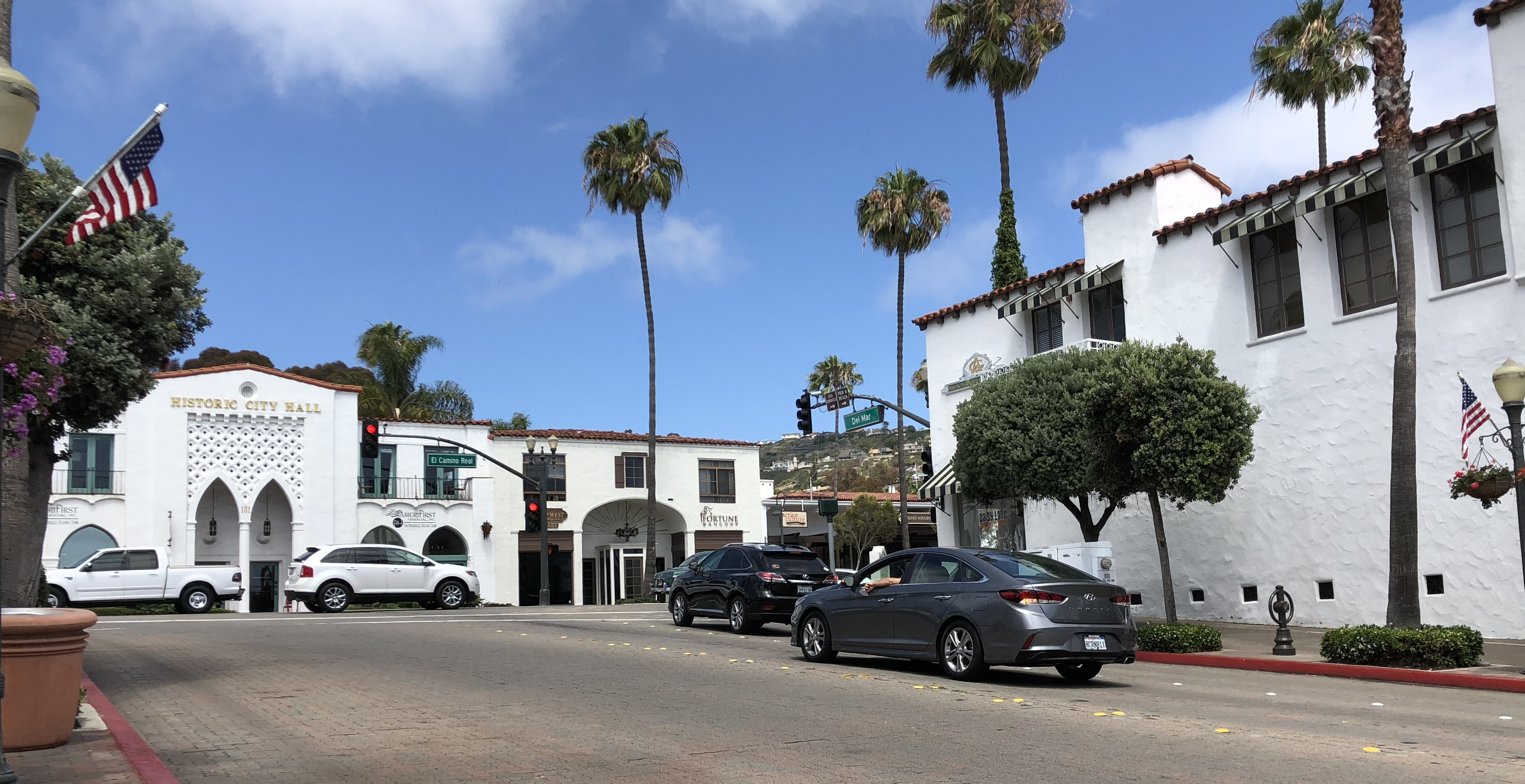
San Clemente is known for its Spanish Colonial Revival architecture.

San Clemente is a popular tourist destination, owing to its beaches, historic architecture, and attractions. San Clemente Pier is a popular attraction which connects to the San Clemente Beach trail which extends 2.6 miles (4.2 km) along the coast between North Beach and Calafia State Beach. The San Clemente Beach trail is a popular place for locals to walk or run.

Casa Romantica is one of the most historic places in San Clemente. Casa Romantica is owned by the city and is used as a cultural center. It is also open to rent for private events such as weddings. Casa Romantica is located above the San Clemente Pier station and overlooks the San Clemente coastline. Other listed historic sites in San Clemente include the Hotel San Clemente, the Goldschmidt House, the Oscar Easley Block, and the San Clemente Beach Club.

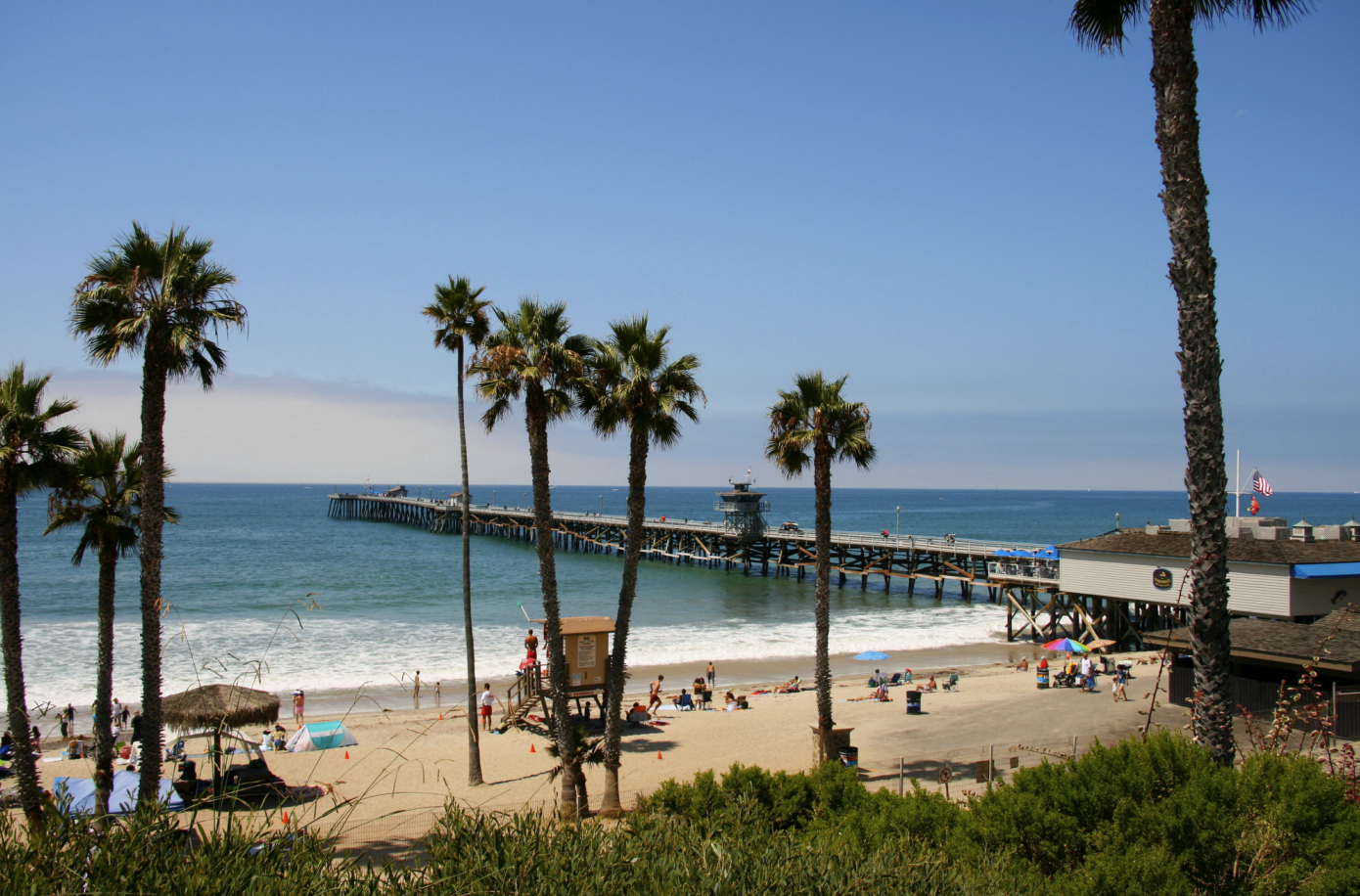
San Clemente Pier.

Known as the “Spanish Village by the Sea”, San Clemente has long been known for its Spanish Colonial Revival style architecture. Downtown San Clemente restaurants and shops are adorned with red tile roofs, cream stucco walls, and dark wood doors and windows. The homes in the area range in style, but stick to the Spanish theme for the most part. The area's oldest homes are in Southwest San Clemente, directly south of downtown and "North Beach" area, directly north of downtown. The homes in the Southwest Riviera neighborhood include several new constructions in the Cape Cod style, as well as new modern residences. More traditional, older homes sit in the Lasuen "boot" district; the neighborhood surrounding Lasuens or "Lost Winds" beach is characterized by a variety of styles in both single and double story fashion, with Hanson's traditional Spanish style sprinkled throughout, crafting an eclectic atmosphere. The renovations to historic buildings in North Beach have sparked a revival in the area, attracting new residents and business owners.

=== Largest employers ===
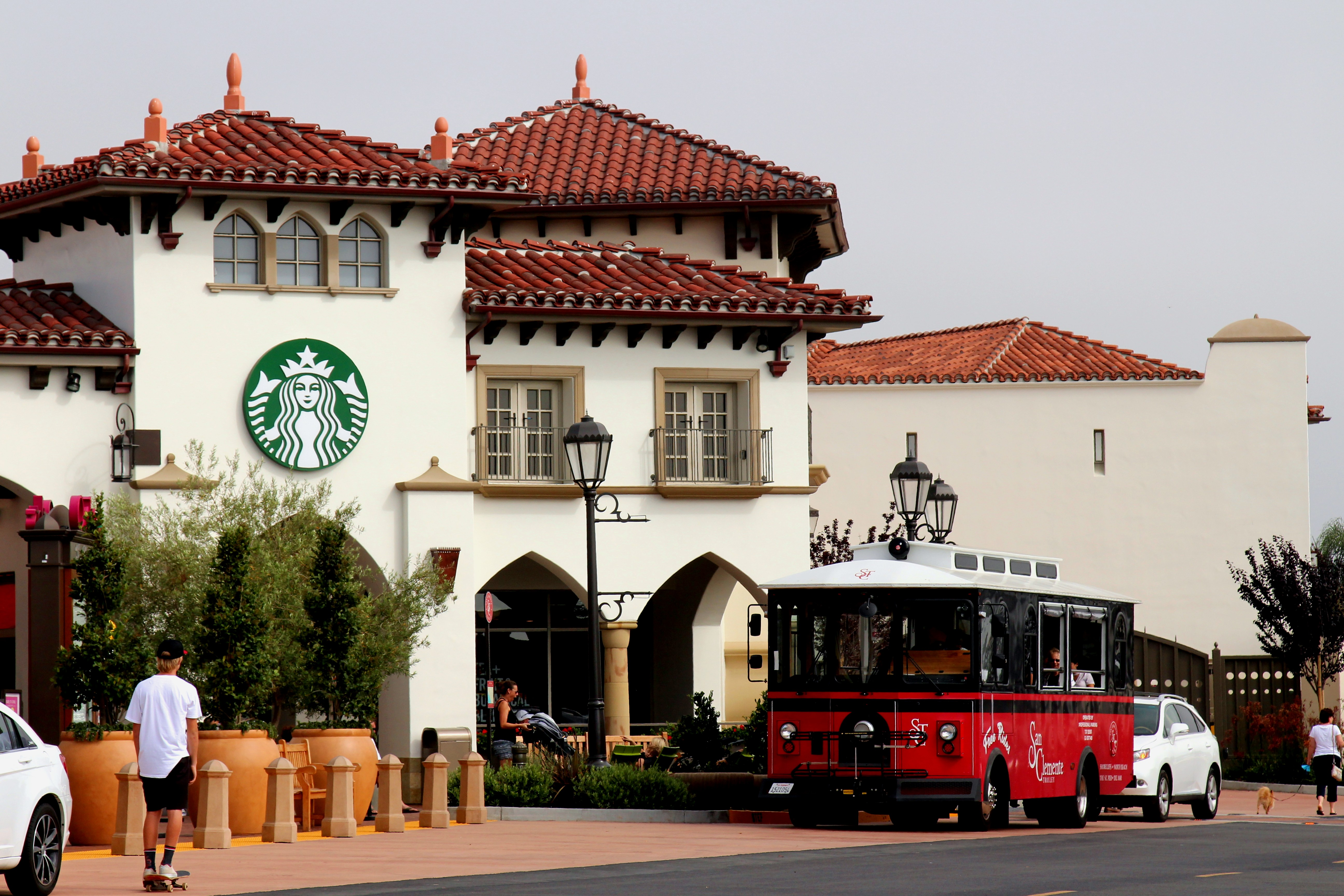
The Outlets at San Clemente.

Many people work as civilian employees at the USMC Base Camp Pendleton, which is just over the San Diego County line.

According to the city's 2022 Comprehensive Annual Financial Report, the largest employers in the city are:

#	Employer	# of employees
1	Capistrano Unified School District	635
2	Ralphs	239
3	Target	226
4	ICU Medical	224
5	Albertsons	209
6	Walmart	195
7	City of San Clemente	192
8	Glaukos Corp.	181
9	Fisherman's Restaurants	172
10	Lowe's	160

== Sports ==
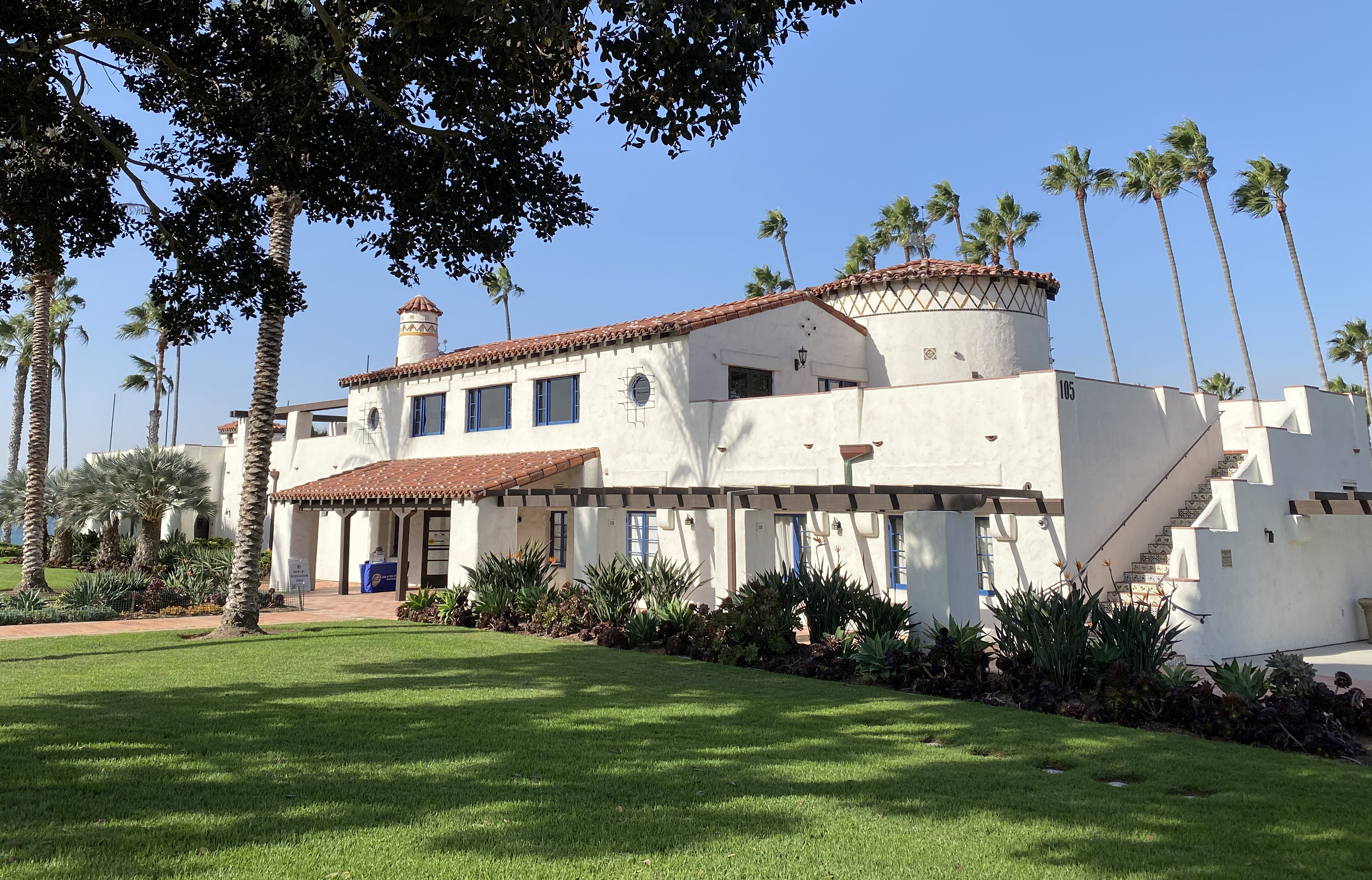
San Clemente Beach Club, b. 1928

San Clemente is known for its many surfing locations, which include Trestles, Lowers, Middles & Uppers, Cotton's Point, Calafia Beach Park, Riviera, Lasuens (most often called Lost Winds), The Hole, T-Street, The Pier, Linda Lane, 204, North Beach and Poche Beach. It is also home to Surfing Magazine, The Surfer's Journal, and Longboard Magazine.

The city has a large concentration of surfboard shapers and manufacturers. Additionally, numerous world-renowned surfers were raised in San Clemente or took up long-term residence in town, including Kolohe Andino, Shane Beschen, Mike Parsons (originally from Laguna Beach).

San Clemente High School has won 6 out of 7 most recent NSSA national surfing titles.

San Clemente will be the location of the surfing competition for the 2028 Summer Olympics in Los Angeles. Trestles will host the competition.

== Education ==
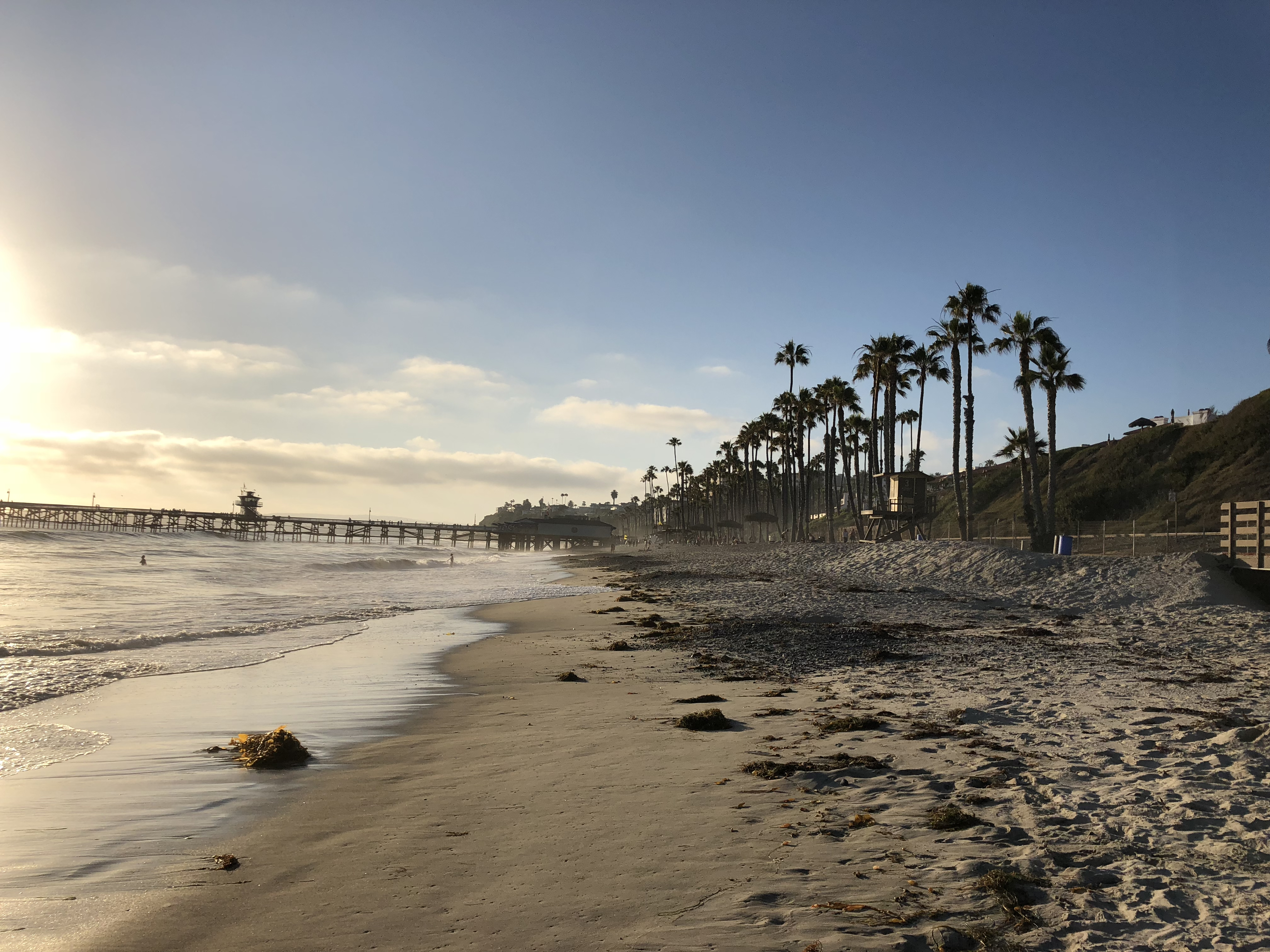
San Clemente State Beach.

The city is served by Capistrano Unified School District.

Within the city, there are five elementary schools, three middle schools, and one high school. There is also one virtual public K-12 school: Capistrano Connections Academy with flexible hours for students. The elementary schools are: Truman Benedict, Concordia Elementary, Vista Del Mar, Las Palmas, and Clarence H. Lobo Elementary. The middle schools are Bernice Ayer, Shorecliffs, and Vista Del Mar.

Las Palmas Elementary is well known for its dual immersion program.

San Clemente High School has an IB (International Baccalaureate) Program and a large number of AP (advanced placement) courses. Students at San Clemente High School have received academic accolades and hosted groups ranging from national title winning dance teams to award-winning orchestras, bands, voice groups and one of the nation's most skilled athletic programs; these groups have also received opportunities to perform at various venues including Carnegie Hall (madrigals and orchestra), various venues in Hawaii (marching band), and many others. After the extension of Avenida La Pata opened in 2016, some students have attended the neighboring San Juan Hills High School.

The nearest public college is Saddleback College in Mission Viejo.

== Government and politics ==
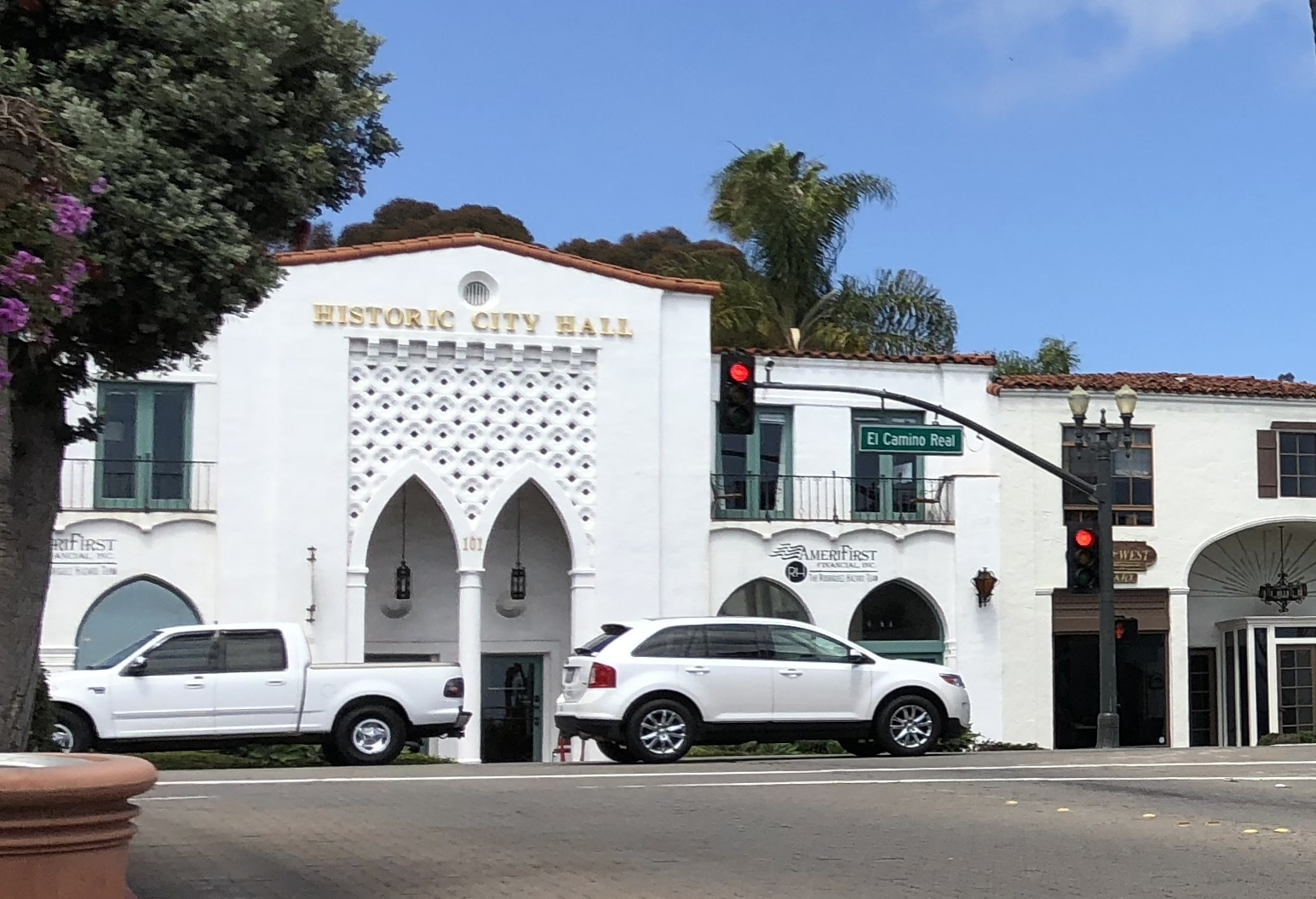
Historic City Hall, built in 1929.

In the California State Legislature, San Clemente is in the 36th senatorial district, represented by Republican Tony Strickland, and in the 74th Assembly district, represented by Republican Laurie Davies.

In the United States House of Representatives, San Clemente is in California's 49th congressional district, represented by Democrat Mike Levin.

Additionally, in the Orange County Board of Supervisors, San Clemente is in the fifth district represented by Katrina Foley since 2023.

According to the California Secretary of State, as of May 14, 2025, San Clemente has 45,890 registered voters. Of those, 17,791 (44.4%) are registered Republicans, 9,926 (24.8%) are registered Democrats, and 10,309 (25.7%) have declined to state a political party.

San Clemente is a stalwart Republican stronghold in presidential elections with no Democratic nominee winning the city in over four decades. San Clemente voted in favor of Proposition 8 by 55.5% and for Proposition 4 by 52.2%.

Gene James, elected by to the City Council in 2019, was appointed Mayor in 2021. James introduced a resolution to declare San Clemente a Second Amendment Freedom City in June 2021. In 2022, following the U.S. Supreme Court's decision in Dobbs v. Jackson Women's Health Organization, councilmember Steve Knoblock introduced a resolution to declare San Clemente a "sanctuary for life," which would have outlawed abortion within city limits. Following public pushback, the City Council voted 4–1 to table the measure, with only Knoblock voting to bring the resolution to a vote.

=== Crime ===
The Uniform Crime Report (UCR), collected annually by the FBI, compiles police statistics from local and state law enforcement agencies across the nation. The UCR records Part I and Part II crimes. Part I crimes become known to law enforcement and are considered the most serious crimes including homicide, rape, robbery, aggravated assault, burglary, larceny, motor vehicle theft, and arson. Part II crimes only include arrest data. The 2023 UCR Data is listed below:

2023 UCR Data
	Aggravated Assault	Homicide	Rape	Robbery	Burglary	Larceny Theft	Motor Vehicle Theft	Arson
San Clemente	71	0	3	18	103	643	147	3

== Media ==
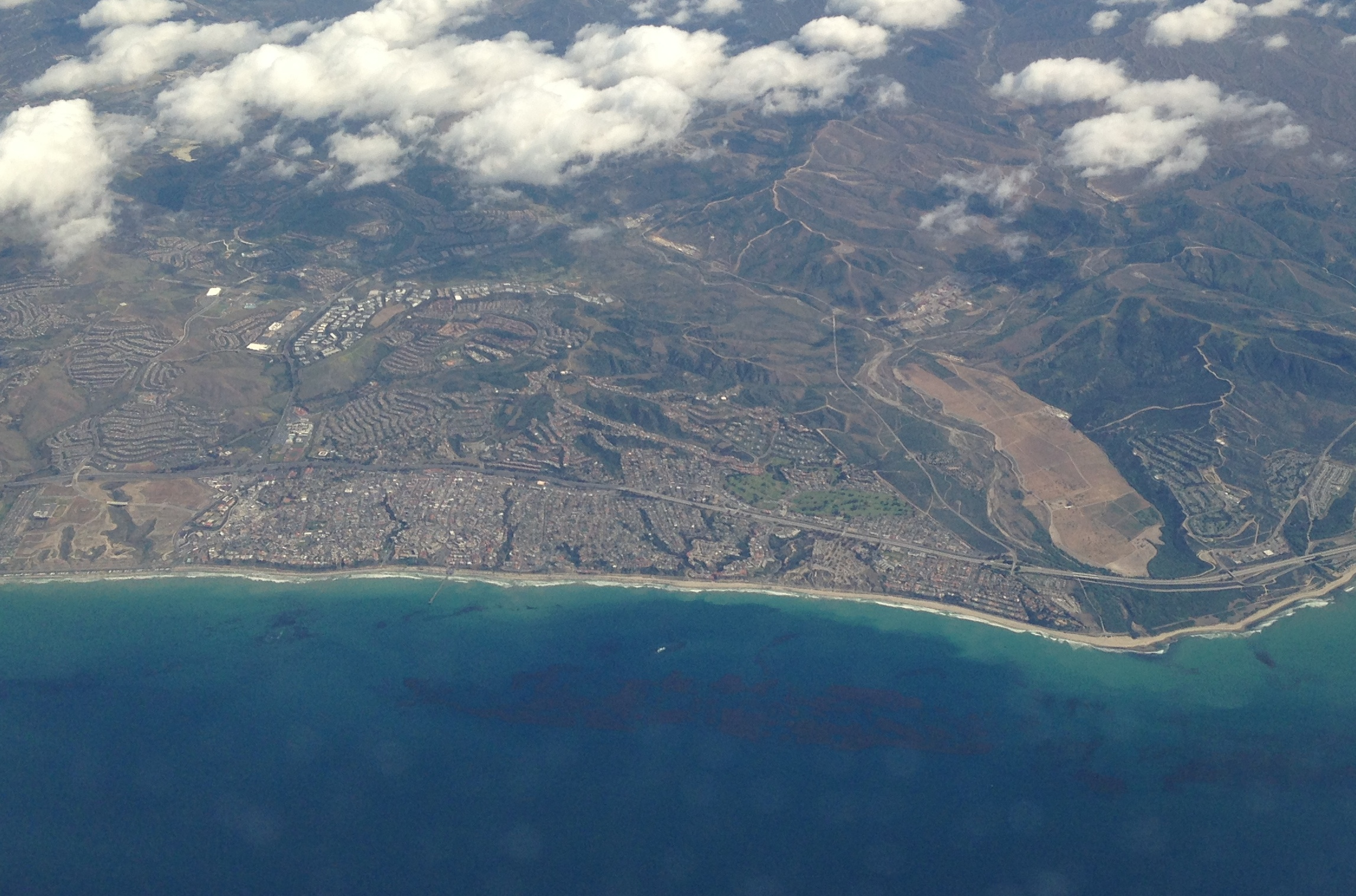
Aerial view of San Clemente.

San Clemente was the setting of the MTV reality show Life of Ryan.

It was also the setting of the 2005 film Brick. The town was chosen because it was particularly close to the director Rian Johnson who lived there and went to San Clemente High School, which was the school depicted in the film. Many of the locations in the film are still identical to the real ones, with the exception of the Pin's house, which was flattened a week after exterior shooting; the interior was constructed in a local warehouse. The football field has also since been replaced with artificial turf and track. The phone booths used all through the film are mostly props that were placed on location. The movie One of Her Own is based on incidents in and around San Clemente.

San Clemente is served by The San Clemente Times, which prints once weekly on Thursdays.

== Water Services ==
Water in San Clemente is supplied by the City of San Clemente Utilities Division, which sources its water from local groundwater and the Metropolitan Water District of Southern California. This water is imported by the State Water Project, which draws water from the Sacramento-San Joaquin Delta and the Colorado River. Additional water is supplied from the Irvine Ranch Water District’s Baker Water Treatment Plant.

== Transportation ==
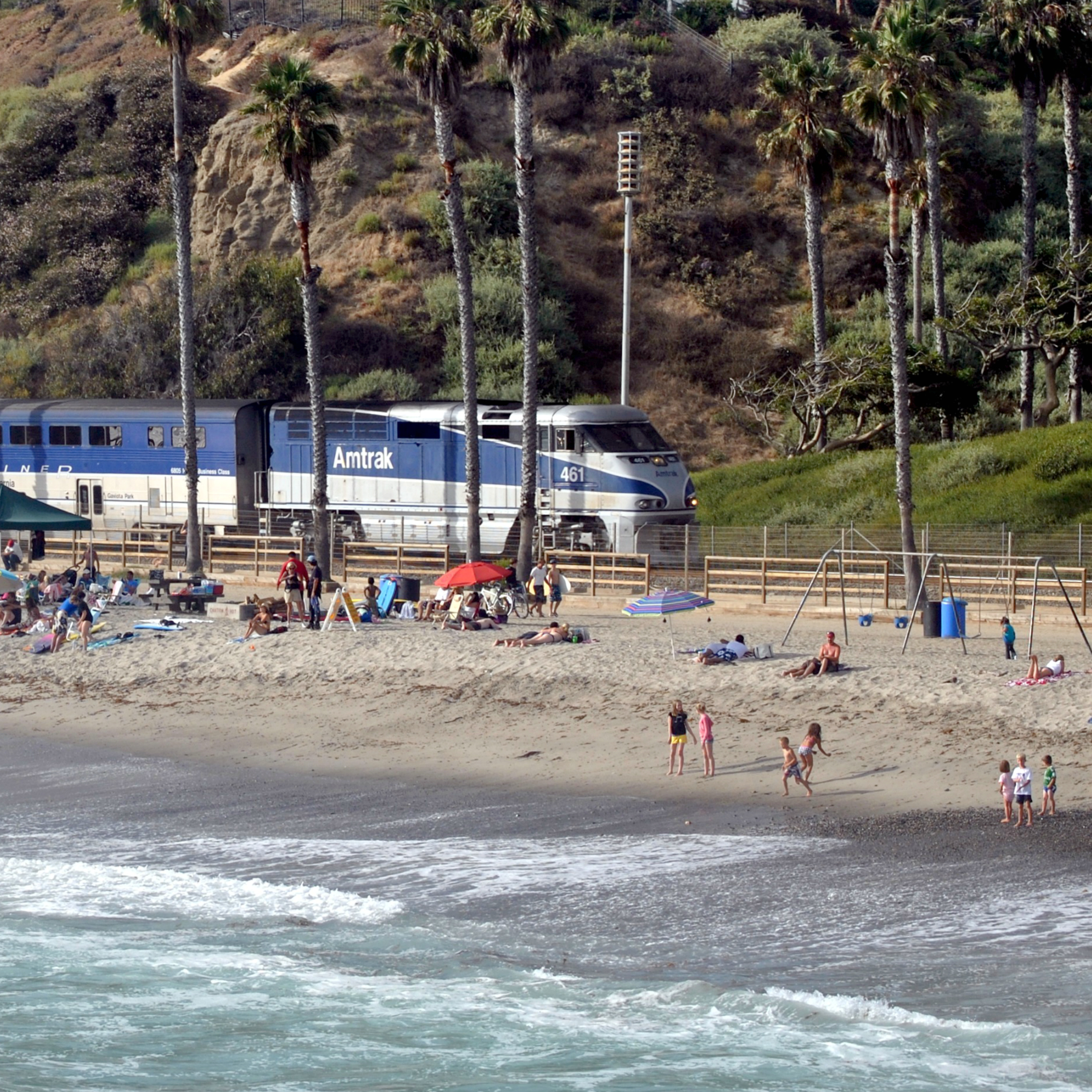
Amtrak California's Pacific Surfliner passing through San Clemente

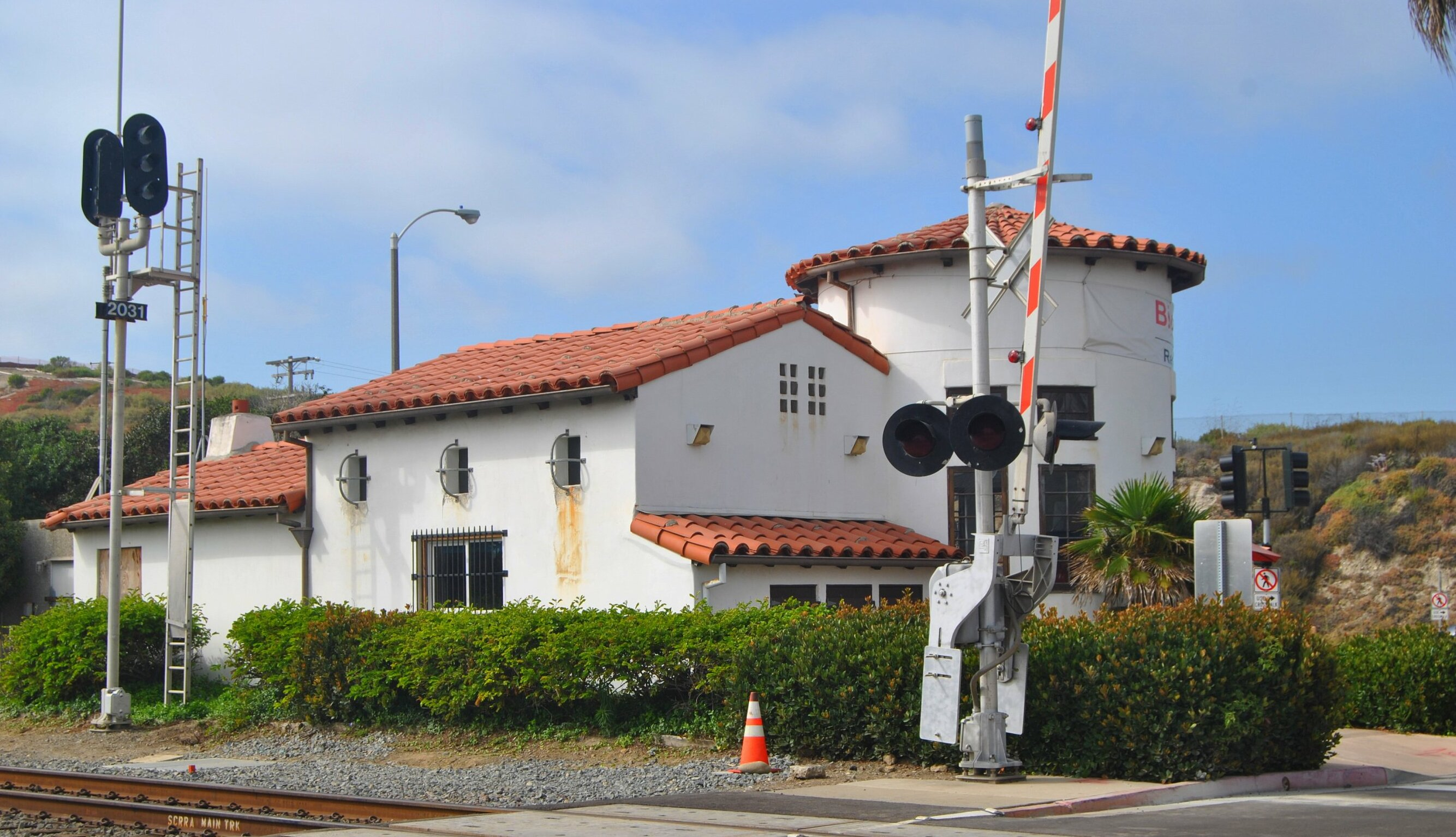
San Clemente station

Highways include Interstate 5.

Orange County Transportation Authority operates bus service in San Clemente. In 2016, San Clemente began offering residents free trolley service.

Amtrak's Pacific Surfliner and Metrolink's Orange County Line and Inland Empire–Orange County Line provide rail service. The city has two stations: San Clemente station and San Clemente Pier station.

== Notable people ==
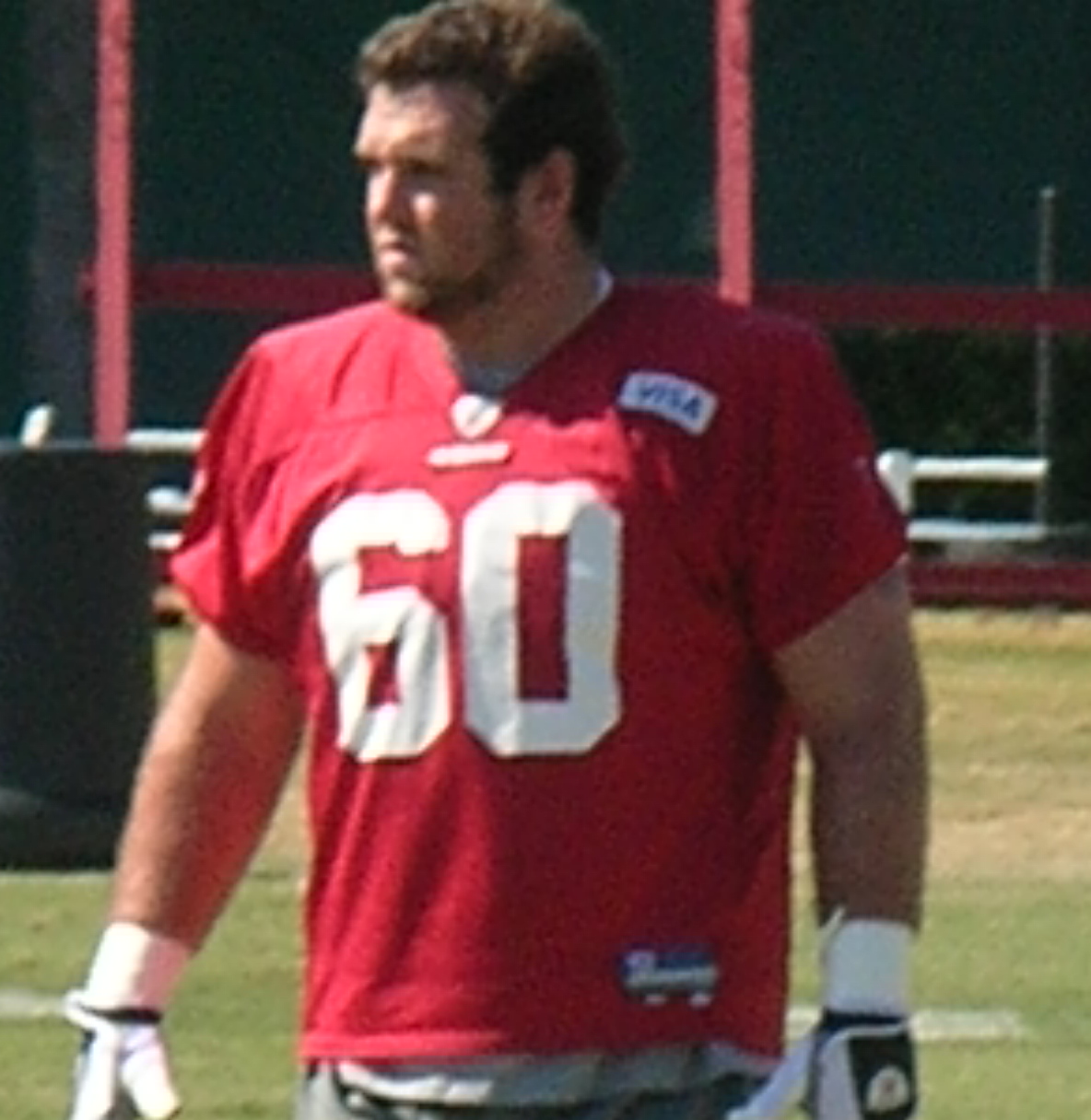
Brian de la Puente

- Kolby Allard, professional baseball player
- Kolohe Andino, professional surfer
- Anastasia Ashley, professional surfer
- Tyler Bagley, soccer player
- Aaron Bank, US Colonel, Special Forces
- Gibson Bardsley, soccer player
- Shane Beschen, professional surfer
- John "hex" Carter, Nerdapalooza creator
- Lon Chaney Jr., actor
- Anthony Cumia, radio host
- Sam Darnold, NFL football player
- Brian de la Puente, NFL football player
- Connor De Phillippi, race car driver
- Chloe East, American actress
- Jennie Eisenhower, granddaughter of President Richard Nixon, great-granddaughter of President Dwight D. Eisenhower
- Sue Enquist, Hall of Fame UCLA softball coach
- Jim Everett, NFL football quarterback
- Fu Manchu, rock band
- Jorge Garcia, actor
- Ole Hanson, former mayor of Seattle and founder of San Clemente
- Annie Hardy, musician with Giant Drag
- Jackson Hinkle, Marxist-Leninist political commentator
- Billy Johnson, racing driver
- Rian Johnson, director
- Carl Karcher, founder of Carl's Jr. and CKE Enterprises
- Jeff Kargola, professional Freestyle Motocross rider
- Todd Keneley, professional wrestling commentator
- Karch Kiraly, Olympic gold medalist in volleyball
- Gracie Kramer, artistic gymnast, part of the UCLA Bruins women's gymnastics team
- Kian Lawley, YouTuber, American actor
- Bob Lutz, tennis champion
- John Lyon, known as Southside Johnny, lead singer of Southside Johnny and the Asbury Jukes
- Colin McPhillips, professional longboarder
- Caroline Marks, 2024 Olympic gold medalist in surfing
- Kyle Murphy, professional football player (offensive tackle, Green Bay Packers)
- Richard Nixon, 37th President of the United States and Pat Nixon, first lady
- Ryann O'Toole, LPGA golfer
- Dominic Purcell, actor
- Aaron Rowand, MLB player
- Beckah Shae, Christian singer-songwriter
- Ryan Sheckler, professional skateboarder
- Adrian Smith, architect and designer of the Burj Khalifa, the tallest building in the world
- Gloria Swanson, three-time Academy Award Best Actress nominee
- Peter "PT" Townend, surfer
- Tristan Trager, soccer player
- Hal Trumble, American ice hockey administrator and referee
- Jean Vander Pyl, actress, voice of Wilma Flintstone
- Paul Walker, American actor
- Gene "Pop" Warner, influential football coach
- Paul Wiancko, classical cellist

== See also ==
- List of beaches in California
