= Workfront =

American software company

Workfront, Inc.
- Type: Private
- Industry: SaaS
- Genre: Project management software, Collaborative software
- Founded: 2001; 25 years ago
- Founder: Scott Johnson
- Headquarters: Lehi, Utah, US
- Area served: Worldwide
- Key people: Alex Shootman CEO, President
- Products: Enterprise Work management software
- Revenue: ▲$230 million (2019)
- Number of employees: 671 (2016)
- Website: workfront.com

Workfront, Inc., was a Lehi, Utah-based software company that developed web-based work management and project management software that features enterprise work management, issue tracking, document management, time tracking and portfolio management. The company was founded in 2001 by Scott Johnson. Workfront has 1000 employees and approximately 4,000 customers with offices in the United States and EMEA.

In 2015, the company was renamed from AtTask to Workfront and opened a new headquarters in Utah. Workfront’s customers include companies such as Cars.com, Cisco Systems, Comcast, Food and Drug Administration and National Geographic. The company’s software has been implemented by Emerson and the State of Arkansas court system to standardize project management process including collaboration and document control.

On November 9, 2020, Adobe Inc announced it would acquire Workfront for US$1.5 billion. The acquisition closed on December 7, 2020.

== History ==
In 2001, entrepreneur Scott Johnson had an idea for a software package that would allow companies to better manage workflow and communication. After building a workable version of his software, he founded AtTask, along with Abe Knell, Jason Fletcher and Nate Bowler. In July 2001, AtTask released @task, a project management tool designed for businesses. The nascent company was boot-strapped and funded in part by second mortgages Johnson, Fletcher and Bowler took out on their homes.

Johnson decided to completely rewrite the company's project management platform in 2003. The rewritten version of @task was finished and released in 2006. Joseph Cardenas joined AtTask’s board of directors in April 2007. Prior to joining AtTask, Cardenas served as a partner at Counterpoint Advisers and CIO of Salesforce.com.

In June 2007, AtTask received $7 million in funding from OpenView Venture Partners. The $7 million investment equaled more than twice AtTask's 2006 revenue. OpenView's investment was the first outside investment accepted by AtTask. OpenView invested an additional $6.5 million in December 2009.

In 2011, Eric Morgan replaced founder Scott Johnson as president and CEO of AtTask. Johnson became chairman of AtTask.

In November 2012, AtTask raised $17 million in venture capital in a funding round led by Greenspring Associates. The company raised an additional $38 million in a January 2014, funding round led by JMI Equity. The 2014 funding round was their fourth and included an additional investment by Greenspring Associations. The company announced a 50 percent year-over-year subscription growth rate.

In 2015, AtTask was renamed to Workfront. Workfront raised a $33 million Series E funding led by JMI Equity along with investments from Greenspring Global Partners and Atlas Peak in 2015. The company has raised a total of $95 million in venture capital to date. In that same year, Workfront acquired online proofing vendor and partner ProofHQ, a London-based provider of online proofing software. The acquisition integrated over 350 joint clients between the two companies, however, ProofHQ continues to be sold separately.

Workfront developed a Game of Thrones-themed infographic for mobile phone etiquette, which used humor to show statistics of the most common office communication pitfalls and office attitudes toward common witnessed behaviors. The concept was built upon the “seven houses” of the workplace: multitasking, awkwardness, carelessness, courtesy, over-calling, non-communication and obliviousness. In 2014, the company received a B2B Oscar for Best Call to Action for its humorous video, “The Working Dead.”

On July 5, 2016, Workfront announced that Alex Shootman would serve as CEO.

Later that month, on Aug. 18, 2020, Workfront introduced two new applications: Align, which gives companies the ability to set and communicate clear objectives, and keep teams and individuals aligned and focused on the right work to achieve the right outcomes, and Scenario Planner, which enables business leaders to create and compare multiple work management plans to ensure people and resources are deployed effectively to achieve results.

=== Stress in the workplace study ===
Workfront conducted a survey that showed top causes for workplace stress were excessive workloads and competing deadlines, a lack of communication and visibility into the work done by others on the team and poor access to resources to complete work. The survey showed that among the 526 marketing professionals, four out of five employees experienced burn out and 73 percent expected a rise in work stress levels. In addition to stress, 72 percent of the industry professionals reported office tension as a contributor to stress levels and that they were overloaded and understaffed. Those surveyed believed that employers could remedy their stress by providing structures and tools to create a support system, having more involvement in decision-making and more contact with management, and implementing training on how to productively structure the work day.

=== Workplace productivity study ===
In 2014, Workfront conducted a study on workplace productivity and found that American employees on average only spend 45 percent of their work time on what they were hired to do. The 2,000 survey participants, listed inefficient meetings and excessive emails as interruptions. Another 36 percent reported that a lack of process keeps them from completing their responsibilities and 35 percent mentioned excessive oversight. The study discovered that 81 percent of those surveyed experienced workplace conflict with other departments, groups, teams, or co-workers which resulted in loss of productivity.

=== UK office workers studies ===
In 2015, a study conducted by Workfront on UK office workers, found that those working as marketers were the hardest working, the study also found that these workers were more likely to suffer from digital-overload.

Another survey of 2,500 UK office workers examined the differences in skill-sets and attitudes between different generations of workers. The study found that Millennials complained the most, but were seen as the most tech savvy. The study also found that members of Generation X were viewed as the hardest workers, most helpful and best troubleshooters.

=== State of Work report ===
2015–2016

In 2016, Workfront conducted a State of Enterprise Work Report that found American marketers who work at large companies spent only 39 percent of their work time doing the job they were hired for. The 606 participants cited meetings, excessive oversight, emails and administrative tasks as key obstacles kept them from performing their primary role. The survey also found that 84 percent of respondents loved their jobs despite working a slightly longer than average workweek and taking shorter lunches than their non-marketing counterparts. Workfront also conducted a nearly identical study in the U.K. with very similar results.

2017–2018

The 2017-2018, State of Work Report found that knowledge workers continue to be thwarted by tools and practices that are intended to facilitate productivity and collaboration. Wasteful meetings and excessive emails topped the list of productivity killers, forcing workers to spend less than half of their time on the work they were actually hired to do. Results were similar among workers surveyed in the UK.

2018–2019

The 2018-2019, State of Work Report which surveyed over 2,000 knowledge workers in the U.S. and the UK found that workers are struggling to innovate even though it is regularly asked of them. Email and meetings are preventing workers from getting work done; only 40% of their workday is spent on primary tasks. Workers believe automation will help them spend more time on work that matters, although 48% of workers say they know people who have already lost jobs due to automation.

== Software ==
Workfront provides a software-as-a-service platform for enterprise workflow management, project and portfolio management, resource management and individual task management. Workfront's platform automates and repeatable processes and allows users to manage financial information and create reports. The platform is used for task management and has tools for document management, workflows, reports, dashboards and approvals.

The Workfront Enterprise Work Cloud is a project management tool used to increase productivity and visibility. The platform is used by global enterprises such as Disney, Tommy Hilfiger, ATB Financial, and Trek Bicycle. In 2016, Workfront added an extension that allows for integration with the Adobe Creative Cloud.

In 2015, Workfront launched a non-intrusive digital asset management (DAM) space allowing marketing teams to manage collaboration, brand management and asset control with efficiency. The digital asset management solution was added to the enterprise workflow platform to help marketers store, use and reuse digital assets for an efficient workflow and integration between DAM and the work management ecosystem.

== See also ==
- List of Adobe software
- Comparison of project management software
- List of collaborative software
