= Cameron Health =

American medical device developer

- Type: Privately held
- Industry: Medical technology
- Founded: 2000
- Founder: Gust Bardy, MD and Riccardo Cappato, MD
- Defunct: June 8, 2012
- Fate: Acquired
- Successor: Boston Scientific
- Headquarters: San Clemente, California, United States
- Key people: Kevin Hykes, President and CEO
- Products: Subcutaneous Implantable cardioverter-defibrillator
- Website: www.cameronhealth.com

Cameron Health was a medical device developer based in San Clemente, California, US. Cameron Health had its European office, Cameron Health BV, in Arnhem, The Netherlands. The privately held company's focus was on a new generation of minimally invasive implantable cardioverter-defibrillator (ICD) which they called a Subcutaneous Implantable Defibrillator (S-ICD). Cameron Health's approach avoided implanting transvenous leads into the heart, which had been the usual procedure for cardiac devices. Instead, the Cameron ICD was entirely implanted outside the thoracic wall.

In June 2012, Boston Scientific acquired Cameron Health for a total sum of $1.3 Billion, paid out incrementally as various revenue milestones were achieved. As of April 2026, Boston Scientific still markets the S-ICD system.

== Reasons for a minimally invasive approach ==
Every ICD is designed to detect heart rhythms consistent with a catastrophic failure of the body's natural regulation of the heartbeat, which, untreated, could result in death. When an ICD detects a serious arrhythmia, it issues an electrical impulse to the heart muscle, of a magnitude sufficient to cause the heart to revert to a normal rhythm. ICDs with transvenous leads administer this shock to the interior of the heart muscle; the Cameron Health device generated a more powerful shock which can be effective from outside the heart. In the view of Cameron Health, transvenous leads into the heart needlessly complicated the process of implanting a device, and raised other issues and risks which their less invasive approach avoids.

The Cameron Health subcutaneous ICD sat outside the ribcage and has no connection to the interior of the heart. The surgical procedure for implantation was minimally invasive as opposed to the traditional procedure of threading leads into the subclavian venous system, through the superior vena cava and into one or more endocardial areas of the heart, a procedure often requiring a cardiologist with specialized training in electrophysiology. In addition to the risks inherent in cardiac surgery, the leads have themselves proved to be a weakness in some ICD designs. According to one estimate, patients with ICDs have a 20 percent chance of lead failure within 10 years, and replacing the leads carries a risk of death of between two and five percent. Some device manufacturers have had to replace defective leads which exposed implanted individuals to unnecessary shocks or other malfunctions, in some cases possibly resulting in fatalities.

The Cameron Health S-ICD had the disadvantage of being somewhat bulkier than existing ICDs. Also, this kind of ICD did not include a pacemaker, which narrowed the range of patients for whom it would be appropriate; it was estimated that a majority of patients receiving combination pacemaker/ICD implants would qualify for a pure ICD. These patients tended to have genetic or other conditions predisposing them to sudden cardiac death due to a failure of the heart of maintain a normal rhythm.

== Clinical trials and approvals ==
A trial involving 53 patients, who were temporarily implanted with S-ICDs, was reported in 2005 at the European Society of Cardiology Congress. A second series of 55 trial patients was conducted in 2008 and 2009 in 10 centers in Europe and New Zealand. Of the 55 patients, 53 had two instances of fibrillation and in 52 these were successfully converted. These findings were reported to European Union authorities in 2009, and resulted in approval for marketing the device. A study of 300 patients is in progress for US approvals. Small nonrandomized early-phase studies primarily intended to show the feasibility of an entirely subcutaneous ICD were updated, combined and published in May 2010. In this report, the system successfully and consistently detected and converted episodes of ventricular fibrillation that were induced during electrophysiological testing. In the European trial of 55 patients, after 46 patient-years of follow-up, 54 of 55 patients were alive, and the single death was due to renal failure. In this trial the system successfully detected and treated 12 episodes (100%)of spontaneous, sustained ventricular tachyarrhythmia in three patients, prior to the onset of syncope, and with no adverse events. One of the three patients was successfully treated for seven successive episodes of ventricular tachycardia, a condition known as a "VT storm".

== Financing ==
Boston Scientific acquired an exclusive option to purchase Cameron Health in 2004, and made an undisclosed equity investment in the company at that time. In 2008, Piper Jaffray, and investment company, organized several additional investors, including PTV Healthcare Capital, Delphi Ventures, Sorrento Ventures, Three Arch Partners and Versant Ventures, who provided just over $50 million to finance the continuing operation of the company.

In June 2012, Boston Scientific officially acquired Cameron Health for a total sum of $1.3 Billion, paid out incrementally as various revenue milestones were achieved.
