= National Museum of African Art =

Museum in Washington, D.C.

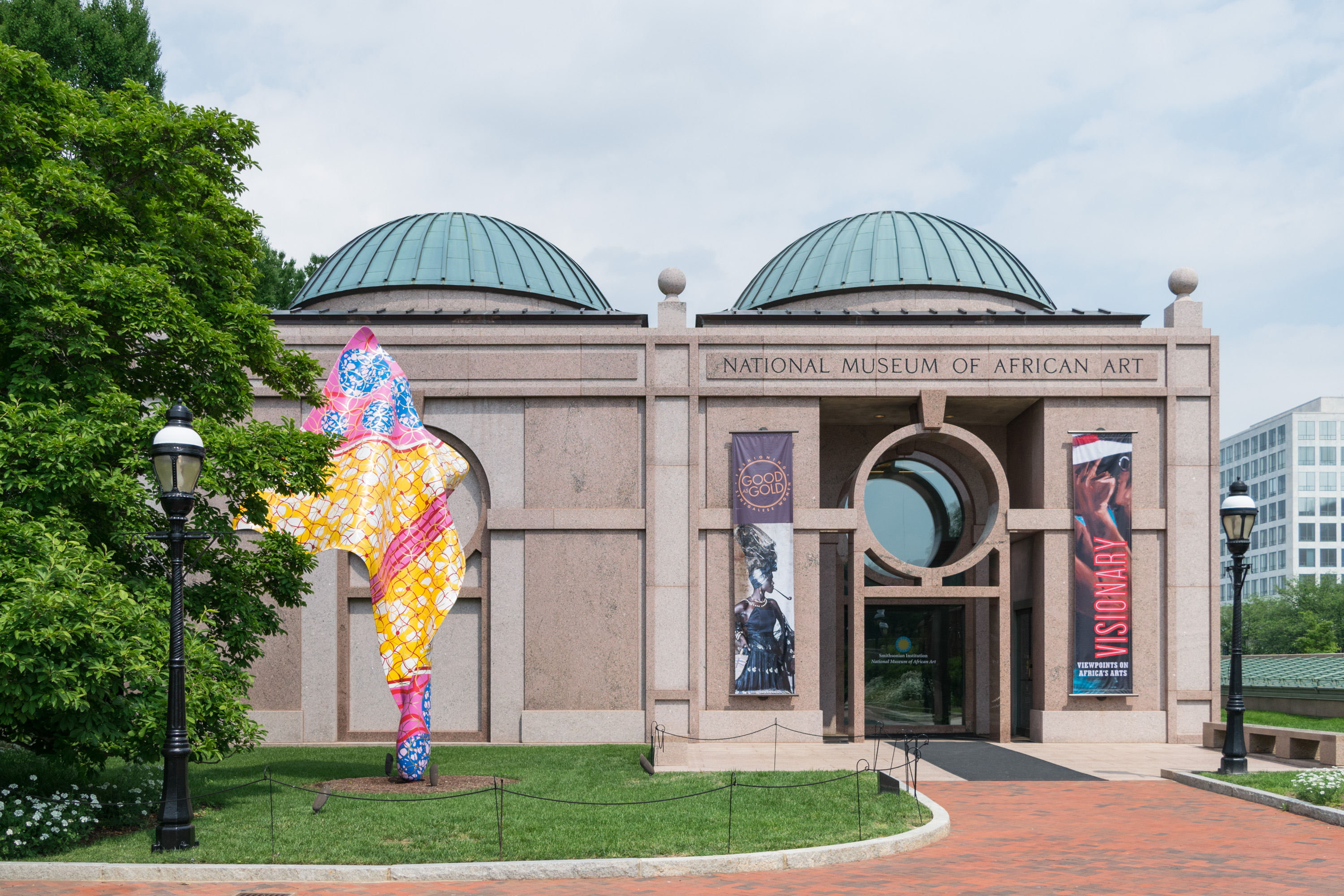

- Location in Washington, D.C.
- Former name: Museum of African Art
- Established: 1964
- Location: Washington, D.C., United States
- Coordinates: 38.8880°N 77.0255°W
- Collections: African art
- Collection size: 11,800
- Visitors: 213,000 (2016)
- Founder: Warren M. Robbins
- Public transit access: at Smithsonian
- Website: africa.si.edu

The National Museum of African Art is the Smithsonian Institution's African art museum, located on the National Mall of the United States capital. Its collections include 9,000 works of traditional and contemporary African art from both Sub-Saharan and North Africa, 300,000 photographs, and 50,000 library volumes. It was the first institution dedicated to African art in the United States and remains the largest collection. The Washington Post called the museum a mainstay in the international art world and the main venue for contemporary African art in the United States.

The museum was founded in 1964 by a former Foreign Service officer in Capitol Hill. The collection focused on traditional African art and an educational mission to teach black cultural heritage. To ensure the museum's longevity, the founder lobbied Congress to adopt the museum under the Smithsonian's auspices. It joined the Smithsonian in 1979 and became the National Museum of African Art two years later. A new, primarily underground museum building was completed in 1987, just off the National Mall and adjacent to other Smithsonian museums. It is among the Smithsonian's smallest museums.

The African art museum took a scholarly direction over the next twenty years, with less social programming. It collected traditional and contemporary works of historical importance. Exhibitions include both internal and borrowed works and have ranged from solo artists to broad survey shows. The museum hosts two-to-three temporary exhibitions and ten special events annually. The preferred abbreviation for its name is NMAfA.

== History ==
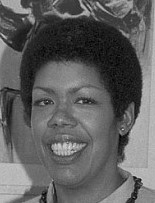
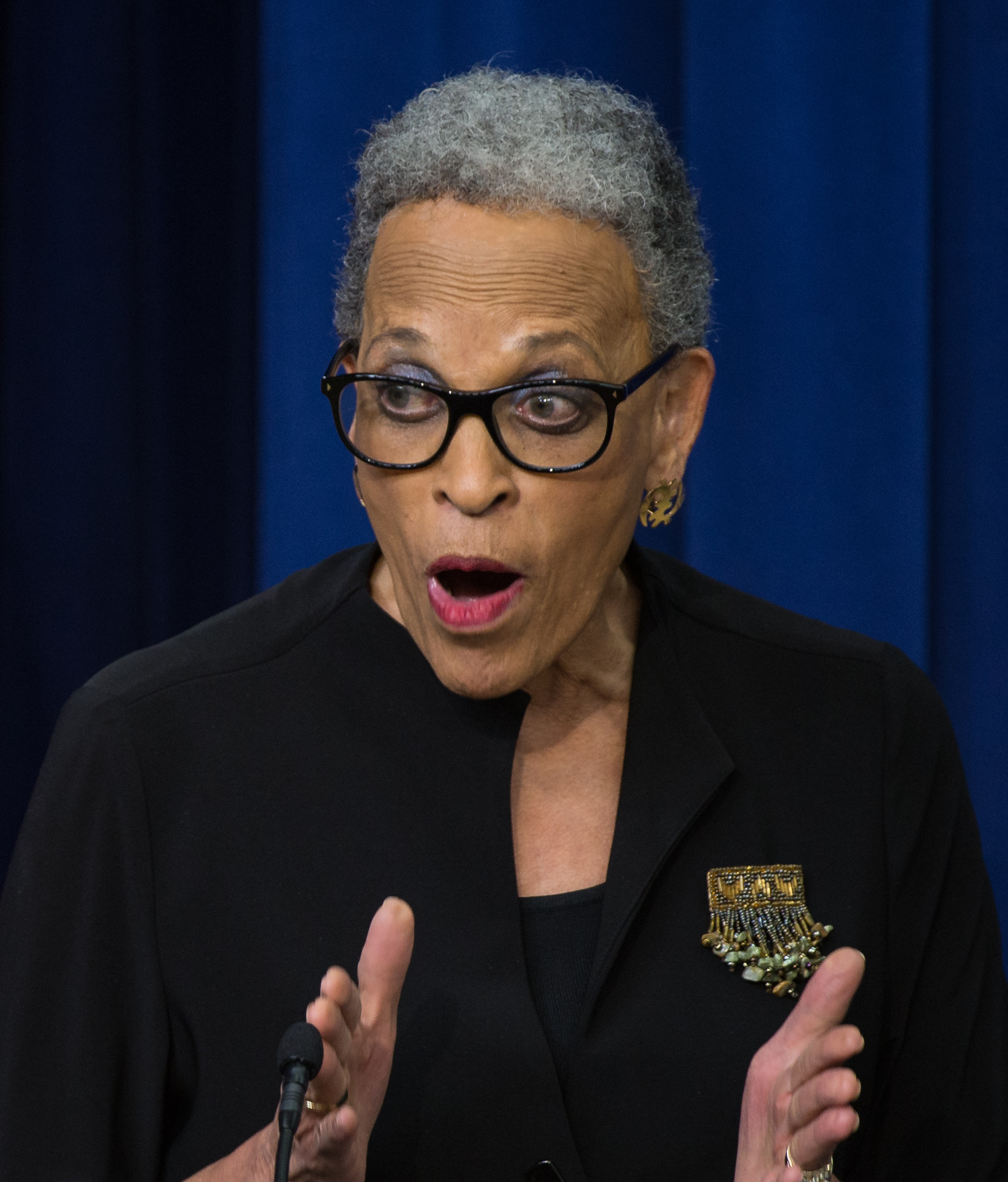
Museum directors Warren M. Robbins (1964–1982), Sylvia Williams (1983–1996), and Johnnetta Cole (2009–2017)

In the late 1950s, American Foreign Service officer Warren M. Robbins purchased 32 pieces of African art in antique shops near Hamburg, Germany. In 1963, he founded the Center for Cross Cultural Communication, a non-profit educational institute and cultural center. In 1964, the Frederick Douglass House on Capitol Hill came on the market. Robbins put all of his savings down in cash for half of the purchase price and procured a mortgage for the rest. Money raised by the Center for Cross Cultural Communication enabled Robbins to found the Museum of African Art.

The museum was formally founded in 1964 as the Museum of African Art, and its first show consisted of the collection and two outside pieces. Under Robbins's tenure, the museum focused on traditional African art and its educational mission to teach black cultural heritage. It also served as a convivial meeting place for individuals interested in American racial politics, in keeping with the 1960s and 1970s Black Arts Movement effort to change American perceptions towards African cultures. Robbins referred to his museum as "an education department with a museum attached". By 1976, the African art museum had a 20-person staff, 6,000-object collection, and Robbins had visited Africa for the first time.

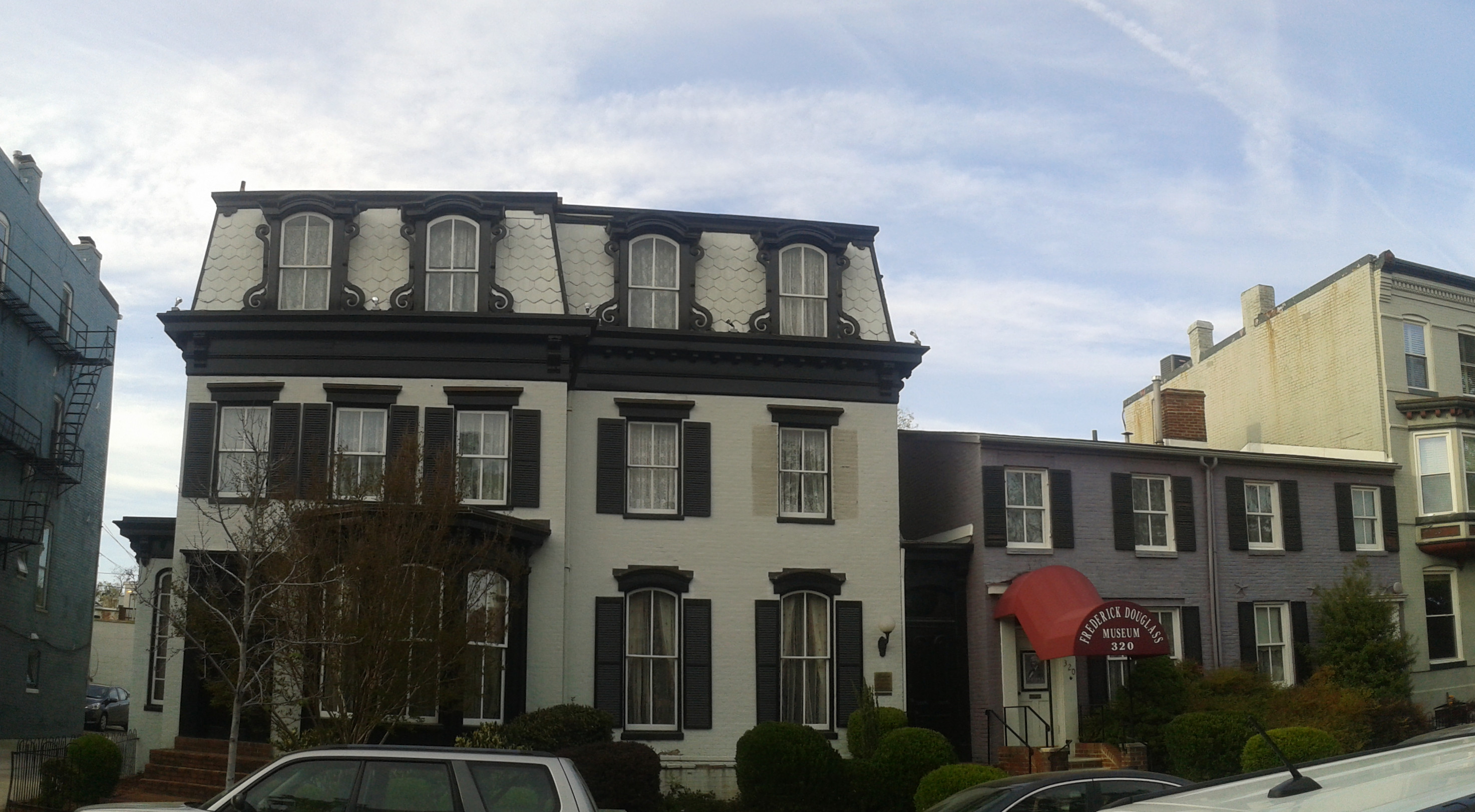
The museum's original location on Capitol Hill

To ensure the museum's longevity, Robbins lobbied the national legislature (Congress) to absorb his museum into the Smithsonian Institution, a federal group of museums and research centers. The House of Representatives approved this plan in 1978 with backing from Representatives John Brademas, Lindy Boggs, Ron Dellums, the Congressional Black Caucus, and former Vice President Hubert Humphrey. The Smithsonian directors adopted the museum the following year and began plans to move the collection from the townhouses into a proper museum. In 1981, the museum was renamed the National Museum of African Art.

In early 1983, Sylvia Williams became the museum's director. Later that year, the Smithsonian broke ground on a new, dedicated building for the African art museum on the National Mall. The complex was situated mostly underground and expanded the museum's exhibition space upon its September 1987 opening. Over time, perspectives towards African art shifted from ethnographic interest to the study of traditional objects for their craftsmanship and aesthetic properties. Williams took a scholarly, art historian approach to the museum and pursued risky, high-cost pieces before their ultimate values were settled. The collection expanded into contemporary works and works from Arab North Africa, beyond the traditional Sub-Saharan. The museum's founder criticized this direction and felt that the institution was neglecting its public role for "esoteric scholarship".

Following Williams's death in 1996, curator Roslyn Walker served as director from 1997 through her 2002 retirement. Walker continued the direction of her predecessor and added a dedicated contemporary art gallery and curator. She also created a development office, which raised money for an early 2000s renovation of the museum's pavilion. Sharon Patton, former director of Oberlin College's Allen Memorial Art Museum, served as director between 2003 and 2008. Her tenure included more shows targeting children and an advisory board mass resignation over Smithsonian leadership.

Johnnetta Cole, an anthropologist and former president of Spelman and Bennett College, became the museum's director in 2009. Her tenure became associated with a controversial 2015 exhibit that featured works from comedian Bill Cosby's private collection just as allegations of sexual assault against him became public. Cole retired in March 2017 and was succeeded by British filmmaker, scholar, and curator Gus Casely-Hayford in February 2018.

In 2022, the museum returned 29 looted Benin Bronzes to Nigeria.

In 2021 museum consultant Ngaire Blankenberg became director, she left in 2023. The museum was scheduled for remodeling as part of the Smithsonian's South Mall project starting in 2014, but plans were subsequently scaled back.

=== Administration ===
As of the late 2000s, The Washington Post wrote that the museum struggled with low attendance, modest budget, concealed location, and leadership turnovers. Thirty years after joining the Smithsonian, the museum remains one of the smallest museums in the complex, with 213,000 visitors in 2016—about half of the 2009 count and less than one percent of the 28 million annual Smithsonian visitors. This is due, in part, to its location, which is hidden from the National Mall by the original Smithsonian Institution Building, known as the Castle. Visitor numbers have fluctuated between 200,000 and 400,000 since the 2000s, and in the mid-2000s were comparable with its underground neighbor museum, the Sackler Gallery. The museum's annual budget has fluctuated from $4.3 million (late 1990s) to $6 million (mid-2000s), and was $5 million in 2016. By comparison, the museum had a 34-person staff in 2016, down from 48 in the late 1990s. Following Blankenberg's tenure, staff numbers dropped below 20. Like many other museums in the 2000s, the museum has sought private funding and endowments. It trailed behind other Smithsonian entities in fundraising campaigns, into which the museum was expected to pay about $2.1 million. In late 2016, the museum held its first annual African Arts Awards Dinner for more than 500 guests.

== Architecture ==
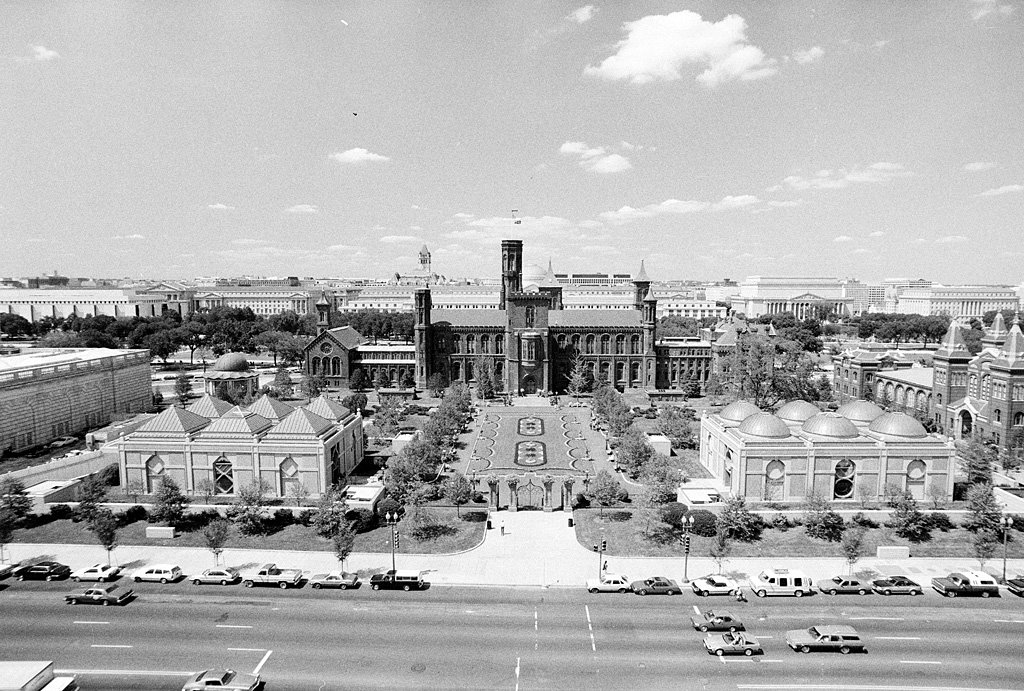
View of the four-acre quadrangle, with the Sackler Gallery (near left), Enid A. Haupt Garden and Smithsonian Institution Building (center), and African art museum (near right)

The museum's National Mall building construction began in mid-1983. The project, which also included the Sackler Gallery for the Smithsonian's Asian art, created 368,000 square feet of exhibition space at the cost of $73.2 million, half of which from the federal government. Almost all of this room was created underground so as not to affect the quadrangle's landmark Smithsonian Institution Building (the Castle), its greenery, or its view. The Smithsonian Castle hides the museum and South Quadrangle from the National Mall, which has contributed to the museum's lower attendance compared with other Mall attractions. The quadrangle project's design architect was Jean-Paul Carlhian of Shepley, Bulfinch, Richardson & Abbott, based on a concept by Junzō Yoshimura. The two new museums had little involvement in the architectural designs drawn in the 1970s before their arrival.

The African art and Sackler buildings were built as twin pavilions, each one story above ground and with similar display space: five galleries each, and only one with natural light. They are differentiated by their roof adornments: domes on the African art building and pyramids on the Sackler. The African art pavilion was built in red granite and used the circle shape as its architectural theme, with round windows, a rounded entrance staircase, and six round domes on its roof. Inside, a limestone foyer overlooks the gardens. A curving stair hall leads visitors down curving stairs to the galleries. The galleries are large and customized by exhibition designers into smaller rooms to better suit small objects. The buildings are visible from Independence Avenue, and the new Enid A. Haupt Garden runs between them and the Smithsonian Institution Building. Underground, the museum and offices occupy the first two levels. A third level hosts exhibition and educational rooms. Its levels are connected by a three-story enclosed arcade with large skylights set into the gardens above, through several feet of dirt. The pavilion was renovated in the early 2000s with a significant donation from Eastman Kodak.

The museum was scheduled for remodeling as part of the $2 billion Smithsonian South Mall project. Plans from the Danish architects, Bjarke Ingels Group, would have replaced the above-ground pavilion with new mall-facing entrances. The renovation was intended to be supported by private and federal investment and was expected to begin in 2016 and finish in 10 to 20 years. These plans were canceled in 2021 after a broader restructuring of the South Mall renovation project.

Yinka Shonibare's Wind Sculpture VII was put on permanent display outside the museum in late 2016.

== Collections ==
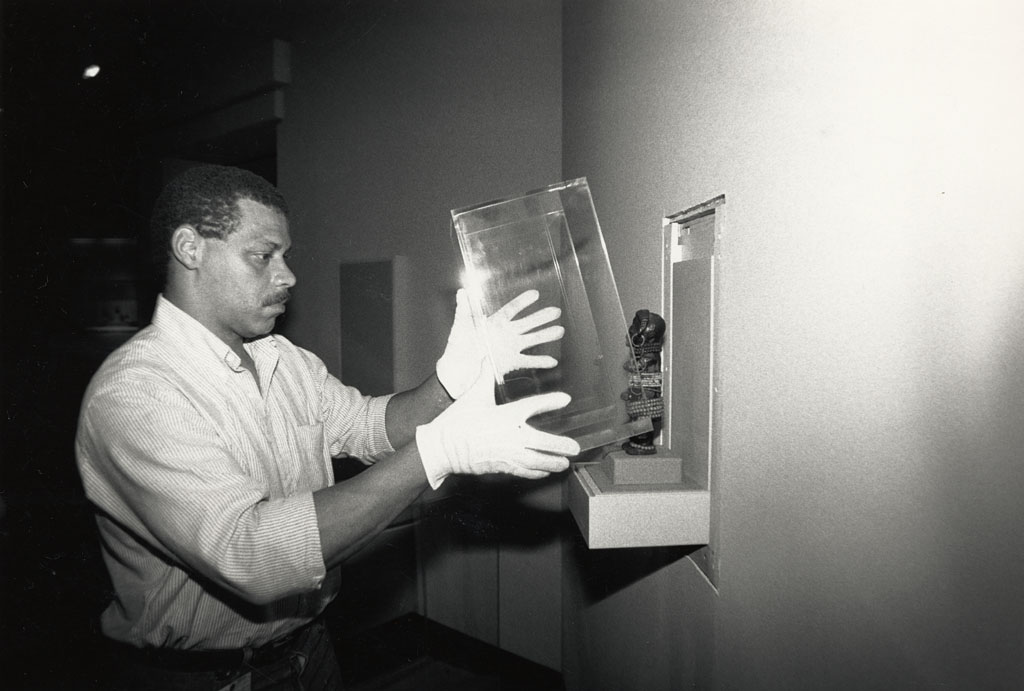
A specialist prepares an exhibit in 1987.

The National Museum of African Art was the first institution dedicated to African art in the United States, followed by the New York-based Center for African Art (now The African Center) in 1984. The National Museum's collection is more extensive. As of 2008, it consisted of 9,000 objects and 300,000 photographs. The objects range from 15th-century sculptures and masks to multimedia contemporary art, and the photographs include significant contributions from photojournalists Eliot Elisofon and Constance Stuart Larrabee. Elisofon covered major 20th-century events for Life, and Larrabee covered World War II and South African life. As of 2004, the museum had 400 contemporary artworks. The museum collects items for both their traditional uses and aesthetic values, and receives an average of 67 gifts annually. The breadth of its collections and special exhibitions made the museum "a solid force in the international art world" and the main venue for contemporary African art in the United States, according to The Washington Post.

As the museum moved to the National Mall in the mid-1980s, its permanent collection consisted of more than 6,000 art objects (e.g., sculpture, artifacts, textiles) and the large Elisofon photography collection. This original collection focused on Sub-Saharan Africa, with better representation of the Guinea coast and Western Sudan than the Central African region. The collection is idiosyncratic, reflecting the relative lack of colonial era African art acquisitions in American donor collections. Some early highlights of the museum's collection include an Edo–Portuguese ivory spoon and an Akan gold pendant bequeathed by the Robert Woods Bliss estate. The museum's first acquisitions budget came with joining the Smithsonian.

Within a decade, the collection had expanded to 7,000 traditional and modern objects from across all of Africa. Under Walker's tenure, the museum expanded its contemporary art collection, opening a permanent gallery in 1997. That year, photographer Constance Stuart Larrabee gave the museum 3,000 photographs from South Africa. In 2005, the museum received the Walt Disney-Tishman Collection of 525 works spanning most major African art styles and 75 cultures. The acquisition was a validation of the museum's status, given the other institutions who vied for the collection. The museum's library also grew upon joining the Smithsonian, from 3,000 to 30,000 volumes in visual arts, anthropology, cooking, history, religion, and travel, especially works published in Africa. It now contains 50,000 volumes.

In March 2022, the museum announced plans to return to Nigeria 39 Benin Bronzes that were seized during the Benin Expedition of 1897. These pieces will go on display at the National Museum of Benin in Benin City.

== Exhibitions ==
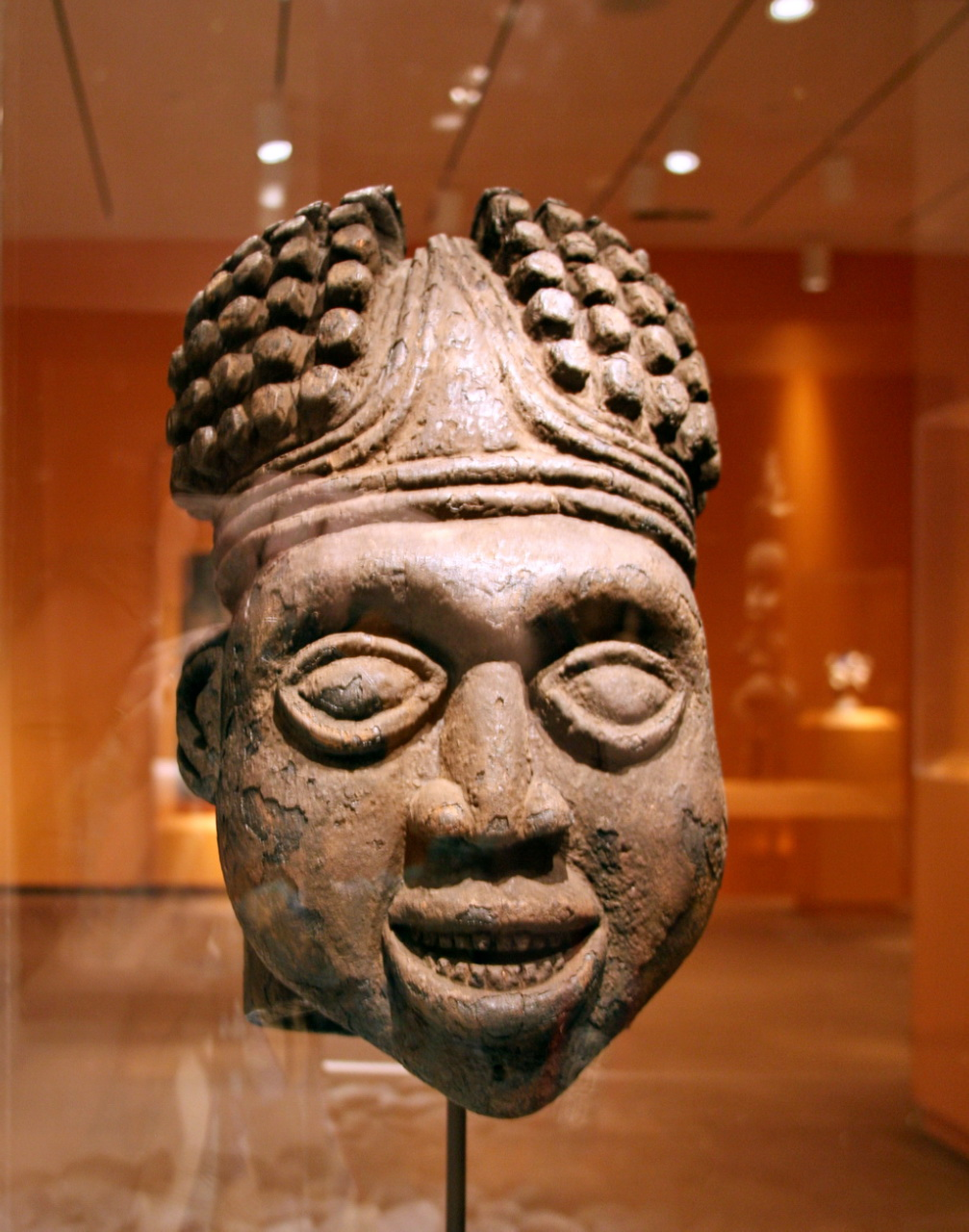
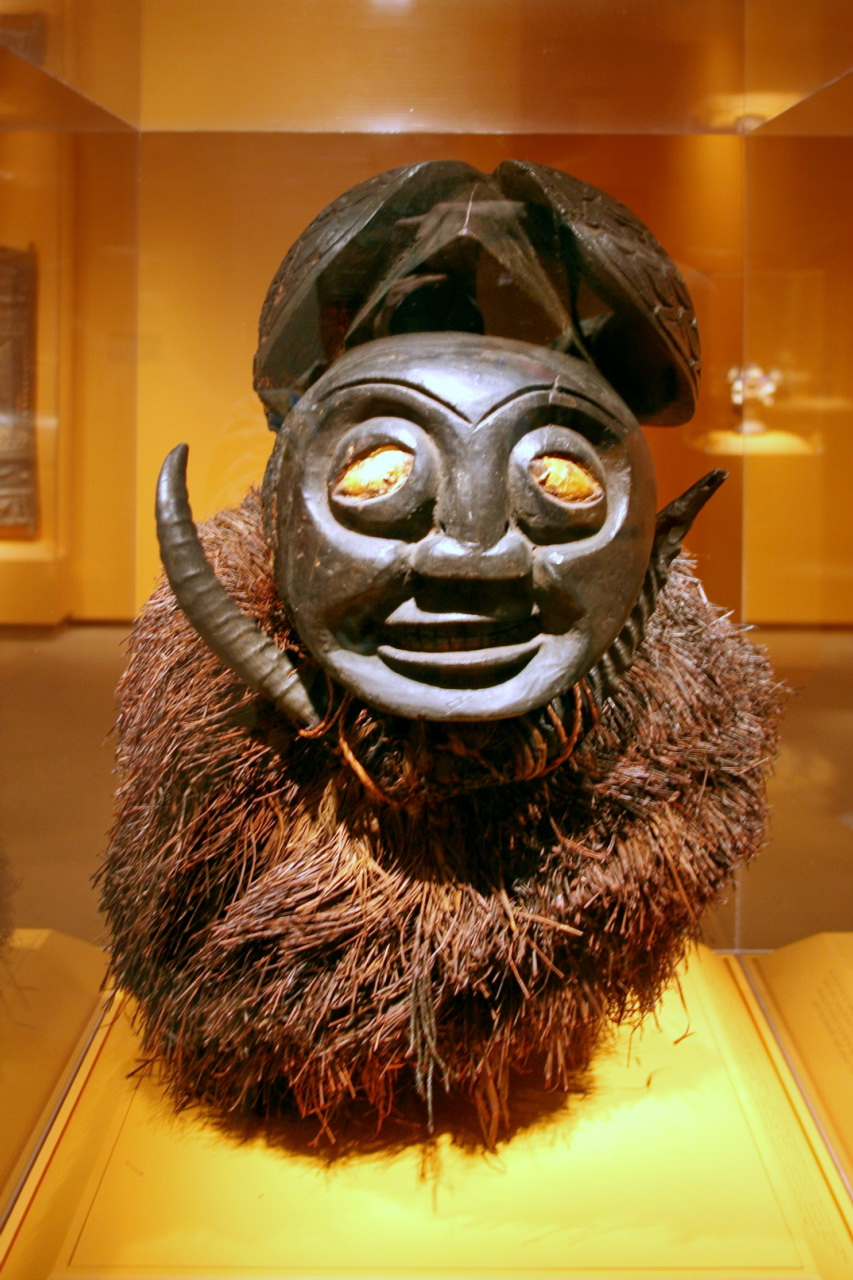
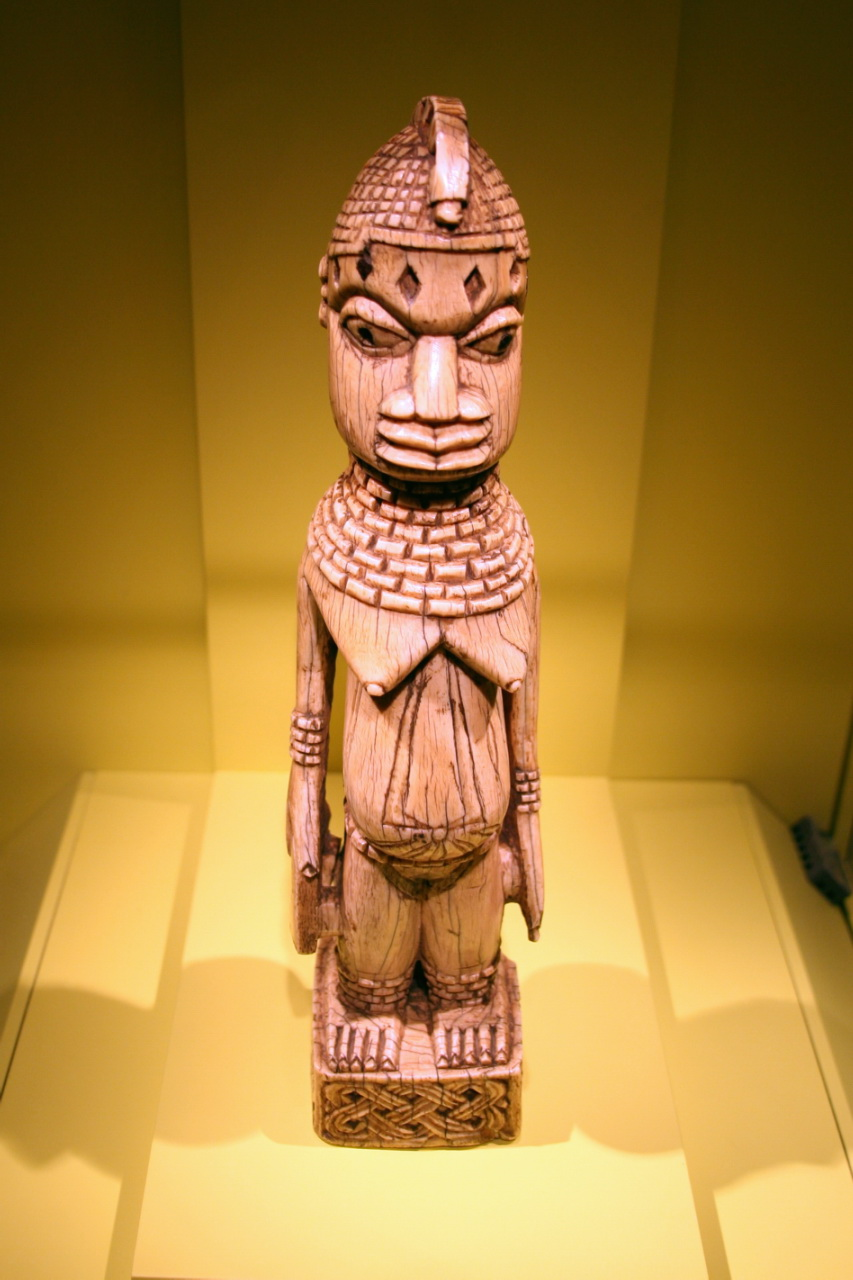
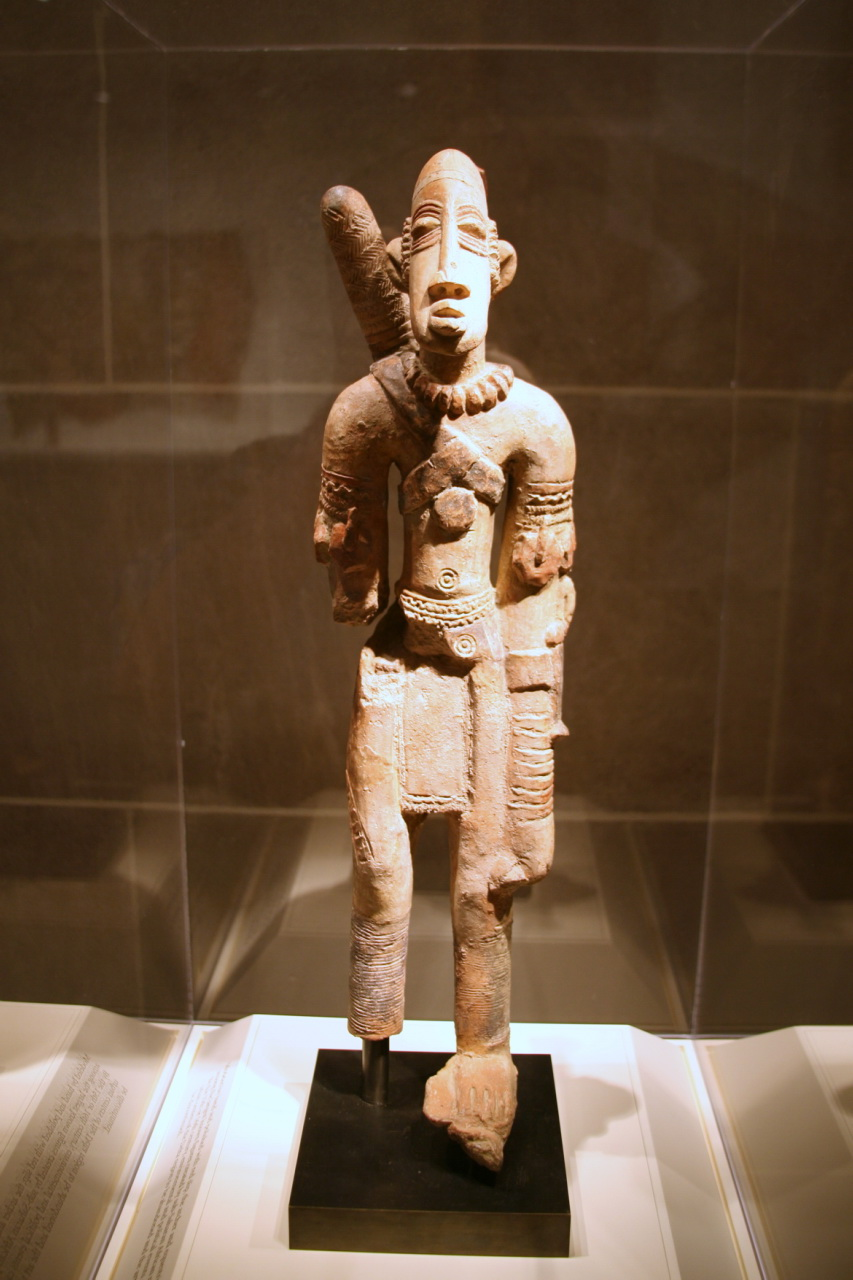
Masks and figurines on display

Karen Milbourne

The museum hosted 130 special exhibitions in its first 25 years, and since joining the Smithsonian, hosts two to three temporary exhibitions annually. In its pre-Smithsonian years, the museum's exhibitions were often loaned, such as from the Renee and Chaim Gross Foundation. In the early '80s, its curators organized "focus" exhibitions centered around a single object from the collection. The museum hosted outside curators and traveling exhibitions. Its shows became more ambitious as its museum relations and budget grew. At the opening of the National Mall building, the museum showed 375 works in five small- and mid-sized exhibits with survey and single-theme scopes. The central exhibit, "African Art in the Cycle of Life", exhibited 88 items in seven sections following seven phases of African tribal life to provide social context for their use. For example, sections such as "Continuity" displayed hand-carved maternity figures, "Transition" displayed coming-of-age ceremonial masks, and "Towards a Secure World" displayed priest and healer items. Many of the pieces were masterpieces borrowed from American and European museums and private collections. Another exhibit showed 100 items from the museum's collection. The remaining three exhibits were smaller: West African textiles, Benin sculptures, and copper reliefs, and useful objects like baskets, hairpins, and snuff boxes. The exhibitions were chosen to confront stereotypes of African art as overly "expressive, ritualistic, and ... undocumented", and instead show perspectives overlooked in Western views on African art.

During the Walker years—the late 1990s and early 2000s—the museum hosted shows on Egyptian contemporary art and Malagasy textiles. A 1997 gift from photographer Constance Stuart Larrabee led to an in-house and traveling exhibition. Walker organized a 1998 retrospective of Yoruba sculptor Olowe of Ise, a rare example of a single-person African art show. The exhibition's accompanying catalogue raisonne was the first such scholarly publication for a traditional African artist. The museum has also held solo exhibitions for artists including Sokari Douglas Camp (1989) and Yinka Shonibare (2010). Exhibitions aimed towards children, such as "Playful Performers", drew crowds under Patton's directorship in the mid-2000s, as did "Treasures" shows from the museum's collection and artist visits. A 2004 show, "Insights", highlighted 30 works about Apartheid South Africa from its collection. In 2013, the museum received its largest gift, $1.8 million from Oman, towards a series that focuses on arts from the country and its links to cultures in the Near East.

The 2015 "Conversations: African and African-American Artworks in Dialogue", featuring works from the private collection of Bill and Camille Cosby, became controversial for opening just as allegations of sexual assault against him became public. The museum's director had a long friendship with the Cosbys—Camille also sat on the museum's advisory board. The exhibition was funded by a $716,000 donation from the Cosbys and planned to bring attention to the museum for its 50th anniversary. As the number of allegations increased, the museum recognized public outcry against the exhibition by creating a sign that acknowledged the allegations and refocused attention on the show's artists and artworks, which remained on view. The Washington Post art and architecture critic Philip Kennicott wrote that the museum violated ethics and hurt its reputation by showcasing a private collection that had not been pledged to the museum. Kennicott challenged whether the painters of Cosby's blue chip collection would have been "silenced" by ending the exhibition early.

== Outreach ==
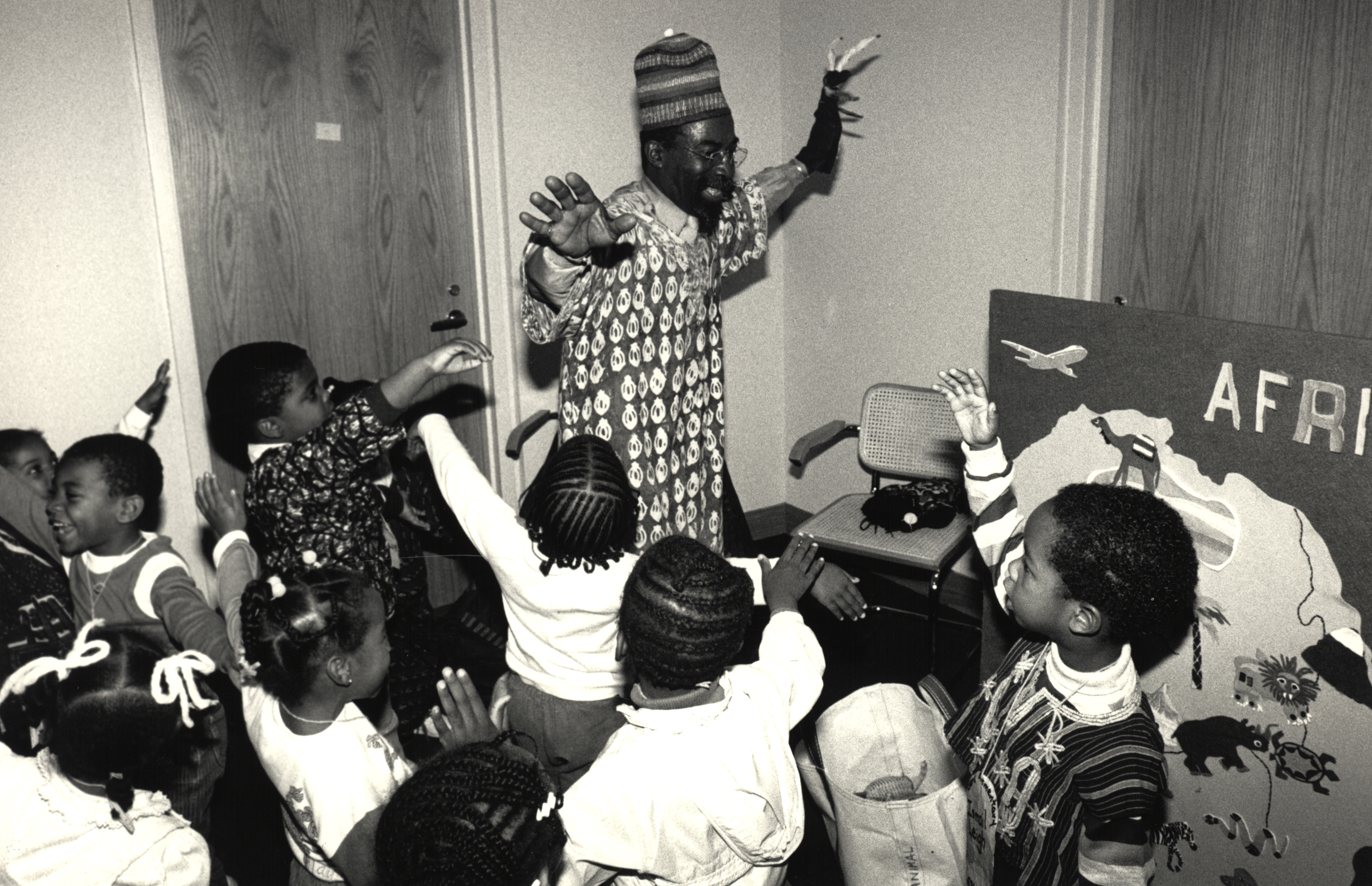
A docent with preschoolers, and the 2016 Voguing Masquerade Ball

The museum prioritized education in its early, pre-Smithsonian years. Its founder referred to the institution as "an education department with a museum attached". The museum had an intimate atmosphere and emphasized programs that taught black cultural heritage. Many children from local schools attended the museum, which hosted exhibits including an exercise on "how to look at art" in comparing traditional African and modern art. Through the '90s, school groups took guided tours with trained docents. The new location on the National Mall increased the museum's unguided visits.

In the early 1980s, the Smithsonian found that few of its 20 million annual visitors were of a racial minority despite the city's large black population. It subsequently created a committee to address the disparity. As the African art museum had not yet moved to the National Mall, it served a black constituency in a racially mixed neighborhood, with racially integrated staff and programming popular among local school groups with its regular films, folk stories, and lectures. The museum also offered workshops on African stripweave and talking drum. Patton, the museum director in the mid-2000s, said that the museum was not well known in Washington, as only half of the taxi drivers knew its location. Patton's tenure included shows targeted towards children. As a result, the museum briefly served more children than adults. Around this time, the museum held about ten special events a year. The Washington Post wrote that the museum "struggled ... to attract visitors and donations" in 2016, which was exacerbated by the Cosby controversy.

== Reception ==
At the National Mall building's opening, three New York Times reviewers criticized its design elements, namely the architect's choice of materials and lack of natural light underground. Architecture critic Paul Goldberger considered the above-ground elements a "clunky ... pavilion of granite" whose elements were "woefully simplistic", unsubtle, and awkward compared to the Smithsonian Castle in the distance. He mildly praised the complex's "clever" layout and its maximized underground utility with minimal above-ground changes. Goldberger admired the building's craftsmanship, interiors, and responsive gallery spaces. The other two Times reviewers, in turn, were unsettled to see works once associated with the outdoors instead displayed with no natural light, and feared the precedent for other museums, adding that the lack of light was unaccommodating to both viewers and the works. The museum's director, however, noted that natural light would cause conservation issues for their wood sculptures. The museum felt restrained as part of the larger complex, one critic wrote, and deficient in style.

Of the opening exhibition, the New York Times critic described the exhibits as often austere and understated in irregularly sized rooms that sometimes overwhelmed its contents. She was fondest of the small exhibits and the works imported from other museums. The other Times reviewer found the museum's collection larger but "less spectacular" than that of the Metropolitan Museum of Art, though the latter had more works available when it began its collection. The opening exhibits, overall, piqued viewer curiosity in the subject and underscored the importance of religious belief and craftsmanship in the displayed works. The opening's reviewer struggled to generalize the African works, which ranged from face- and figure-focused to the elegant, geometric abstraction of West African strip weaving. The other reviewer added that the museum's textiles exhibition overemphasized the connection between African art and everyday life, as the textiles had comparatively weaker "imaginative ... impact".

"It's impossible", a reviewer wrote in The Washington Times, "not to be profoundly moved" by the museum's 2004 Apartheid exhibition. She praised the museum's contemporary collection but said that the works fought against their surroundings—the dedicated contemporary gallery was a good space with a poor ambiance.
