= First Church of Christ, Scientist (Reno, Nevada) =

Historic church in Nevada, United States

- U.S. National Register of Historic Places
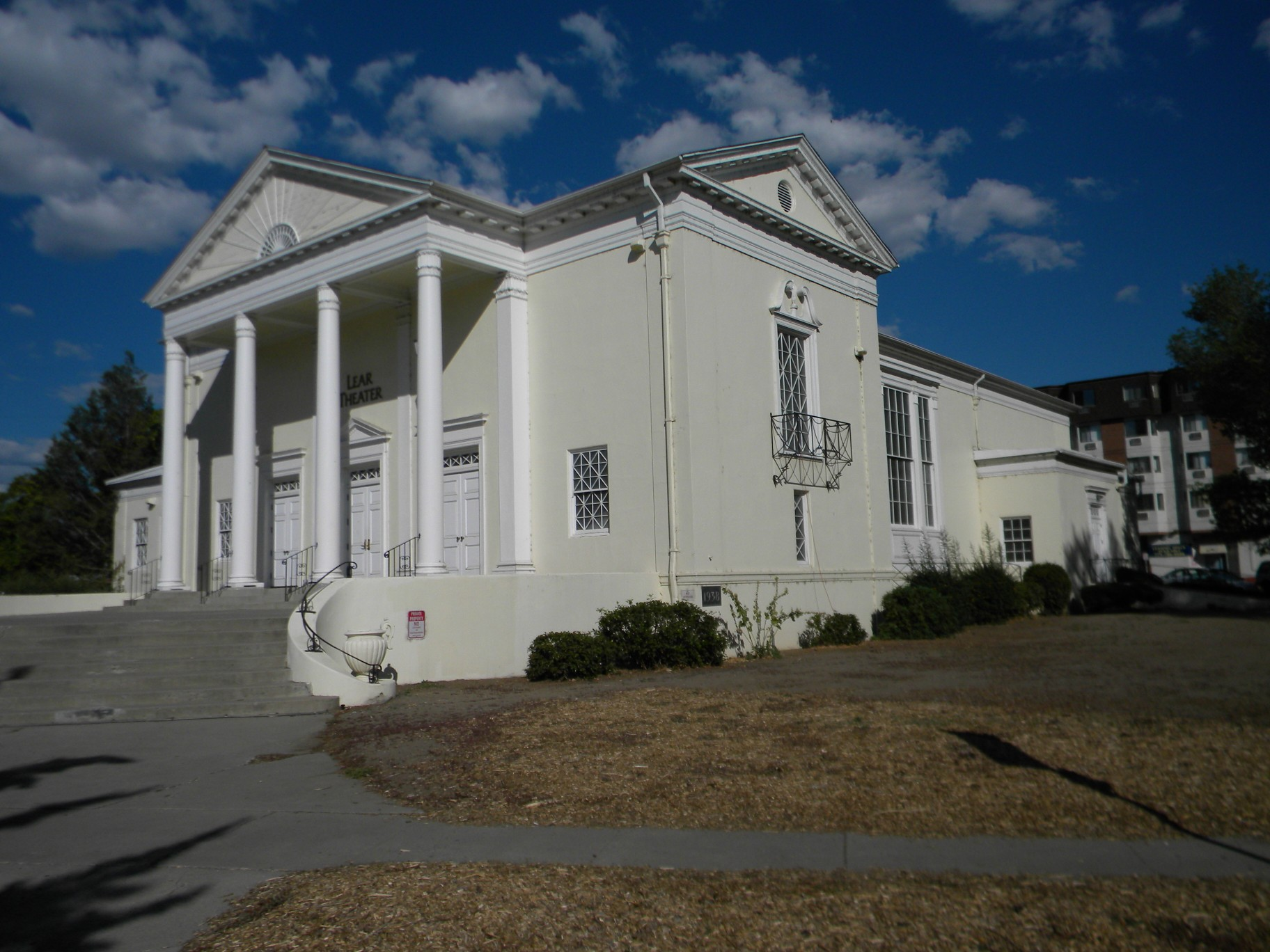

- Location within Nevada Location within the United States
- Location: 501 Riverside Dr., Reno, Nevada
- Coordinates: 39°31′27″N 119°49′6″W
- Area: 0.6 acres (0.24 ha)
- Built: 1939
- Architect: Paul Revere Williams; builder: Boudwin, Walker
- Architectural style: Classical Revival
- NRHP reference No.: 99000939
- Added to NRHP: August 20, 1999

The former First Church of Christ, Scientist, built in 1939, is an historic Classical revival style Christian Science church edifice located at 501 Riverside Drive, overlooking the Truckee River in Reno, Nevada. Anna Frandsen Loomis, a wealthy local Christian Scientist, underwrote the $120,000 cost of the building, including land acquisition and architect's fees. She was responsible for hiring noted Los Angeles architect Paul Revere Williams, the first African-American member of the AIA. In 1998 the congregation sold the building and used the funds from the sale to construct a new church at 795 West Peckham Lane. Church member and local theater patron Moya Lear donated $1.1 million to the Reno-Sparks Theater Community Coalition, which used the funding to purchase the First Church of Christ, Scientist and renamed it the Lear Theater.

On December 28, 1982, the building was added to the Nevada State Register of Historic Places. and on August 20, 1999, it was added to the National Register of Historic Places.

== See also ==
- List of Registered Historic Places in Nevada
- List of former Christian Science churches, societies and buildings
- First Church of Christ, Scientist (disambiguation)
