= Rancho Boca de la Playa =

Mexican land grant in California

Coordinates: 33.470°N 117.640°W

Rancho Boca de la Playa was a 6,607-acre (26.74 km^{2}) Mexican land grant in present-day Orange County, California given in 1846 by Governor Pío Pico to Emigdio Véjar. The name refers to the wetlands estuary at the 'mouth of the beach,' or 'boca de la playa' in Spanish. This is the most southerly grant in Orange County, and extended along the Pacific coast from San Juan Creek in the south of present-day San Juan Capistrano south to San Clemente.

== History ==
Emigdio Véjar (1810–1863) born in Los Angeles, was the son of Francisco Salvador Véjar, who came to Alta California in 1790 as a leather jacket soldier (Soldado de Cuero). Emigdio Véjar was Juez de Campo at Los Angeles, in 1838. He was mayordomo of Mission San Juan Capistrano, and Juez de Paz at San Juan Capistrano in 1844-45. In 1843, he married María Rafaela Avila (1818–), daughter of Antonio Ygnacio Avila. In 1845, he delivered the Mission and all that belonged to it to John Forster. Véjar was granted Rancho Boca de la Playa, one and half square leagues of former Mission San Juan Capistrano land, in 1846. In 1852, Emigdio Vejar married Ysabel Cota.

With the cession of California to the United States following the Mexican-American War, the 1848 Treaty of Guadalupe Hidalgo provided that the land grants would be honored. As required by the Land Act of 1851, a claim for Rancho Boca de la Playa was filed with the Public Land Commission in 1852, and the grant was patented to Emigdio Vejar in 1879.

In 1860, Véjar sold the rancho to Juan Avila, grantee of Rancho Niguel, who later conveyed it to his son-in-law, Pablo Pryor. Pablo Pryor (1839–1878), the son of Nathaniel Miguel Pryor and Maria Teresa Sepulveda, married Rosa Modesta Avila, Juan Avila's daughter, in 1864. In 1855, Pablo Pryor, filed a lawsuit to perfect title in his claimed two-fifths interest in the Rancho de los Palos Verdes. Pablo Pryor was poisoned and died in 1878. Juan Avila's other son-in-law, Marcus A. Forster (a grandson of Don Juan Forster who married Guadalupe Avila), then acquired the ranch. Forster sold a strip of the land to the San Bernardino and San Diego Railway. The railway, in collaboration with the California Central Railway, built a rail line between Los Angeles and San Diego, with a station at Capistrano. The station was initially named San Juan by the Sea, but in 1910 was changed to Serra, the name of the newly formed school district. This area is now known as Capistrano Beach.

In 1906, Cornelio Echenique, Marcus Forster's son-in-law, sold the land to the Goldschmidt brothers, who planned to plant vineyards on the land. The Goldschmidts later sold the land to Ole Hanson, who developed San Clemente, California. The Goldschmidts bought some parcels back, and built the Goldschmidt House on one of them.

== Historic sites of the Rancho ==
- Pablo Pryor Adobe/Hide House. This is possibly the oldest standing adobe dwelling in California. Hides from Mission San Juan Capistrano were tanned and stored here between 1820 and 1840. In 1936 it was occupied by Theresa Pryor Yorba (1866–), a daughter of Pablo Pryor and Rosa Avila, the wife of Miguel Yorba.
