= Lon Chaney Cabin =

Historic building in California

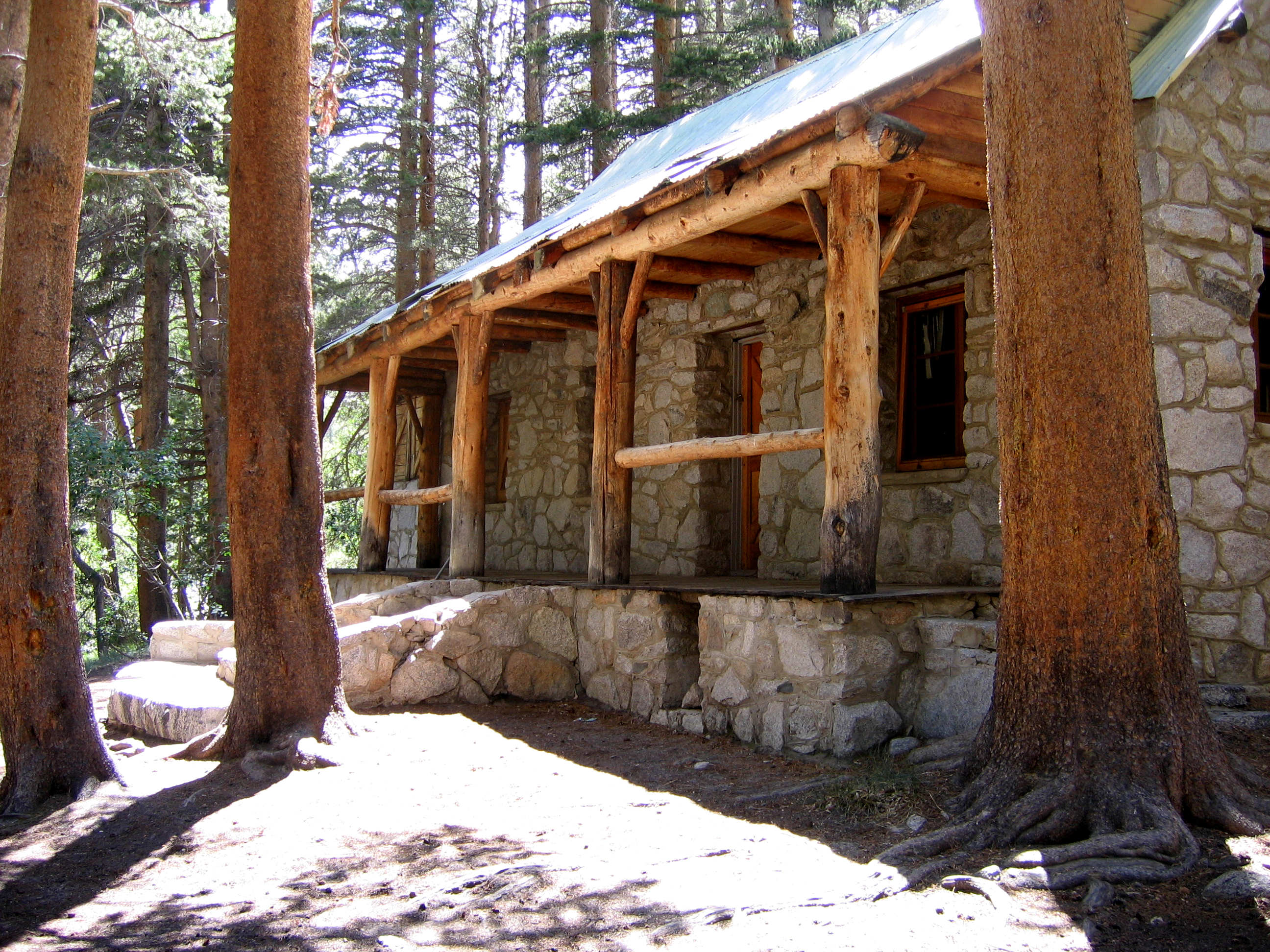
- The building's front in 2007

- Location within California Lon Chaney Cabin (the United States)

General information
- Architectural style: Rustic
- Location: Inyo County, California
- Coordinates: 37.1357°N 118.4657°W
- Elevation: 9,200 ft (2,800 m)
- Named for: Lon Chaney
- Year built: 1929-1930
- Cost: $12,000 (equivalent to $225,000 in 2025)
- Owner: United States Forest Service

Technical details
- Material: Granite and lodgepole pine
- Floor area: 1,288 sq ft (119.7 m^{2})

Design and construction
- Architect: Paul R. Williams

The Lon Chaney Cabin is a historic building in Inyo County, California. Constructed in 1930 as a retreat for the early 20th-century actor Lon Chaney by Paul R. Williams, it was used as a retreat by Chaney. As of 2024, the rustic-style cabin is closed to the public and is currently being used as a ranger station. It is in Cienega Mirth near the Big Pine Creek, known for its trout. (Note: Chaney was a devoted fisherman and one of the first promoters of the catch-and-release method.)

== History ==
The cabin was built from 1929 to 1930, costing $12,000 (equivalent to $225,000 in 2025). It was designed by Paul R. Williams, who designed other buildings for celebrities such as Frank Sinatra. It was the only alpine structure he ever worked on.

Chaney rarely used the cabin, as he died of lung cancer in 1930. It was sold in 1932 and 1955. In 1964, the Wilderness Act was passed, slating the cabin for destruction until it was realized that the dynamite that was to be used to destroy the building would also damage the surrounding forest.

== Features ==
The building is made from granite and lodgepole pine. It is rectangular and has a gable roof and 2 ft (0.61 m) thick rock walls. It has a tongue and groove floor with a rock fireplace. Light was provided by a hanging kerosene lamp.

No money is provided to maintain the cabin's interior, but volunteer groups routinely maintain the exterior.
