= Jay Paley House =

Designed by Paul R. Williams

Coordinates: 34.08783°N 118.43031°W

- Location within Western Los Angeles
- Alternative names: Barron Hilton Mansion Brooklawn estate

General information
- Architectural style: Hollywood Regency
- Location: Benedict Canyon, Los Angeles, 1060 Brooklawn Drive, Los Angeles, United States of America
- Named for: Jay Paley
- Construction started: 1932 (pool & pool house), 1935 (main house)
- Completed: 1936
- Renovated: 1945, 1961
- Cost: $100,000
- Owner: Jay & Lilian Paley (construction-1961), Barron & Marilyn Hilton (1961-2019), Hilton Family(2019-2021), Eric Schmidt (2021- present)

Technical details
- Size: 15,110 square feet (1,404 m^{2})
- Floor count: 2
- Grounds: 2.55 acres (10,300 m^{2}), originally 6 acres (2.4 ha)

Design and construction
- Architect: Paul R. Williams
- Other designers: Harriet R. Shellenberger (original interior), Kathryn Crawford (1961 interior), Edward Huntsman-Trout (landscape)
- Main contractor: O'Neal and Sons

Other information
- Number of rooms: 32, including 13 bedrooms and 12 bathrooms

Jay Paley House is a large house at 1060 Brooklawn Drive, in the Bel Air neighborhood of Los Angeles. It was designed by Paul R. Williams for businessman Jacob Jay Paley (1885-1960) and his wife Lilian Paley (Sevin) (1893-1954). The 13 bedroom, 15,110-square-foot (1,404 m^{2}) house was built in 1935 on a 6-acre (2.4 ha) estate.

== Background ==
Jay Paley and his brother Samuel were Jewish Russian immigrants who had founded the Congress Cigar Company, manufacturers of the La Palina brand, in Chicago in the 1890s. The Paley family founded the Columbia Broadcasting System (CBS), and Paley subsequently sold a substantial shareholding in 1928 for several million dollars. He became a film producer in the early 1930s, and in 1934 founded JayPay Productions with film executive Walter Wanger in association with Paramount Studios in 1934. He sold further CBS shares to Samuel Paley, his brother, and his nephew William S. Paley to finance his film production company.

Paley and his wife Lilian moved to Los Angeles, and the house was commissioned. Williams had previously designed a house for Jay Paley's nephew, William S. Paley, at 200 South Mapleton Drive that was completed in 1934. Paley subsequently invested in the Arrowhead Springs Hotel, which was also designed by Williams.

== Hilton ownership ==
After Paley's death in 1961, the furnishings were sold at auction and the estate subdivided and developed. The house, retaining the pool & tennis court, sold for $475,000 ($5.12 million in 2025) to Barron Hilton. The businessman and hotelier lived at the house until his death in 2019. The Hilton family sold the estate in May 2021 to former Google CEO Eric Schmidt for $61.5 million.

== Design ==
The two-story brick house is designed as a modified H-plan, made up of 32 rooms. The northwest and southwest wings and center are extended to form an E-configuration from the flat facade. The entrance door is framed with wooden columns and a pediment. The rear of the house also has extended northeast and southwest wings, with a two-story conical roof supported by columns summouting the semicircular southeast wing. A central hall runs the entire length of the house from north to south. A large living room is to the right, it opens to a small garden and ornamental pond. The first floor is the site of the music room and the library. The east side of the house contains the dining room, a breakfast room, and four maids rooms with a separate living room. A private garden for the servants is located next to the service wing.

Writing in The Legendary Estates of Beverly Hills, Jeffrey Hyland felt that the house marked a 'new direction' for Williams as "He started with the traditional English Georgian style and then gave the residence a thoroughly modernist spirit, creating a residence that was both traditional and contemporary". The style of the house has also been described as Hollywood Regency and English Georgian.

The house was built by the building contractors O'Neal and Sons, at a cost of $100,000 (equivalent to $2,348,301 in 2025).

=== Interiors ===
The interior of the house was designed by Harriet R. Shellenberger, her interior designs were removed in 1961 following Paley's death. The interior was redesigned by Kathryn Crawford in the 1960s; Crawford's designs for the house were featured in Architectural Digest in September 1968, including gold bathroom faucets across its 13 bathrooms. After redecorating, Hilton displayed his collection of guns and model airplanes. The house also has an 80-seat movie screening room and an elevator.

=== Pool ===
The swimming pool and the pool house precede the main house and were designed by Williams to a Classical design with landscape architect c.1932 and built by the Paddock Pool Complex. The pool house contains a bar and grill and games room. The success of the swimming complex convinced Paley to commission the main house from Williams. The pool is known as the Zodiac pool as the base features the 12 signs of the Zodiac in blue, yellow and gold tiles imported from France with a sunburst design. The pool house was featured on the cover of Architectural Digest in 1933.
