= Paul R. Williams =

American architect (1894–1980)

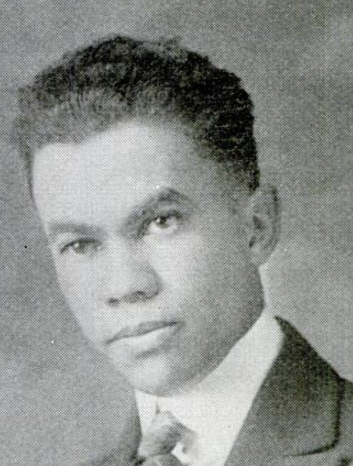
- Williams in 1917
- Born: Paul Revere Williams; February 18, 1894; Los Angeles, California, U.S.
- Died: January 23, 1980 (aged 85); Los Angeles, California, U.S.
- Education: University of Southern California
- Occupation: Architect
- Buildings: 1926 28th Street YMCA, Los Angeles; 1935 Rene Faron Residence; 1938 First Church of Christ, Scientist (Reno, Nevada); 1939 Saks Fifth Avenue, Beverly Hills; 1940 Pueblo del Rio Housing Development (joint venture); 1948 Golden State Mutual Life Los Angeles; 1949 and 1963 Perino's Restaurant (alterations of existing buildings); 1951 Williams Residence; 1953 Imperial Courts Housing Development, Los Angeles; 1958 Los Angeles Superior Court; 1961 LAX Theme Building (joint venture); 1961 La Concha Motel; 1962 St. Jude Hospital, Memphis; 1968 First AME Church, Los Angeles; 1964 Beverly Sunset Medical Center Los Angeles
- Projects: Woodrow Wilson Senior High School

Paul Revere Williams, FAIA (February 18, 1894 – January 23, 1980) was an American architect based in Los Angeles, California. Most of the buildings he designed were in Southern California and included the homes of numerous celebrities, such as Frank Sinatra, Lucille Ball and Desi Arnaz, Lon Chaney, Barbara Stanwyck, and Charles Correll. He also designed many commercial, institutional and civic buildings.

== Early life and education ==
Williams came from a family of middle class Memphis residents: Chester Stanley and Lila Wright Williams. They migrated to Los Angeles in 1893 with their son, Chester, to start a fruit business, but were not successful.

Paul was born in Los Angeles on February 18, 1894. His father died in 1896 from tuberculosis and his mother two years later from the same illness in 1898, leaving the boys in foster care. He was eventually adopted by C.I. Clarkson and his wife. Williams was the only African-American student in his elementary school.

He studied at the Los Angeles School of Art and Design and at the Los Angeles branch of the New York Beaux-Arts Institute of Design Atelier, subsequently working as a landscape architect with Wilbur Cook, Jr. He studied architectural engineering from 1916 to 1919 at the University of Southern California, where he earned his degree, designing several residential buildings while a student there. Williams became a certified architect in California in 1921 and the first certified African-American architect west of the Mississippi.

== Personal life ==
Williams married Della Mae Givens on June 27, 1917, at the First AME Church in Los Angeles. They had three children: Paul Revere Williams Jr. (born and died June 30, 1925, buried in Evergreen Cemetery, Los Angeles); Marilyn Frances Williams (born December 25, 1926) and Norma Lucille Williams Harvey (born September 18, 1928).

== Career ==
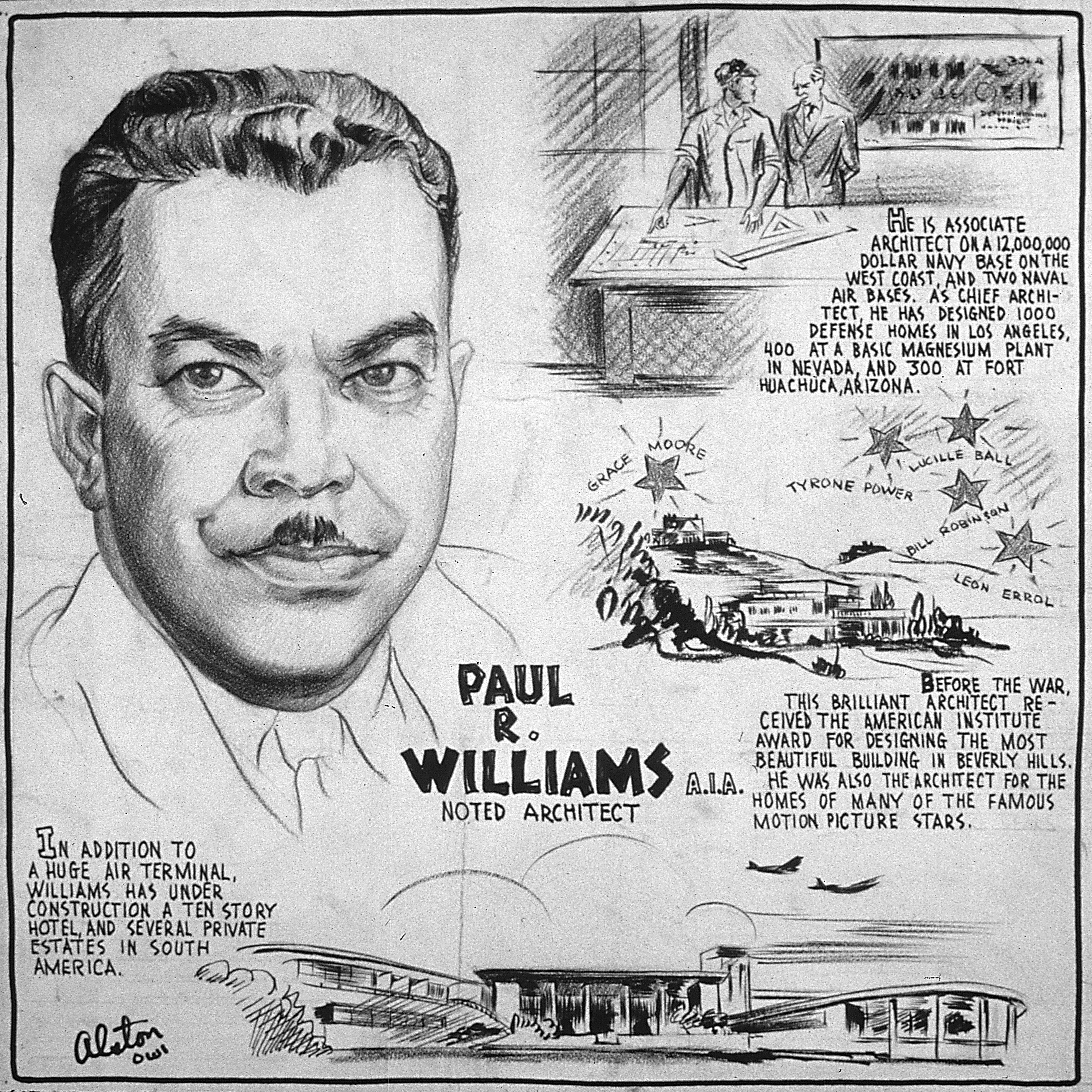
Poster from Office of War Information. Domestic Operations Branch. News Bureau, 1943

Williams won an architectural competition at age 25, and three years later opened his own office. Known as an outstanding draftsman, he perfected the skill of sketching "upside down." This skill was developed because in the 1920s many of his white clients felt uncomfortable sitting directly next to a Black man. He learned to sketch upside down so that he could sit across the desk from his clients who would see his sketches right-side-up.

Struggling to gain attention, he served on the first Los Angeles City Planning Commission in 1920.

From 1921 through 1924, Williams worked for Los Angeles architect John C. Austin, eventually becoming chief draftsman, before establishing his own office.

In 1923, Williams became the first African-American member of the American Institute of Architects (AIA).

In 1939, he won the AIA Award of Merit for his design of the MCA Building in Beverly Hills (now headquarters of the Paradigm Talent Agency).

At one point in his career Williams became interested in prefabricated structures. He worked together with Wallace Neff to design experimental Airform structures which were small homes that only took a few days to construct using simple materials.

A. Quincy Jones (1913–79) was an architect who is claimed to have hired Williams and later collaborated with him on projects in Palm Springs, including the Palm Springs Tennis Club (1947) and the Town & Country (1948) and Romanoff's on the Rocks (1948) restaurants.

Lockheed and Guerdon Industries recruited Williams to design a concept for a car-alternative travel system in Las Vegas. He developed the idea of a monorail-like system called the Skylift Magi-Cab that would bring people to and from McCarran Airport and the city center.

During World War II, Williams worked for the Navy Department as an architect.

During his career Williams designed over 2,000 buildings.

== Awards, recognition and honors ==
=== During his lifetime ===
In 1948, the anthology radio drama Destination Freedom, by Richard Durham, recapped his earlier life.

In 1951, Williams won the Omega Psi Phi fraternity, Man of the Year award and in 1953 he received the Spingarn Medal from the NAACP for his outstanding contributions as an architect and member of the African-American community.

Williams also received honorary doctorates from Lincoln University of Missouri (doctor of science, 1941), Howard University (doctor of architecture, 1952), and the Tuskegee Institute (doctor of fine arts, 1956).

In 1956, he won an award for service, from Wisdom magazine, for "contributions to knowledge and distinguished service to mankind."

In 1957, he became the first Black member to be inducted into the AIA's College of Fellows. An April 2, 1957, letter from the Executive Secretary of AIA, offered Williams the honor of Fellowship and membership in the College of Fellows "for your notable contribution in Public Service."

=== Posthumous honors ===
USC listed him among its distinguished alumni in the television commercial for the school shown during its football games in 2004.

The American Institute of Architects (AIA) gave him its gold medal in 2017, 37 years after Williams's death.

Our profession desperately needs more architects like Paul Williams. His pioneering career has encouraged others to cross a chasm of historic biases. I can't think of another architect whose work embodies the spirit of the Gold Medal better. His recognition demonstrates a significant shift in the equity for the profession and the institute.

— William J. Bates, FAIA, in his support of Williams's nomination for the AIA Gold Medal., Architectural Digest

== Publications ==
Book: The Small Home of Tomorrow (1945), with a successor volume New Homes for Today (1946).

Essay: "I Am a Negro," American Magazine (1937). Reprinted in Ebony Magazine (1986) The following is a quote from that essay:

I came to realize that I was being condemned, not by a lack of ability, but by my color. I passed through successive stages of bewilderment, inarticulate protest, resentment, and, finally, reconciliation to the status of my race. Eventually, however, as I grew older and thought more clearly, I found in my condition an incentive to personal accomplishment, an inspiring challenge. Without having the wish to "show them," I developed a fierce desire to "show myself." I wanted to vindicate every ability I had. I wanted to acquire new abilities. I wanted to prove that I, as an individual, deserved a place in the world.

== Works ==
=== Private homes ===
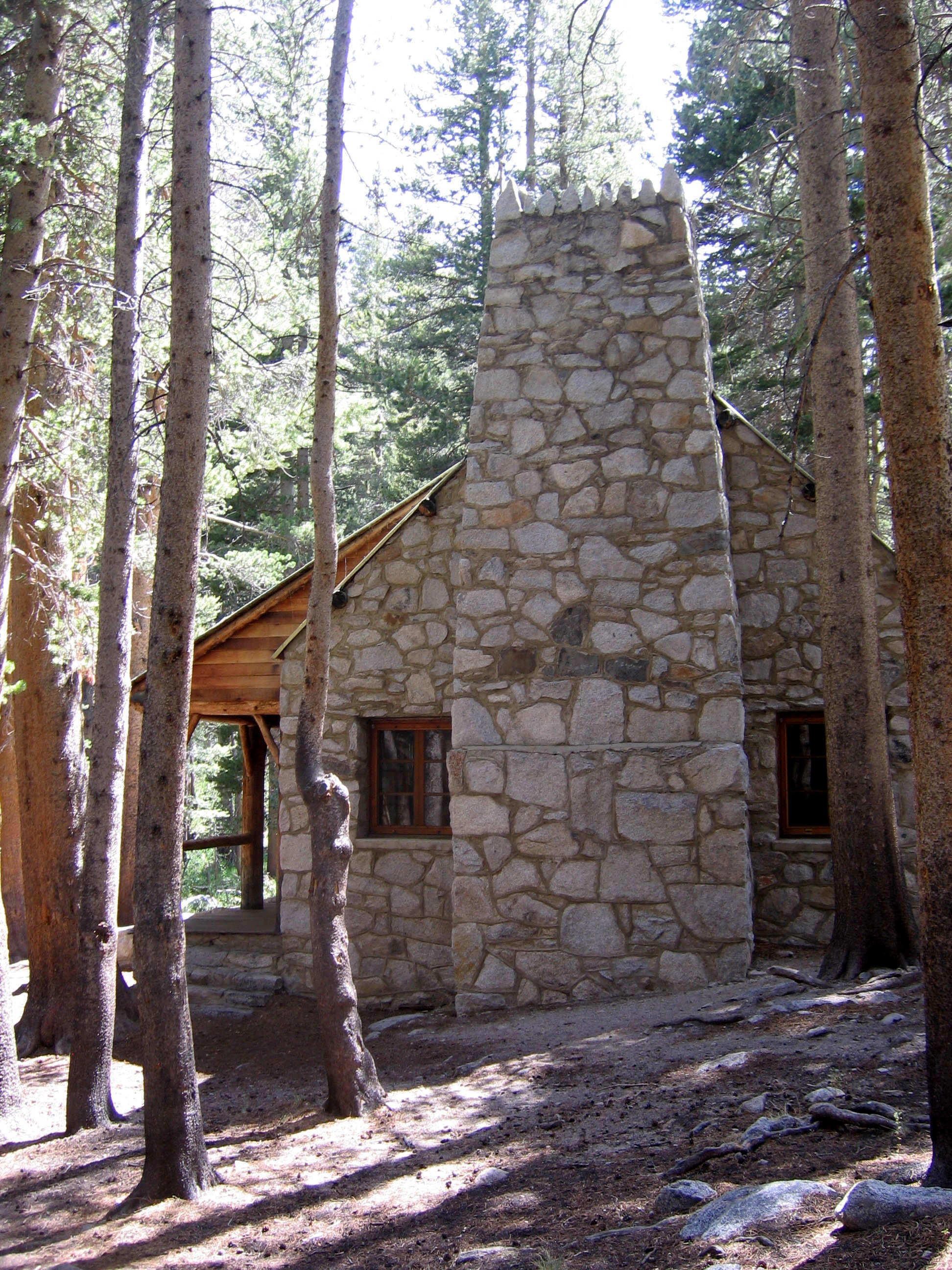
Lon Chaney Cabin designed by Williams — Inyo National Forest

Williams designed more than 2,000 private homes, most of which were in the Hollywood Hills and the Mid-Wilshire area of Los Angeles along with his own home in Lafayette Square in the West Adams District. He also designed at least one home in the San Rafael district along with many others in Pasadena and La Cañada Flintridge. The Linda Vista Area of Pasadena has many Spanish Colonial and French Country homes of his design including many commissioned by business magnates (Chrysler Corporation) and actors.

His most famous homes were for celebrities, and he was well regarded for his mastery of various architectural styles. Modern interpretations of Tudor-revival, French Chateau, Regency, French Country, and Mediterranean architecture were all within his vernacular. One notable home, the Jay Paley House (1935), which he designed for Jay Paley in Holmby Hills, and later the residence of Barron Hilton, was used as the 'Colby mansion' in exterior scenes for The Colbys television series. Williams's client list included Frank Sinatra (the notorious pushbutton house), Bill "Bojangles" Robinson, Lon Chaney, Sr., Lucille Ball, Julie London, Tyrone Power (two houses), Barbara Stanwyck, Bert Lahr, Charles Correll, Will Hays, Zasu Pitts, and Danny Thomas.

In contrast to these mansions, Williams co-designed with Hilyard Robinson, the first federally funded public housing projects of the post-war period (Langston Terrace in Washington, D.C.) and later the Pueblo del Rio project in southeast Los Angeles.

Williams famously remarked upon the bitter irony of the fact that most of the homes he designed, and whose construction he oversaw, were on parcels whose deeds included segregation covenants barring Black people from purchasing them.

A number of his works are listed on the National Register of Historic Places.

=== List of works ===
==== In Los Angeles ====
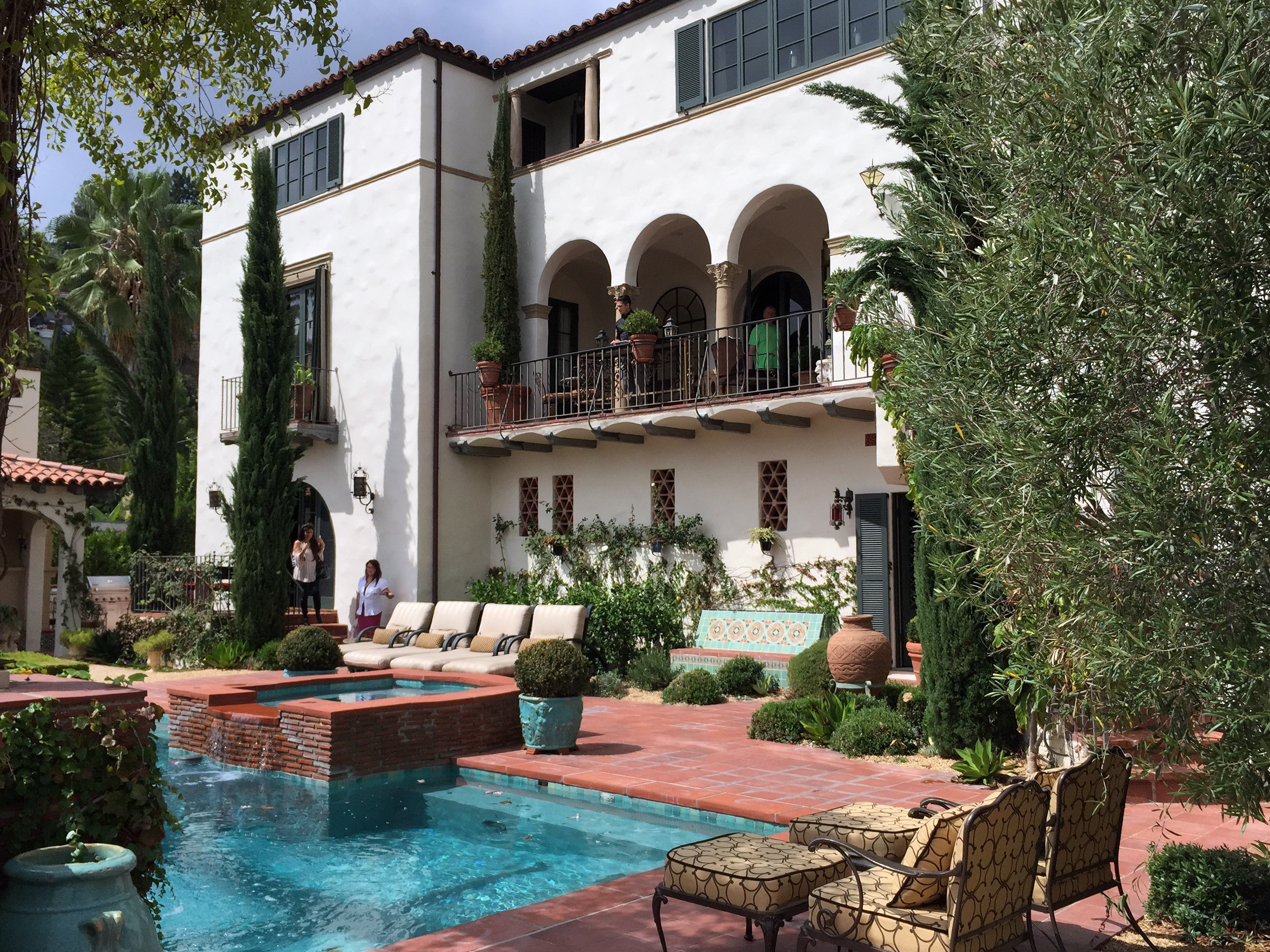
Victor Rossetti House, a Spanish Revival style estate built in 1928

- 28th Street YMCA, NRHP-listed
- 421 La Fayette Park Place
- Angeles Mesa Elementary School
- Angelus Funeral Home, NRHP-listed
- First African Methodist Episcopal Church of Los Angeles
- Founder's Church of Religious Science (1960)
- Golden State Mutual Life Insurance Building (1949)
- Hollywood YMCA
- Jay Paley House (1935)
- Kelly Music Co. Building (1929)
- Kenneth Hahn Hall of Administration (Stanton, Stockwell, Williams and Wilson)
- Los Angeles International Airport
  - 501 World Way parking structure (1965)
  - Theme Building (1960s)
- Marina Del Rey Middle School
- Stanley Mosk Courthouse (Stanton, Stockwell, Williams and Wilson)
- Nickerson Gardens
- Perino's (1950 redesign and 1954 renovation)
- Pueblo del Rio Housing Project (1941)
- Second Baptist Church, NRHP-listed
- University of California Los Angeles
  - LaKretz Botany Building
  - Pritzker Hall Psychology Tower
- Woodrow Wilson High School
- One or more works in the 27th Street Historic District, NRHP-listed

==== Elsewhere in California ====
- 9600 Wilshire Boulevard, Beverly Hills (with Parkinson & Parkinson)
- Al Jolson's tomb at Hillside Memorial Park, Culver City
- Arrowhead Springs Hotel & Spa, San Bernardino
- Beverly Hills Hotel (1940s redesign and addition)
- Baldwin Hills Crenshaw Plaza (original anchor stores) (late 1940s)
- Cord Estate (late 1930s), Beverly Hills
- The Gatehouse (1940), Lake Arrowhead
- Goldschmidt House, San Clemente, NRHP-listed
- Palm Springs Tennis Club
- Roberts House Ranch "The Tropical Terrace", Malibu
- Seaview Palos Verdes (1960)

==== In Nevada ====
- Carver Park Homes
- El Reno Apartments (1937), Reno
- First Church of Christ, Scientist, Reno NRHP-listed
- Luella Garvey House (1934), Reno
- Guardian Angel Cathedral, Las Vegas
- Herman House (1936), Reno
- La Concha Motel
- Olif H. Nelson House, 1224 Park Cir, Las Vegas (1951)
- One or more works in Berkley Square, Las Vegas

==== Elsewhere ====
- Hilltop Farm house (1934), Cedar Rapids, IA
- Hotel Nutibara (1945), Medellin, Colombia

=== Professional records ===
In 1955, Williams was hired to transform a W.W.Woolworth store at the corner of Broadway and 45th in Los Angeles into the Broadway Federal Savings and Loan. When the bank opened, Williams safeguarded much of his business papers in the bank. During the fires that consumed the area after the Rodney King trial in 1992, the Broadway Bank burned and it was feared that much of Williams' archives had been lost. Williams family had carefully curated the documents and Williams' granddaughter, Karen Elyse Hudson, agreed to the acquisition of the archive by the Getty Research Institute and the USC School of Architecture. In June 2020, Milton S. F. Curry of USC announced the contents of the archive: about 35,000 architectural plans, 10,000 original drawings, blueprints, photographs, and correspondence that help "fill the gaps of Los Angeles Modernism in the 20th century."

== Death ==
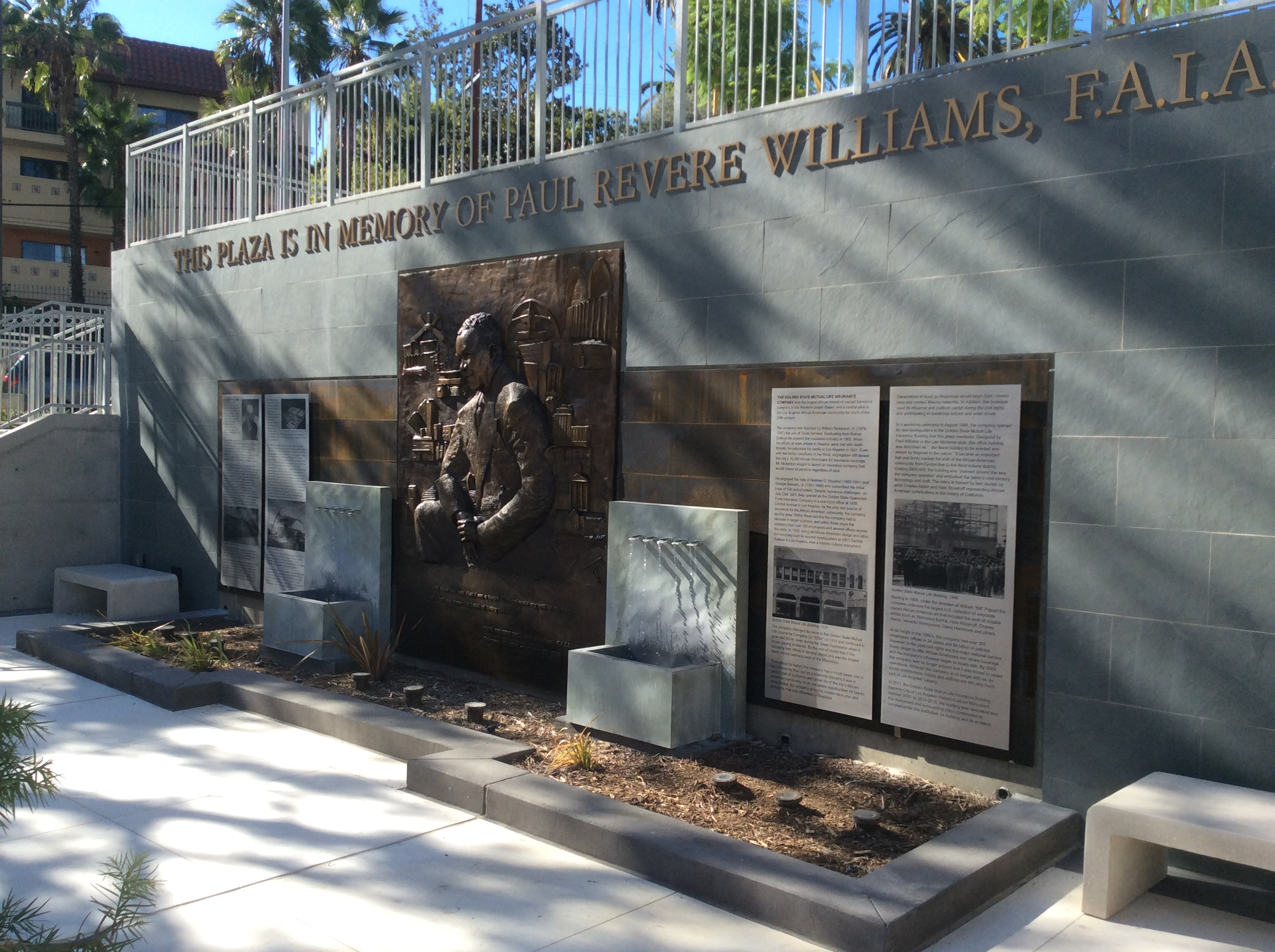
Memorial to Paul R Williams north of the Golden State Mutual Life Insurance Building dedicated October 2015

Williams retired his practice in 1973, and died from diabetes on January 23, 1980, at age 85. His funeral was held at the First AME Church he designed, and the presiding minister, Cecil Murray, was joined in the pulpit by Dr. William H.D. Hornaday, the Senior Minister of Founder's Church of Religious Science, that Williams also had designed. Dr. Hornaday described Williams as a gentle and courtly man of the highest integrity. Williams was interred in the Sanctuary of Radiance, Manchester Garden Mausoleum at Inglewood Park Cemetery, Inglewood. Williams's widow Della Williams (1895–1996) co-founded (with Fannie Williams) 'The Wilfandel Club' Established November 21, 1945, by black women active in the Los Angeles, California, community. The Wilfandel Club's goal has been to promote civic betterment, philanthropic endeavors, and general culture. The Wilfandel Club is the oldest African-American women's club in Los Angeles. Club meetings are still held at the beautiful Wilfandel Club House on 3425 West Adams Blvd in Los Angeles. Della Williams survived her famous husband by 16 years, living to the age of 100; she died on July 24, 1996. Her funeral was held at Founder's Church of Religious Science, designed by her husband. She was interred in the Williams crypt Inglewood Park Cemetery, Inglewood.

On October 29, 2015, a monument and memorial plaza to Paul Williams was dedicated just to the north of the Golden State Mutual Life Insurance Building as part of its recent renovation. The monument, made by artist Georgia Toliver features a 9-foot-tall bas relief of Paul Williams with many of his significant works. The bas relief is flanked with interpretive panels with a biography of Mr. Williams as well as a history of the Golden State Mutual Life Insurance Company.

== Quotes ==
"If I allow the fact that I am a Negro to checkmate my will to do, now, I will inevitably form the habit of being defeated."

"Planning is thinking beforehand how something is to be made or done, and mixing imagination with the product – which in a broad sense makes all of us planners. The only difference is that some people get a license to get paid for thinking and the rest of us just contribute our good thoughts to our fellow man."

"Without having the wish to 'show them,' I developed a fierce desire to 'show myself,'" Williams wrote in his 1937 essay entitled "I am a Negro" for The American Magazine. "I wanted to vindicate every ability I had. I wanted to acquire new abilities. I wanted to prove that I, as an individual, deserved a place in the world."

"Expensive homes are my business and social housing is my hobby."

"Being a Californian was to my advantage. In California the people are interested in ideas that are new and fresh without the traditional or historical ties that are ordinarily more associated with East Coast thinking."

== Legacy ==
- Williams is featured on the documentary series Profiles of African-American Success.
- In coordination with the Hollywood Studio District Neighborhood Council and Paul Williams Place Committee an effort is being made to rename the historic North Saint Andrews Place in Los Angeles after this icon in architecture.
- Hollywood Style is a book by Karen Hudson (Williams's granddaughter) about his houses.
- The 99% Invisible podcast "The Architect of Hollywood" looks into Williams' life and influence.
- The documentary Hollywood's Architect: The Paul R. Williams Story aired on PBS in February 2020.
- A collection of 280 photographs was published in 2020 by Janna Ireland featuring Williams' work, called Regarding Paul R. Williams: A Photographer's View.
