= Goldschmidt House =

Historic house in California, United States

- U.S. National Register of Historic Places
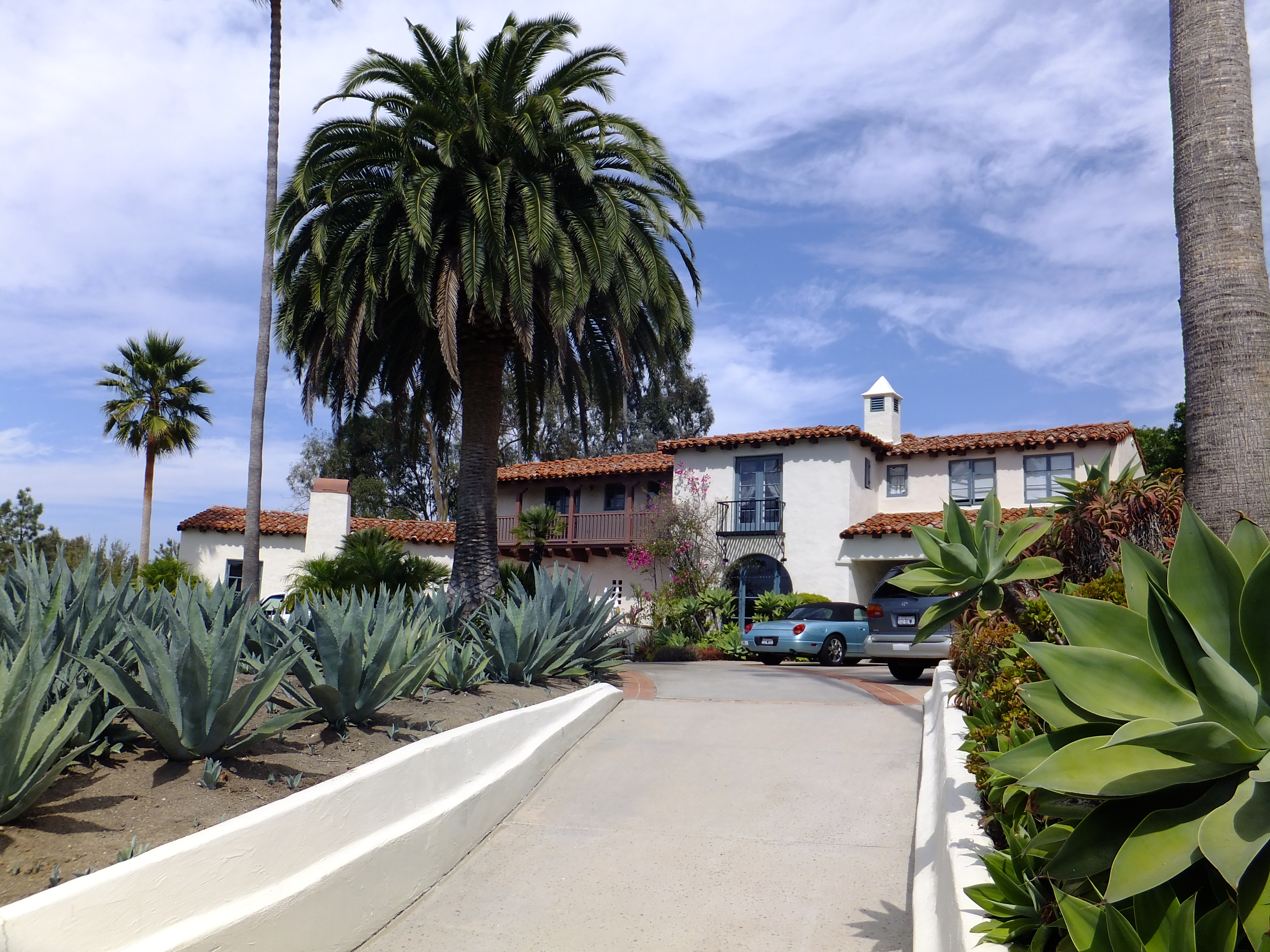

- Location within California Location within the United States
- Location: 243 Avenida La Cuesta, San Clemente, California
- Coordinates: 33.43397°N 117.61128°W
- Area: 0.7 acres (0.28 ha)
- Built: 1928; 1961
- Architect: Paul R. Williams
- Architectural style: Spanish Colonial Revival
- NRHP reference No.: 04001136
- Added to NRHP: October 14, 2004

The Goldschmidt House, also known as Casa Tres Vistas, is located at 243 Avenida La Cuesta in San Clemente, California. It was designed in Spanish Colonial Revival style by architect Paul R. Williams and built in 1928. It was listed on the National Register of Historic Places in 2004.

The Goldschmidts owned an alcohol business before Prohibition and previously owned the former Rancho Boca de la Playa, which Ole Hanson developed into San Clemente. The Goldschmidts purchased back the parcel on which this house was built.

== Architecture ==
The Goldschmidt House is considered "a significant example of Paul R. Williams' residential work, and shows Williams's mastery of the second or 'Mediterranean' phase of Spanish Colonial Revival architecture."

A two-room extension was added in 1961.

== See also ==
- National Register of Historic Places listings in Orange County, California
