= Capistrano Beach, Dana Point, California =

Capistrano Beach
- District of Dana Point
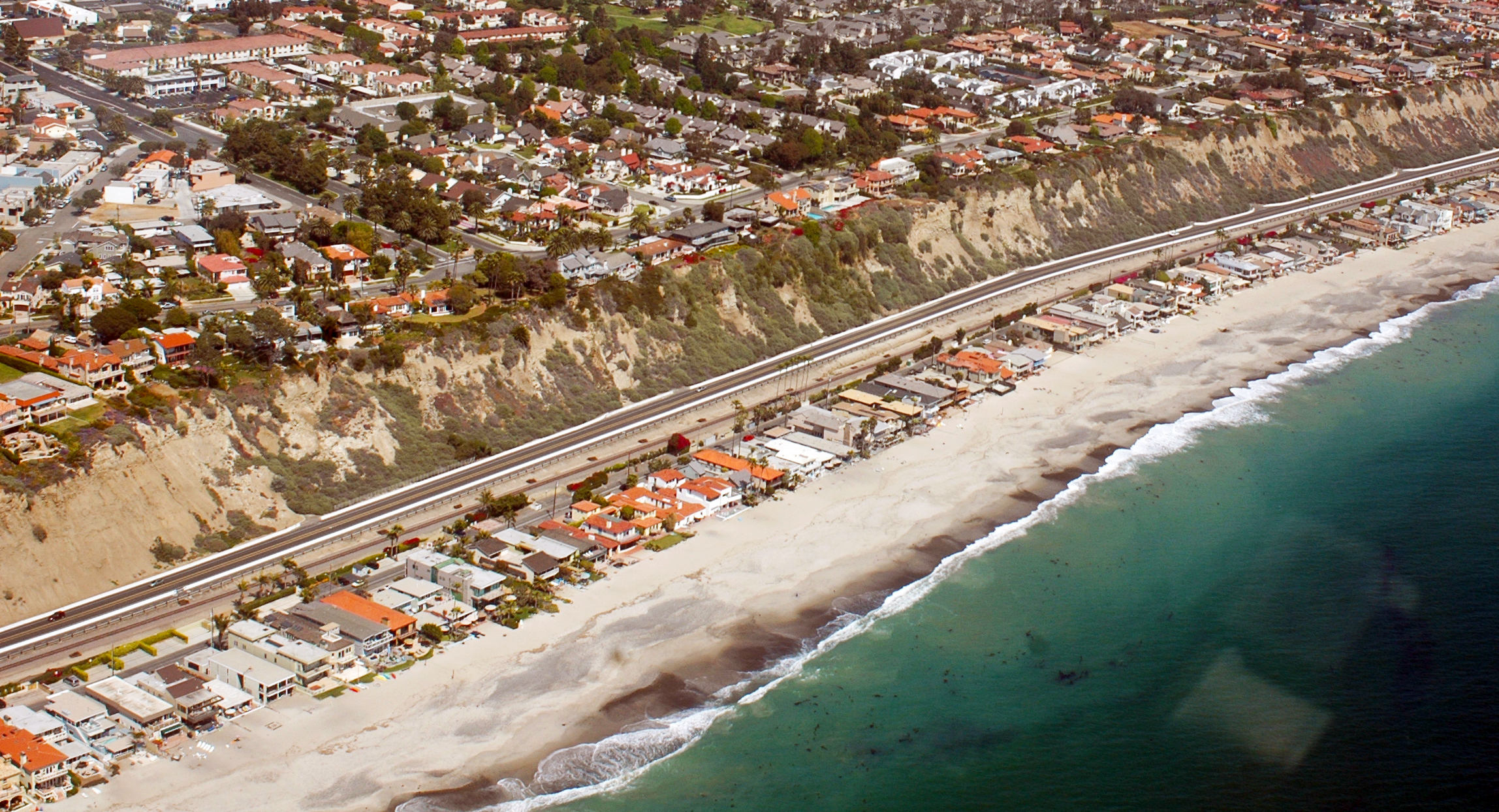
- Capistrano Beach
- Interactive map of Capistrano Beach
- Coordinates: 33°27′45″N 117°40′18″W
- Country: United States
- State: California
- County: Orange
- City: Dana Point
- Elevation: 51 ft (16 m)
- Time zone: UTC-8 (PST)
  - Summer (DST): UTC-7 (PDT)
- ZIP code: 92624
- Area code: 949

Capistrano Beach or Capo Beach is a coastal neighborhood in the city of Dana Point in Orange County, California. It is bordered by San Clemente to the south and Doheny State Beach to the north.

Capistrano Beach is situated along the coast on the southern end of Dana Point. Some homes are situated atop a cliff overlooking Coast Highway and Capistrano Beach Park. Several celebrities live in the town area, notably on Beach Road, where Hobie Alter conceived of the popular Hobie Cat catamaran.

== History ==
Rancho Boca de la Playa, granted to Don Emigdio Vejar, was the initial land title issued in the area now known as Capistrano Beach. The land was sold to Juan Abila in 1860, and then purchased by Marcus A Forster in 1886. Forster sold a strip of the land to the San Bernardino and San Diego Railway. The railway, in collaboration with the California Central Railway, built a rail line between Los Angeles and San Diego, with a station at Capistrano. The station was initially named San Juan by the Sea, but in 1910 was changed to Serra, the name of the newly formed school district.

Development of Capistrano Beach started in 1925 with residential homes on the bluff. The Capistrano Beach Club was built along the shore of the new development. In 1929, the Petroleum Securities Company (owned by Edward L. Doheny) became the new owners of the Capistrano Beach development. In 1931, following the death of Doheny's son, he donated over 40 acres (16 ha) to the state for Doheny State Beach. Capistrano Beach became part of the city of Dana Point in 1989.

During the excavation of the land during development in 1929, the bones of a mastodon (or possibly a mammoth) were discovered. The bones were taken to the Los Angeles Natural History Hall for display.

The 1,180 feet (360 m) wooden pier was popular for strolling, sightseeing, and fishing. The pier was severely damaged by waves in 1964, after which it was condemned and demolished in 1965. The Capistrano Beach Club became rundown and, in the late 1960s, was dismantled.

During storms in 2018, a boardwalk collapsed and an outdoor basketball court was severely damaged after being undermined by erosion caused by the waves. The storm exposed old cars put there decades prior as part of a now corroded sea wall. More boulders were placed to protect the basketball court that was damaged.

The Serra Siding project is proposed along the shoreline that would build 1.2 miles (1.9 km) of additional siding track. The project would create additional train capacity along this busy corridor.

== Gallery ==
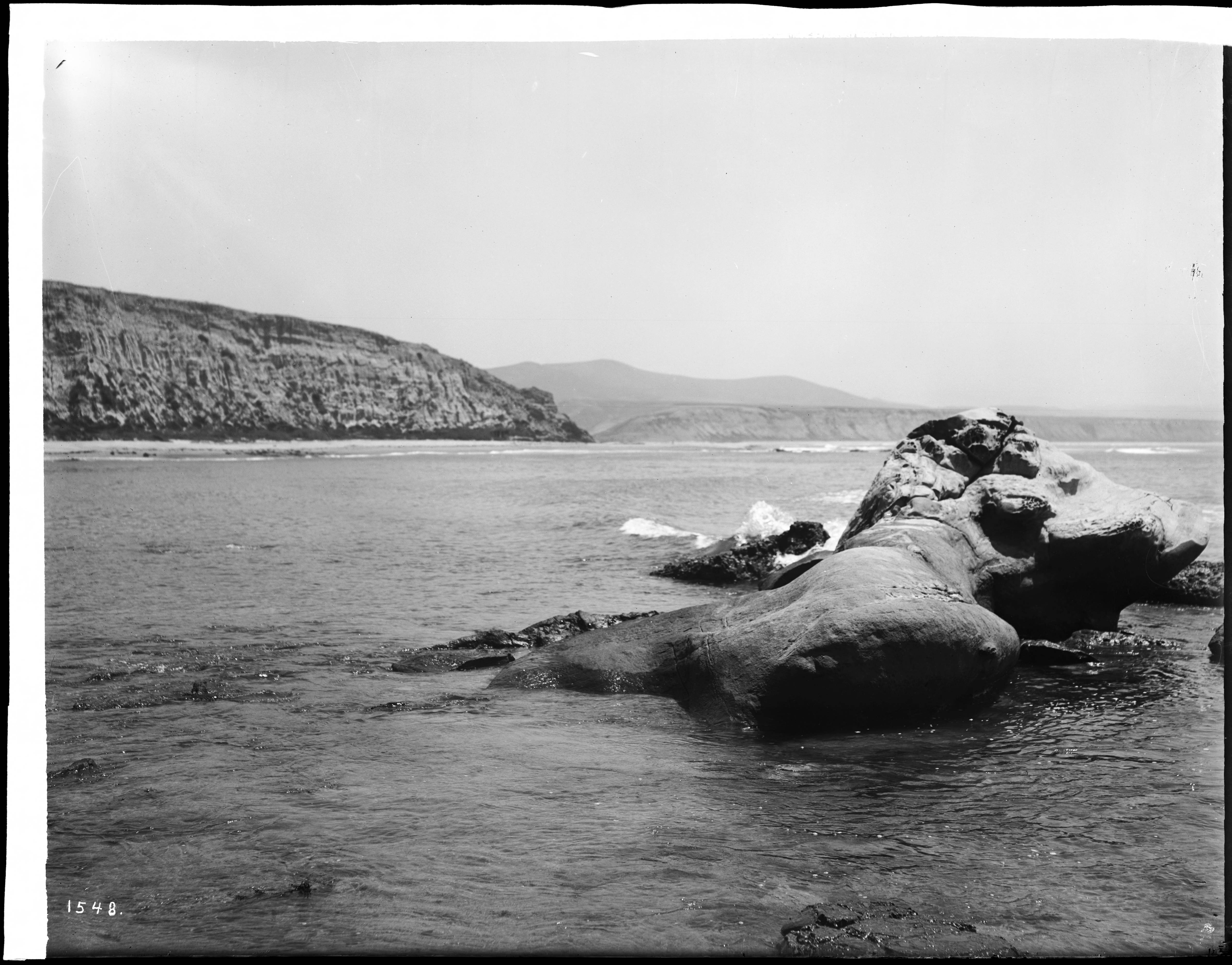
Capistrano Beach from the sea, c. 1900

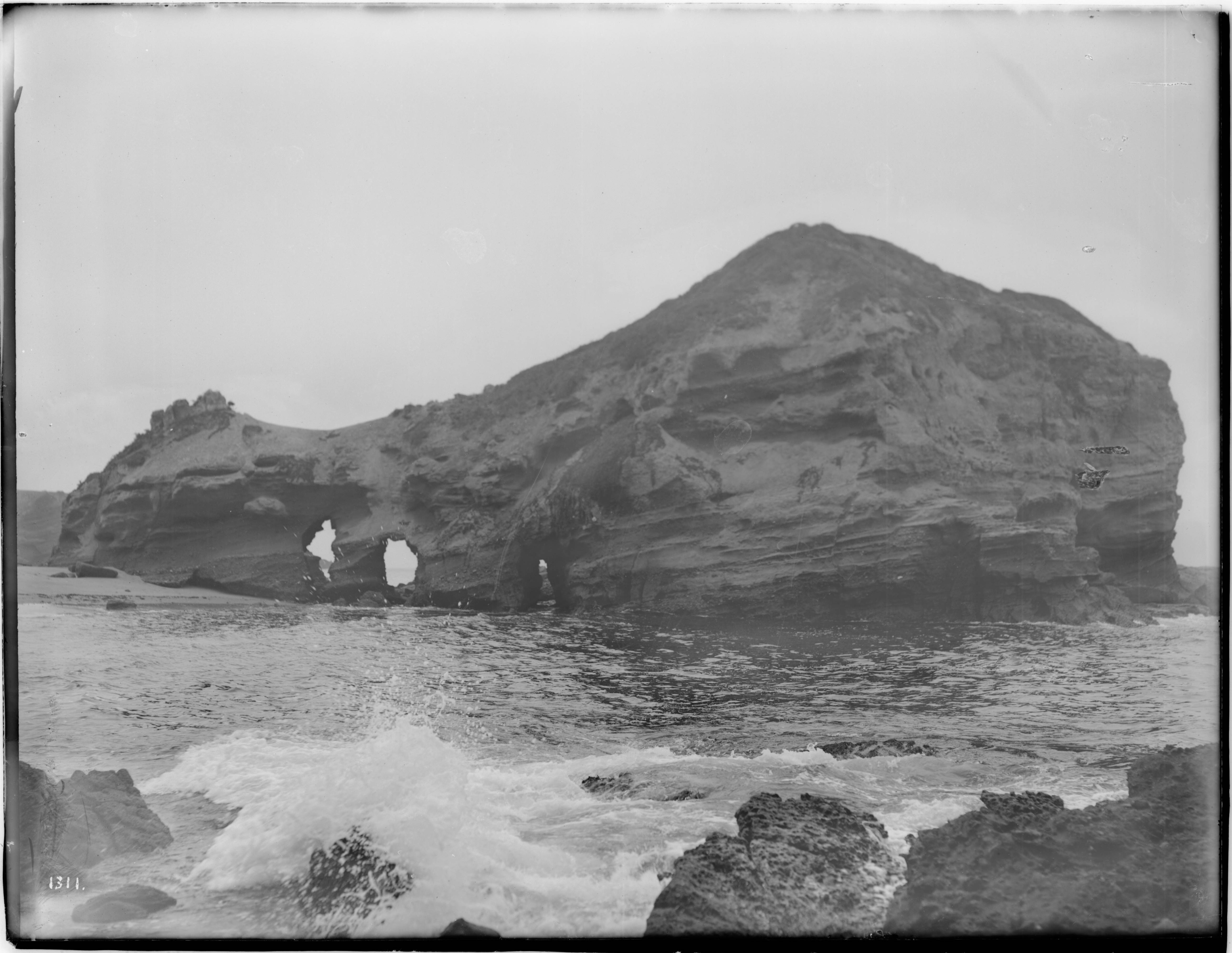
Rock arches at Capistrano Beach in 1910

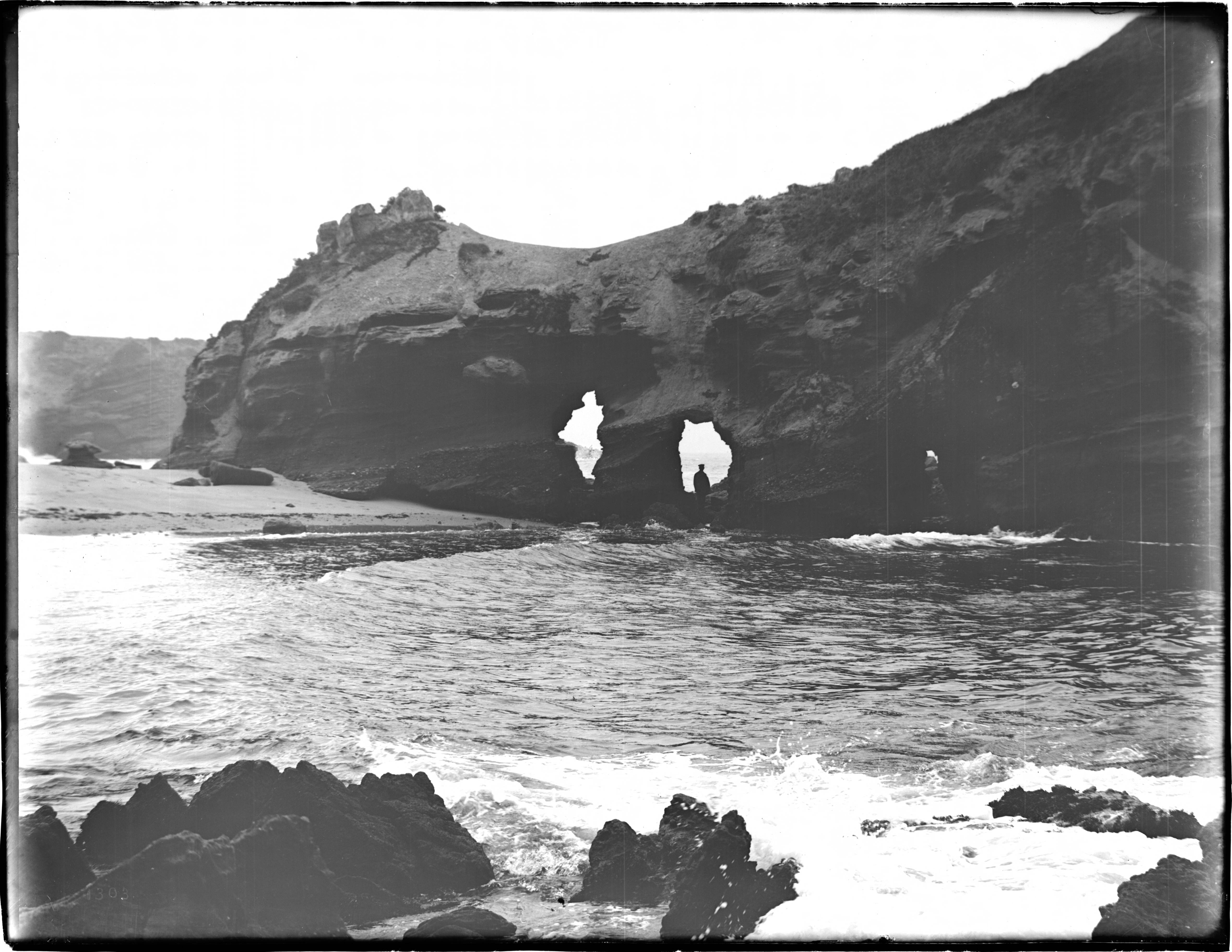
Rock arches at Capistrano Beach in 1910

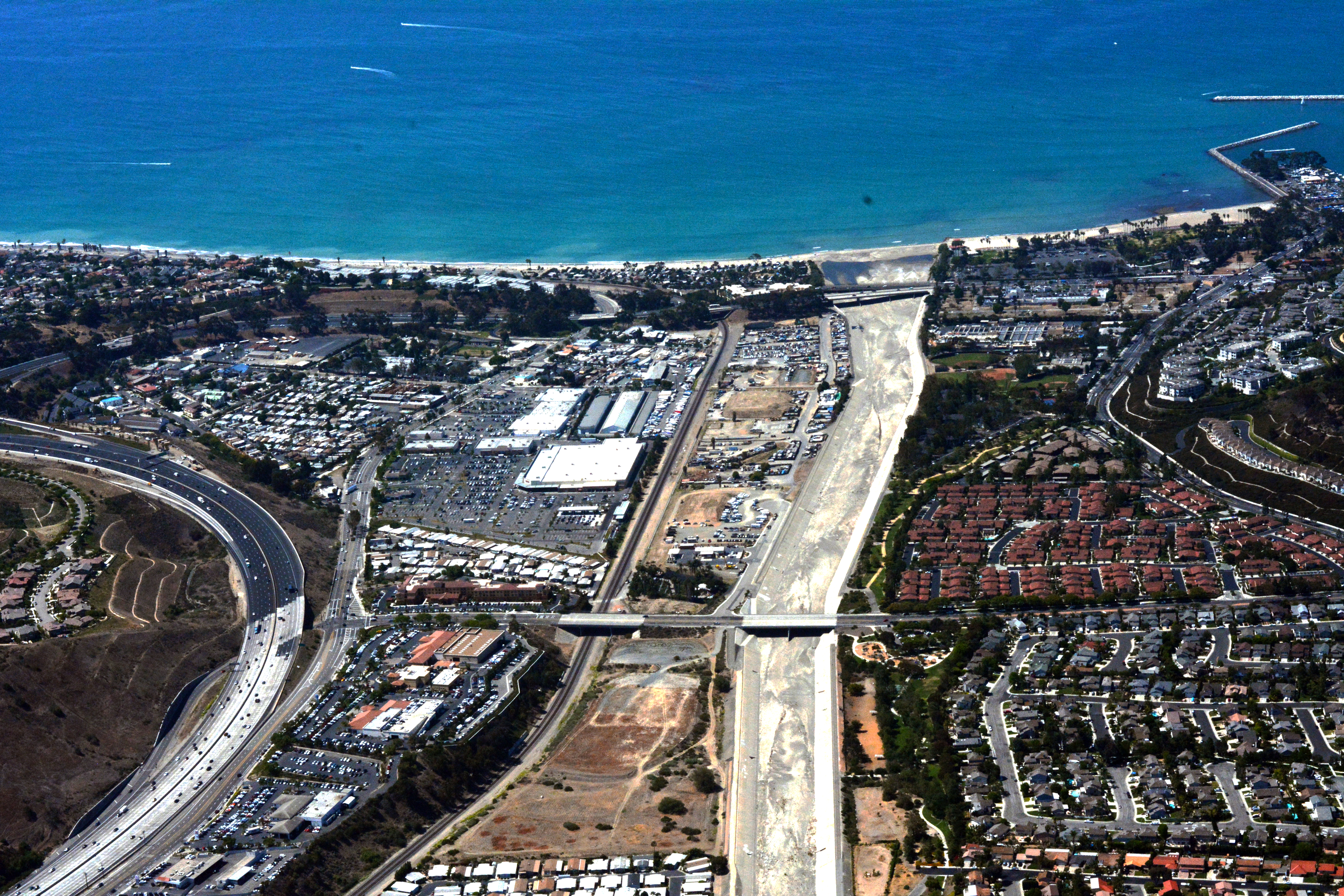
The San Juan Creek's southwestern mouth at Capistrano Beach

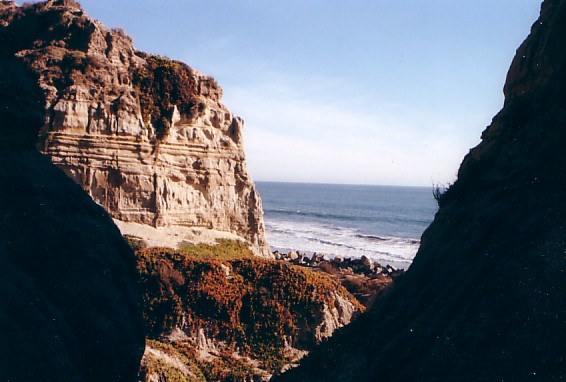
Capistrano Beach sea bluffs in 2005

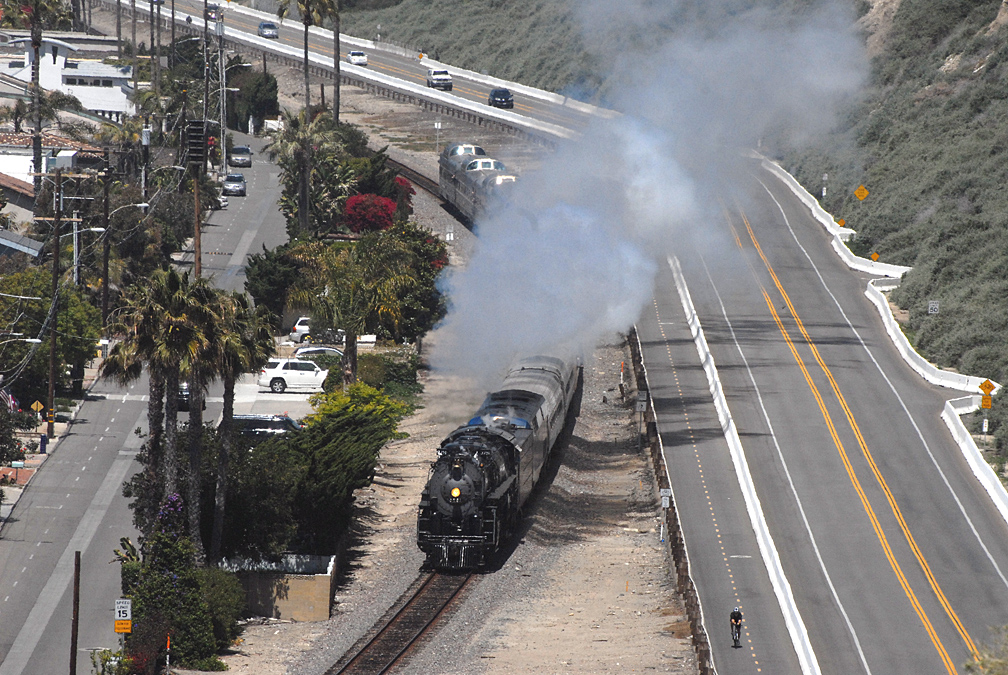
Santa Fe 3751 in Capistrano Beach in May 2010

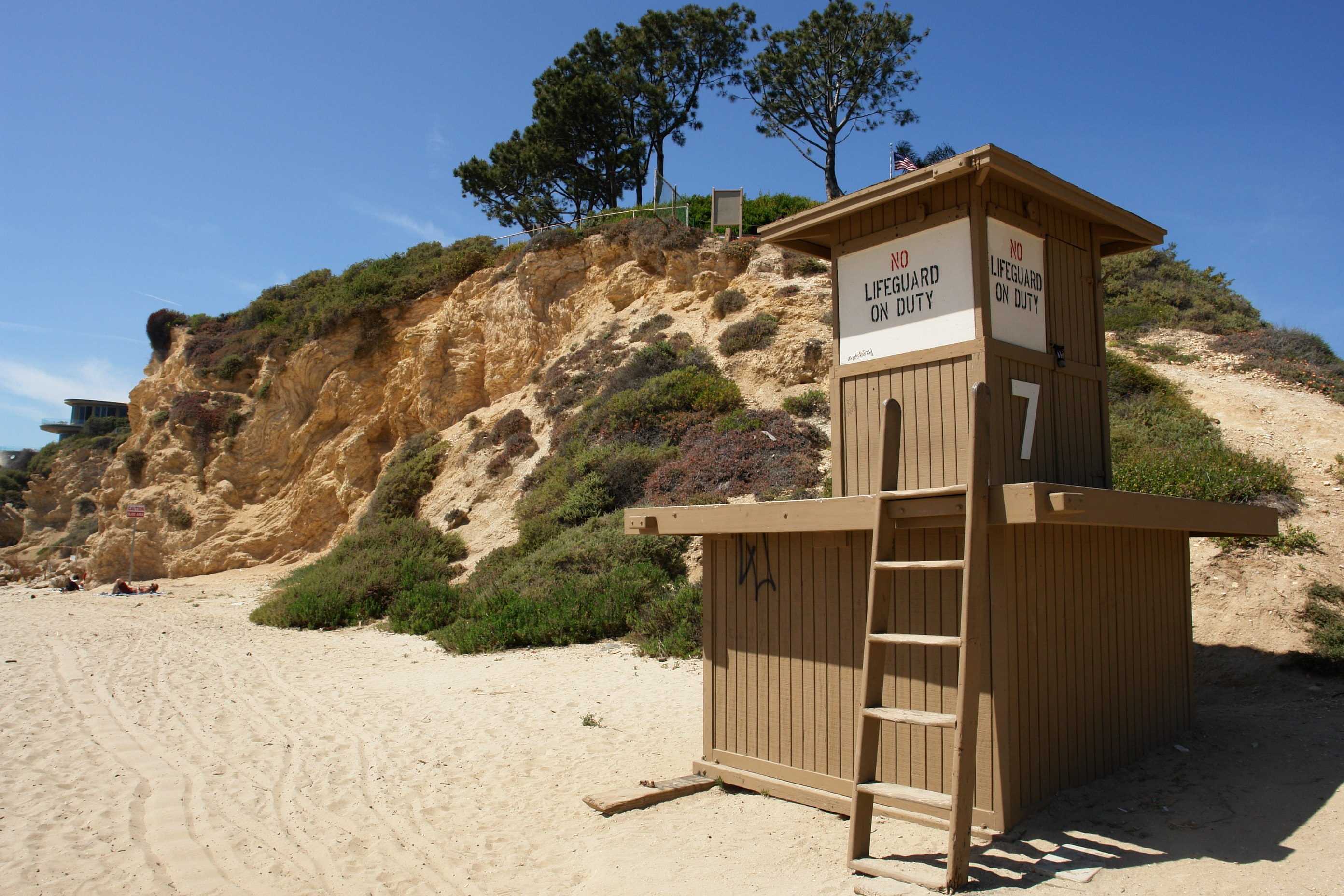
A lifeguard stand at Capistrano Beach

== See also ==
- List of beaches in California
- List of California state parks
