= Constance Stuart Larrabee =

English photographer

- Born: Constance Stuart; 7 August 1914; Cornwall, England
- Died: 27 July 2000 (aged 85); Chestertown, Maryland

Constance Stuart Larrabee (7 August 1914 – 27 July 2000) was an English photographer best known for her images of South Africa and her photo-journalism on Europe during World War II. She was South Africa's first female war correspondent.

== Early life ==
Constance Stuart was born on 7 August 1914, in Cornwall, England, and moved to Cape Town, South Africa with her parents when she was three months old. She lived on a tin mine in the northern Transvaal, where her father was a mining engineer.

Her family moved to Pretoria in 1920, where she spent the majority of her childhood. Stuart's interest in photography began in 1924 when she was given a Kodak Box Brownie for her 10th birthday. In 1930 she exhibited eight photographs taken with her first camera during Boys and Girls Achievement Week at the Pretoria Agricultural Society Show, and won first place in Photography.

Stuart returned to England in 1933 to study at the Regent Street Polytechnic School of Photography, London. During her time there she was an apprentice at two professional portrait studios under Yevonde Middleton, a society photographer based in Berkley Square, and Yvonne, a professional theatrical photographer based in Soho. Stuart moved to Munich in 1935 to continue her studies at the Bavarian State Institute for Photography. It was during her education in Munich that she was introduced to the Rolleiflex camera, which she used throughout her career. She also shed her romantic pictorial style in favour of a straight, un-manipulated approach to black and white photography.

== Career ==
On her return to South Africa in 1936 she established the Constance Stuart Portrait Studio in Pretoria. She became a renowned portraitist, and photographed many of the leading statesmen, generals, artists, writers, society and theatrical personalities of that period. In 1946 she opened a second studio in Johannesburg.

Between 1937 and 1949 Stuart developed her lifelong interest in recording and exhibiting the vanishing ethnic cultures of South Africa: the Ndebele, Bushmen, Lobedu, Zulu, Swazi, Sotho and Transkei peoples. Some of them she took during the visit of the British Royals to South Africa in 1947. Stuart was the official photographer of the royal tour, and while traveling throughout Basutoland (Lesotho), Swaziland and Bechuanaland (Botswana), which were at the time the three British protectorates in South Africa. She photographed tribal people dressed up for the occasion in their native costumes. She exhibited these photographs, and many like them in Preotria, Johannesburg and Cape Town, which led to her appointment as South Africa's first woman war correspondent for Libertas magazine. Between 1945 and 1955 she served in Egypt, Italy, France and England, attached to the American 7th Army and the South African 6th Division in the Italian Apennines. Although she had only been hired to photograph the South African troops in the army, Stuart went well beyond her assignment. She photographed the American, French, British and Canadian troops as well as her South African countrymen. She also photographed the civilians the soldiers met on the way to Germany, and she photographed the devastated villages, towns and cities in their path. As a female war correspondent Stuart was often held back from the front for days, and as she was billeted separately from her male co-workers the facilities available to her were often uncomfortable. She took all the difficulties in stride, accepting them as part of the war, and quickly gained the respect of the people around her. One co-worker wrote: 'Constance Stuart... has made a fine art of getting around the fronts. She has seen more of war than any other woman I have met.'

Although she was not permitted to keep a diary on the front, she compiled her photographic notes and letters into a memoir named Jeep Trek, published in 1946.

When she returned to South Africa in 1945 she travelled throughout the country exhibiting many of these photographs, as well as her depictions of South African tribal people. In 1948, the National Party came to power in South Africa and instituted a policy of strict racial segregation. The following year, Stuart left South Africa for America.

== Later years ==
While Stuart was living in New York she resumed her acquaintance with an old friend, Sterling Larrabee, whom she had met during the war when he was the U.S. military attache to South Africa. She and Larrabee married in 1949 and moved to Chestertown, Maryland, where she spent much of her time raising prize-winning Norwich terriers. The couple also spent time on Tangier Island, whose people and places Larrabee began photographing in 1951.

While living in Chestertown she established a long association with Washington College. She supported its arts programs, was Chairwoman of the Washington College Friends of the Arts 1983–1984, and helped establish the Constance Stuart Larrabee Arts Center.

Her husband died in 1975. Constance Stuart Larrabee died on 27 July 2000 at her home in Chestertown, aged 85.

== Selected exhibitions ==
- 1944 – The Malay Quarter. Opened by Noël Coward in Pretoria.
- 1945 – A Tribute: South African 6th Division and the United States 7th Army. Travelled throughout South Africa.
- 1953 – Tribal Women of South Africa. The American Museum of Natural History in New York.
- 1955 – Group exhibition: her photograph of a young African girl painting her face is included by Edward Steichen in The Family of Man. Museum of Modern Art in New York.
- 1979 – Photographs by Constance Stuart Larrabee, A Retrospective. The South African National Gallery, Cape Town.
- 1982 – Celebration on the Chesapeake. Washington College in Chestertown, Maryland.
- 1984 – Tribal Photographs. Corcoran Gallery of Art in Washington, DC, and the Santa Fe Centre for Photography in New Mexico.
- 1985 – Group exhibition: The Indelible Image: Photographs of War 1846 to the Present. The Corcoran Gallery of Art, Washington DC. Travelled to The Grey Art Gallery, New York University, New York and The Rice Museum, Houston, Texas.
- 1986 – Group exhibition: Bon Voyage. The Cooper-Hewitt Museum of the Smithsonian Institution, New York.
- 1988 – African Profile. Bayly Art Museum of the University of Virginia.
- 1989 – Constance Stuart Larrabee: WWII Photo Journal. The National Museum of Women in the Arts in Washington, DC.
- 1993 – Chesapeake Bay Reflections. The Chesapeake Bay Maritime Museum in St. Michaels, Maryland.
- 1993 – Witness to a World at War. The Defence Intelligence Agency, Bolling Air Force Base in Washington, DC.
- 1993 – Group exhibition: Great Women in Photography. The Kathleen Ewing Gallery in Washington, DC.
