= Sharon Patton =

American historian (born 1944)

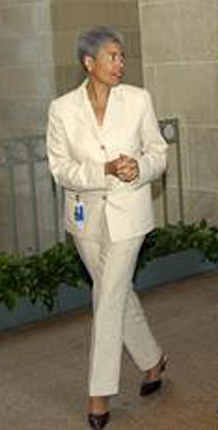
- Born: 1944 (age 81–82)
- Education: Roosevelt University; Northwestern University; University of Illinois
- Scientific career
- Fields: History
- Workplaces: Mankato State College; Lake Forest College; Virginia Commonwealth University; University of Houston; University of Maryland; Monclair State College; Studio Museum in Harlem; University of Michigan; Allen Memorial Art Museum; Oberlin College; National Museum of African Art

Sharon F. Patton (born 1944) is an American historian who specializes in African art.

== Early life and education ==
She was born in southern part of Chicago in 1944, where she received her bachelor's degree in 1966 from Roosevelt University. Patton attended University of Illinois in Champaign-Urbana where she got her master's degree three years later. The same year, she became a student at the University of Chicago and by 1980, obtained her Ph.D. in the history of African art at the Northwestern University.

== Career ==
In 1968, Patton began her career as an instructor for the art department at Mankato State College in Minnesota where she taught African-American art. From 1971 to 1972, she was one of the faculties at the Lake Forest College and from 1972 to 1973, served at the Virginia Commonwealth University. In 1976, she worked at the University of Houston and from 1979 to 1985, she was a professor at the University of Maryland, which in the end, led her to become the art director at Montclair State University of New Jersey by 1986.

In 1987, she became a curator-in-chief of the Studio Museum in Harlem, New York. In 1991, she relocated to the University of Michigan where she worked as an associate professor. In 1998, Patton was named an art director of the Allen Memorial Art Museum which was a department of Oberlin College. In 2003, she relocated again, this time to Washington, D.C. where she worked as a director of the National Museum of African Art, a department of Smithsonian Institution until 2008.

During her life, she held 20 exhibitions, three of which were in the Studio Museum.

== Publications ==
Her first book Memory and Metaphor: The Art of Romare Bearden won the Choice’s Outstanding Academic Book of the Year Award. She is also an author of 1983 published Traditional Forms and Modern Africa: West African Art at the University of Maryland, a 1987 Witches, Demons and Metamorphoses, and 1990s Vincent C. Smith, Reding on a Blue Note.
