= Berkley Square =

Historic house in Nevada, United States

- U.S. National Register of Historic Places
- U.S. Historic district
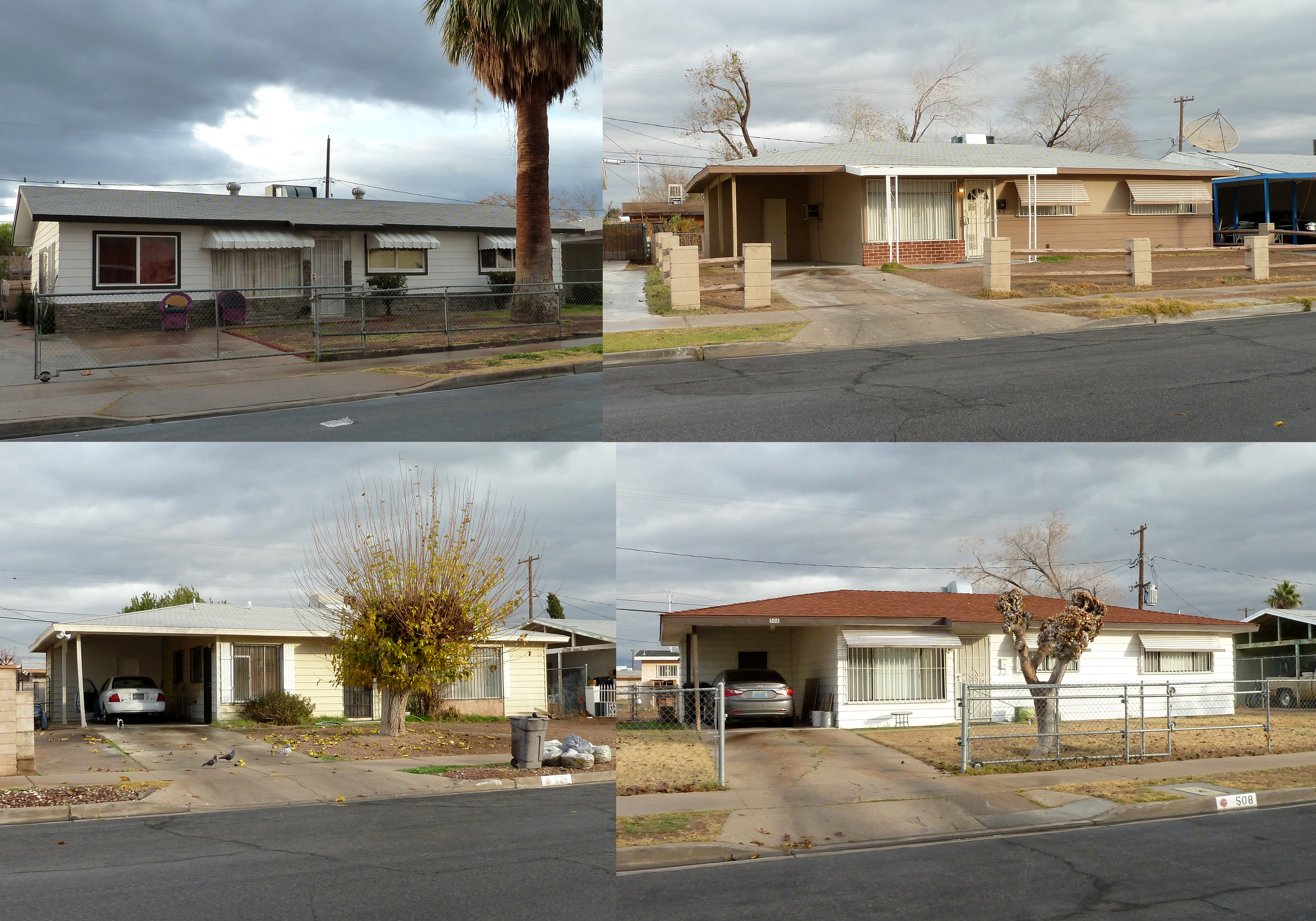
- Several homes from the Berkley Square development.

- Location within Nevada Location within the United States
- Location: bounded by Byrnes Ave., D St., Leonard Ave., and G St. Las Vegas, Nevada
- Coordinates: 36°11′26.09″N 115°8′57.05″W
- Built: 1954-1955
- Architect: Paul Revere Williams
- Architectural style: Contemporary ranch
- NRHP reference No.: 09000846
- Added to NRHP: October 23, 2009

Berkley Square is a historic district in the West Las Vegas area of Las Vegas, Nevada. It was designed in 1949 by Paul Revere Williams and is named after Thomas L. Berkley, an attorney from Oakland, California. The historic district contained 148 homes. The district was listed on the National Register of Historic Places in 2009.

== Description ==
Berkley Square was designed by Paul R. Williams from Los Angeles, considered a prominent African-American architect at the time. The district is also the first Black-owned subdivision in the United States. The Berkley Square Historic District is situated around one and one-half country miles from Las Vegas close to Owens Avenue] and D Street, and is bound by Byrnes and Leonard avenues on the north and south, sequentially, and G and D Streets on the west and east, sequentially.

The Historic District includes 148 houses built between 1954 and 1955 in the Contemporary Ranch style with 2 models which contrasted by roof type, veranda protuberance and façade home stretches and fenestration. The quarter was arranged according to Federal Housing Administration standards of the day, demonstrating concern for traffic and pedestrian safety with limited access points and sidewalks disunited from the streets by a lawn strip.

== History and Context ==
The African American occupants in Las Vegas had increased from 150 in the 1930s to over 3,000 when World War II ended. The requirement of high-grade sheltering became a major socio-political issue for the black community bound by law and custom to the segregated Westside. Around 16,000 people, most of whom were African Americans, lived in the 160-acre Westside area of Las Vegas by 1955.

The District helped to develop the living conditions for the town's African-American inhabitants. In the late 1940s and 50s, local activism demonstrated the advancements which were being made in the community. Berkley Square also illustrated the massive structure smash which happened in Las Vegas and all over the country in the post-war period and reserves good integrity as a domestic exurb of that time.
