= Stripweave =

Textile technique popular in West Africa

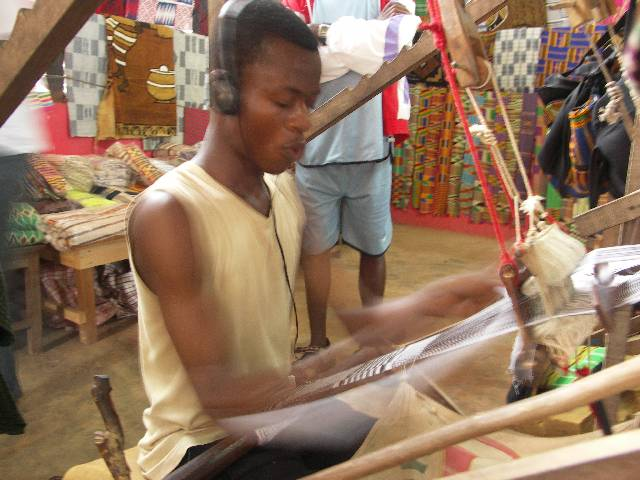
Production of kente cloth, a type of stripweave, on a narrow double heddle loom.

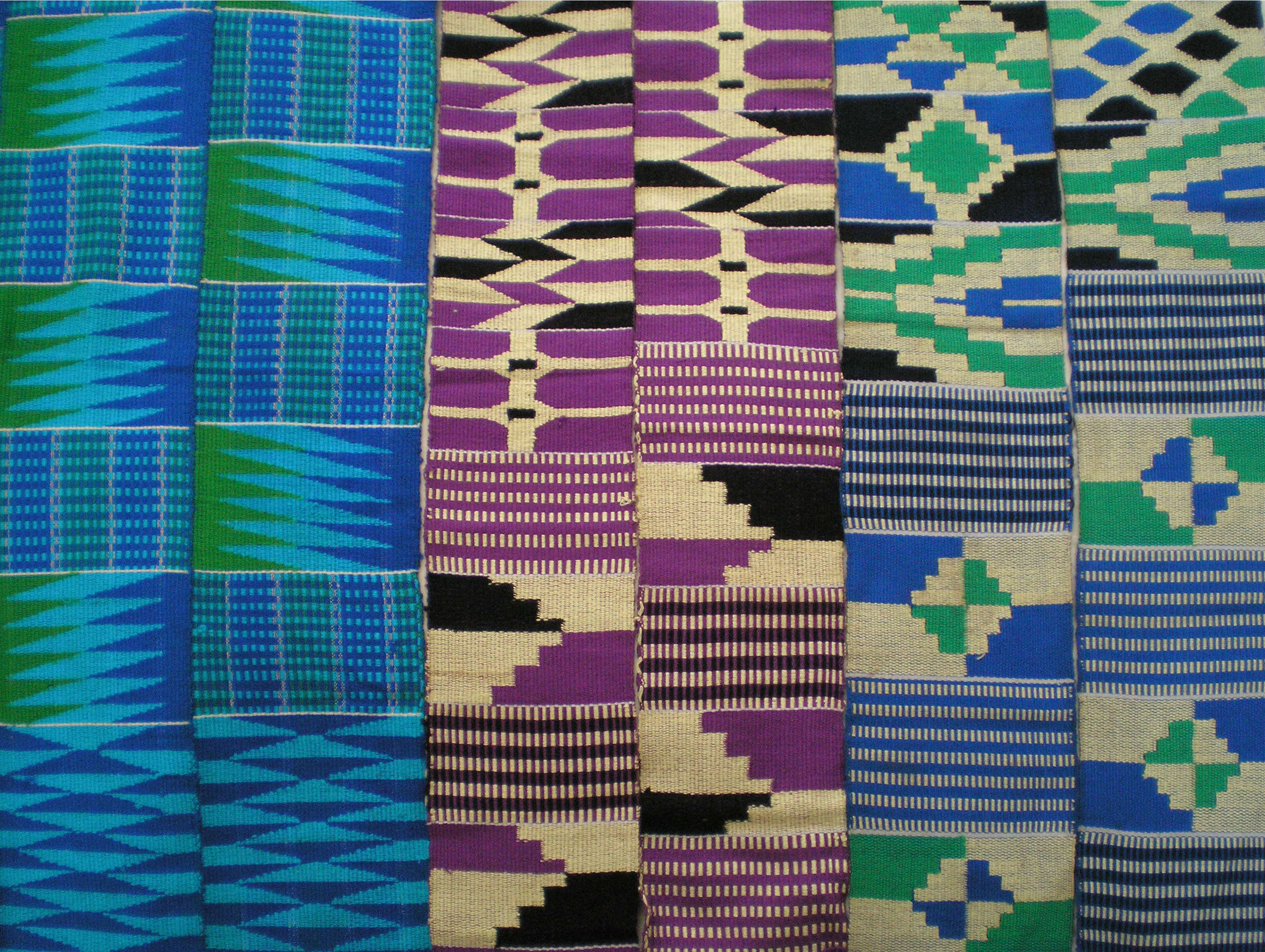
An Ewe stripweave from Ghana.

Stripweave is a textile technique in which large numbers of thin strips of cloth are sewn together to produce a finished fabric. Most stripweave is produced in West Africa from handwoven fabric, of which the example best known internationally is the kente cloth of Ghana.

The earliest evidence of this traditional technique dates to the eleventh century among the Tellem people of Mali.

== Materials ==
Cotton, silk, and rayon are the usual fibers for stripweave garment production. Traditionally these were hand spun, although machine spun synthetics are coming into increasing use. Wool is also in use for stripweave blankets by the Fulani people in Mali.
