= San Diego wildfires =

The term San Diego fires or San Diego wildfires may refer to:

- Cedar Fire (2003)
- 2005 Labor Day brush fire
- October 2007 California wildfires, which includes the Witch Creek Fire and the Harris Fire
- Witch Fire
- Harris Fire
- May 2014 San Diego County wildfires
- May 2016 4S Ranch brush fire
- San Diego Wildfire - former American Basketball Association team
