= Witch Creek =

May mean:

== Places ==
- Witch Creek Fire, the second-largest wildfire of the 2007 California wildfire season
- Witch Creek (San Diego County), a tributary of Santa Ysabel Creek, in California

== Other uses ==
- Witch Creek Road, a horror/drama/dark comedy webcomic/webtoon series
