= 2007 California wildfires =

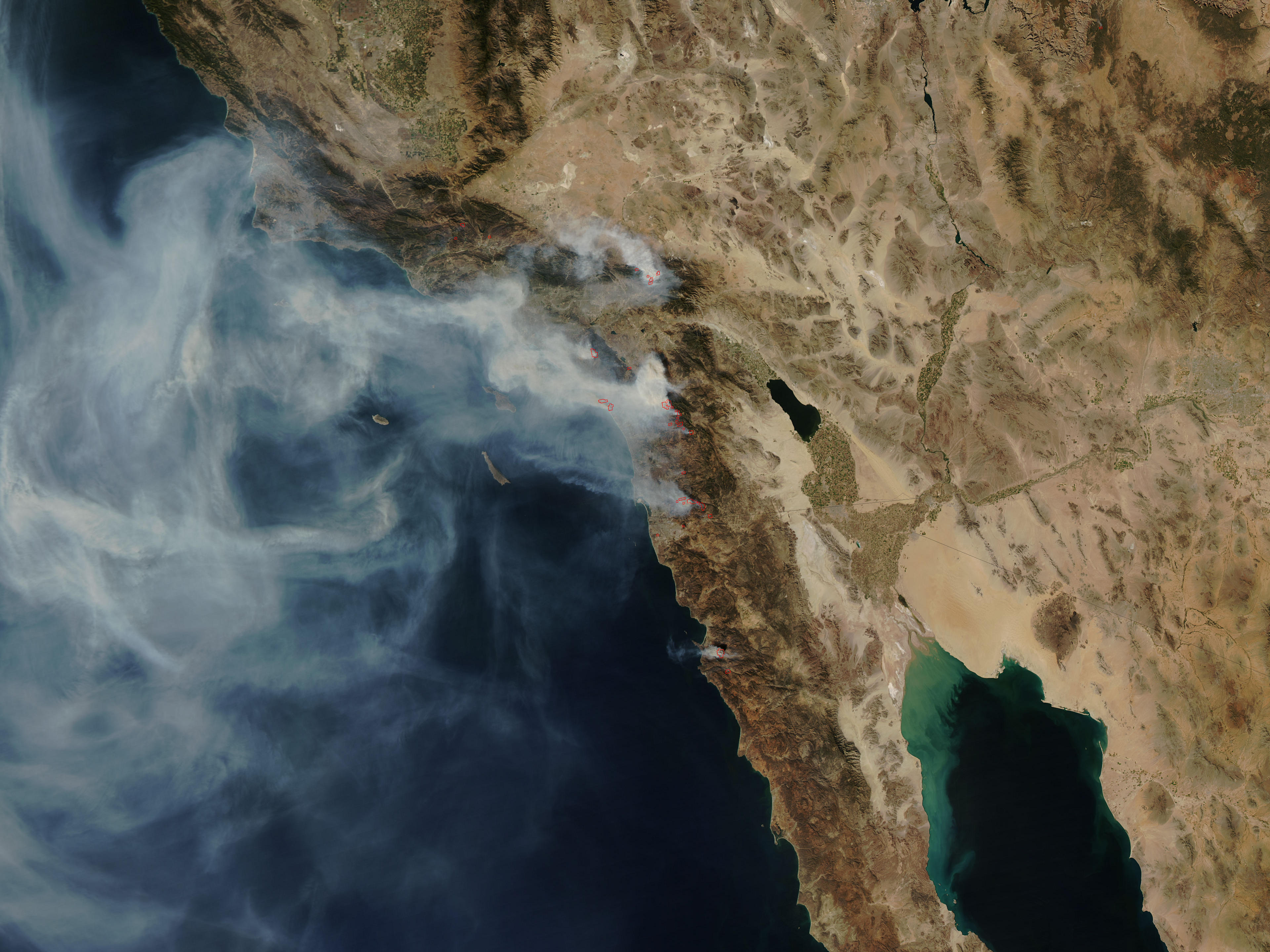
- NASA satellite photo (provided by NSPO, Taiwan National Space Organization) from October 24, 2007, showing the active fire zones and smoke plumes.

Statistics
- Total fires: 9,093
- Total area: 1,520,362 acres (6,152.69 km^{2})

Impacts
- Deaths: At least 17
- Injuries: At least 203
- Cost: >$2.681 billion (2007 USD)

At least 9,093 separate wildfires charred 1,520,362 acres (6,152.69 km^{2}) of land in the US state of California in 2007. Thirty of those wildfires were part of the Fall 2007 California firestorm, which burned approximately 972,147 acres (about 3,934 km^{2}, or 1,520 mi^{2}) of land from Santa Barbara County to the U.S.–Mexico border. At the peak of the wildfire activity in October 2007, the raging wildfires were visible from space.

The wildfires killed a total of 17 people, with nine of them dying directly from the fires; 203 others were injured, including at least 124 firefighters.

California Governor Arnold Schwarzenegger declared a state of emergency in seven California counties where fires were burning. President George W. Bush concurred, and ordered federal aid to supplement state and local response efforts. Over 6,000 firefighters worked to fight the blazes; they were aided by units of the United States Armed Forces, United States National Guard, almost 3,000 prisoners convicted of non-violent crimes, and 60 firefighters from the Mexican cities of Tijuana and Tecate. The fires forced approximately 1,000,000 people to evacuate from their homes, becoming the largest evacuation in California's history.

Major contributing factors to the extreme fire conditions were drought in Southern California, hot weather, and the unusually strong Santa Ana winds, with gusts reaching 112 mph (180 km/h). California's "fire season," which traditionally runs from June to October, has become a year-round threat, due to a mixture of perennial drought and the increasing number of homes built in canyons and on hillsides, surrounded by brush and forest.

The fires had numerous sources. Several were triggered by power lines damaged by the high winds. One fire started when a semi-truck overturned. Another was suspected as having been deliberately caused; the suspect was shot and killed in flight by state authorities. A 10-year-old boy admitted that he accidentally started the Buckweed Fire by playing with matches. The causes of the remaining fires remain under investigation. The last active fire of the October 2007 fires, the Harris Fire, was fully extinguished on November 16, 2007, about 27 days after the series of wildfires had begun to ignite. The October 2007 wildfires collectively caused over $2 billion in property damages.

During the season, the National Interagency Fire Center reported that two firefighters were killed. One died in a helicopter crash, and the second was killed in a bulldozer rollover.

== Background ==
The timing of "fire season" in California is variable, depending on the amount of prior winter and spring precipitation, the frequency and severity of weather such as heat waves and wind events, and moisture content in vegetation. Northern California typically sees wildfire activity between late spring and early fall, peaking in the summer with hotter and drier conditions. Occasional cold frontal passages can bring wind and lightning. The timing of fire season in Southern California is similar, peaking between late spring and fall. The severity and duration of peak activity in either part of the state is modulated in part by weather events: downslope/offshore wind events can lead to critical fire weather, while onshore flow and Pacific weather systems can bring conditions that hamper wildfire growth.

== List of wildfires ==
Below is a list of all fires that exceeded 1,000 acres (4.0 km^{2}) during the 2007 fire season. The list is taken from CAL FIRE's list of large fires.

Name	County	Acres	Km^{2}	Start date	Contained Date (Note: Containment means that fire crews have established and secured control lines around the fire's perimeter. These lines are artificial barriers, like trenches or cleared vegetation, designed to stop the fire's spread, or natural barriers like rivers. Containment reflects progress in managing the fire but does not necessarily mean the fire is starved of fuel, under control, or put out.)	Notes
241	Orange	2,036	8.2	March 11, 2007	March 13, 2007	2 structures destroyed
Sierra	Riverside	1,044	4.2	March 11, 2007	March 12, 2007	
Las Flores	San Bernardino	4,100	16.6	March 31, 2007	April 1, 2007	1 structure destroyed
Golden	Inyo	1,988	8.0	April 14, 2007	April 15, 2007	
James	Kern	1,350	5.5	April 29, 2007	May 5, 2007	
Island	Los Angeles	4,750	19.2	May 10, 2007	May 15, 2007	6 structures destroyed
Gorman	Los Angeles	2,050	8.3	May 19, 2007	May 22, 2007	
Shannon	Tulare	2,140	8.7	June 3, 2007	June 4, 2007	
Goldledge	Tulare	4,196	17.0	June 3, 2007	June 28, 2007	
Inkopah	Imperial	1,500	6.1	June 5, 2007	June 6, 2007	
Angora	El Dorado	3,100	12.5	June 24, 2007	July 2, 2007	309 structures destroyed; cost at least $152.7 million in property damage and fire suppression
White	Kern	12,454	50.4	June 24, 2007	July 3, 2007	31 structures destroyed
Mission	Monterey	2,300	9.3	June 28, 2007	June 28, 2007	
Zaca	Santa Barbara	240,207	972.1	July 4, 2007	September 4, 2007	1 structure destroyed
Antelope Complex	Plumas	22,902	92.7	July 5, 2007	July 13, 2007	2 structures destroyed
Inyo Complex	Inyo	35,176	142.4	July 6, 2007	July 16, 2007	33 structures destroyed
Rock 2	Tulare	1,005	4.1	July 6, 2007	July 7, 2007	
Fletcher	Modoc	8,121	32.9	July 10, 2007	July 19, 2007	11 structures destroyed
Elk Complex	Siskiyou	17,684	71.6	July 10, 2007	September 15, 2007	1 firefighter fatality
China-Back Complex	Siskiyou	2,906	11.8	July 13, 2007	July 21, 2007	
Bangor	Butte	1,057	4.3	August 7, 2007	August 7, 2007	
Tar	Kings	5,644	22.8	August 10, 2007	August 19, 2007	
Grouse	Tulare	1,022	4.1	August 27, 2007	September 8, 2007	
Wallow	Trinity	1,440	5.8	August 29, 2007	September 3, 2007	
North	Los Angeles	2,200	8.9	September 2, 2007	September 8, 2007	
Lick	Santa Clara	47,760	193.3	September 3, 2007	September 11, 2007	24 structures destroyed
Moonlight	Plumas	64,997	263.0	September 3, 2007	September 15, 2007	21 structures destroyed
Pine	San Diego	2,170	8.8	September 12, 2007	September 16, 2007	
Butler 2	San Bernardino	14,039	56.8	September 14, 2007	October 1, 2007	3 structures destroyed
Ranch	Los Angeles	58,401	236.3	October 20, 2007	October 30, 2007	10 structures destroyed
Canyon	Los Angeles	4,521	18.3	October 21, 2007	October 27, 2007	8 structures destroyed
Sedgewick Fire	Santa Barbara	710	2.9	October 21, 2007	October 30, 2007	
Harris	San Diego	90,440	366.0	October 21, 2007	November 5, 2007	472 structures destroyed, 1 civilian fatality
Witch	San Diego	197,990	801.2	October 21, 2007	November 6, 2007	1,650 structures destroyed, 2 civilian fatalities
McCoy Fire (Note: These wildfires merged into the Witch Fire.)	San Diego	400	1.6	October 21, 2007	October 26, 2007	1 structure destroyed
Buckweed	Los Angeles	38,356	155.2	October 21, 2007	November 1, 2007	63 structures destroyed
Santiago	Orange	28,400	114.9	October 21, 2007	November 9, 2007	24 structures destroyed
Little Mountain Fire	San Bernardino	650	2.6	October 22, 2007	October 24, 2007	
Magic	Los Angeles	2,824	11.4	October 22, 2007	October 27, 2007	
Slide	San Bernardino	12,759	51.6	October 22, 2007	October 31, 2007	272 structures destroyed
Rice	San Diego	9,472	38.3	October 22, 2007	November 1, 2007	248 structures destroyed
Grass Valley	San Bernardino	1,247	5.0	October 22, 2007	October 29, 2007	178 structures destroyed
Meadowridge Fire	Los Angeles	58,401	236.3	October 23, 2007	October 30, 2007	
Poomacha	San Diego	49,410	200.0	October 23, 2007	November 13, 2007	217 structures destroyed
Ammo (Horno) Fire	San Diego	21,004	85.0	October 23, 2007	October 29, 2007	
Jack	Mariposa	1,108	4.5	October 29, 2007	December 15, 2007	
Corral	Los Angeles	4,901	19.8	November 24, 2007	November 27, 2007	86 structures destroyed

== Wind and weather ==
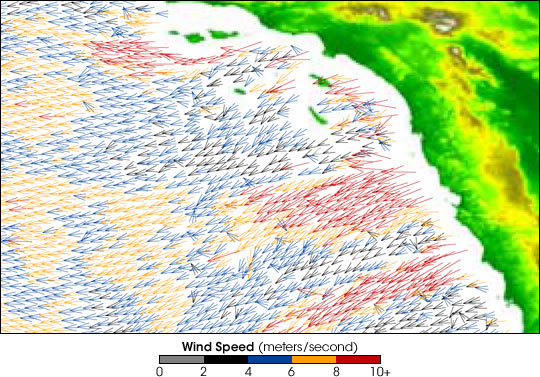
QuikSCAT image from 2002 showing the speed of the Santa Ana winds (m/s)

The October 2007 fires occurred following an extremely dry previous winter: in Los Angeles, with only 3.21 inches or 81.5 millimetres of rainfall between July 2006 and June 2007, it was the driest “rain year” on record by 1.14 inches (29.0 mm). The record drought was exacerbated by the seasonal Santa Ana winds, blowing at an abnormally high strength. This combination of wind, heat, and dryness turned the chaparral into fire fuel. Officials believed that some of the fires generated their own winds, similar to the Oakland firestorm of 1991. The effects of the smoke were felt as far away as Brentwood in the East Bay, near Stockton, where it impacted local weather. High-speed Santa Ana winds also rendered the use of dropping water from fire fighting aircraft inefficient: until such winds abate, most payloads of water are just dispersed by the wind over an area so large that the water evaporates before it can reach a large fire on the ground.

The San Diego Union-Tribune reported,

Santa Ana winds blowing up to 60 mph (97 km/h) combined with temperatures into the 90s to create in the worst possible fire conditions.

At one point, swirling winds threatened to bring fire into densely populated urban areas. At the height of the Santa Ana winds on October 22, sustained wind speeds reached 90 mph (140 km/h), with wind gusts up to 112 mph (180 km/h) reported.

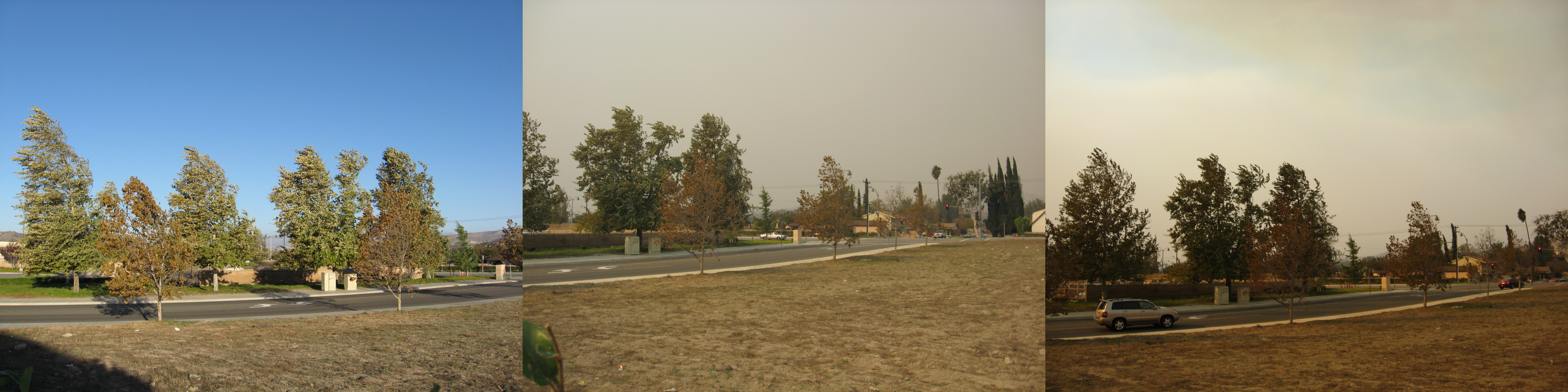
A comparison of the Simi Valley skyline from October 21, 2007 (left and center) to October 22, 2007 (right)

== Impact ==
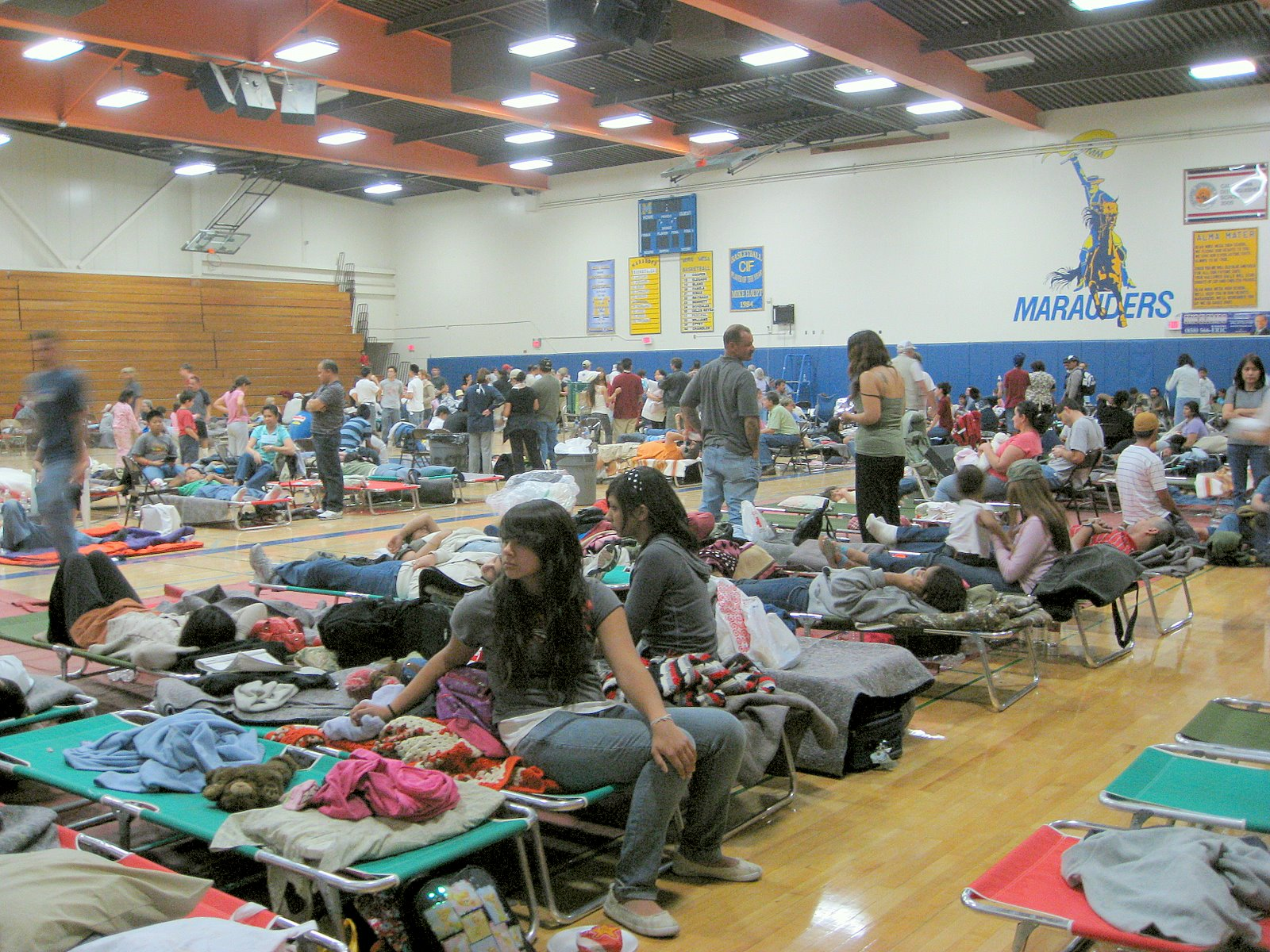
Evacuees at evacuation site Mira Mesa High School

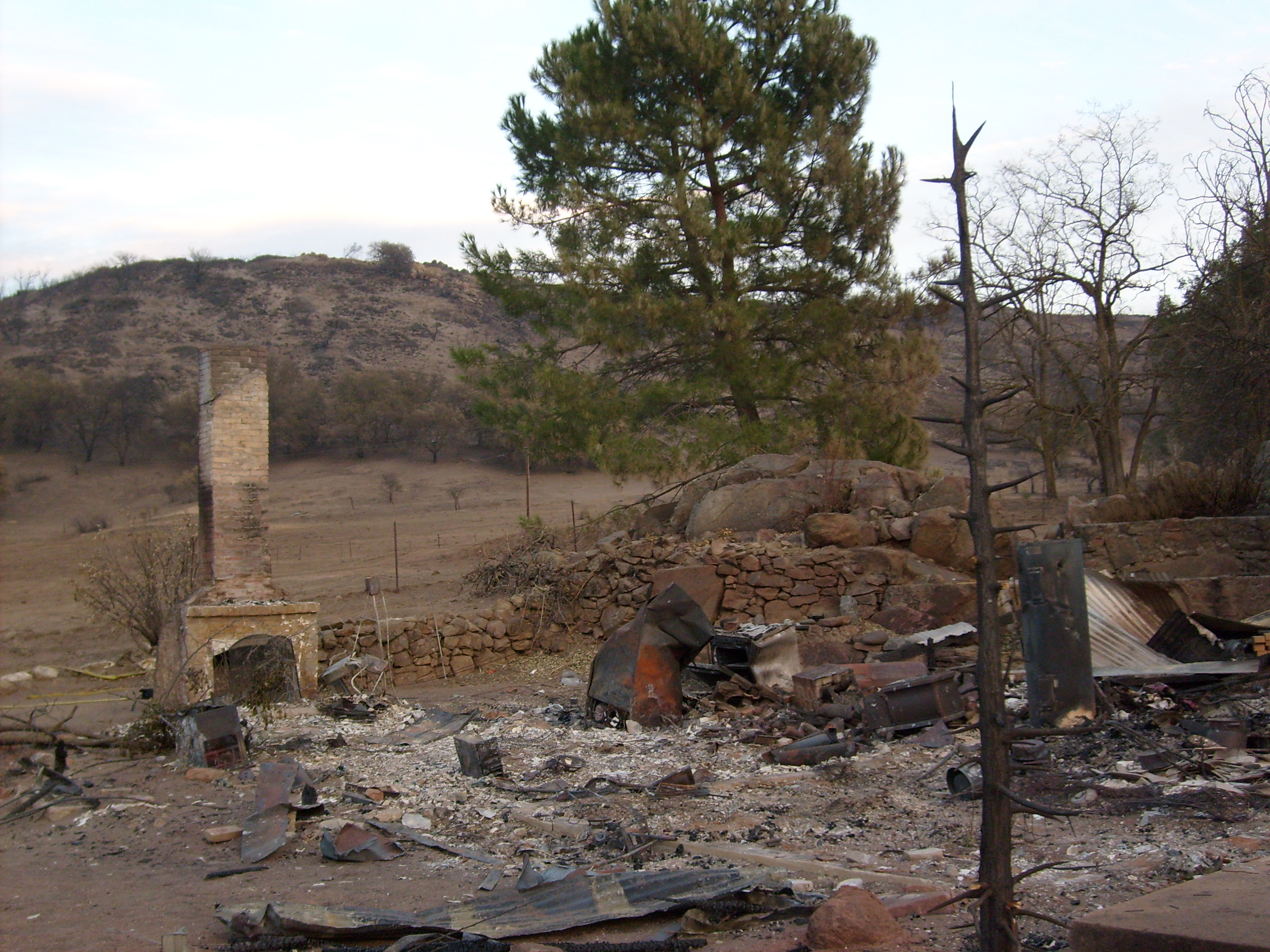
The remains of a home destroyed by the Witch Creek Fire

On October 21, the Harris Fire damaged and disabled the Southwest Power Link, a 500,000-volt power line from Arizona to San Diego. Power outages were reported in Los Angeles, Orange, San Diego, and other counties on October 22 to 333,500 Southern California Edison customers, most being restored within 24 hours. The power outage also affected the areas of Ojai, Oxnard, Simi Valley, Santa Clarita, Thousand Oaks, Agoura Hills, Rialto, Fontana, San Bernardino, Rancho Cucamonga, Mira Loma, Hesperia, Corona, Bloomington, Irvine, Calimesa and Rubidoux. This outage also caused 230 people to be without power in Malibu. The California Independent System Operator Corp declared an energy transmission emergency in southern California on October 23, due to wildfires affecting the lines. 500,000-, 230,000- and 138,000-volt lines were disabled in San Diego, and some lines in other areas were also disabled. 24,992 people lost power, due to the lack of power from the power grid. During the crisis, Mexico provided power to help augment the electrical needs of the San Diego area.

Authorities have stated that the evacuations, which displaced more than 900,000 people, have been the largest evacuation number in the history of California. By mid-morning on October 22, 2007, thousands of evacuees were taking shelter in Qualcomm Stadium and other locations throughout San Diego. On the afternoon of October 22, 2007, the Marines evacuated some planes from Marine Corps Air Station Miramar to other military bases in California and Arizona. The Navy moved all non-essential personnel from Naval Base San Diego barracks onto nearby vessels to accommodate refugees. The San Diego Wild Animal Park moved some animals to the on-site animal hospital for their protection.

The Horno Fire had charred 6,000 acres (24 km^{2}) in Camp Pendleton by 4:00 A.M PDT, on October 24, 2007. It caused the closure of Interstate 5 and it also caused Amtrak California to stop Pacific Surfliner service between Oceanside and San Clemente. Traffic was being diverted to Interstate 15, which had itself been closed earlier. Illegal migrant workers were endangered by the crisis, sometimes staying at work in the fields within mandatory evacuation zones. Many had lived in the canyons nearby and distrusted officials. When fleeing the fires, some were arrested, while others were turned away from shelters due to lack of adequate identification. Some Mexican firefighters expressed concern about their countrymen, while others felt the migrant workers were aware of the risks they were taking.

Only a few cases of looting were documented. Six people were arrested for stealing supplies from Qualcomm stadium, another was arrested for theft after being found in possession of stolen goods in the Jamul fire area, and two were arrested near the Tecate border crossing.

=== Air quality and effects on health ===
The concentration of particulate matter 10 micrometers and smaller (designated PM10) reached unhealthy levels as a result of the fires. PM10 particles are small enough to enter deep into the lungs, and possibly the bloodstream. San Diego city attorney Michael Aguirre, citing concerns over weather conditions and air quality, urged the city to consider a voluntary evacuation of the entire city.

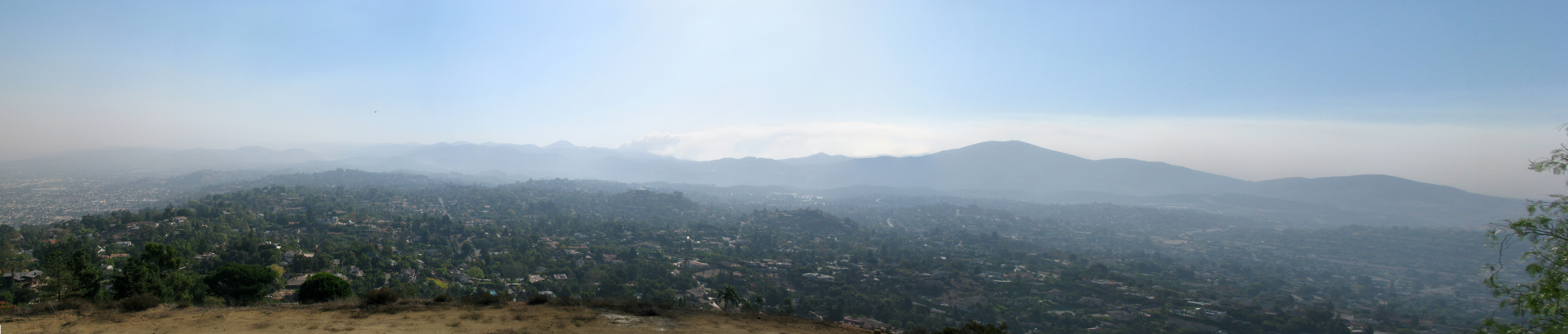
Smoke fills the horizon in East San Diego County, October 22, 2007.

== Response ==
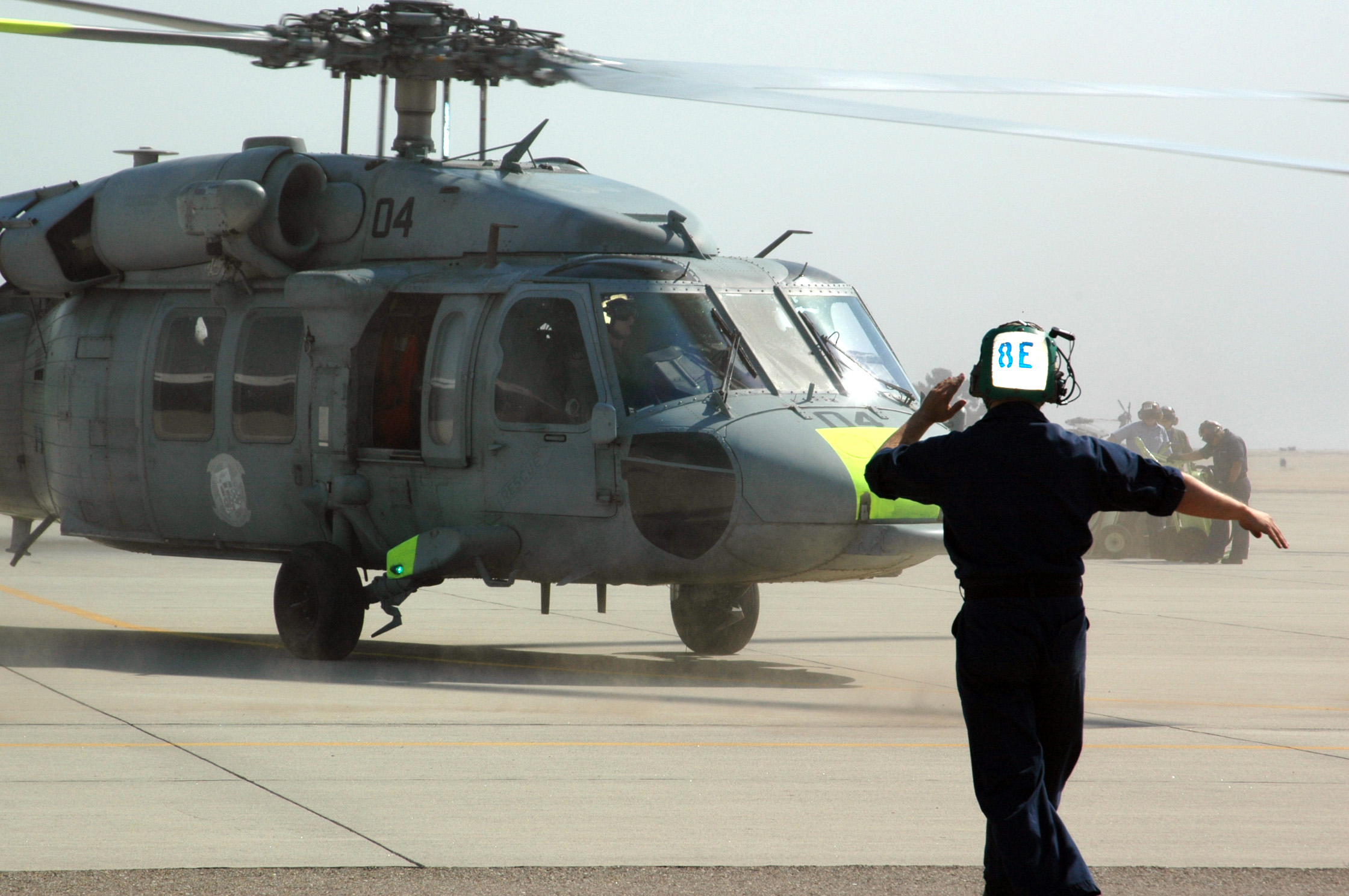
At Naval Air Station North Island, a plane captain launches an MH-60S Seahawk from Helicopter Sea Combat Squadron (HSC) 85 to conduct operations in support of the California Department of Forestry's efforts in combating the San Diego wildfires.

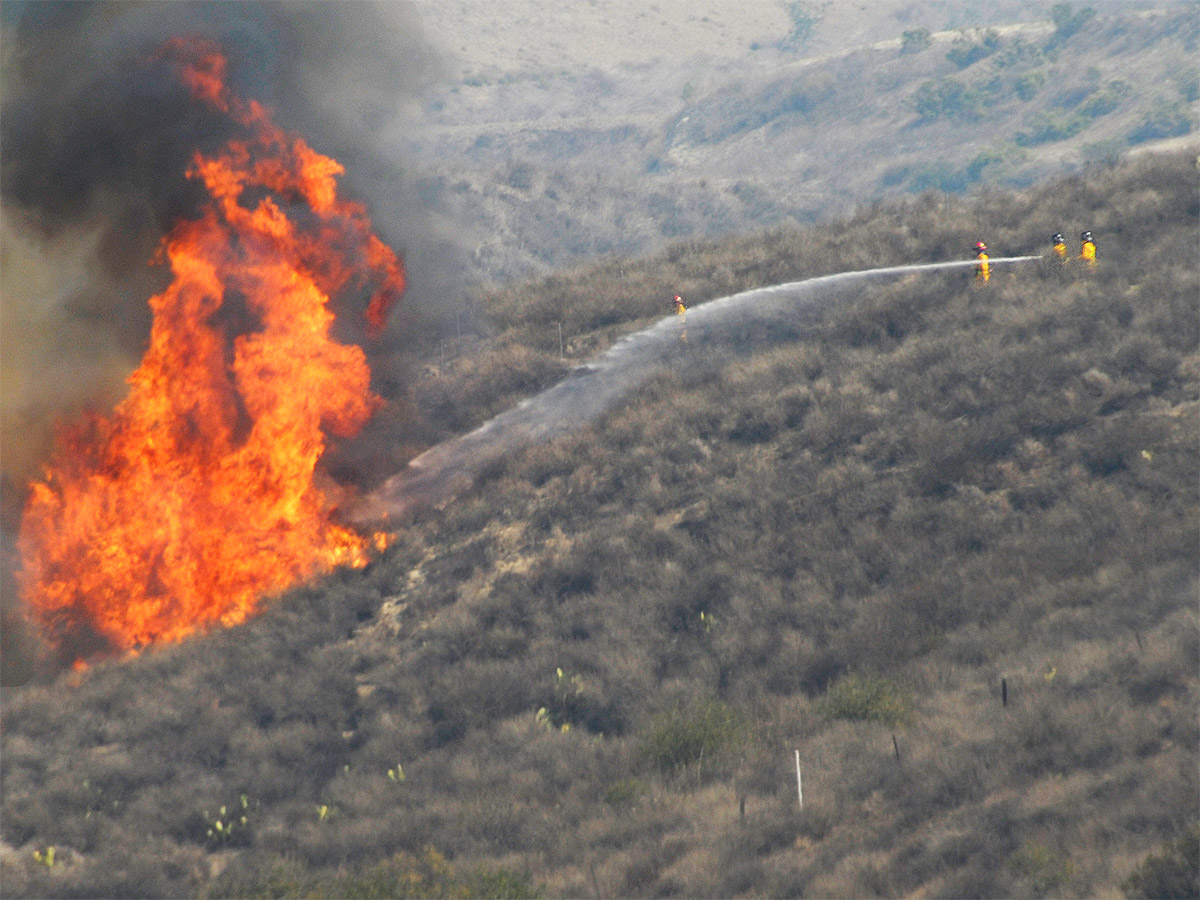
Firefighters battle a blaze near Irvine, California

Government agencies and volunteers worked together to mitigate the effects of the fires. According to the state of California's Consolidated Response web page, "There are 17 active fires in Southern California. The priority for fighting fires as of 19:30 on October 21 were the Buckweed, Witch, Harris, Canyon, Ranch, Santiago, and Sedgewick Fires." March Air Reserve Base is the primary staging area for relief supplies as coordinated by the Federal Emergency Management Agency.

With many businesses and schools closed, some people used their time off to help others. Officials estimated that 10,000 people were gathered at Qualcomm Stadium, the largest shelter point in San Diego. Besides food, blankets and water, volunteers provided toys for children, massages, and a live rock and roll band performance. CERT teams, in various cities, received their first activation since the program's inception in this region. Trained volunteers provided assistance ranging from coordinating relief, to acting as a fire department auxiliary. Religious groups such as Victim Relief Ministries, Giving Children Hope, Hope Force International, Apostolic World Relief, and the Salvation Army responded by opening places of worship, donating supplies, and feeding workers and evacuees.

The Department of Defense contributed twelve engines for firefighting efforts. The National Guard called more than 2,400 troops, with 17,000 available if needed; of which 100 California National Guard medical personnel provided medical assistance. Six crews from the Navy's Helicopter Sea Combat Squadron 85 based at Naval Air Station North Island were assigned to battle the Witch Creek fire. They flew MH-60 Seahawk helicopters equipped with a 420-gallon water bucket and they were the only local Navy teams trained to fight fires from the air. Marine Corps Air Station Miramar contributed several aircraft as well as fire fighting trucks to operations based in Ramona. One of the larger airtankers, the Martin Mars, sent through a private contract from its home in Port Alberni, British Columbia on October 25, landing on Lake Elsinore in Riverside County, California. It has a 7,000 gallon capacity. Two other airtankers and their crews from Quebec worked on the fires, part of an annual three-month contract with the state of California.

California Governor Arnold Schwarzenegger declared a state of emergency in seven California counties where fires burned. President George W. Bush concurred and visited the region on Thursday, October 25, 2007.

Rep. Duncan Hunter criticized state fire officials for delaying the use of Marine helicopters until CalFire spotters were in position to coordinate their efforts. However, California Fire Marshal Kate Dargan said that the Marines and officials at CalFire were following procedures worked out with the military after serious problems with air coordination during the 2003 California wildfires. Other state officials also praised the federal response. Aaron McLear, a spokesman for Schwarzenegger, said the governor "is getting everything he needs from the federal government".

NBC Nightly News reported that with the evacuations reaching about 950,000 people, this was the largest peacetime movement of Americans since the Civil War era, although similar evacuation figures were cited for Hurricane Rita and Hurricane Katrina.

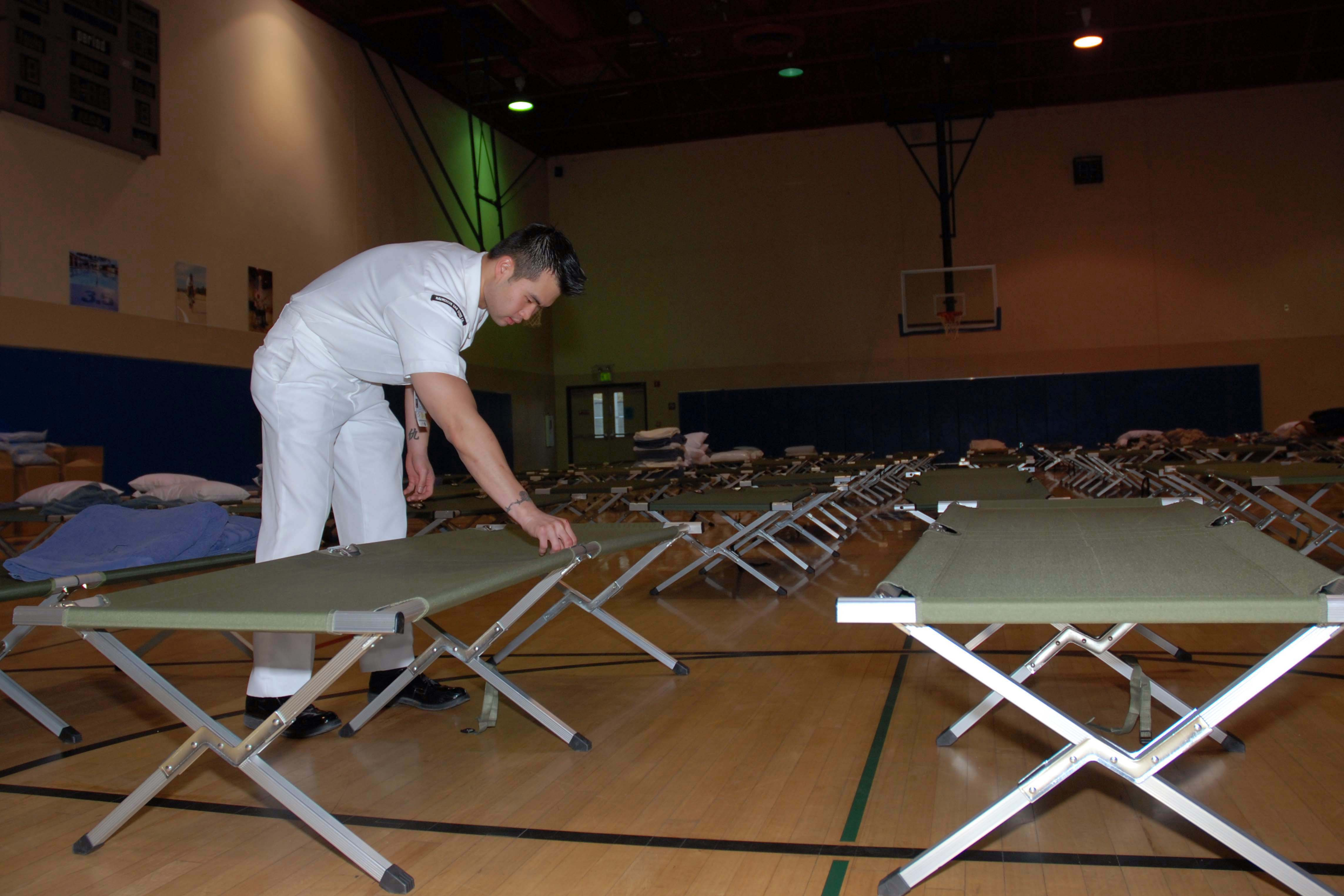
Cots prepared for potential evacuees

On November 6, 2007, the state of California reported that the fires were under control. On November 9, the last vole of wildfires were finally contained. According to the state's consolidated report on the fires, Governor Arnold Schwarzenegger "called on the Blue Ribbon Task Force to assess the next steps to take at federal, state and local levels of government to prevent and fight future fires. Additionally, the Governor asked the task force to review the Governor’s Blue Ribbon Fire Commission’s recommendations, generated after the 2003 fires, to evaluate if the recommendations are still the best and most effective ways in preventing and fighting fires."

== See also ==
- List of California wildfires
- Wildfires in California-related topics
- FIRESCOPE
