= Los Angeles fire =

Los Angeles fire or Los Angeles wildfire may refer to:

== 20th century ==
- 1933 Griffith Park fire
- 1961 Bel Air Fire
- Other Griffith Park fires

== 2000s ==
- Topanga Fire, 2005 fire in San Fernando Valley
- October 2007 California wildfires
- 2009 California wildfires

== 2010s ==
- La Tuna Fire, September 2017 fire in Verdugo Mountains
- December 2017 Southern California wildfires

== 2020s ==
- Palisades Fire (2021), a wildfire that burned in Topanga State Park
- The January 2025 Southern California wildfires, including:
  - Eaton Fire
  - Palisades Fire
  - Hughes Fire
  - Kenneth Fire
  - Hurst Fire
  - Sunset Fire
  - Lidia Fire
  - Olivias Fire

== See also ==
- List of California wildfires
- Category:Fires in California
- Category:Wildfires in Los Angeles County, California
