= Witch Fire =

2007 wildfire in Southern California

Witch Creek Fire
- Part of the October 2007 California wildfires
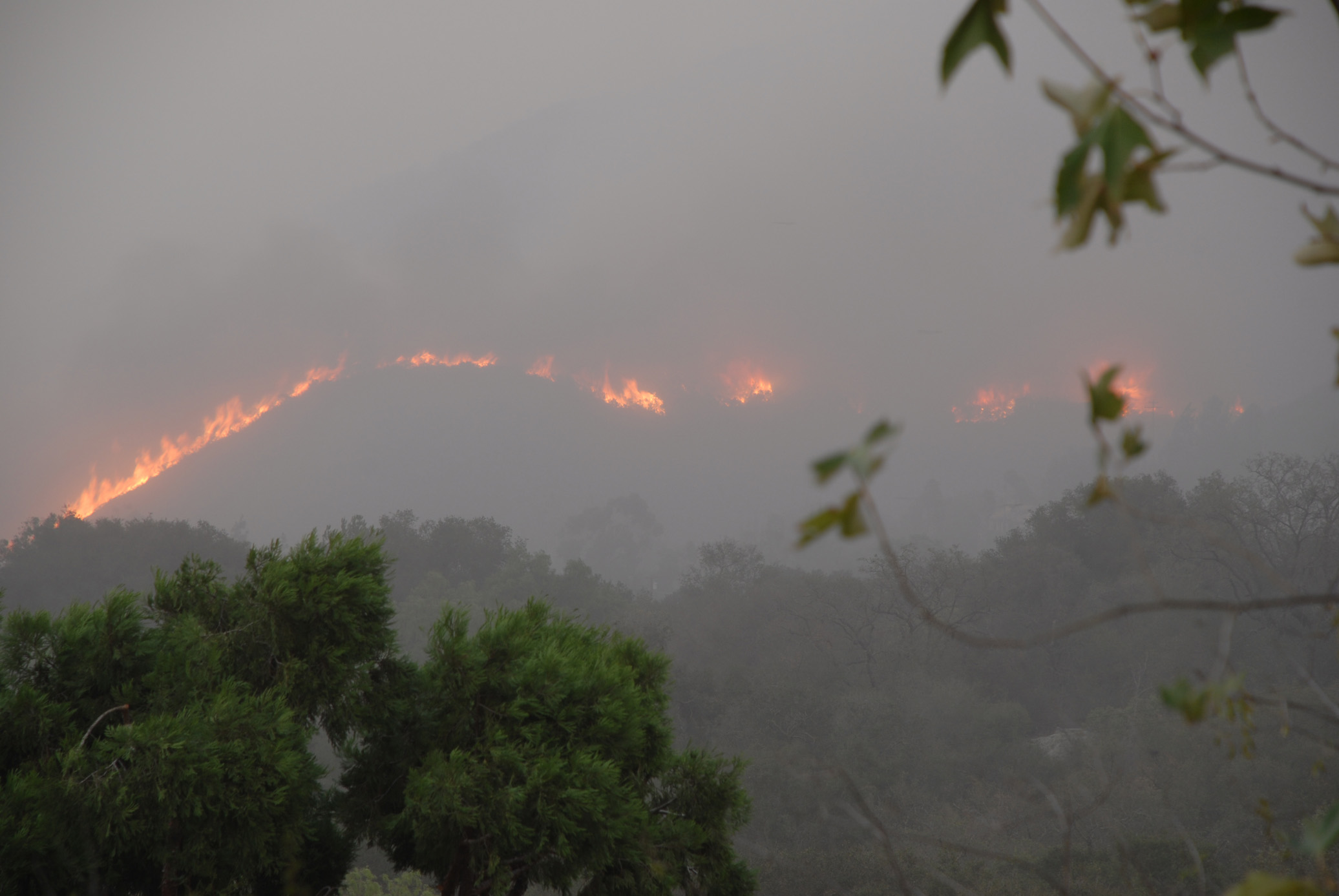
- The Witch Creek Fire burning down the northern side of Bernardo Mountain the morning of October 23, 2007
- Date: October 21, 2007 –; November 13, 2007 (Note: The original Witch Fire perimeter was fully contained on November 6.)
- Location: San Diego County, California, US

Statistics
- Burned area: 197,990 acres (801 km^{2})

Impacts
- Deaths: 2 civilians
- Injuries: 55 firefighters: 15 injured by the Poomacha Fire
- Structures lost: 1,265 residential structures; 587 outbuildings
- Cost: $1.339 billion (equivalent to $2.079 billion in 2025)

Ignition
- Cause: Downed electric power lines

The Witch Creek Fire, also known as the Witch Fire, was the second-largest wildfire of the 2007 California wildfire season, burning 197,990 acres (801 km^{2}) of land in San Diego County. Fanned by powerful Santa Ana winds, the Witch Creek Fire rapidly spread westward and consumed large portions of San Diego County. During its duration, flames reached 80 to 100 feet (24 to 30 m) high, and the Witch Fire exhibited the characteristics of a firestorm at its height.

On the morning of October 22, 2007, about a day after the Witch Creek Fire had ignited, residents of San Diego County were ordered to evacuate through the Reverse 911 system. Eventually, the Witch Creek Fire led to the evacuations of 500,000 people across San Diego County. It also contributed to mass evacuations across much of Southern California, which saw 1,000,000 residents evacuate, the largest in Californian history. The Witch Fire caused at least $1.142 billion (equivalent to $1.773 billion in 2025) in insured damages alone, becoming the costliest wildfire of 2007. As of 2022, the Witch Fire is the nineteenth-largest wildfire in modern California history, as well as the seventh-most destructive wildfire on record in California.

== Fire progression ==
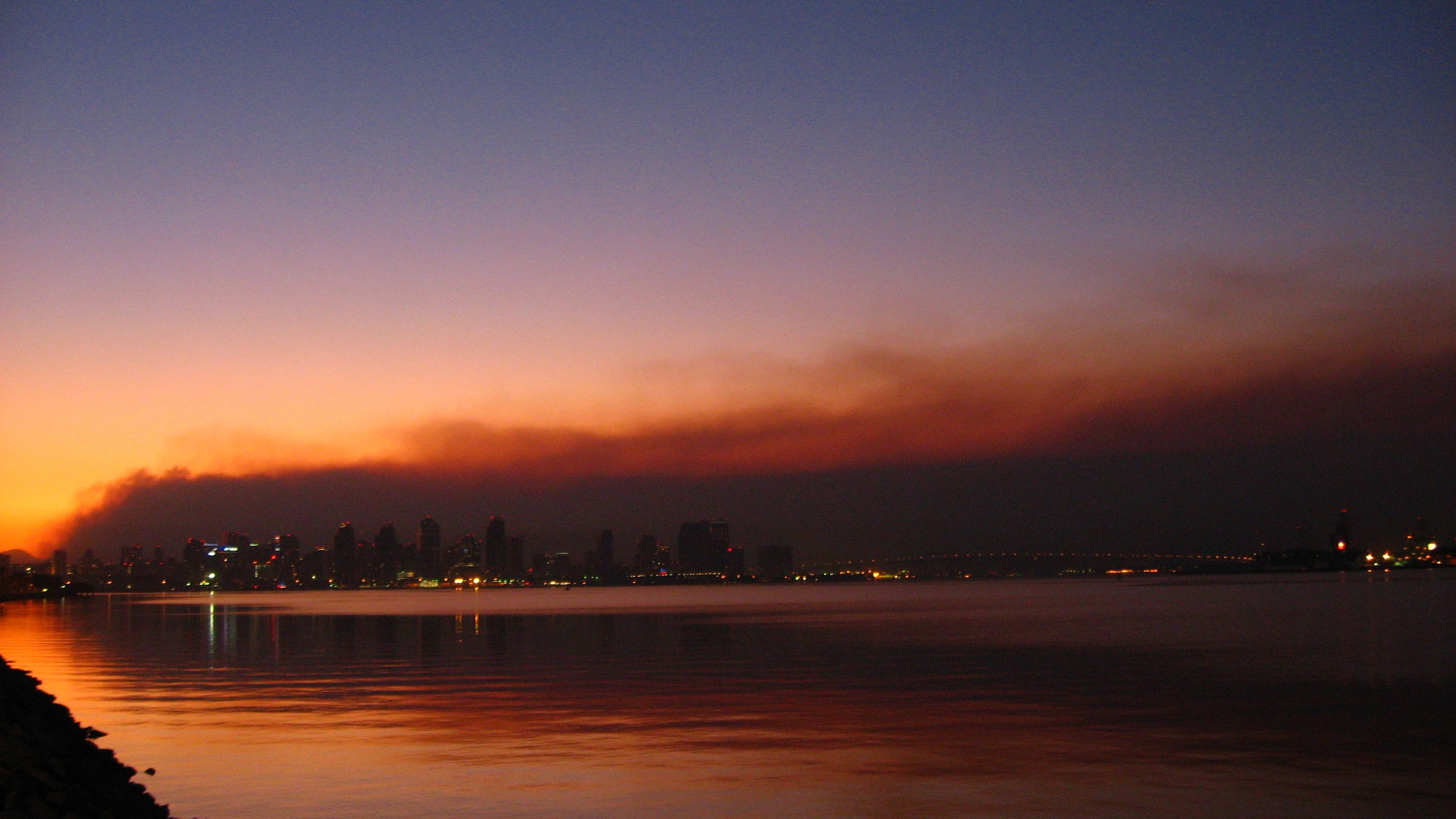
San Diego skyline against the smoke at sunrise, on October 23, 2007.

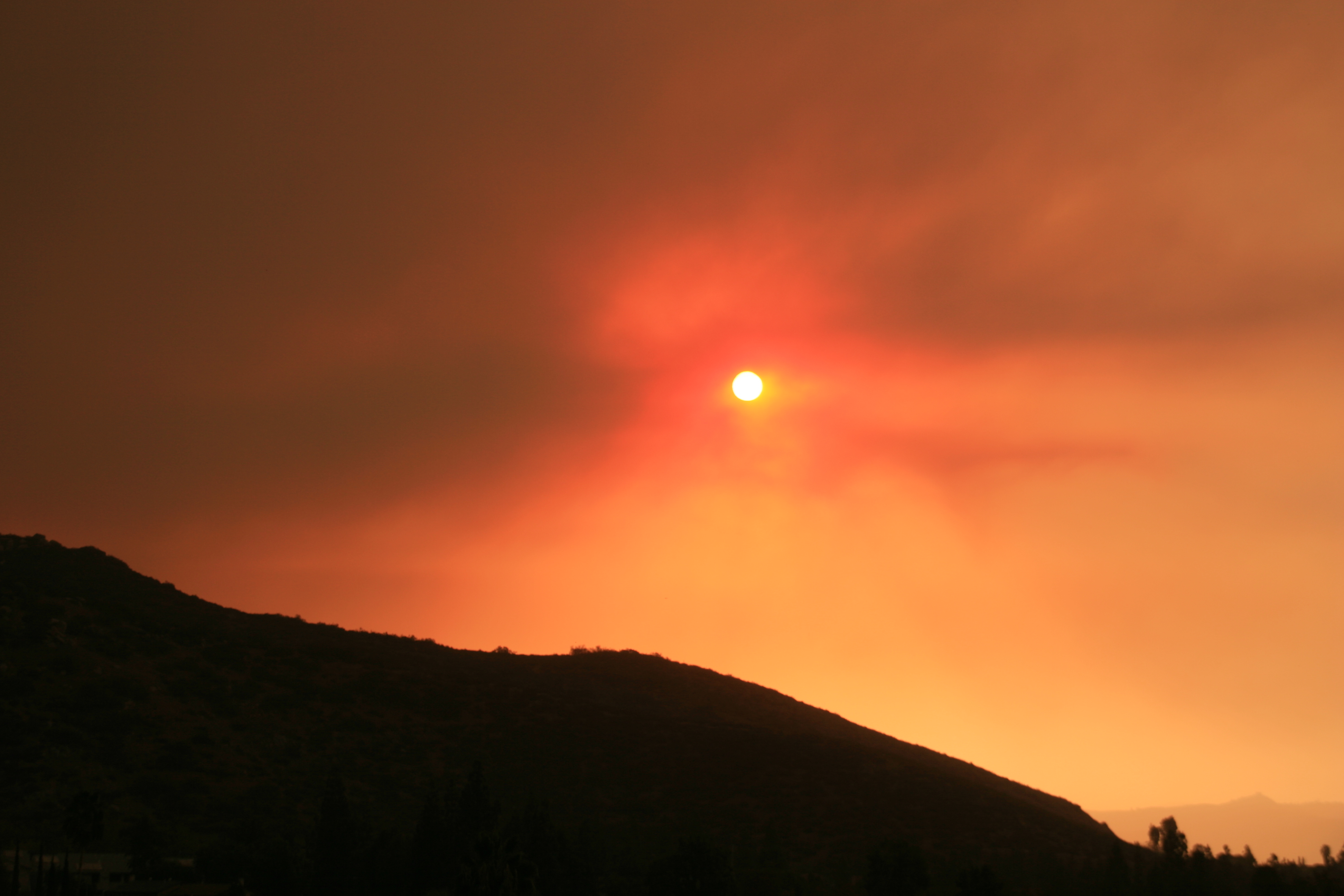
Image of the smoke-filled sky in San Diego, on the morning of October 22, 2007.

The Witch Creek Fire started in Witch Creek Canyon near Santa Ysabel, at 12:35 p.m. PDT on Sunday, October 21, 2007, after powerful Santa Ana winds blew down a power line, releasing sparks into the wind. The Witch Fire quickly spread to San Diego Country Estates, Ramona, Rancho Bernardo, Poway, and Escondido. From there, the fire jumped over Interstate 15 and continued west, causing significant damage in Lake Hodges, Del Dios, and Rancho Santa Fe.

Strong Santa Ana winds pushed the fires west towards the coast. San Diego County Sheriff William B. Kolendar stated that the Witch Creek Fire could be "well in excess of the Cedar Fire of 2003". While many coastal communities were evacuated as the fire moved west, the shifting winds prevented it from directly threatening those areas. By the evening of October 21, the Witch Creek Fire had expanded to 2,000 acres (8 km^{2}).

=== Witch and Guejito fires merge ===
On Monday, October 22, the Santa Ana winds peaked, reaching sustained wind speeds of 90 mph (140 km/h), with winds gusting up to 112 mph (180 km/h). The extremely powerful Santa Ana winds fanned the wildfires in Southern California, causing many of the wildfires to rapidly expand westward. At 1:30 a.m. on October 22, the Guejito Fire ignited southeast of the San Diego Wild Animal Park, within the San Pasqual River drainage. By early morning, the Guejito Fire had expanded to Interstate 15, forcing the closure of the freeway in both directions, which disrupted some evacuations from areas affected by the Witch Creek Fire. In less than an hour, the Witch Creek Fire caught up with the Guejito Fire to the west, and the two fires combined into a single, massive wildfire before dawn. With powerful Santa Ana winds gusting over 100 mph (160 km/h), the Witch Creek Fire then jumped over Interstate 15, rapidly burning into Rancho Bernardo. Residents located between the Del Dios Highway and State Route 56 along with the unincorporated area of Escondido were ordered to evacuate. A firefighter stated that the conditions they faced were "twice as bad" as the Cedar Fire in 2003, with firefighters separating houses into those that they could save and those that they couldn't.

The Witch Creek Fire continued to race westward, and by that night, mandatory evacuation orders had been expanded westward to Escondido and Del Mar, all the way up to the coast. A dispatch from the city of Del Mar's web site stated that all Del Mar residents had to evacuate Evacuations were also ordered for Scripps Ranch, specifically everything south of Scripps Poway Parkway, north of MCAS Miramar, east of Interstate 15, and west of Highway 67. The Mesa Grande Indian Reservation was also evacuated due to the Witch Fire. Residents of the Barona Indian Reservation were advised to leave, though the evacuation was not mandatory. The casino on the reservation was closed. By the end of October 22, the Witch Creek Fire had exploded to 145,000 acres (587 km^{2}) and was still rapidly expanding.

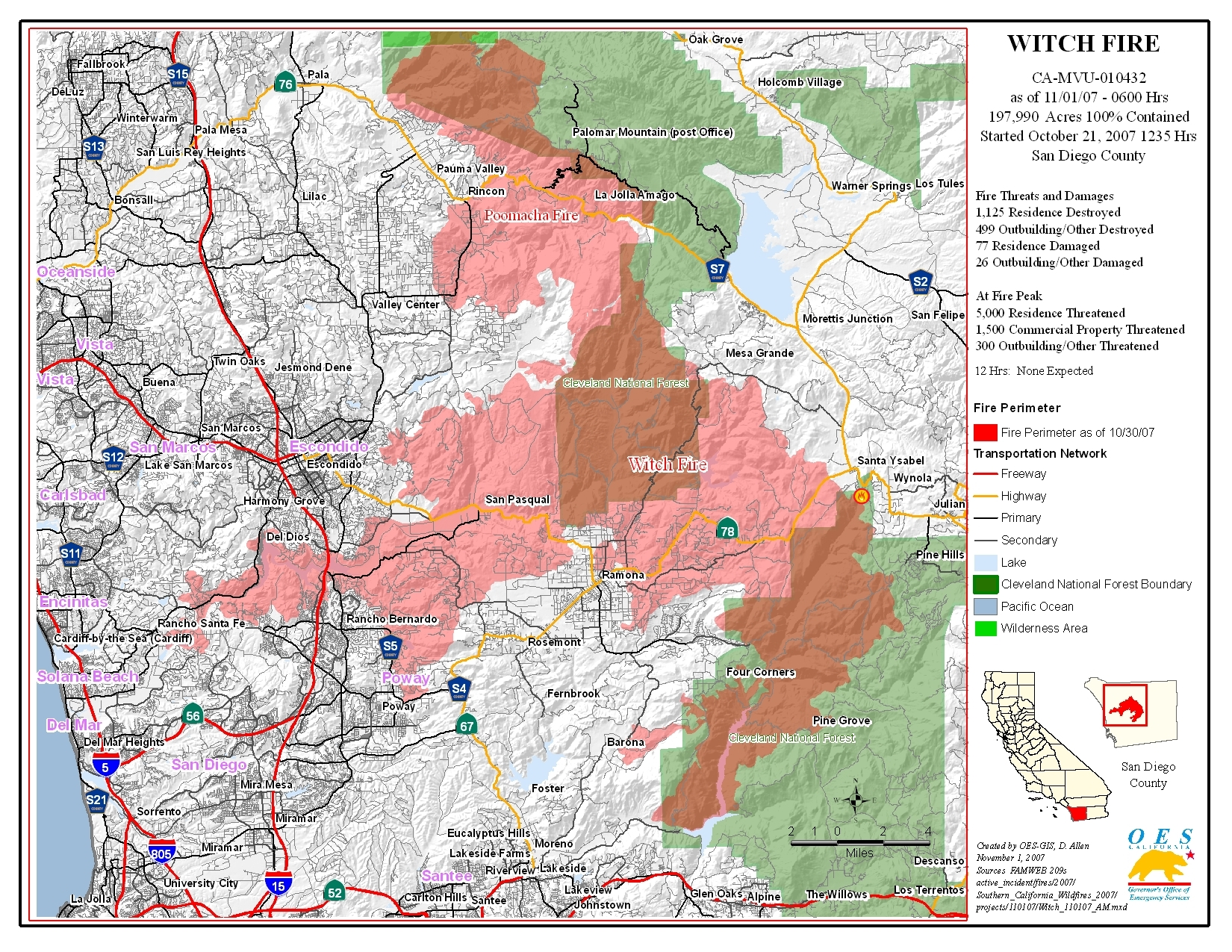
Burn area map of the Witch Creek Fire on October 30, after it had merged with the Poomacha Fire.

=== The Witch Fire reaches the Poomacha Fire ===
At 3:13 a.m. on October 23, the Poomacha Fire was ignited in the La Jolla Indian Reservation in northeastern San Diego County. On the same day, the Poomacha Fire quickly exploded to 20,000 acres (81 km^{2}), with most of that growth occurring within one and a half hours. During that afternoon, evacuations of Del Mar, Chula Vista, Poway, Del Mar Heights, and Scripps Ranch were lifted for many residents. That night, the town of Julian, California, was ordered to evacuate. Due to the fires, there was no power or phone service in the town.

On Wednesday, October 24, the Santa Ana winds began to subside, and the prevailing winds shifted directions, with the onshore flow blowing in from the west; this caused the Witch Creek Fire to reverse directions and begin burning eastward, ending the threat to the coastal communities. This also allowed the fire to burn previously unburned fuel (which was passed over during the initial rapid spread of the fire), threatening communities further east that had so far avoided the worst of the Witch Creek Fire. On the same day, some of the evacuation orders in place for Rancho Bernardo, Rancho Peñasquitos, 4S Ranch, and other areas west of Rancho Bernardo were lifted, after the western part of the Witch Creek Fire was contained. However, the evacuation orders in place for eastern and northern Rancho Bernardo, around Lake Hodges, were still in place.

The California Highway Patrol closed Interstate 5, after the Ammo Fire burned across the freeway; the Ammo Fire also forced the closures of the Amtrak California Surfliner service between Oceanside and San Clemente. These routes had previously been used to evacuate residents from the Witch Creek Fire areas. Traffic from Interstate 5 was diverted to Interstate 15, which had reopened since the portion of the Witch Creek Fire around Interstate 15 had been extinguished. That day, after the winds had reversed, the Witch Fire began approaching the nearby Poomacha Fire to the north, which was burning near Palomar Mountain, with firefighters and officials fearing that the two wildfires would soon merge. By this time, the Poomacha Fire had grown to 35,000 acres (142 km^{2}), and also began burning towards Palomar Mountain, to the north. Despite the fact that the Poomacha Fire was still much smaller than the Witch Creek Fire, firefighters were unable to establish a fire perimeter around the younger fire, due to the fact that other larger fires had rendered available firefighters and equipment scarce for the Poomacha Fire. On October 25, the Witch Fire and the Poomacha Fire merged into one complex fire, with the two wildfires joining to the south of Palomar Mountain.

=== Witch Fire contained ===
By October 26, the Santa Ana winds had finally subsided and the onshore flow had fully returned, slowing down the spread of the remaining wildfires and aiding firefighters in their efforts to contain them. On the same day, the Witch Fire merged with the contained McCoy Fire, which had previously burned 400 acres in the Pine Hills area, in eastern San Diego County.

On November 6, the main portion of the Witch Creek Fire was 100% contained, although the Poomacha Fire continued to burn near Palomar Mountain for another week. On November 13, the Poomacha Fire was fully contained, bringing the all the fires completely under control.

== Impacts ==
By mid-morning on October 22, thousands of evacuees were taking shelter in Qualcomm Stadium and other locations throughout San Diego. That afternoon, the Marines evacuated some planes from Marine Corps Air Station Miramar to other military bases in California and Arizona. The Navy moved all non-essential personnel from Naval Base San Diego barracks onto nearby vessels to accommodate refugees. The San Diego Wild Animal Park moved some animals to the on-site animal hospital for their protection. Both legal and illegal alien workers were endangered by the crisis, sometimes staying at work in the fields within mandatory evacuation zones. Many had lived in the canyons nearby and distrusted officials. When fleeing the fires, some were arrested, while others were turned away from shelters due to lack of adequate identification.

The Witch Creek Fire forced the evacuation of at least 500,000 people from over 346,000 homes in San Diego County. Evacuation sites in San Diego County included Qualcomm Stadium, Escondido High School, Mission Hills High School, Poway High School, Mira Mesa Senior High School, and the Del Mar Fairgrounds. Many major roads were also closed as a result of the fires and smoke. On October 22, the California Highway Patrol closed Interstate 15 in both directions between State Routes 78 and 56. On October 24, the Ammo (Horno) Fire forced the closure of Interstate 5, as well as the Amtrak California Surfliner service between Oceanside and San Clemente. Traffic from Interstate 5 was being diverted to Interstate 15, which had reopened.

=== Air quality and effects on health ===
The concentration of particulate matter 10 micrometers and smaller (designated PM10) reached unhealthy levels as a result of the fires. PM10 particles are small enough to enter deep into the lungs and possibly the bloodstream. San Diego city attorney Michael Aguirre, citing concerns over weather conditions and air quality, urged the city to consider a voluntary evacuation of the entire city.

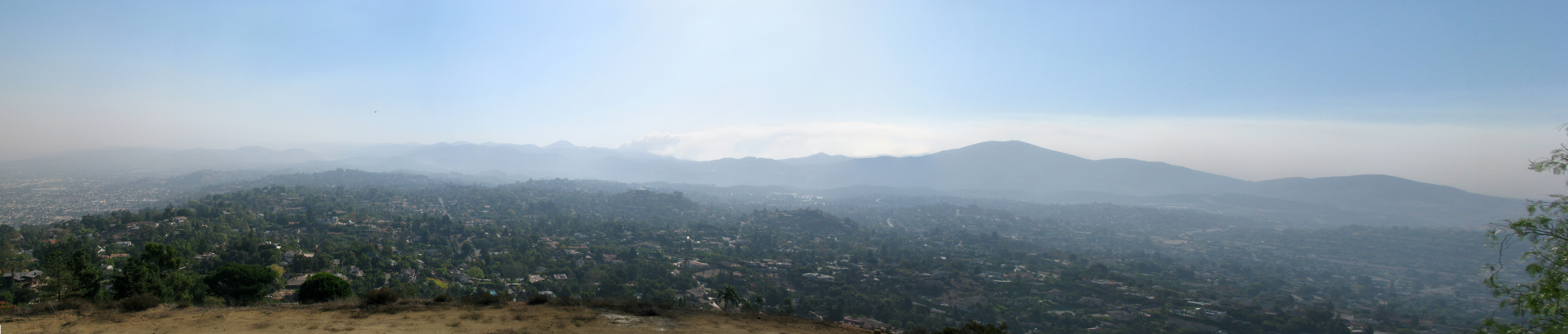
Smoke fills the horizon in East San Diego County, October 22, 2007.

=== Response ===
The Department of Defense contributed twelve engines for firefighting efforts. The California National Guard called more than 2,400 troops, with 17,000 soldiers on standby. Six crews from the Navy's Helicopter Sea Combat Squadron 85 based at Naval Air Station North Island were assigned to battle the Witch Creek Fire. They flew MH-60 Seahawk helicopters equipped with a 420-gallon water bucket and were the only local Navy teams trained to fight fires from the air. Marine Corps Air Station Miramar contributed several aircraft as well as fire fighting trucks to operations based in Ramona. One of the larger airtankers, the 7,000-gallon Martin Mars, was sent through a private contract from its home in Port Alberni, British Columbia, on October 25, landing on Lake Elsinore in Riverside County, California. Two other airtankers and their crews from Quebec worked on the fires, part of an annual three-month contract with the state of California.

California Governor Arnold Schwarzenegger declared a state of emergency in seven California counties where fires burned. President George W. Bush concurred and visited the region on Thursday, October 25, 2007.

Rep. Duncan Hunter criticized state fire officials for delaying the use of Marine helicopters until CalFire spotters were in position to coordinate their efforts. However, California Fire Marshal Kate Dargan said that the Marines and officials at CalFire were following procedures worked out with the military after serious problems with air coordination during the 2003 California wildfires.

== Aftermath ==
A total of 197,000 acres were burned by the Witch Fire. In addition, the fire killed two people, injured 40 firefighters, and destroyed 1,125 homes. The Witch Fire is estimated to have at least $1.142 billion (equivalent to $1.773 billion in 2025) in insured damages alone. As of 2022, the Witch Fire is the eighteenth-largest wildfire in modern California history, as well as the seventh-most destructive wildfire on record in California.

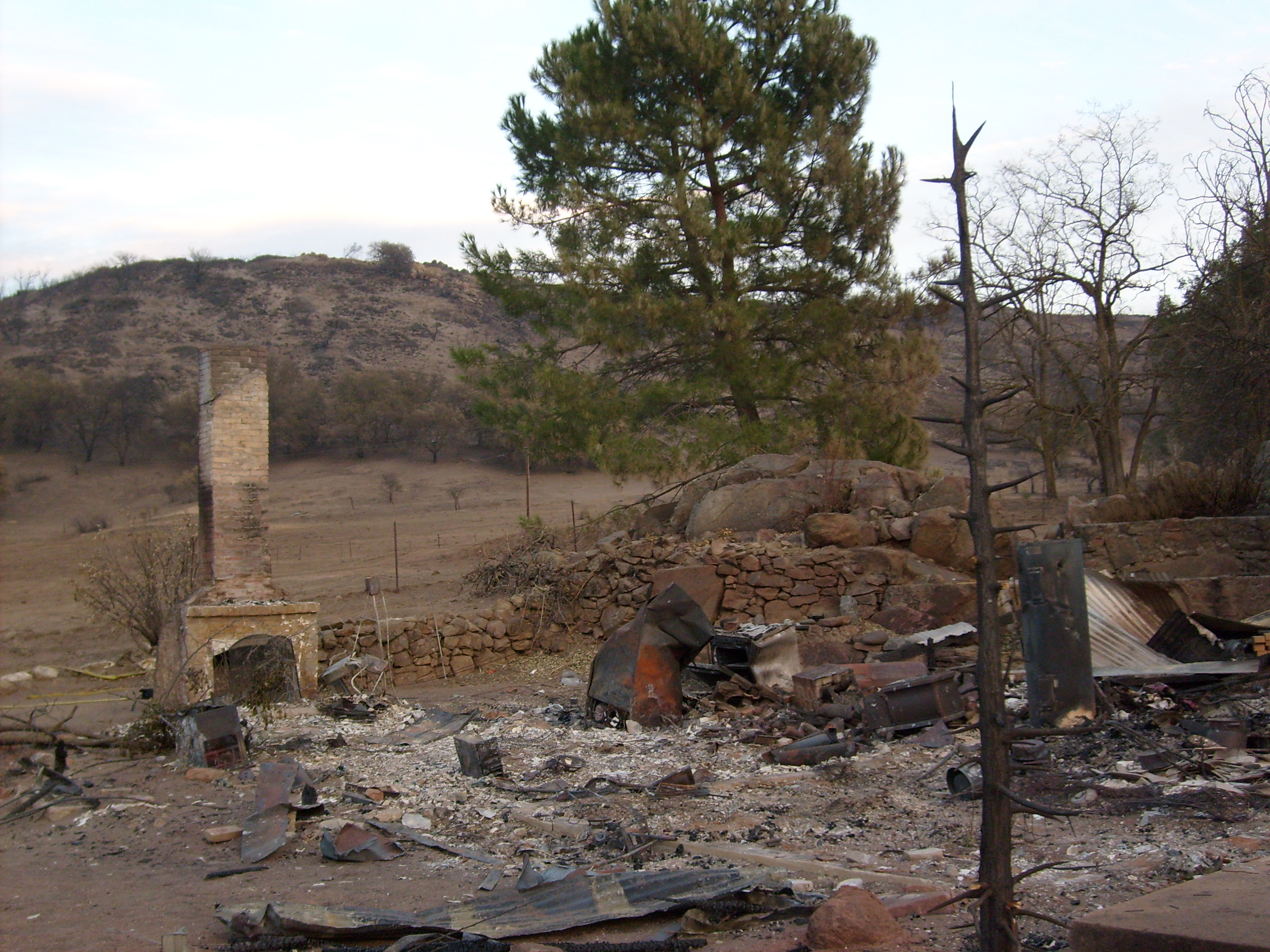
The remains of a home destroyed by the Witch Creek Fire

The California Public Utilities Commission ruled that in the Witch and Guejito fires, along with the Rice Fire, San Diego Gas & Electric had not trimmed back trees as state law requires. The power line that caused the Witch fires shorted three times in three hours, but the utility did not cut power to it for six hours. In August 2017, administrative law judges S. Pat Tsen and Sasha Goldberg ruled that the utility did not reasonably manage its facilities and that the wildfires were not outside of its control. Therefore, they ruled that the utility could not pass its uninsured costs along to its ratepayers. The PUC agreed in early December in a 5–0 vote. Legal claims after the fires totaled $5.6 billion (equivalent to $8.7 billion in 2025), $2.4 billion (equivalent to $3.7 billion) after the utility settled 2,500 lawsuits for damages. The $379 million (equivalent to $588 million) it had sought to pass along to customers represented uninsured costs.

== See also ==
- October 2007 California wildfires
  - Harris Fire
- Cedar Fire (2003)
- 2005 Labor Day brush fire
- May 2014 San Diego County wildfires
- 2016 California wildfires
- Tubbs Fire
- December 2017 Southern California wildfires
  - Thomas Fire
  - Lilac Fire
- List of California wildfires
