= San Juan Capistrano station =

Passenger train station in San Juan Capistrano, California

San Juan Capistrano, CA
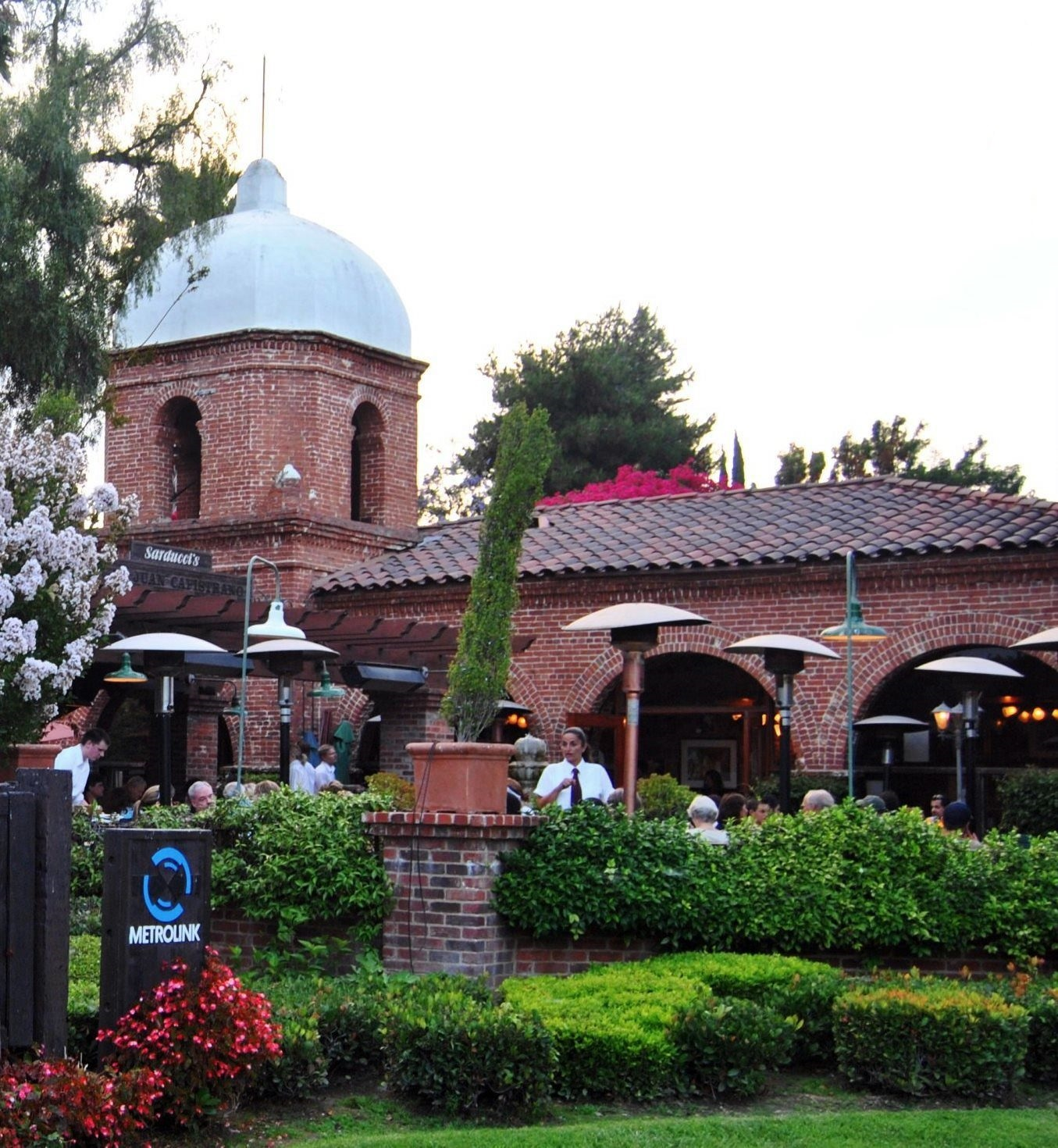
- The depot, converted into a restaurant. Except for the dome, the plaster has been removed to expose the brickwork (2011)

General information
- Location: 26701 Verdugo Street; San Juan Capistrano, California; United States
- Coordinates: 33.5023°N 117.6641°W
- Owner: City of San Juan Capistrano
- Line: SCRRA Orange Subdivision
- Platforms: 1 side platform
- Tracks: 1
- Connections: OC Bus: 91

Construction
- Parking: 255 spaces, paid
- Accessible: Yes

Other information
- Status: Staffed, station building with waiting room
- Station code: Amtrak: SNC

History
- Opened: October 27, 1894; 132 years ago
- Rebuilt: 1974
- Original company: Atchison, Topeka and Santa Fe Railway

Passengers
- FY 2025: 162,211 annually (Amtrak)
- FY 2026: 64 weekday boardings (Metrolink)

Services
Preceding station	Amtrak	Following station
Irvine toward San Luis Obispo	Pacific Surfliner	Oceanside toward San Diego
Irvine toward San Luis Obispo	Pacific Surfliner	San Clemente Pier (limited service) toward San Diego
Preceding station	Metrolink	Following station
Laguna Niguel/Mission Viejo toward San Bernardino–Downtown	Inland Empire–Orange County Line	San Clemente toward Oceanside
Laguna Niguel/Mission Viejo toward L.A. Union Station	Orange County Line	San Clemente toward Oceanside
Former services
Preceding station	Amtrak	Following station
Irvine toward Los Angeles	Orange County Commuter	Terminus
Irvine toward Los Angeles	San Diegan	San Clemente toward San Diego
Preceding station	Atchison, Topeka and Santa Fe Railway	Following station
El Toro toward Los Angeles	Surf Line	Serra (Dohery Beach) toward San Diego
- San Juan Capistrano station
- U.S. National Register of Historic Places
- U.S. Historic district – Contributing property
- Part of: Los Rios Street Historic District
- NRHP reference No.: 83001216
- Added to NRHP: April 4, 1983
Location

San Juan Capistrano station is a train station in San Juan Capistrano, California, United States served by Amtrak, the national railroad passenger system, and Metrolink, a commuter railroad. The station has a single side platform serving the single track of the SCRRA's Orange Subdivision.

The station is served by Amtrak's Pacific Surfliner, and with few exceptions is the last stop in Orange County; a few trains stop at San Clemente Pier before crossing into San Diego County. It is also served by Metrolink's Orange County Line and Inland Empire–Orange County Line.

== Hours and frequency ==
San Juan Capistrano station is served by 26 Amtrak Pacific Surfliner trains (13 in each direction) evenly spaced throughout the day.

San Juan Capistrano station is served by 12 Metrolink Orange County Line trains (6 in each direction) each weekday, evenly spaced throughout the day. Weekend service consists of 4 trains (2 in each direction) on both Saturday and Sunday, running in each direction in the morning and evening.

Additionally, the station is served by 2 Metrolink Inland Empire–Orange County Line trains (1 in each direction) each weekday, running in each direction in the morning and evening. Weekend service consists of 4 trains (2 in each direction) on both Saturday and Sunday, heading towards Orange County in the morning and towards the Inland Empire in the evening.

== History ==
The San Juan Capistrano station was originally opened October 27, 1894 by the Atchison, Topeka and Santa Fe Railway. It was one of the earliest examples of Mission Revival Style architecture in railway stations. In 1966, the station was closed, two years ahead of the end of Santa Fe passenger service to the city. Amtrak added San Juan Capistrano as a flag stop on its Los Angeles–San Diego San Diegan service on May 19, 1974. A year later, the depot was converted into a restaurant, with vintage rolling stock used to expand the space. Orange County Commuter service terminated here starting on April 30, 1990, and that service was conveyed to Metrolink when the Orange County Line opened on March 28, 1994. In 1995, the complex received a refurbishment, resulting in two restaurants, one located in the depot building, as well as Amtrak ticketing services and a waiting room, located in two boxcars.

The station serviced 237,776 passengers in 2018.

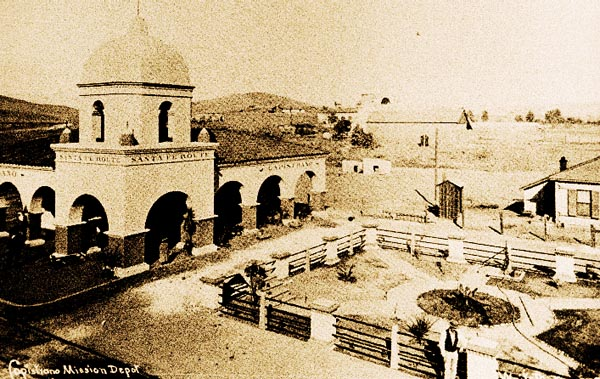
Postcard of the original Santa Fe depot in 1894

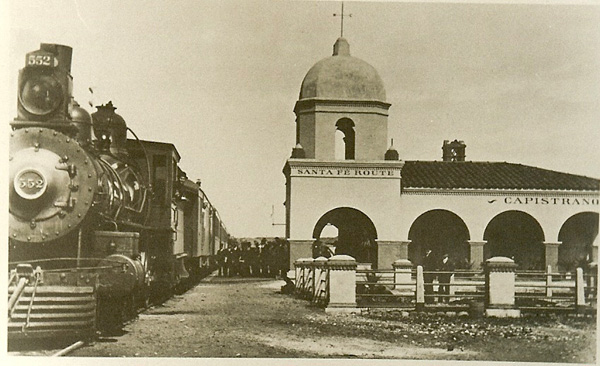
The station in 1895

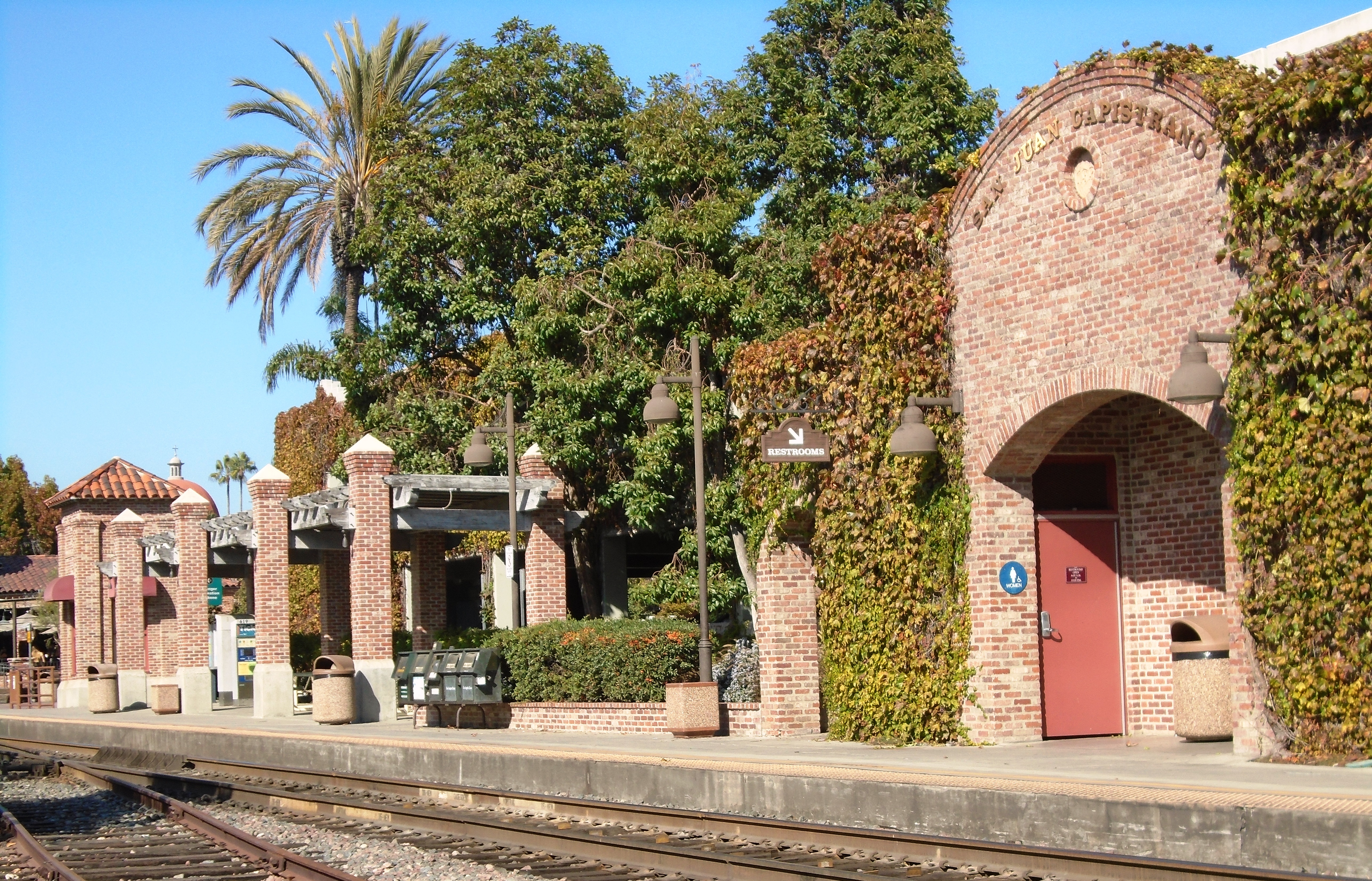
Trackside view from the south (2019)
