= Rice Fire =

2007 wildfire in Southern California

- Part of October 2007 California wildfires
- Date: October 22, 2007 –; November 1, 2007
- Location: Rice Creek, Fallbrook, California

Statistics
- Burned area: 9,472 acres (38 km^{2})

Impacts
- Deaths: None reported
- Injuries: 5 firefighters
- Structures lost: 206 residential structures; 2 commercial properties; 40 outbuildings
- Cost: $6.5 million (2007 USD)

The Rice Fire was a wildfire that burned from October 22, 2007 until November 1, 2007, in Fallbrook, California. While not one of the largest fires of the 2007 California wildfire season, only burning 9,472 acres (38 km^{2}), it was one of the most destructive, with 248 structures being destroyed.

As the fire grew, it caused major evacuations and the closure of Interstate 15. The California Public Utilities Commission ruled that in the Rice fire, San Diego Gas and Electric had not trimmed back trees as state law requires. It was also at fault, the commission said, in the Witch and Guejito fires. The power line that caused the Witch fires shorted three times in three hours, but the utility didn't cut power to it for six hours.

In August 2017, administrative law judges S. Pat Tsen and Sasha Goldberg ruled that the utility did not reasonably manage its facilities and that the wildfires were not outside of its control. Therefore, they ruled, the utility could not pass its uninsured costs along to its ratepayers. The PUC agreed in early December in a 5-0 vote.

The Rice fire began when a dead tree limb fell across power lines. It burned 9,472 acres and destroyed 206 homes. The Witch and Guejito fires combined to burn 197,000 acres, killed two people, injured 40 firefighters and destroyed 1,141 homes and 239 vehicles. Legal claims after the fires totalled $5.6 billion, $2.4 billion after the utility settled 2500 lawsuits for damages. The $379 million it had sought to pass along to customers represented uninsured costs.

== See also ==
- Witch Fire
- October 2007 California wildfires
