= Island Fire =

2007 wildfire in Southern California

- Part of the 2007 California wildfires
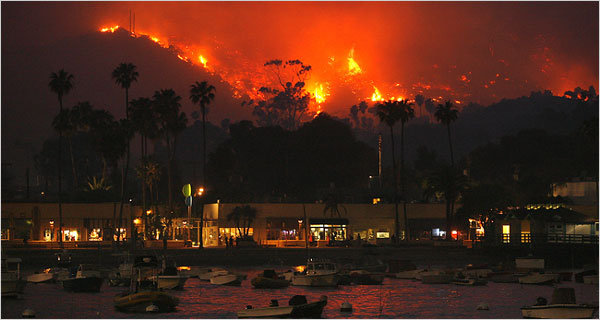
- The Island Fire as seen from Avalon Harbor.
- Date: May 10, 2007 – May 15, 2007
- Location: Avalon, Catalina Island, California

Statistics
- Burned area: 4,750 acres (19 km^{2})
- Land use: Chaparral

Impacts
- Structures lost: 6

Ignition
- Cause: Contractors cutting steel wire with a torch
- Motive: accidental

The Island Fire was a brush fire that broke out in the hills north and west of Avalon, located on Catalina Island, California, United States, from May 10 through May 15, 2007. The fire burned 4,750 acres (19 km^{2}) of interior chaparral. The fire loomed large over the town of Avalon, but ultimately only one residence and six commercial structures were destroyed.

== The fire ==
On May 10, 2007, a fire broke out in the hills north and west of Avalon. At least three structures burned including one residence, and 4,750 acres (19.2 km^{2}) of the Island were burned. Avalon City Councilman Scott Nelson said: "We've lost five or six small businesses in Falls Canyon and a construction company building in Birdpark Canyon."

Nelson said about 100 firefighters were battling the blaze and that another 200 new recruits, arriving by hovercraft and Marine helicopters, were bedding down at the airport to work the day shift in the morning. Catalina Express was also running extra boats through the night to take people off the island. 700 evacuees were reportedly at the Cesar E. Chavez center in Long Beach.

The eCatalina.com newsletter reported on June 1, 2007, about the fire, "Fortunately, the fire that captured the attention of the nation did not cause any damage to the charm of the City of Avalon, the community of Two Harbors or the activities, shopping, tours, restaurants and accommodations our visitors enjoy. 4,750 acres (19 km^{2}) of interior chaparral burned sparing most wildlife, including the Catalina Island Fox, bald eagles and bison."

== Cause and prosecution ==
According to the Associated Press, the blaze was started by contractors cutting steel wire with a torch. On February 4, 2009, Gary Dennis Hunt, 51, of Indiana pleaded no contest in Long Beach Superior Court to a charge of recklessly starting a brush fire in relation to the wildfire. Hunt agreed to pay at least $5 million in restitution, with the full amount to be paid left to a later hearing. Hunt was sentenced on August 25, 2009 to five years' probation and 90 days of jail or Caltrans service. At that time restitution of over $4 million to three entities was ordered, with restitution to Southern California Edison scheduled to be determined in a November 19, 2009 hearing.
