= San Clemente Pier station =

Passenger train station in San Clemente, California, United States

San Clemente, CA–Pier
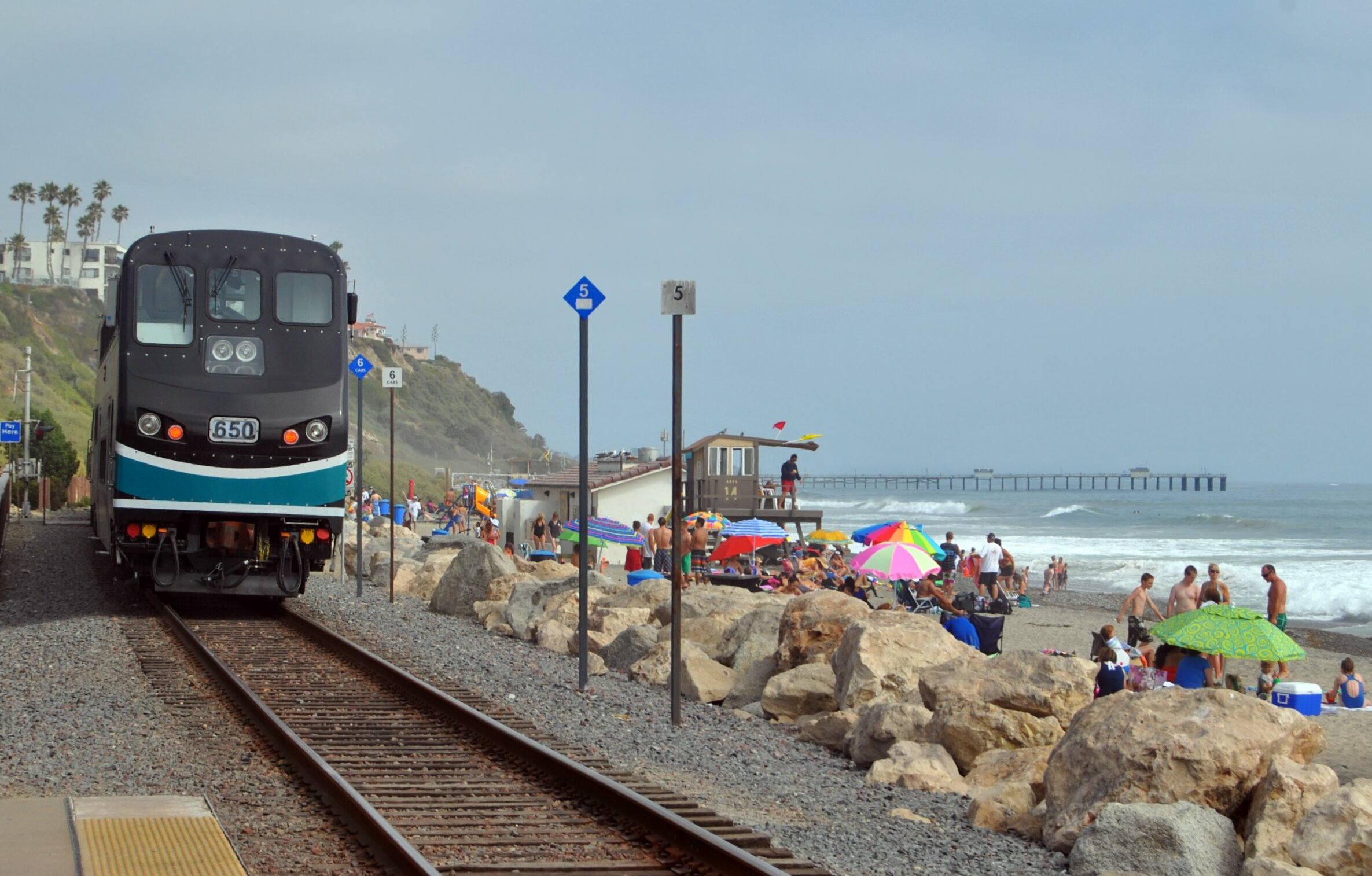
- A Metrolink train departing San Clemente station in July 2011

General information
- Location: 615 Avenida Victoria; San Clemente, California; United States
- Coordinates: 33°25′09″N 117°37′10″W
- Owner: Orange County Transportation Authority
- Line: SCRRA Orange Subdivision
- Platforms: 1 side platform
- Tracks: 1
- Connections: San Clemente Trolley: Red Line

Construction
- Parking: 144 spaces, 2 accessible spaces, paid
- Cycle facilities: Racks
- Accessible: Yes

Other information
- Status: Limited service, unstaffed
- Station code: Amtrak: SNP

History
- Opened: 1931

Passengers
- FY 2025: 16,486 annually (Amtrak)
- FY 2026: 4 weekday boardings (Metrolink)

Services
| Preceding station | Amtrak | Following station |
|---|---|---|
| San Juan Capistrano toward San Luis Obispo | Pacific Surfliner (limited service) | Oceanside toward San Diego |
| Preceding station | Metrolink | Following station |
| San Clemente toward San Bernardino–Downtown | Inland Empire–Orange County Line (weekends) | Oceanside Terminus |
| San Clemente toward L.A. Union Station | Orange County Line (weekends) | Oceanside Terminus |
Former services
| Preceding station | Amtrak | Following station |
|---|---|---|
| San Juan Capistrano toward Los Angeles | San Diegan | Oceanside toward San Diego |
| Preceding station | Atchison, Topeka and Santa Fe Railway | Following station |
| Serra (Doheny Park) toward Los Angeles | Surf Line (1931-1940) | San Onofre toward San Diego |
Location

San Clemente Pier station is a passenger train station near the San Clemente Pier in San Clemente, California, United States. The station has limited service on the Pacific Surfliner service along with weekend-only service on Inland Empire–Orange County Line and Orange County Line of the Metrolink system.

In fiscal year 2025, 16,486 Amtrak passengers boarded or detrained at San Clemente Pier station. Of the 77 California stations served by Amtrak, San Clemente Pier was the 53rd-busiest in the 2022 fiscal year.

The station was formerly a stop of the Santa Fe Railway's San Diegan line.

== Hours and frequency ==
The station has limited service – 22 Pacific Surfliner trains per day stop at the station (11 in each direction), On weekends, the Orange County Line has 8 trains (4 in each direction) running in each direction in the morning and evening, and the Inland Empire–Orange County Line 4 trains (2 in each direction), heading towards Orange County in the morning and towards the Inland Empire in the evening.

== History ==
As the city of San Clemente became established, they sought a stop on the Atchison, Topeka and Santa Fe Railway, which passed through town. The city began construction of the station in 1930, with it opening the following year. The station building was closed around 1940 and then demolished in 1964.
