= Potrero, California =

Census-designated place in San Diego County, California, United States

Potrero
- census-designated place
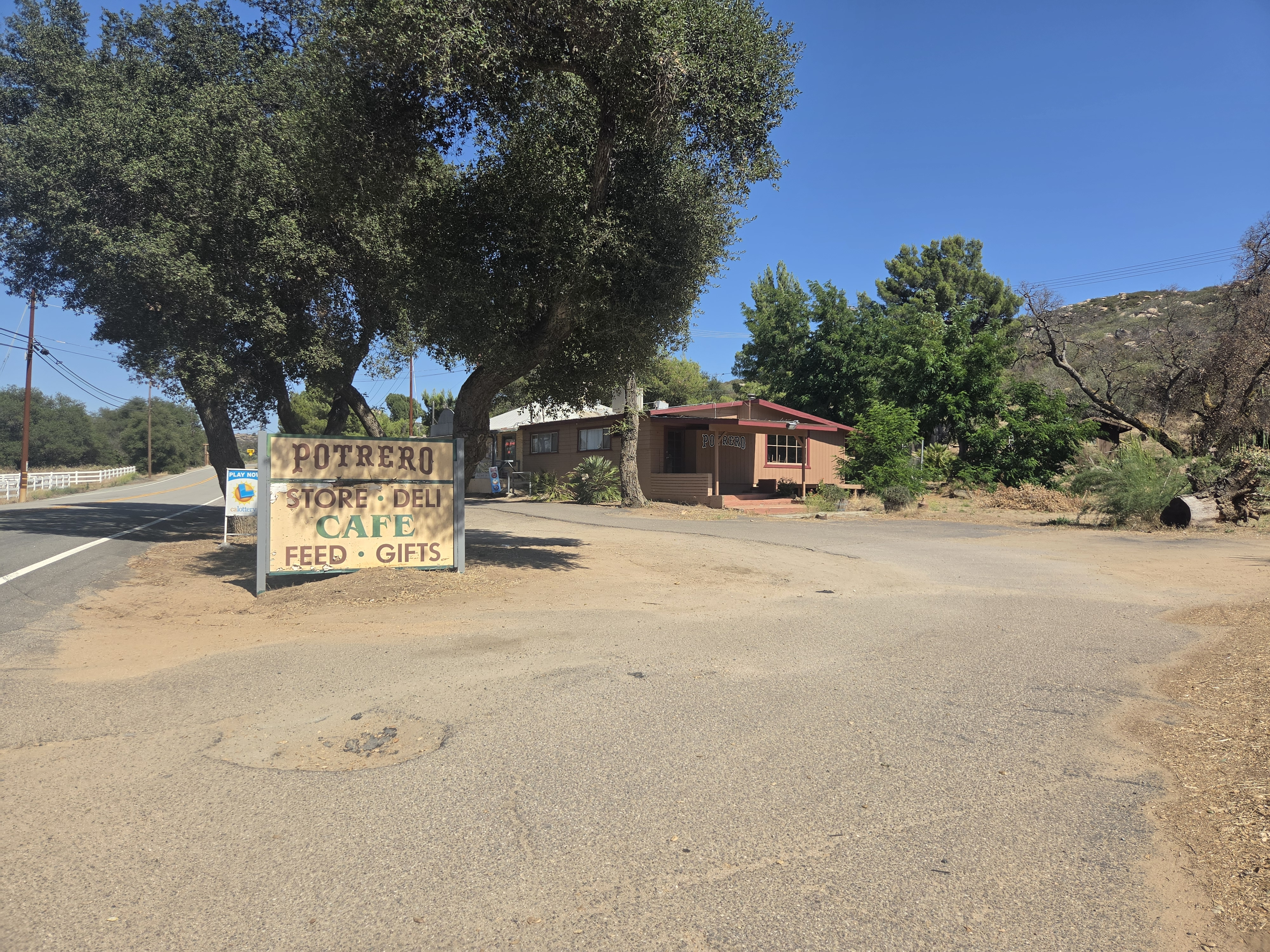
- Potrero General Store located south of California State Route 94.

- Location in San Diego County, California

- Location of Potrero in California
- Coordinates (32.6048° N, 116.6131° W): 32°36′17″N 116°36′47″W
- Country: United States
- State: California
- County: San Diego

Area
  - Total: 3.15 sq mi (8.16 km^{2})
  - Land: 3.15 sq mi (8.16 km^{2})
  - Water: 0 sq mi (0 km^{2}) 0%
- Elevation: 2,336 ft (712 m)

Population (2020)
  - Total: 648
  - Density: 206/sq mi (79.4/km^{2})
- Time zone: UTC−8 (PST)
  - Summer (DST): UTC−7 (PDT)
- ZIP Codes: 91963, 91990
- Area code: 619
- FIPS code: 06-06073
- GNIS feature ID: 247733

Potrero (Spanish for "Pasture") is a census-designated place in the Mountain Empire area of southeastern San Diego County, California. The population was 648 at the 2020 United States census, down from 656 at the 2010 census.

== Location ==
State Route 94 connects Potrero by road west to San Diego and east to Campo. Potrero is Spanish for 'pasture land'. Its closest neighbor is Tecate, Mexico.

== Geography ==
According to the United States Census Bureau, the CDP covers an area of 3.2 square miles (8.2 km^{2}), all of it land.

The area has Lathyrus splendens and Quercus engelmannii, both being rare species of plants. It is within the Tijuana watersheed, with water draining into Potrero Creek. (Note: Potrero creek is 9.3 metres (0.0093 km) long, and flows into Cottonwood Creek; it may be habitat for the bufo californicus.)

== History ==
The area which today is within the unincorporated community of Potrero was part of the area traveled by the Kumeyaay, artifacts that originate from the Kumeyaay have been found that date to at least a thousand years ago; a prehistoric archeology site was also found in the area. The area was a good source for acorns, which was a significant part of the Kumeyaay diet. The first settler was Charlie McAlmond. (Note: Born in Maine, he settled in the area after being injured at Mazatlan as a sailor, bringing Alpha (his wife who was born in Indiana), and having six kids (Edna, Charles, Agnes, Maury, Egbert, and Bertie).) A sage honey apiary existed in the community, that created honey for export; cattle and sheep raising, as well as freight hauling, were other industries of the area. Between 1888 and 1896, a trading post was established in Potrero by the owners of the Campo Gaskill store.

A road originating in Campo, came through Potrero, to Jamul was created in 1889. The road, which was used by stage coachs began to by maintained by San Diego County in 1912, and was the precursor of California State Route 94. Ranching continued in Potrero in the early 20th century. Fires came through the area in 1942, 2001 (Bell), and 2007 (Harris Fire). The Harris Fire began in Potrero. Another fire occurred in the area in 1943, and was named for the community; firefighting was largely conducted by Soldiers from Camp Lockett as well as Marines from Camp Pine Valley.

In 1990, the Los Angeles Times featured the community describing it as "The Last Resort" for those who have chemical sensitivities.

=== Blackwater controversy ===
In 2007, Blackwater USA submitted plans to build a weapons training facility in Potrero. The plans generated substantial controversy in the community.

Local activists organized a recall campaign against the members of the local planning group. On 11 December 2007, all five members of the Potrero Community Planning Group who approved the Blackwater project lost their seats in a recall election. On March 7, 2008, Blackwater USA pulled their application for this facility.

== Demographics ==
Historical population
Census	Pop.	Note	%±
2010	656		—
2020	648		−1.2%
U.S. Decennial Census; 1860–1870 1880-1890; 1900 1910 1920; 1930 1940 1950; 1960 1970 1980; 1990 2000 2010; 2020

Potrero first appeared as a census designated place in the 2010 U.S. census.

Potrero CDP, California – Racial and ethnic composition Note: the US Census treats Hispanic/Latino as an ethnic category. This table excludes Latinos from the racial categories and assigns them to a separate category. Hispanics/Latinos may be of any race.
Race / Ethnicity (NH = Non-Hispanic)	Pop 2010	Pop 2020	% 2010	% 2020
White alone (NH)	140	101	21.34%	15.59%
Black or African American alone (NH)	0	6	0.00%	0.93%
Native American or Alaska Native alone (NH)	4	2	0.61%	0.31%
Asian alone (NH)	0	0	0.00%	0.00%
Native Hawaiian or Pacific Islander alone (NH)	3	0	0.46%	0.00%
Other race alone (NH)	0	0	0.00%	0.00%
Mixed race or Multiracial (NH)	10	8	1.52%	1.23%
Hispanic or Latino (any race)	499	531	76.07%	81.94%
Total	656	648	100.00%	100.00%

The 2020 United States census reported that Potrero had a population of 648. The population density was 205.7 inhabitants per square mile (79.4/km^{2}). The racial makeup of Potrero was 191 (29.5%) White, 8 (1.2%) African American, 5 (0.8%) Native American, 0 (0.0%) Asian, 0 (0.0%) Pacific Islander, 302 (46.6%) from other races, and 142 (21.9%) from two or more races. Hispanic or Latino of any race were 531 persons (81.9%).

The whole population lived in households. There were 180 households, out of which 77 (42.8%) had children under the age of 18 living in them, 114 (63.3%) were married-couple households, 8 (4.4%) were cohabiting couple households, 30 (16.7%) had a female householder with no partner present, and 28 (15.6%) had a male householder with no partner present. 27 households (15.0%) were one person, and 15 (8.3%) were one person aged 65 or older. The average household size was 3.6. There were 141 families (78.3% of all households).

The age distribution was 213 people (32.9%) under the age of 18, 48 people (7.4%) aged 18 to 24, 200 people (30.9%) aged 25 to 44, 127 people (19.6%) aged 45 to 64, and 60 people (9.3%) who were 65 years of age or older. The median age was 30.6 years. For every 100 females, there were 97.6 males.

There were 192 housing units at an average density of 61.0 units per square mile (23.6 units/km^{2}), of which 180 (93.8%) were occupied. Of these, 95 (52.8%) were owner-occupied, and 85 (47.2%) were occupied by renters.
