= Witch Creek (San Diego County) =

River in California, United States

Witch Creek is a stream, and a tributary of Santa Ysabel Creek, in eastern San Diego County, California.

It has its source at an elevation of 3,240 feet (990 m) at 33°04′47″N 116°41′10″W, on the west face of Dye Mountain in the Cuyamaca Mountains range, and within the Cleveland National Forest.

It flows northwestward down slope to the confluence with its North fork (that also has its source on Dye Mountain), then southwest to the community of Witch Creek. It then turns northwest at an elevation of 2720 feet, falling down Witch Creek Canyon to its confluence with Santa Ysabel Creek at an elevation of 2221 feet.
