= Topanga Fire =

2005 wildfire in Southern California

Coordinates: 34.0394°N 118.5862°W

- Part of the 2005 California wildfires
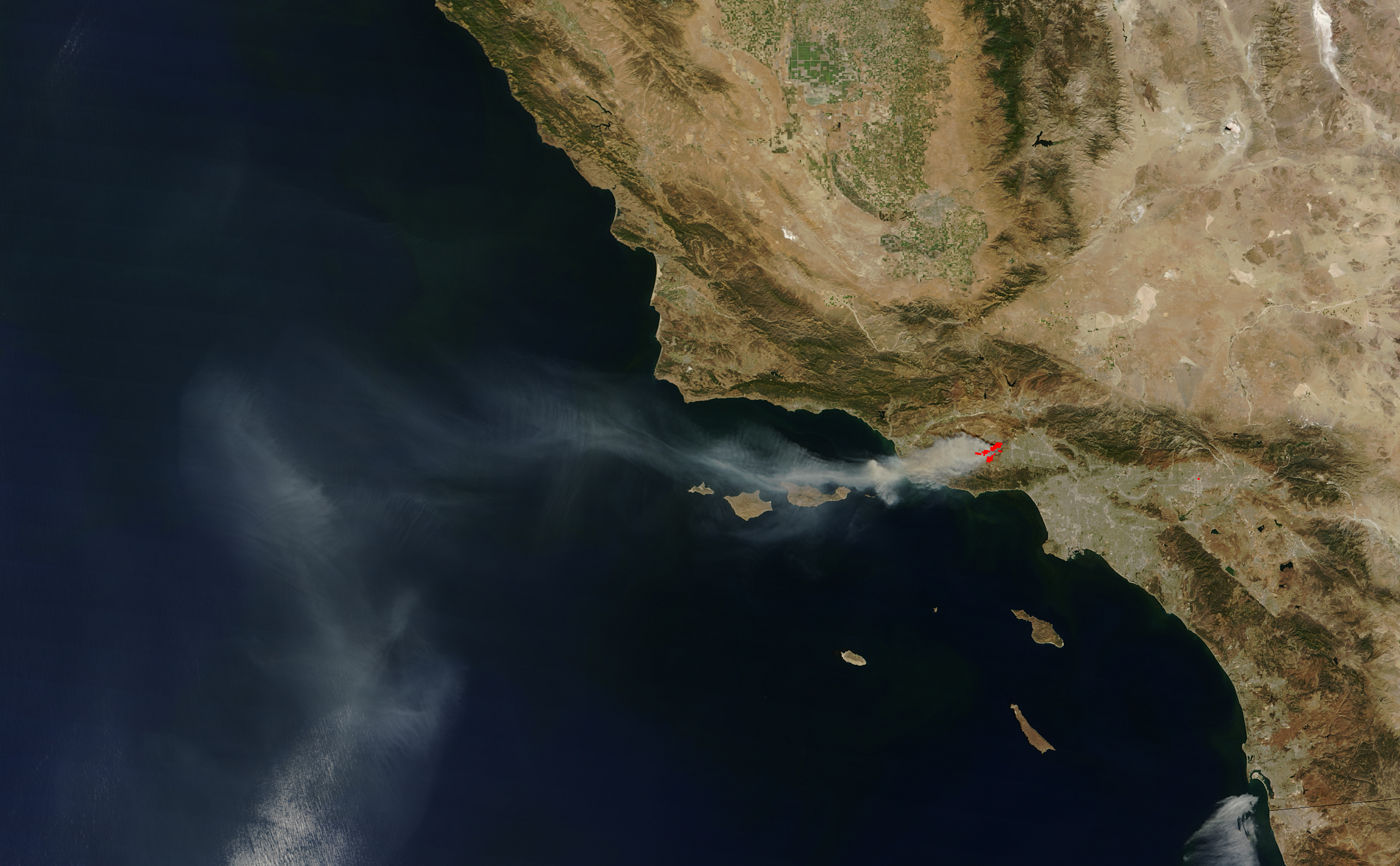
- A NASA satellite image of the Topanga Fire as seen from space, on September 29, 2005.
- Date: September 28, 2005 –; October 6, 2005
- Location: Santa Susana Mountains, Simi Hills, Southern California

Statistics
- Burned area: 24,175 acres (97.8 km^{2})

Impacts
- Injuries: 31
- Cost: $15.8 million (2005 USD)

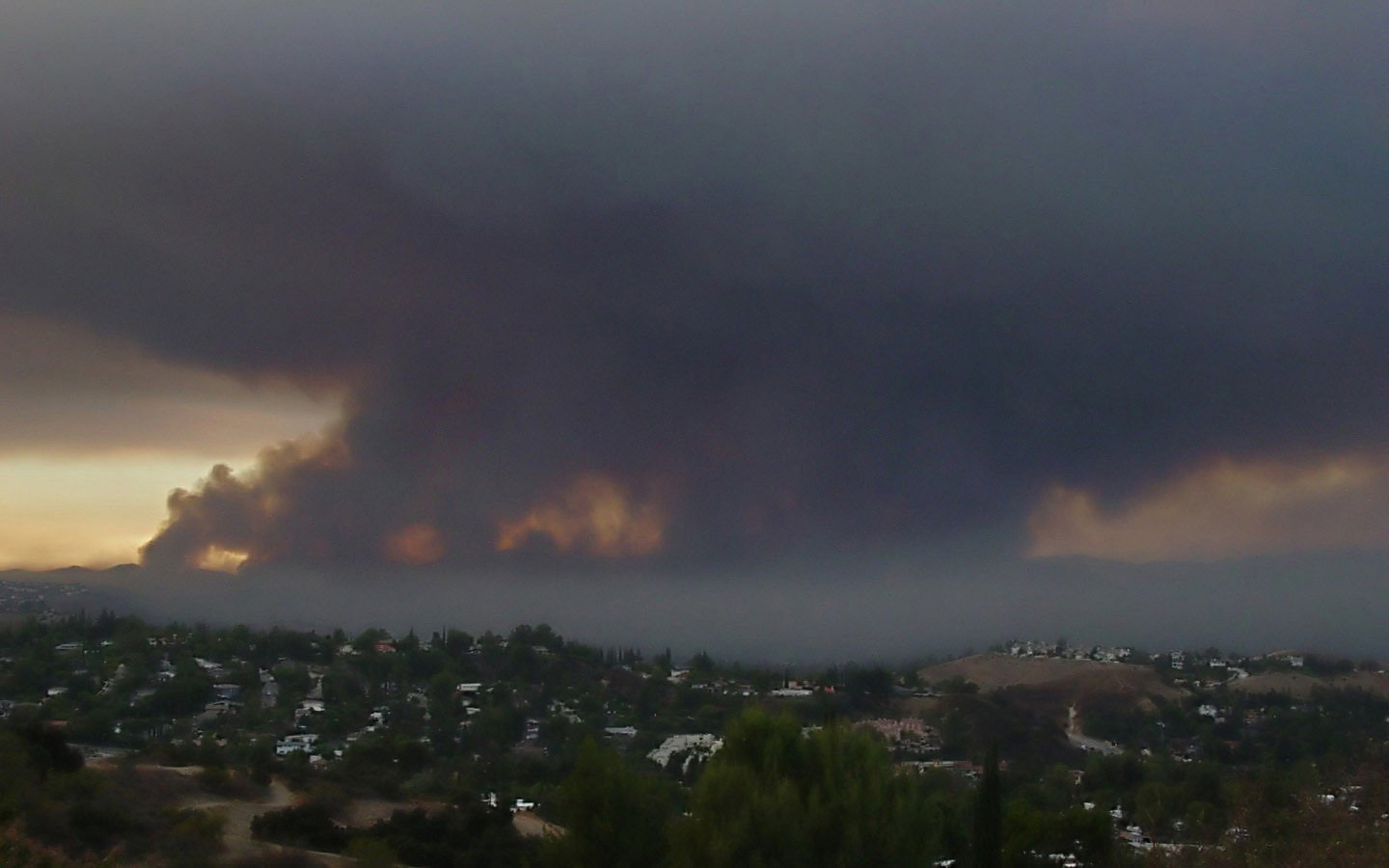
View of the wildfire from the top of the Topanga Canyon.

The Topanga Fire was a wildfire that ignited on September 28, 2005, in the Santa Susana Mountains, to the northwest of Chatsworth and the San Fernando Valley in Southern California.

== History ==
The Topanga Fire burned a total of 24,175 acres (97.8 km^{2}), injured 31 people, and cost $15.8 million to fight. The wildfire grew to more than 16,000 acres (65 km^{2}) in 2 days, threatening homes, natural resources, power lines, and communications equipment in the Simi Hills, in eastern Ventura County, as well as the Conejo Valley region north of the Santa Monica Mountains.

Experts foresaw the problem as Southern California entered the hottest part of the fire season, with the land covered in brush that grew after the heaviest rains in over 100 years. Although the wind, dry conditions, and steep terrain made the work of firefighters difficult, the loss of property had been low (as of early October); according to news reports from Friday, September 30, one home and handful of outbuildings had been lost. Mandatory evacuations were in place, involving at least 1,500 residents of the area.

On October 2, 2005, over 17,000 acres (69 km^{2}) were burned. Furthermore, only 5% of the blaze was estimated to have been contained by the approximately 3,000 firefighters battling it. On October 6, the Topanga Fire was 100% contained, after it had expanded to 24,175 acres (97.8 km^{2}).
