= Harris Fire =

2007 wildfire in Southern California

- Part of the October 2007 California wildfires
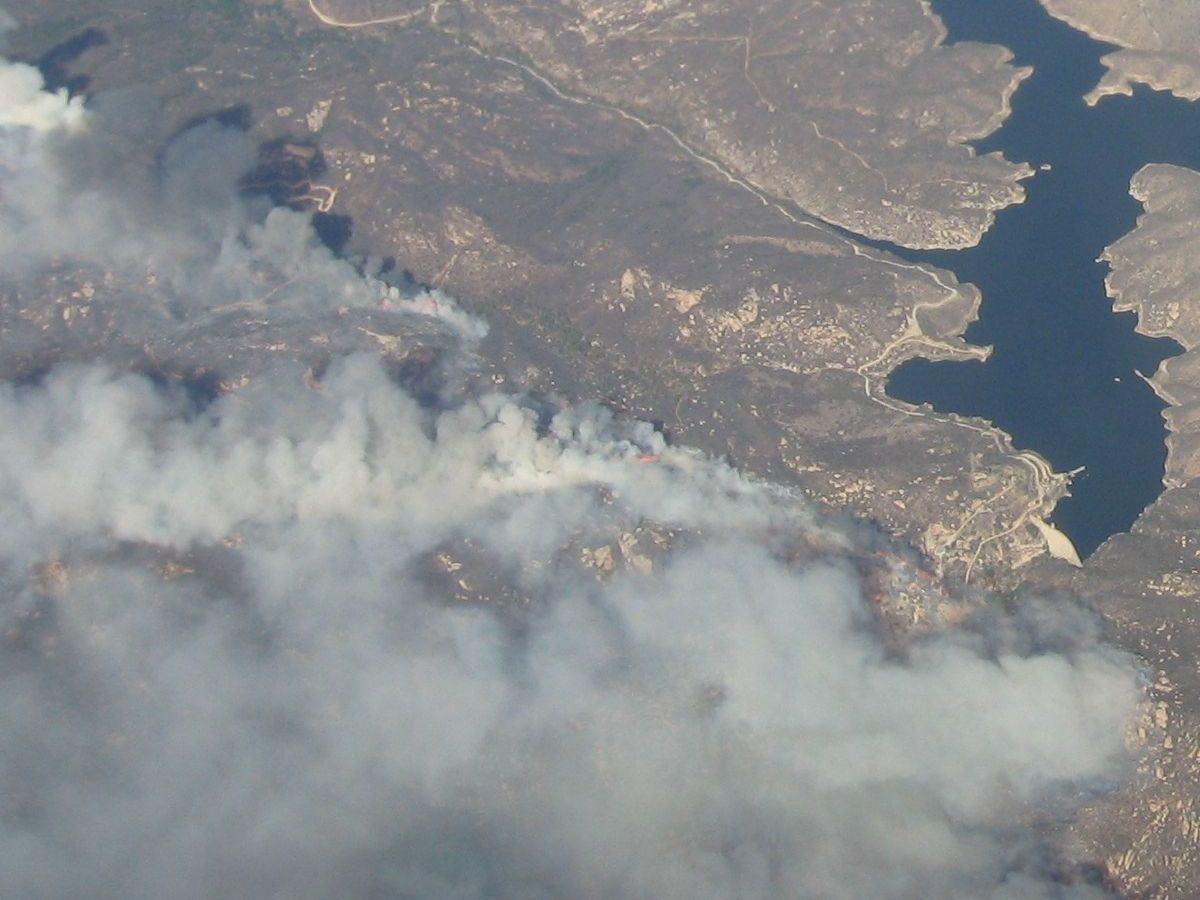
- Aerial view of the Harris Fire on October 23, 2007, at 12:05 p.m. PDT
- Date: October 21, 2007 –; November 16, 2007
- Location: Potrero, San Diego, California

Statistics
- Burned area: 90,440 acres (366 km^{2})

Impacts
- Deaths: 8 civilians
- Injuries: 21 civilians 40 firefighters
- Structures lost: 253 residential structures; 2 commercial properties; 293 outbuildings
- Cost: >$21 million (2007 USD)

Ignition
- Cause: Unknown

The Harris Fire was a major wildfire in southern San Diego County, California, that began on October 21, 2007, which burned 90,440 acres (366.0 km^{2}) before it was contained on November 5. Hotspots persisted until the fire was extinguished on November 16, making the Harris Fire the last of the October 2007 California wildfires to be extinguished. As the Harris Fire burned, it traveled in a northwest direction from its starting point at Harris Ranch Road in the town of Potrero, located in the far south of San Diego County, near Tecate, Mexico. The wildfire was the second-largest one of the October 2007 California wildfires, behind only the Witch Fire. The cause of the Harris Fire is unknown. The Harris Fire was the deadliest one of the October 2007 wildfires, killing eight people.

== The fire ==
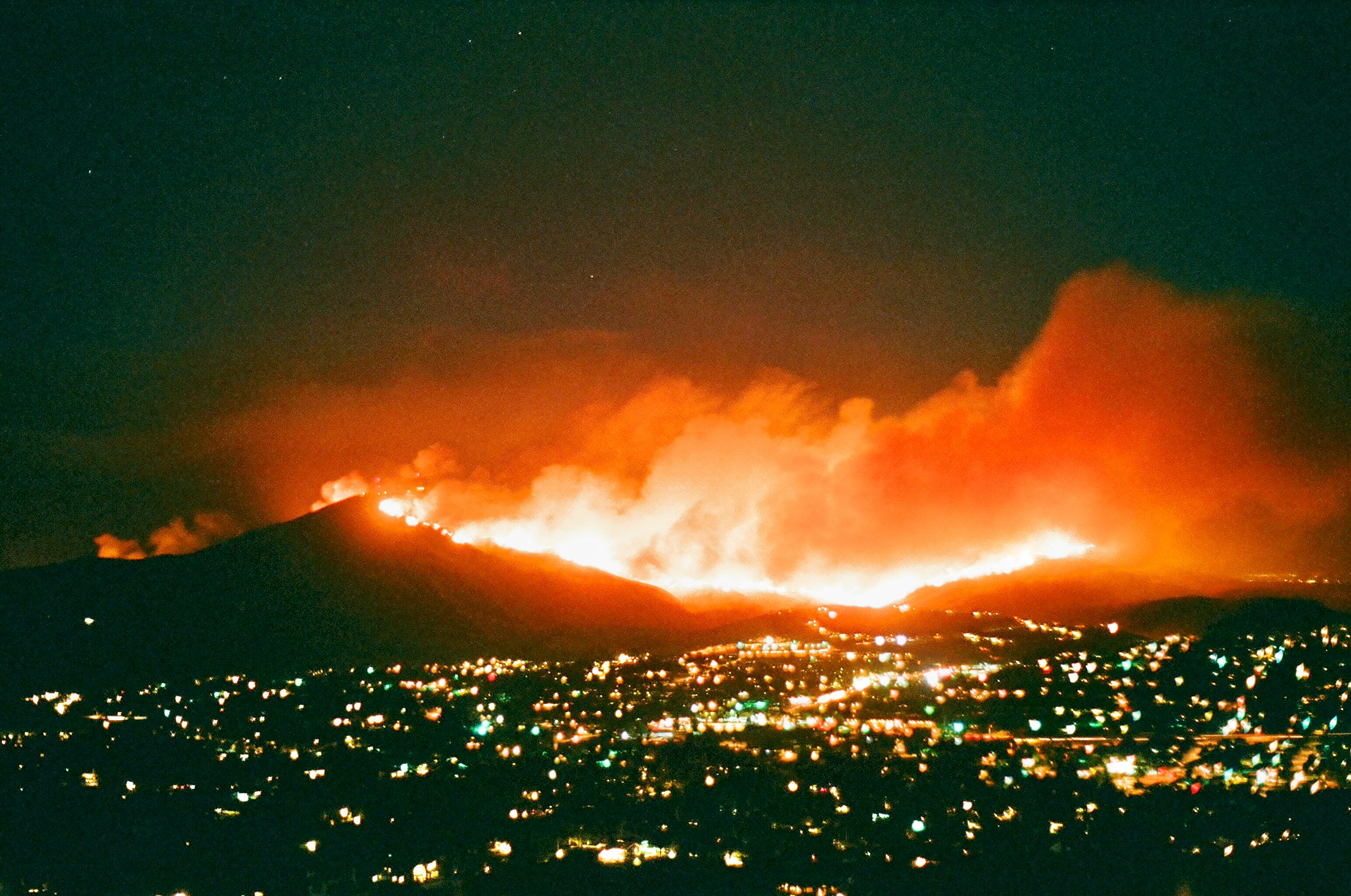
The Harris Fire burning on Mount San Miguel, on the morning of October 23, 2007

At 9:23 AM PDT on October 21, 2007, the Harris Fire ignited in Potrero, southeastern San Diego County, near the Mexican border.

On October 23, the fire approached eastern Chula Vista.

The fire resulted in the evacuation of some nearby communities, with evacuation centers set up at a nearby high school and a community center.

Thomas James Varshock, 52, of Potrero, died on his property during the Harris Fire on Sunday. His teenage son suffered burn injuries, along with four firefighters of the California Department of Forestry and Fire Protection, who had attempted to rescue them. The fire may also have led to the deaths of four illegal migrants near the U.S.–Mexico border. An estimated 1,210 firefighters battled this fire.

The Harris Fire also burned into northern Mexico, near the city of Tecate.

On November 5, 2007, the Harris Fire was 100% contained. Hotspots persisted within the perimeter of the fire until November 16, when the last hotspot was finally extinguished.

== See also ==
- December 2017 Southern California wildfires
- 2007 California wildfires
- Cedar Fire (2003)
