= San Clemente station =

Passenger train station in California, US

San Clemente
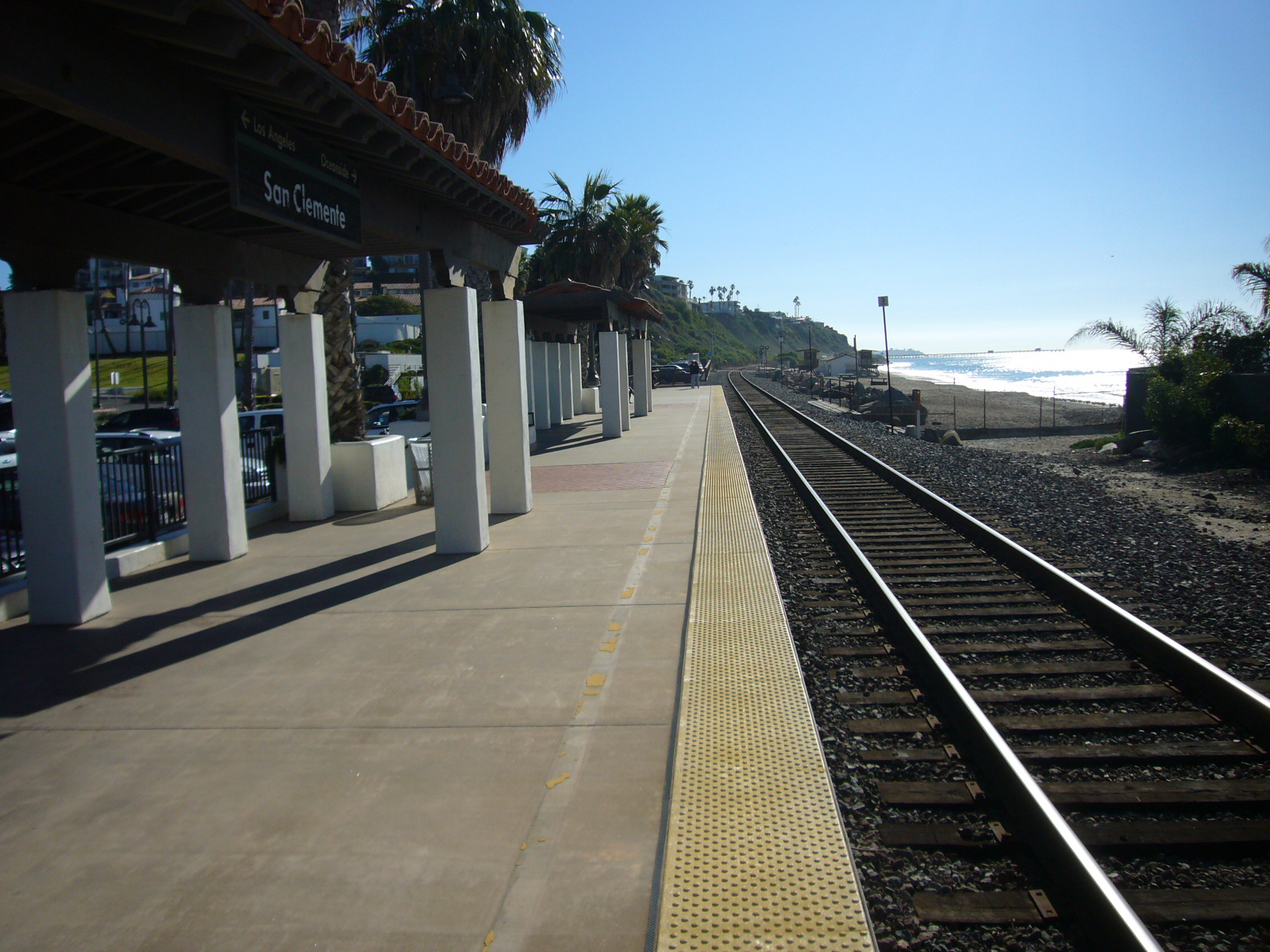
- San Clemente station platform

General information
- Location: 1850 Avenida Estacion; San Clemente, California
- Coordinates: 33.4320°N 117.6328°W
- Owner: City of San Clemente
- Line: SCRRA Orange Subdivision
- Platforms: 1 side platform
- Tracks: 1
- Connections: OC Bus: 1, 91; San Clemente Trolley: Blue, Red

Construction
- Parking: 142 spaces, 13 accessible spaces
- Cycle facilities: Racks and lockers
- Accessible: Yes

History
- Opened: March 6, 1995

Passengers
- FY 2026: 40 (avg. wkdy boardings)

Services
Preceding station	Metrolink	Following station
San Juan Capistrano toward San Bernardino–Downtown	Inland Empire–Orange County Line	Oceanside Terminus
San Juan Capistrano toward San Bernardino–Downtown	Inland Empire–Orange County Line	San Clemente Pier (weekends) toward Oceanside
San Juan Capistrano toward L.A. Union Station	Orange County Line	Oceanside Terminus
San Juan Capistrano toward L.A. Union Station	Orange County Line	San Clemente Pier (weekends) toward Oceanside
Location

San Clemente station is a station in San Clemente, California, served by the Inland Empire–Orange County and Orange County lines of the Metrolink commuter rail system. It opened on March 6, 1995 as an infill station.

== Hours and frequency ==
San Clemente station is served by 12 Metrolink Orange County Line trains (6 in each direction) each weekday, evenly spaced throughout the day. Weekend service consists of 4 trains (2 in each direction) on both Saturday and Sunday, running in each direction in the morning and evening.

Additionally, the station is served by 2 Metrolink Inland Empire–Orange County Line trains (1 in each direction) each weekday, running in each direction in the morning and evening. Weekend service consists of 4 trains (2 in each direction) on both Saturday and Sunday, heading towards Orange County in the morning and towards the Inland Empire in the evening.
