= 2005 California wildfires =

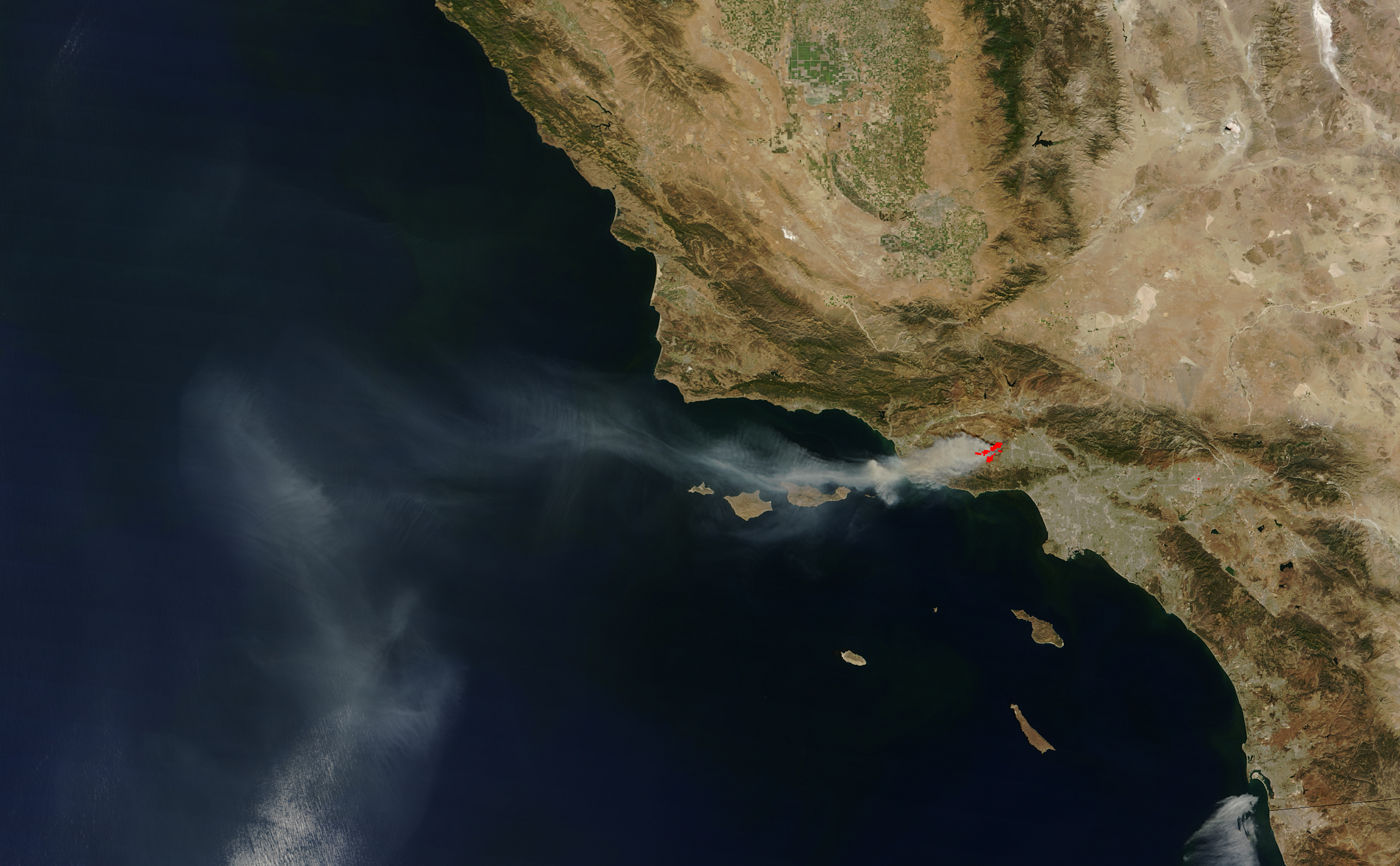
- NASA satellite image of the Topanga Fire on September 29, 2005

Statistics
- Total fires: 7,162
- Total area: 222,538 acres (900.58 km^{2})

Impacts
- Deaths: 1 civilian
- Cost: >$166.4 million (2005 USD)

7,162 wildfires burned 222,538 acres (900.58 km^{2}) of land in the US state of California in 2005.

== Background ==
The timing of "fire season" in California is variable, depending on the amount of prior winter and spring precipitation, the frequency and severity of weather such as heat waves and wind events, and moisture content in vegetation. Northern California typically sees wildfire activity between late spring and early fall, peaking in the summer with hotter and drier conditions. Occasional cold frontal passages can bring wind and lightning. The timing of fire season in Southern California is similar, peaking between late spring and fall. The severity and duration of peak activity in either part of the state is modulated in part by weather events: downslope/offshore wind events can lead to critical fire weather, while onshore flow and Pacific weather systems can bring conditions that hamper wildfire growth.

== List of wildfires ==
Below is a list of all fires that exceeded 1,000 acres (4.0 km^{2}) during the 2005 fire season. The list is taken from CAL FIRE's list of large fires.

Name	County	Acres	Km^{2}	Start date	Contained Date (Note: Containment means that fire crews have established and secured control lines around the fire's perimeter. These lines are artificial barriers, like trenches or cleared vegetation, designed to stop the fire's spread, or natural barriers like rivers. Containment reflects progress in managing the fire but does not necessarily mean the fire is starved of fuel, under control, or put out.)	Notes
Dos Amigos	Merced	1,232	5.0	June 3, 2005	June 3, 2005	
Five	Fresno	5,514	22.3	June 4, 2005	June 5, 2005	
Sperry	Stanislaus	1,330	5.4	June 4, 2005	June 4, 2005	
Pioneer	San Bernardino	1,876	7.6	June 18, 2005	June 19, 2005	
Paradise	San Bernardino	3,082	12.5	June 22, 2005	June 25, 2005	
Soboba	Riverside	2,000	8.1	June 22, 2005	June 24, 2005	
Hackberry	San Bernardino	71,000	287.3	June 22, 2005	June 27, 2005	
Bailey	Madera	1,056	4.3	July 2, 2005	July 2, 2005	
Tovey	Los Angeles	1,200	4.9	July 5, 2005	July 6, 2005	
Millwood	Tulare	2,600	10.5	July 7, 2005	July 7, 2005	
Nine	Tulare	1,150	4.7	July 9, 2005	July 9, 2005	
Tesla	Alameda	6,744	27.3	July 19, 2005	July 20, 2005	
China Lake	Kern	1,282	5.2	July 19, 2005	July 19, 2005	
Kingston	San Bernardino	3,500	14.2	July 22, 2005	July 23, 2005	
Cowpie	Merced	3,200	12.9	August 1, 2005	August 1, 2005	
Halloran	San Bernardino	1,500	6.1	August 3, 2005	August 3, 2005	1 civilian killed
Deer	Lake	1,700	6.9	August 9, 2005	August 9, 2005	
ThirtySix	Tehama	2,700	10.9	August 10, 2005	August 11, 2005	
Barrel	Modoc	24,800	100.4	August 22, 2005	August 22, 2005	
Harding	Sierra	2,270	9.2	August 24, 2005	August 24, 2005	
Manton	Tehama	1,830	7.4	August 26, 2005	August 29, 2005	
Blaisdell	Riverside	5,493	22.2	August 26, 2005	August 30, 2005	
Gorman	Kern	2,386	9.7	September 3, 2005	September 5, 2005	
Pine	Tulare	1,600	6.5	September 19, 2005	September 19, 2005	
Topanga	Los Angeles	24,175	97.8	September 28, 2005	October 7, 2005	
San Timoteo	Riverside	1,100	4.5	September 28, 2005	September 28, 2005	
Harvard	Los Angeles	1,094	4.4	September 29, 2005	October 4, 2005	
River	Madera	6,000	24.3	October 5, 2005	October 5, 2005	
Border 50	San Diego	4,103	16.6	October 5, 2005	October 8, 2005	
Woodhouse	Riverside	6,500	26.3	October 5, 2005	October 7, 2005	
School	Ventura	3,891	15.7	November 18, 2005	November 19, 2005	

== Labor Day brush fire ==
On Labor Day Monday, September 5, 2005, a small brush fire erupted and burned parts of Rancho Peñasquitos and Black Mountain Open Space Park. The wildfire quickly grew to 200 acres (0.81 km^{2}), and triggered the evacuation of 200 homes in Rancho Peñasquitos, before further growth was stopped by firefighters. The fire was fully extinguished by September 7. Despite its small size, the brush fire was the worst wildfire to affect San Diego City in two years, since the Cedar Fire of 2003. The wildfire resulted in 6 injuries, but did not result in structural damages. The brush fire determined to have been started by a teenage boy, who was subsequently arrested.
