= Santiago Fire =

2007 wildfire in Southern California

- Part of the October 2007 California wildfires
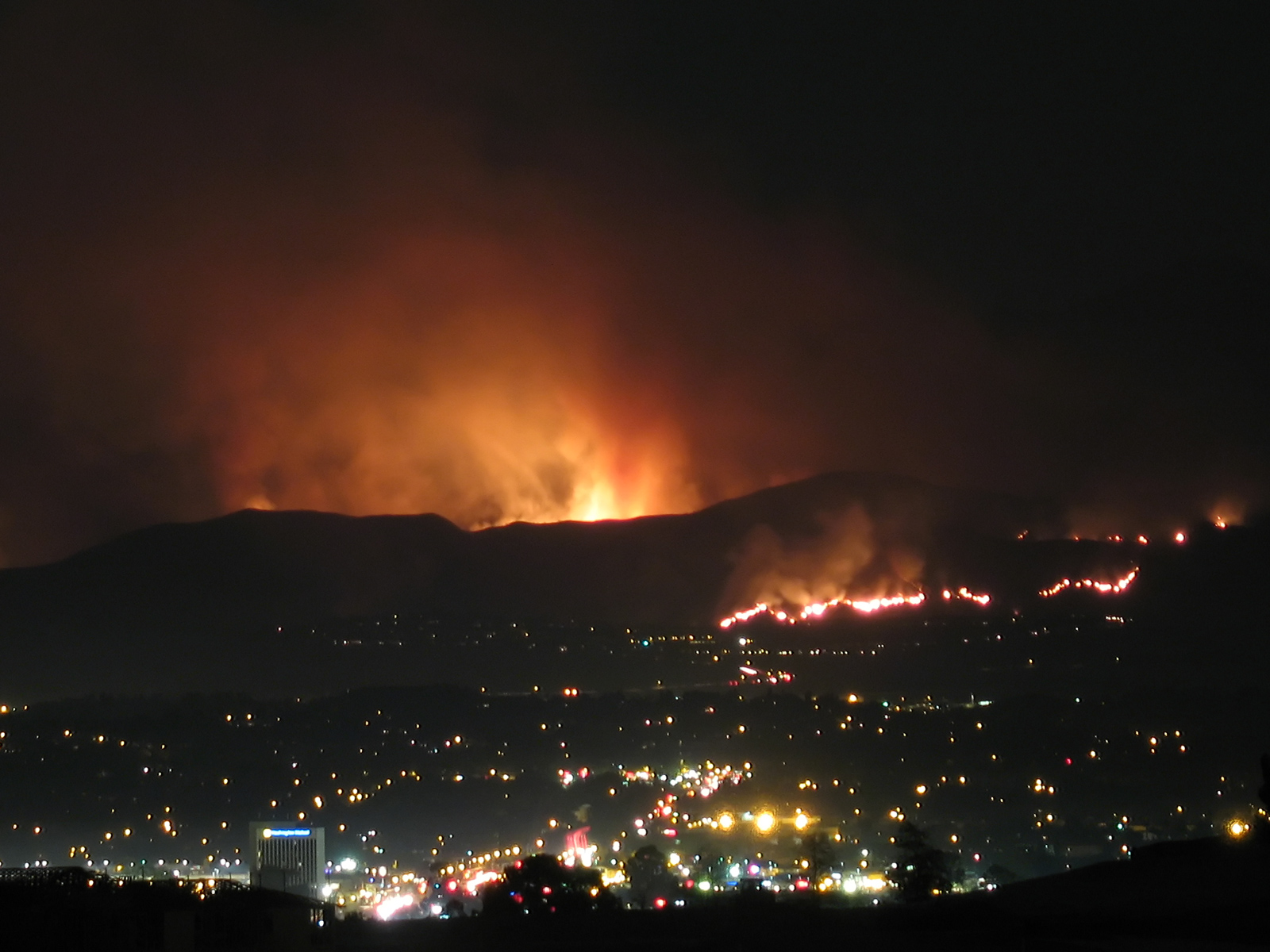
- Date: October 21, 2007 –; November 9, 2007
- Location: South Orange County, California
- Coordinates: 33°44′56″N 117°40′19″W

Statistics
- Burned area: 28,445 acres (115 km^{2})

Impacts
- Deaths: None reported
- Injuries: 16 firefighters
- Structures destroyed: 16 residential structures 9 outbuildings
- Cost: At least $21.6 million (2007 USD)

Ignition
- Cause: Arson
- Perpetrator: Arsonist

The Santiago Fire was a wildfire located near Santiago Canyon in Orange County, California, United States, and one of thirty California wildfires of October 2007. The fire was intentionally started.

== The Fire ==
The blaze originated near Santiago Canyon Road at the border of Santiago Canyon and Silverado Canyon at 5:55 p.m. on October 21, 2007, and burned approximately 28,445 acres (115 km^{2}). The flames threatened roughly 750 homes located throughout canyons in the area, including both Santiago and Silverado Canyon, Live Oak Canyon, Holy Jim Canyon, Modjeska Canyon, and Trabuco Canyon, among others. Twelve houses were destroyed in Santiago Canyon. In Foothill Ranch, the Santiago Canyon Estates, and Portola Hills, the fire reached the back yards of houses, but no homes were destroyed in those three neighborhoods.

The fire was fully contained on November 9, after reaching 28,400 acres (115 km^{2}). According to Mike Rohde, a battalion chief with the Orange County Fire Authority, controlling the fire depended solely on the wind, saying at the time, "If the wind stays normal, everything will be fine." Had it not, it would have been a "totally different story."

The fire moved into the Cleveland National Forest and crossed the path of the Santa Ana Mountains, singeing the slopes. According to the 1,100 firefighters who battled the blaze, the air conditions changed from the tumultuous Santa Ana winds to lower temperatures, more humidity, and more gentle onshore winds. The fire affected Irvine, Santiago Canyon, Silverado Canyon, Modjeska Canyon, Trabuco Canyon, Foothill Ranch, and Portola Hills.

== Response ==
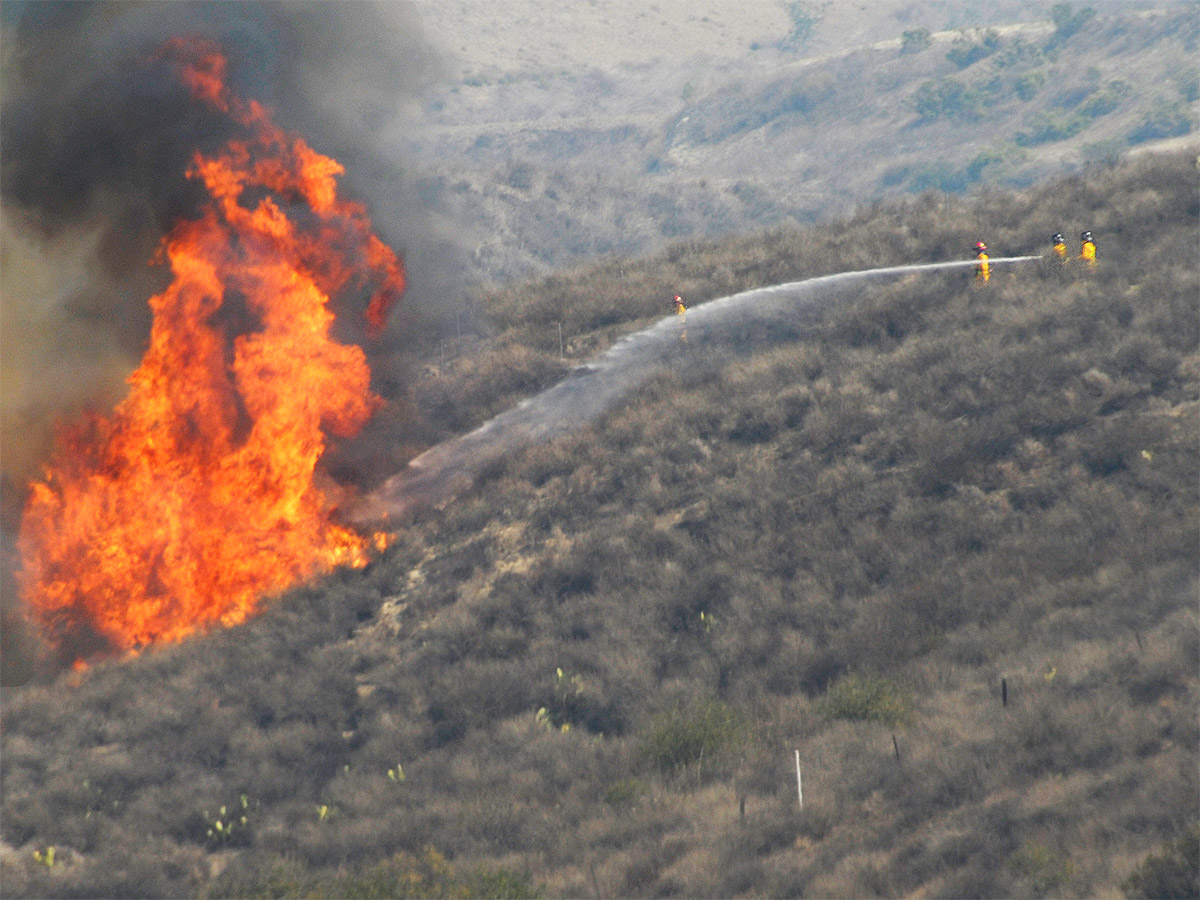
Firefighters battle the blaze

California Governor Arnold Schwarzenegger declared a state of emergency in several California counties where fires were ongoing. President George W. Bush furthered the response effort in the state by ordering federal assistance to aid with state and local efforts. The firemen were aided by units of the United States Armed Forces and United States National Guard.

A $250,000 reward is offered to anyone with information on the suspected arsonist(s), as the fire has been confirmed as being initiated by arson with two separate points of origin. According to Fire Authority Chief Chip Prather, "The person or people who did this are exceptionally lucky or they have some knowledge of when they can do the most damage when you set a fire."

== See also ==
- October 2007 California wildfires
- Corral Fire
- Holy Fire — Another fire caused by arson, also burned in the Santa Ana Mountains
- List of California wildfires
