= Castle Kashan =

- Interactive map of the Castle Kashan area
- Former names: Hodge's Castle (1978-1998)

General information
- Location: Malibu, California
- Coordinates: 34.0426°N 118.6882°W
- Year built: 1978
- Destroyed: October 21, 2007

Castle Kashan was a medieval-styled castle that was located in the hills near Malibu, California. Built in 1978, it was originally called Hodge's Castle, before being renaming to Castle Kashan by its final owner Lilly Lawrence, which was named after the city of Kashan in Iran.

The castle burned to the ground during the October 2007 California wildfires, the space was later occupied by a 80 million dollar mansion, which was completed in 2017, which was also dubbed a "castle".

== History ==
The castle was constructed in 1978 as Hodge's Castle by a doctor, Thomas Hodges. the large stone mansion was the only castle in Malibu, and sold for around $3 million in 1998 to philanthropist Lilly Lawrence. The castle featured six bedrooms, eight bathrooms, chandeliers, and many works of art. The mansion had been put for sale for around $17 million as of 2007.

The castle, filled with paintings and Elvis Presley memorabilia, was one of several homes of socialite-philanthropist Lilly Lawrence, known as “Princess Lilly.” Castle Kashan was named after the village of her father, Reza Fallah, a former Iranian oil minister under the final Shah of Iran, Mohammad Reza Pahlavi.

The castle was completely destroyed during the October 2007 California firestorm, taking all it's valuables with it. The fire had previously barely survived the Malibu Fire of October 1993.

Despite being burned down in 2007, the official website of the mansion remains up as of 2026.

== See also ==
- October 2007 California wildfires
- Topanga Fire
