= Malibu fire =

Malibu fire may refer to:

- 1978 Agoura-Malibu firestorm
- Canyon Fire, in October 2007
- The Woolsey Fire of November 2018.
- Palisades fire (2025)

== See also ==
- Malibu, California
- Category:Fires in California
- Category:Wildfires in California
