= October 2007 California wildfires =

Series of wildfires in California

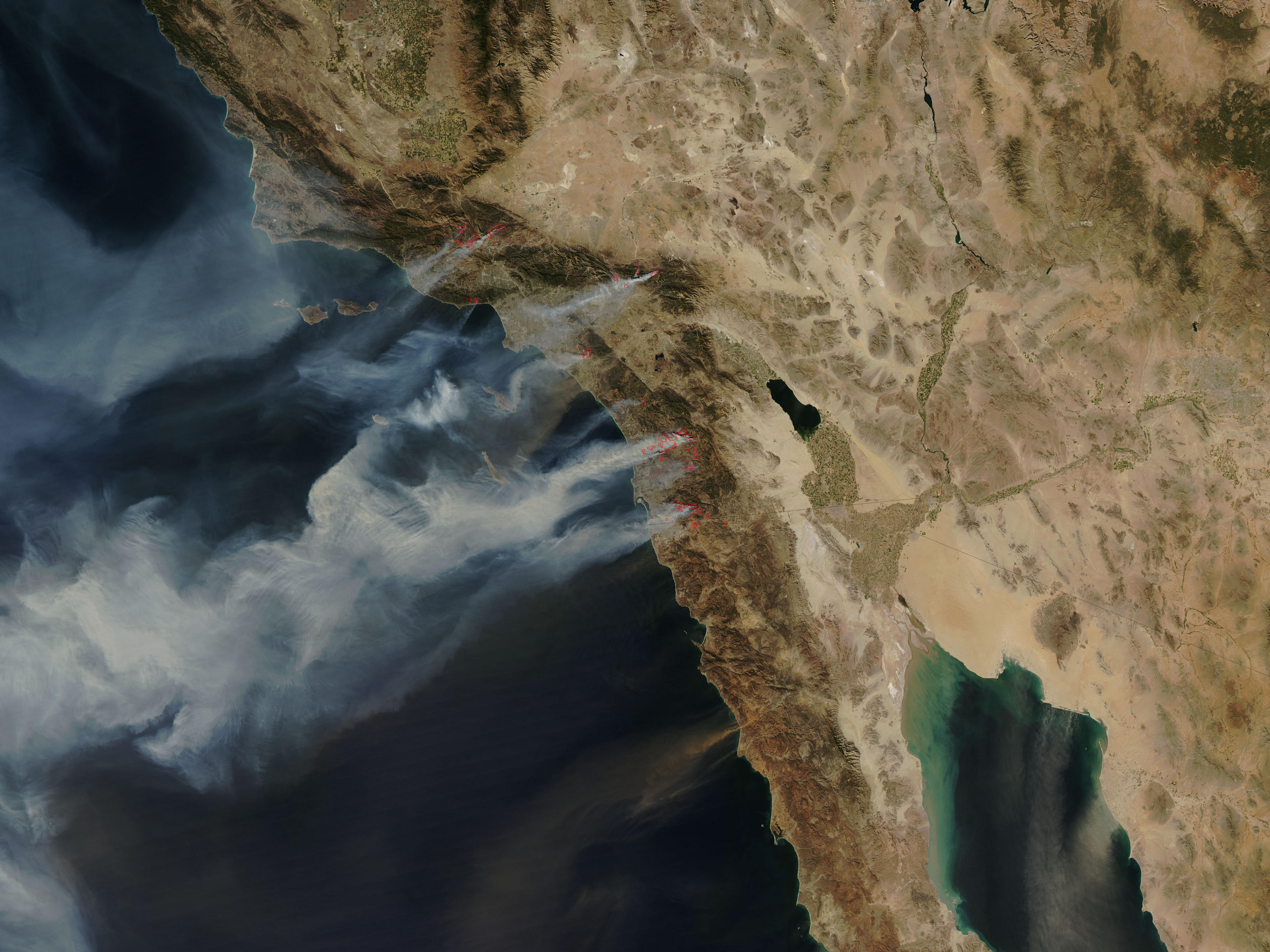
- NASA satellite photo (provided by NSPO, Taiwan National Space Organization) from October 22, 2007, showing the active fire zones and smoke plumes.
- Date: October 20, 2007 –; November 16, 2007
- Location: Southern California

Statistics
- Total fires: 30
- Burned area: 972,147 acres (3,900 km^{2})
- Land use: Mixed, residential, and wildlands

Impacts
- Deaths: 17
- Injuries: At least 160
- Structures destroyed: 3,143
- Cost: At least $2.393 billion (2007 USD)

Ignition
- Cause: Human; downed power lines; heat; vehicle fires, etc.

The October 2007 California wildfires, also known as the Fall 2007 California firestorm, were a series of about thirty wildfires (17 of which became major wildfires) that began igniting across Southern California on October 20. At least 1,500 homes were destroyed and approximately 972,147 acres (about 3,934 km^{2}, or 1,520 mi^{2}) of land was burned from Santa Barbara County to the U.S.–Mexico border, surpassing the October 2003 California wildfires in scope, which were estimated to have burned 800,000 acres (3,200 km^{2}). The wildfires killed a total of 14 people, with nine of them dying directly from the fires; 160 others were injured, including at least 124 firefighters. At their height, the raging fires were visible from space. These fires included the vast majority of the largest and deadliest wildfires of the 2007 California wildfire season. The only wildfire in 2007 that surpassed any of the individual October 2007 fires in size was the Zaca Fire.

California Governor Arnold Schwarzenegger declared a state of emergency in seven California counties where fires were burning. President George W. Bush concurred, and ordered federal aid to supplement state and local response efforts. Over 6,000 firefighters worked to fight the blazes; they were aided by units of the United States Armed Forces, United States National Guard, almost 3,000 prisoners convicted of non-violent crimes, and 60 firefighters from the Mexican cities of Tijuana and Tecate. The fires forced approximately 1,000,000 people to evacuate from their homes, becoming the largest evacuation in California's history.

Major contributing factors to the extreme fire conditions were drought in Southern California, hot weather, and unusually strong Santa Ana winds, with gusts reaching 85 mph (140 km/h). California's "fire season," which traditionally runs from June to October, has become a year-round threat, due to a mixture of perennial drought and the increasing number of homes built in canyons and on hillsides, surrounded by brush and forest.

The fires had numerous sources. Several were triggered by power lines damaged by the high winds. One fire started when a semi-truck overturned. Another was suspected to have been deliberately caused; the suspect was shot and killed in flight by state authorities. A 10-year-old boy admitted that he accidentally started the Buckweed Fire by playing with matches. The last active fire, the Harris, was fully extinguished on November 16, 2007, about 27 days after the series of wildfires had begun to ignite. The October 2007 wildfires caused over $2 billion (2007 USD) in insured property damages.

== Fires ==
This is a list of the named fires that ignited as part of the October 2007 California firestorm, beginning in late October 2007. Most of these wildfires were managed by Cal Fire at some point in time.

Name	County	Acres	Km^{2}	Start date	Contained Date	Notes
Ranch	Los Angeles	58,401	236.3	October 20, 2007	October 30, 2007	10 structures destroyed
Canyon	Los Angeles	4,521	18.3	October 21, 2007	October 27, 2007	8 structures destroyed
Sedgewick Fire	Santa Barbara	710	2.9	October 21, 2007	October 30, 2007	
Harris	San Diego	90,440	366.0	October 21, 2007	November 5, 2007	472 structures destroyed, 8 civilian fatalities
October Fire	Los Angeles	35	0.1	October 21, 2007	October 30, 2007	
Nightsky Fire	Ventura	20	0.1	October 21, 2007	November 1, 2007	
Witch	San Diego	197,990	801.2	October 21, 2007	November 6, 2007	1,650 structures destroyed, 2 civilian fatalities
McCoy Fire (Note: These wildfires merged into the Witch Fire.)	San Diego	400	1.6	October 21, 2007	October 26, 2007	1 structure destroyed
Buckweed	Los Angeles	38,356	155.2	October 21, 2007	November 1, 2007	63 structures destroyed
Roca Fire	Riverside	270	1.1	October 21, 2007	November 1, 2007	
Santiago	Orange	28,400	114.9	October 21, 2007	November 9, 2007	24 structures destroyed
Coronado Hills Fire	San Diego	250	1.0	October 22, 2007	October 30, 2007	
Little Mountain Fire	San Bernardino	650	2.6	October 22, 2007	October 24, 2007	
Walker Fire	San Bernardino	160	0.6	October 22, 2007	October 30, 2007	
Cajon Fire	San Bernardino	250	1.0	October 22, 2007	October 30, 2007	
Magic	Los Angeles	2,824	11.4	October 22, 2007	October 27, 2007	
Slide	San Bernardino	12,759	51.6	October 22, 2007	October 31, 2007	272 structures destroyed
Rice	San Diego	9,472	38.3	October 22, 2007	November 1, 2007	248 structures destroyed
Grass Valley	San Bernardino	1,247	5.0	October 22, 2007	October 29, 2007	178 structures destroyed
Rosa Fire	Riverside	411	1.7	October 22, 2007	October 31, 2007	
San Martin Fire	San Bernardino	123	0.5	October 23, 2007	October 30, 2007	
Meadowridge Fire	Los Angeles	58,401	236.3	October 23, 2007	October 30, 2007	
Poomacha	San Diego	49,410	200.0	October 23, 2007	November 13, 2007	217 structures destroyed
Ammo (Horno) Fire	San Diego	21,004	85.0	October 23, 2007	October 29, 2007	
Wilcox Fire	San Diego	100	0.4	October 23, 2007	October 26, 2007	
Wildomar Fire	Riverside	20	0.1	October 24, 2007	October 24, 2007	

== Counties ==
=== San Diego County ===
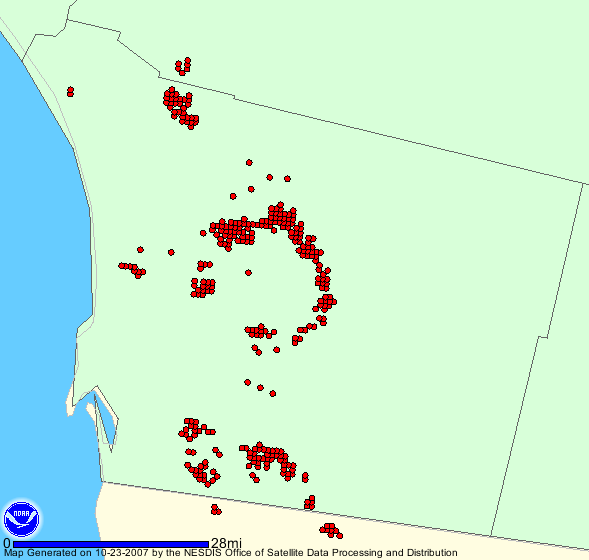
NOAA hot spot map of San Diego County, October 23, 2007.

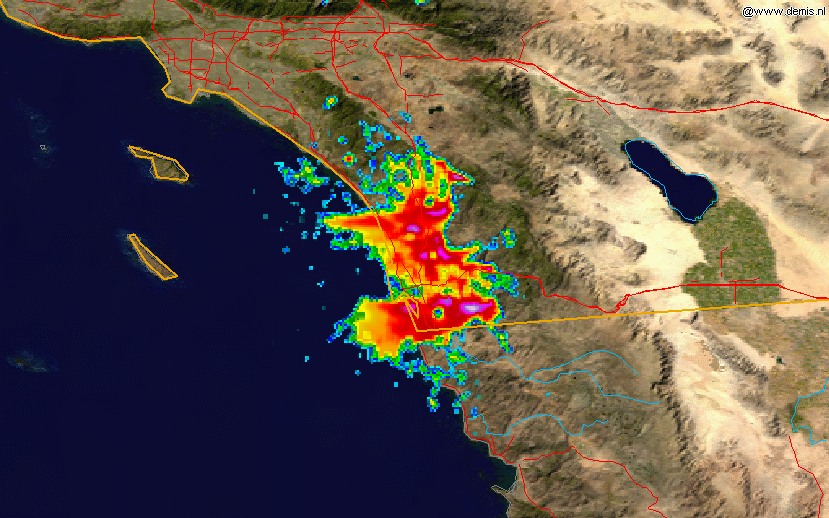
Weather radar imagery of the fires on October 23.

Of all the wildfires, the two largest ones were located in San Diego County. The largest, the Witch Creek Fire, burned areas in north and northeast San Diego County. The second largest, the Harris Fire, burned northwest from the U.S–Mexico border towards San Diego. Officials feared that the fires could become even more destructive than the 2003 Cedar Fire that burned 280,278 acres (1,134.2 km^{2}), destroyed 2,820 buildings (including 2,232 homes), and killed 15 people (including one firefighter) before being contained on November 3, 2003. Although individually the fires did not surpass the Cedar Fire, if they had combined as one, they would have.

Residents were subjected to a mix of mandatory and voluntary evacuations, depending on the projected path of a fire. Hundreds of thousands of residents were notified of evacuations via a computerized Reverse 911 phone call system. While this alert system was mostly effective, many residents in Rancho Bernardo received the calls after they had been driven from their homes. On the other hand, in Carmel Valley, only the northern half was officially evacuated, but a computer error mistakenly sent Reverse 911 calls to the southern half as well. Law enforcement officers also notified residents by driving through evacuation areas. On October 24, 2007, San Diego County Sheriff Bill Kolender stated that the number of people evacuated in San Diego county exceeded the number evacuated from New Orleans, Louisiana during Hurricane Katrina.

Two days into the fires, approximately 500,000 people from at least 346,000 homes were under mandatory orders to evacuate, the largest evacuation in the region's history. Evacuation sites included Qualcomm Stadium, as well as many schools, civic centers, and churches throughout the area. The American Red Cross managed the evacuation centers.

Officials estimated that 12,000 gathered at Qualcomm stadium. Volunteers provided food, blankets, water, internet services, children's toys, massages, and a live rock band performance for those at the stadium. Nearly all public schools and universities in the San Diego area were closed. Many businesses closed as well. To ensure clear roads for emergency vehicles, San Diego mayor Jerry Sanders asked residents to stay home and inside.

By October 23, some evacuations were lifted, allowing about 50,000 residents from the cities of Del Mar, Chula Vista, and Poway, and the San Diego neighborhoods of Del Mar Heights and Scripps Ranch to return home. On October 24, more evacuation orders for parts of Rancho Bernardo and other areas further west were lifted. However, the fires continued and damage was severe. The four major fires across San Diego County burned over 368,000 acres (1,490 km^{2}) and destroyed or damaged 1,350 homes and 100 businesses since October 21, 2007.

Many major roads were closed as a result of fires and smoke. On October 22, the California Highway Patrol closed Interstate 15 in both directions between State Routes 78 and 56. On October 24, 2007, the Ammo (Horno) Fire forced the closure of Interstate 5 as well as the Amtrak California Surfliner service between Oceanside and San Clemente. Traffic from Interstate 5 was diverted to Interstate 15, which had reopened.

Officials from the San Diego Wild Animal Park said that its more than 3,500 animals were safe staying in their enclosures where they were protected by the park's fire break and irrigated areas. If the weather conditions worsened, the animals could retreat to their watering holes. However, many critically endangered animals such as the California condor were moved to the park's veterinary hospital, which is fire-resistant and fully equipped with sprinklers. Park spokesperson Yadira Galindo said that the animals were "alert but not showing any concerned behavior."

Fire data was provided by the California Department of Forestry & Fire Protection and independent news media. As of November 2007: the following fires burned in San Diego County:

San Diego County
Fire name	Date / time started	Area burned	Structures destroyed	Injuries	Containment Date
Witch (Creek)	October 21 at 11:00 a.m.	197,990 acres (801 km^{2})	1,125 homes 509 outbuildings 239 vehicles 77 homes damaged 25 outbuildings damaged	2 deaths 40 firefighters 2 civilians	November 6
Harris	October 21 at 9:23 a.m.	90,440 acres (366 km^{2})	206 homes 293 outbuildings 253 homes 2 commercial properties 12 homes damaged 3 outbuildings damaged	5 deaths 40 firefighters 21 civilians	
Poomacha (Palomar Mountain/Valley Center)	October 23 at 3:13 p.m.	50,176 acres (203.06 km^{2})	143 homes 77 outbuildings	21 firefighters	
Horno/Ammo	October 23 at 9:20 p.m.	21,084 acres (85.32 km^{2}) (Ammo Fire); 6,000 acres (24.28 km^{2}) (Horno Fire)		6 firefighters	
Rice	October 22 at 4:16 p.m.	9,472 acres (38.3 km^{2})	206 homes 2 commercial properties 40 outbuildings	5 firefighters	
McCoy	October 21	400 acres (1.62 km^{2})	1 residence 1 outbuilding		
Coronado Hills	October 22 at 1:50 a.m.	250 acres (1.01 km^{2})	2 outbuildings		October 22
Wilcox	October 23	100 acres (0.40 km^{2})			

==== Witch Creek Fire ====
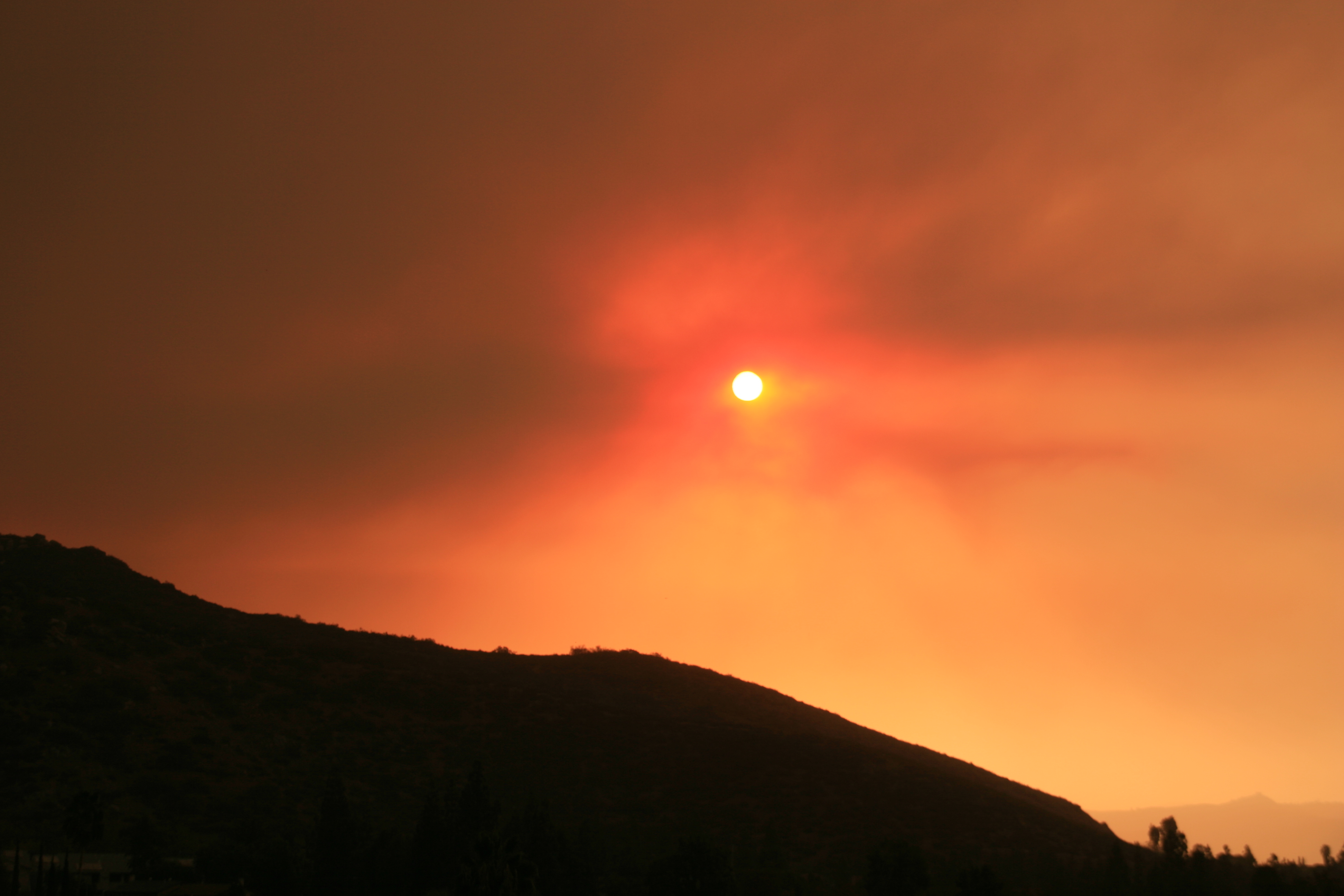
Smoke filling the sky at sunrise, on October 22, 2007.

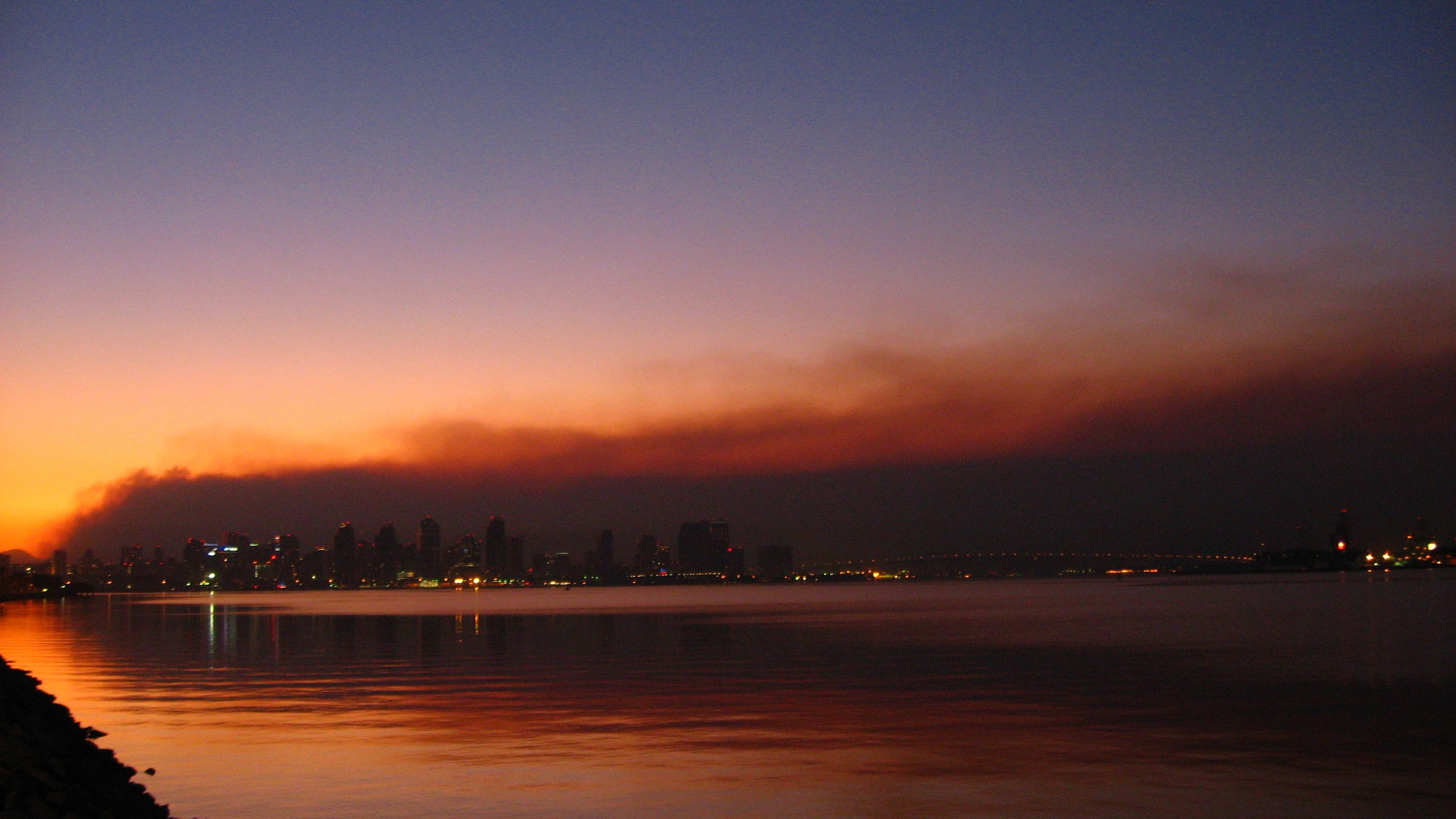
San Diego skyline against the smoke at sunrise, on October 23, 2007.

The Witch Creek Fire was the largest of the October 2007 wildfires and surpassed the 1970 Laguna Fire as the third-largest fire in California history. Hundreds of thousands of residents were informed of evacuations through the Reverse 911 system. This evacuation came almost four years to the day after the Cedar Fire of 2003.

The fire started in Witch Creek Canyon near Santa Ysabel, and quickly spread to San Diego Country Estates, Ramona, Rancho Bernardo, Poway and Escondido. Locals in the San Pasqual Valley area reported wind gusts of over 100 mph (160 km/h). From there the fire jumped over Interstate 15 and continued west, causing significant damage in Lake Hodges, Del Dios, and Rancho Santa Fe.

Strong Santa Ana winds pushed the fires west towards the coast. San Diego County Sheriff William B. Kolendar stated that the Witch Creek Fire could be "well in excess of the Cedar Fire of 2003". While many coastal communities were evacuated as the fire moved west, the shifting winds prevented it from directly threatening those areas. During the duration of the Witch Fire, fire officials reported 80–100 feet-high flames within the wildfire.

On the morning of October 22, at 5:22 AM PDT, residents located between the Del Dios Highway and State Route 56 were ordered to evacuate. By 9:30 P.M. PDT on October 22, a dispatch from the city of Del Mar's web site stated: "For your safety, we are strongly advising that all Del Mar residents evacuate." Evacuations were also ordered for Scripps Ranch neighborhood, specifically "Everything south of Scripps Poway Parkway, north of MCAS Miramar, east of Interstate 15, and west of Highway 67". The Mesa Grande Indian Reservation was evacuated due to the Witch Fire. Residents of the Barona Indian Reservation were advised to leave, though the evacuation was not mandatory. The casino on the reservation was closed. At approximately 01:00 UTC on October 23 (6:00 PM PDT on October 22), fire broke out near Wildcat Canyon to the south of Barona, where many houses were destroyed and lives lost in the Cedar Fire. Residents of Wildcat Canyon and Muth Valley were ordered to evacuate, and the road was closed. During the late afternoon of October 23, the evacuations for Del Mar, Chula Vista, Poway, Del Mar Heights, and Scripps Ranch were lifted for many residents. At 9:50 P.M. PDT on October 23, 2007, the town of Julian, California was ordered to evacuate. Due to the fires, there was no power or phone service in the town.

Evacuation sites in San Diego County included Qualcomm Stadium, Escondido High School, Mission Hills High School, Poway High School, Mira Mesa Senior High School, and the Del Mar Fairgrounds.

Many major roads were also closed as a result of the fires and smoke. On October 22, the California Highway Patrol closed Interstate 15 in both directions between State Routes 78 and 56. On October 24, 2007, the Ammo (Horno) Fire forced the closure of Interstate 5, as well as the Amtrak California Surfliner service between Oceanside and San Clemente. Traffic from Interstate 5 was being diverted to Interstate 15, which had reopened. 1,841 firefighters were assigned to the fire.

On Wednesday, October 24, 2007, some of the evacuation orders in place for Rancho Bernardo, Rancho Peñasquitos, 4S Ranch, and other areas west of Rancho Bernardo were lifted, after the western part of the Witch Creek Fire had been extinguished. However, the evacuation orders in place for eastern and northern Rancho Bernardo, around Lake Hodges, were still in place. On October 25, more of the evacuation orders for the Witch Fire around Rancho Bernardo were lifted, as the Witch Creek Fire became 45% contained. Late on October 24, after the winds had reversed, the Witch Fire began approaching the nearby Poomacha Fire to the north, which was burning near Palomar Mountain, with firefighters and officials fearing that the two wildfires would soon merge. On October 25, the Witch Fire and the Poomacha Fire merged into one gigantic complex fire, with the two wildfires joining to the south of Palomar Mountain. On October 26, the Witch Fire also merged with the contained McCoy Fire, which had previously burned 400 acres in the Pine Hills area, in eastern San Diego County.

==== Harris Fire ====
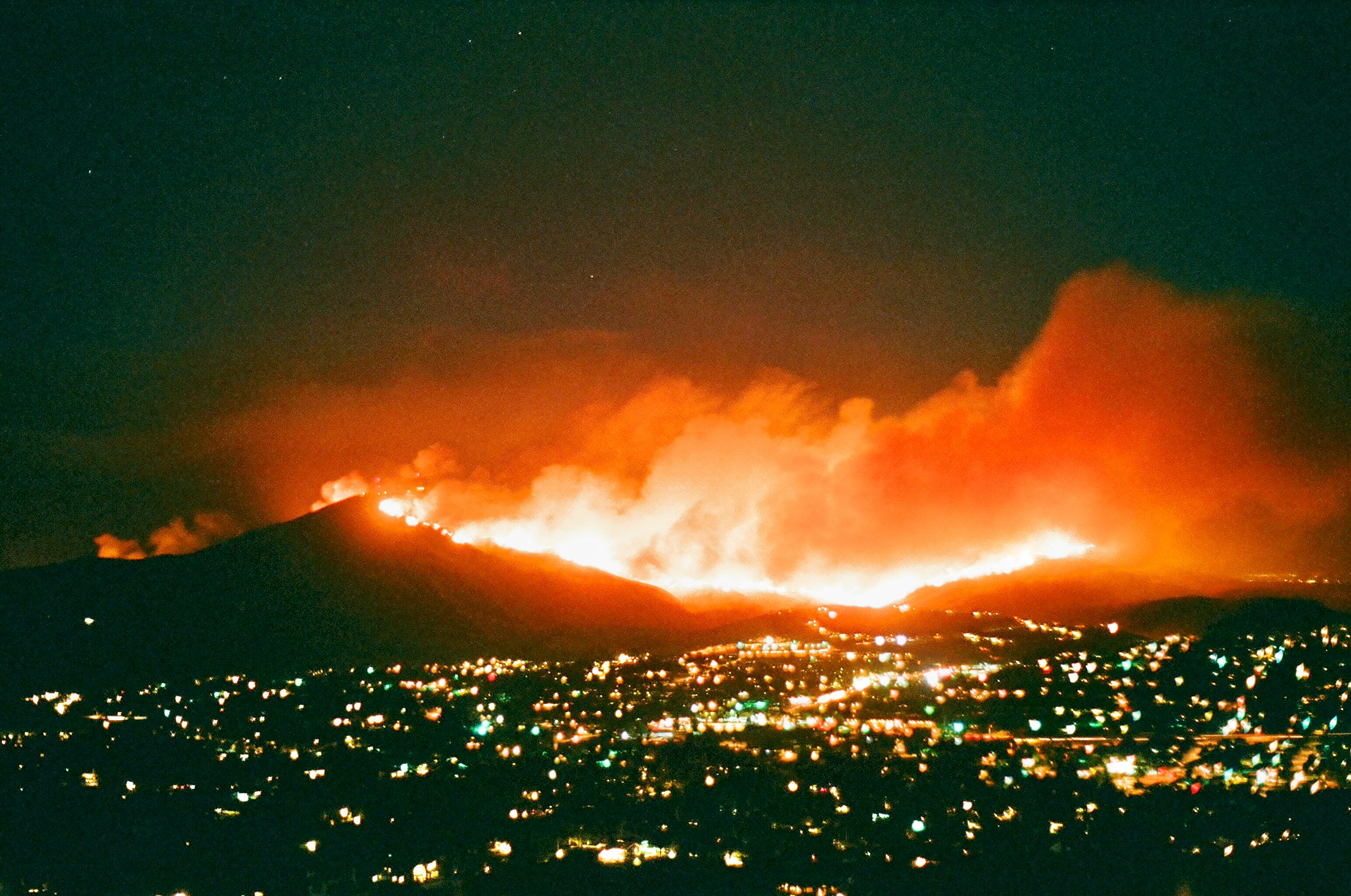
The Harris Fire burning on Mount San Miguel, on the morning of October 23, 2007

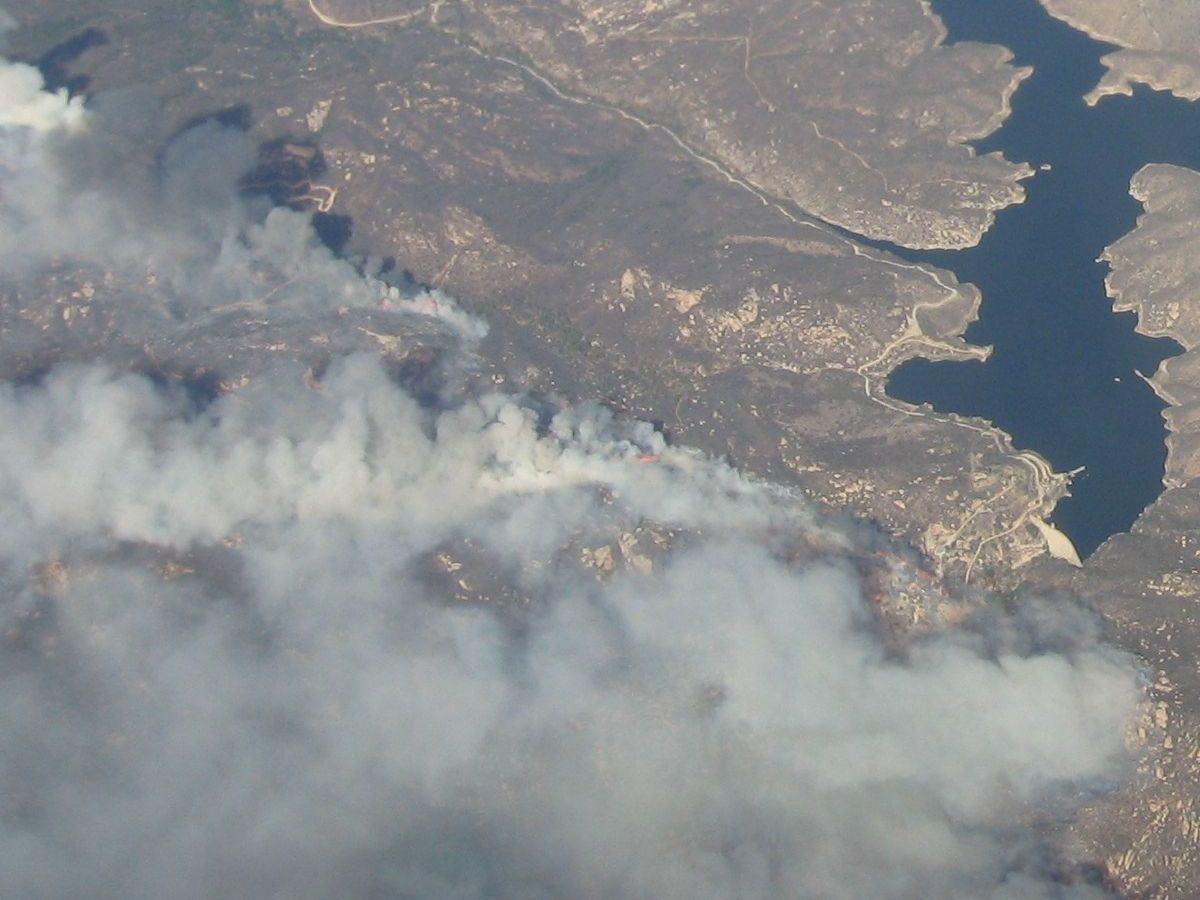
Aerial view of the Harris Fire on October 23, 2007, 12:05 pm.

The Harris Fire burned in a northwest direction from its starting point at Harris Ranch Road in the town of Potrero, in the far south of San Diego County, a few miles north of Tecate, Mexico. On October 23, the fire approached eastern Chula Vista.

Many communities were evacuated, with evacuation centers set up at a nearby high school and community center.

Thomas James Varshock, 52, of Potrero, died on his property during the Harris Fire on Sunday. His teenage son suffered burn injuries, along with four firefighters of the California Department of Forestry and Fire Protection, who had attempted to rescue them. The fire may also have caused the deaths of four migrant workers near the U.S.–Mexico border. An estimated 1,210 firefighters battled this fire.

The Harris Fire also burned into northern Mexico, near the town of Tecate.

On November 5, the Harris Fire was 100% contained. However, hotspots continued to burn within the perimeter of the Harris Fire until November 16, when the last hotspot was finally extinguished.

==== Other fires ====
- Marine Corps Base Camp Pendleton Fires:
  - The Wilcox Fire began at Santa Margarita/33 Area behind Marine Corps Air Station Camp Pendleton.
  - The Ammo Fire was located near the Las Pulgas/43 Area and Basilone Road.
  - The Horno Fire burned 21,084 acres (85 km^{2}), and was located in the Basilone Road and Canyon Road/Las Flores/41 Area.

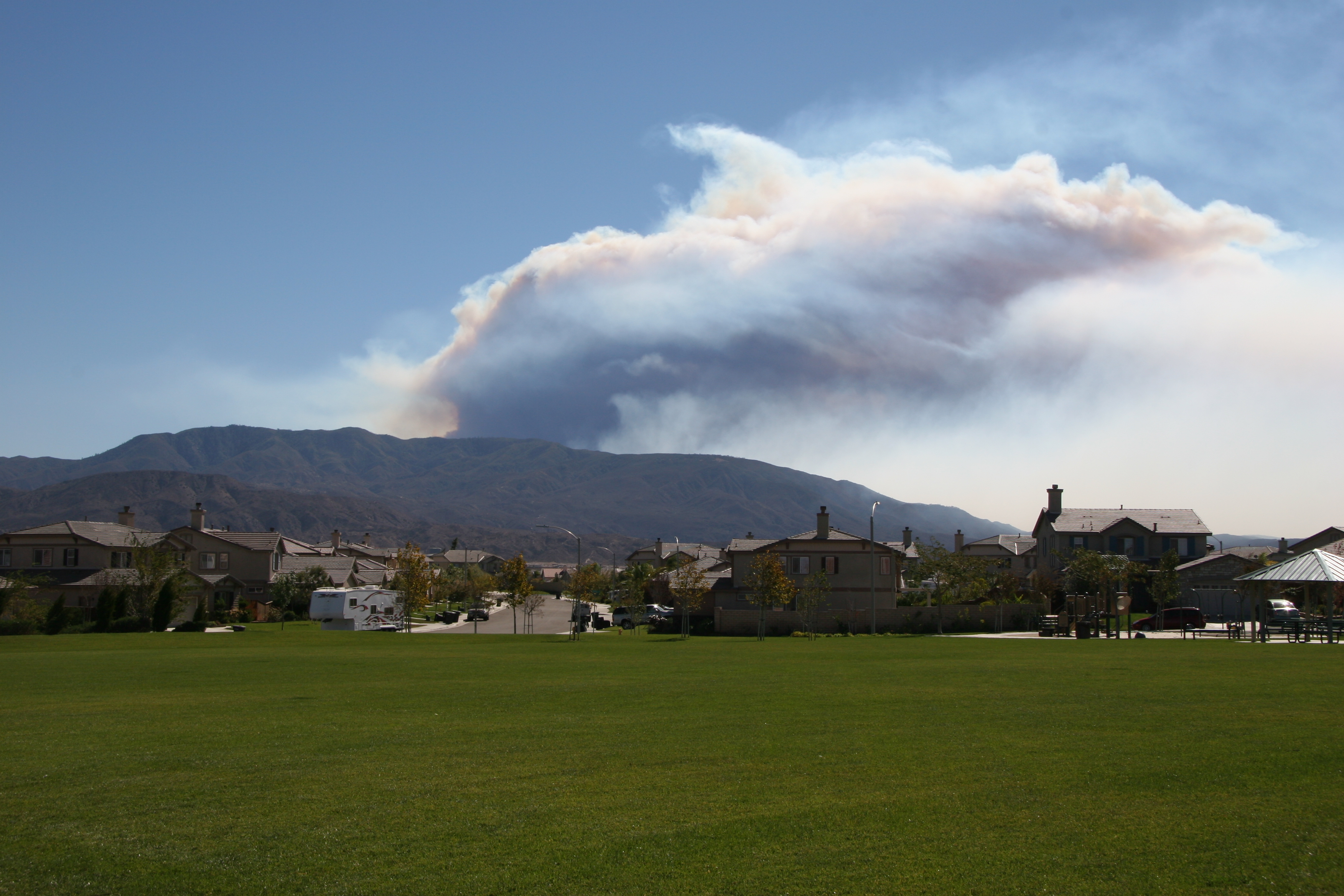
The Poomacha Fire: photo taken looking South towards San Diego from Temecula

- The Poomacha Fire (or Mt. Palomar Fire) began as a structure fire on the La Jolla Indian Reservation, then established itself on Palomar Mountain, merged with the Witch Fire on October 25, and entered the Agua Tibia Wilderness. Because of steep terrain, it continued to burn after all other October 2007 fires were put out, before finally reaching full containment on November 13, 2007.

- The Rice Canyon Fire started in the early morning of October 22, in the Rice Canyon near Fallbrook. It caused massive evacuations and the closure of Interstate 15.

- The Rice Canyon Fire was caused by downed power lines.

- The Coronado Hills Fire started near San Marcos, and burned south of Cal State San Marcos.

- On October 23, The San Diego Union-Tribune reported on the El Capitan Fire: "A small brush fire that burned today around El Capitan Reservoir north of Alpine is out, Cal Fire officials said about 9:30 p.m. Officials said the blaze consumed the vegetation near the reservoir and ran out of fuel."

- The McCoy Fire started on October 21, at the Cleveland National Forest, near the intersection of the Eagle Peak and Boulder Creek roads, west of Rancho Cuyamaca State Park. It burned 400 acres (1.6 km^{2}) and destroyed at least one structure in Pine Hills. Although the McCoy Fire was contained on October 23, the McCoy Fire eventually merged into the still-expanding Witch Creek Fire on October 26, shortly before the smaller fire was fully brought under control.

=== Los Angeles and Ventura counties ===
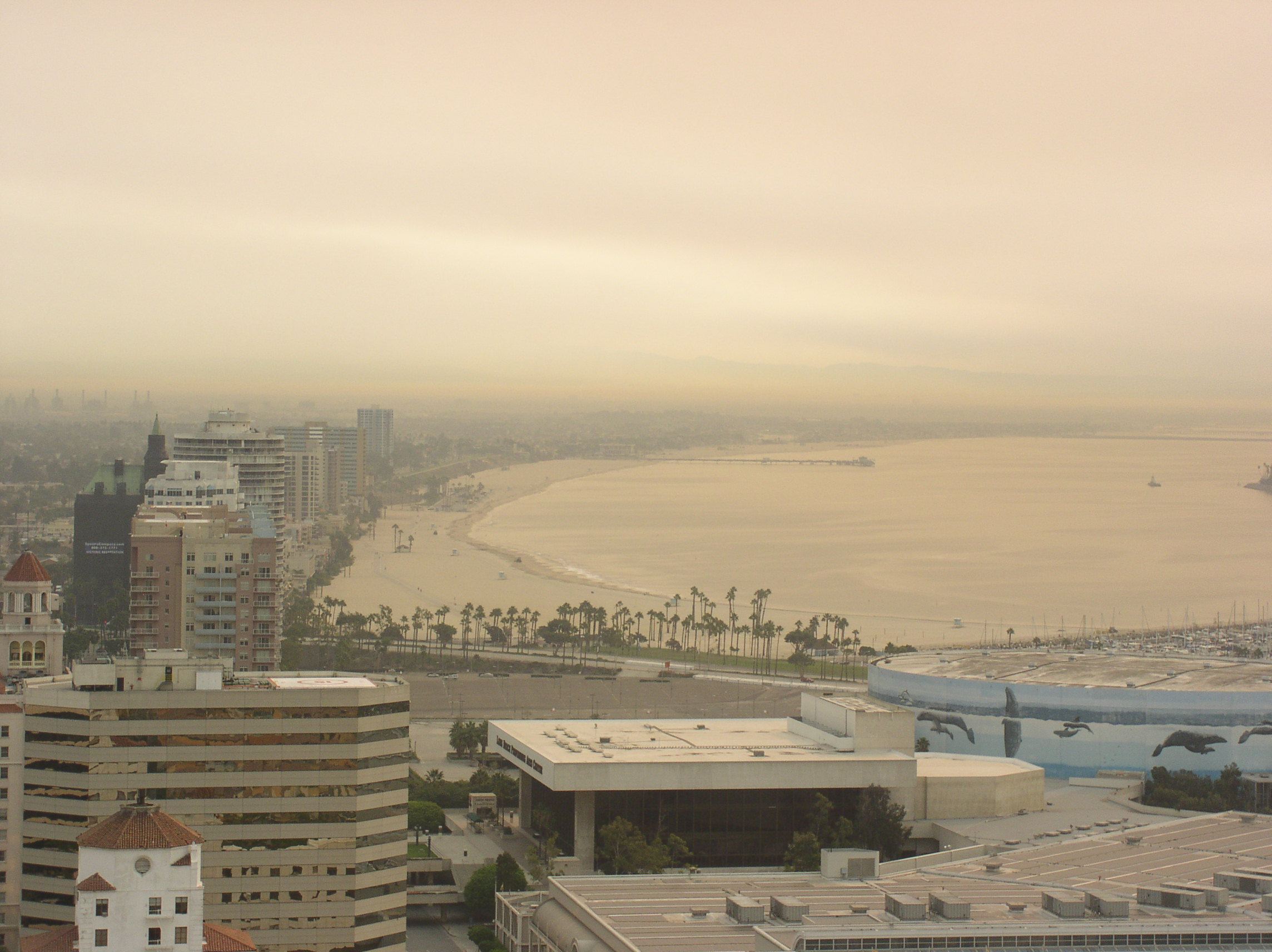
The skyline of Long Beach, California, looking east on the morning of October 24, 2007, with the sky filled with smoke.

Numerous fires burned in Los Angeles and Ventura Counties.

- The Buckweed Fire burned north of Santa Clarita in Agua Dulce and the community of Canyon Country, triggering many evacuations. This fire was the result of a child playing with matches.

- The Canyon Fire burned around Malibu, California, specifically in Malibu Canyon. It was the first of the October 2007 California wildfires to receive significant attention from the national media. In addition to damaging or destroying 14 homes, the fire destroyed two Malibu landmarks: Castle Kashan and the Presbyterian Church.

- The Magic Fire started near The Old Road at Magic Mountain Parkway, within a half mile of the Six Flags Magic Mountain theme park on the west side of Santa Clarita. Flames came within a few yards of West Ranch High School and a large housing development in Stevenson Ranch, but were pushed away. The fire is believed to have been caused accidentally by welders at a construction site.

- The Meadowridge Fire began near Highway 14 and San Fernando Road in Santa Clarita.

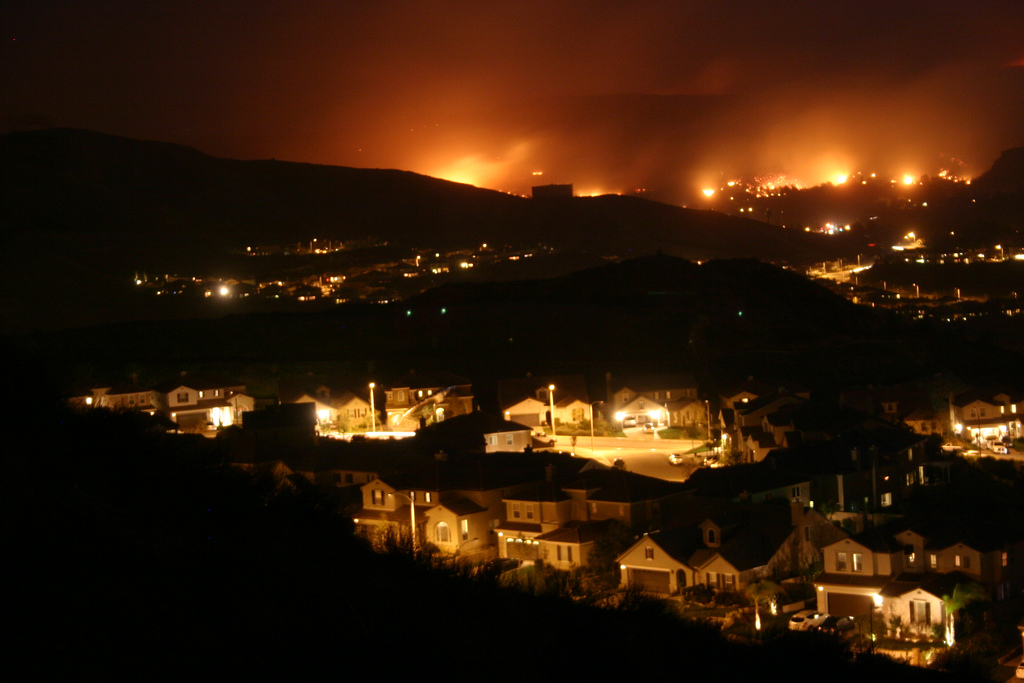
Santa Clarita, California, on the night of October 21, 2007

- The October Fire burned a small area in Santa Clarita, destroying several homes in the Canyon Breeze Mobile Home Park.

- The Ranch Fire (or Castaic Fire) burned along the Los Angeles-Ventura county line about 5 miles (8.0 km) north of Santa Clarita, in the Angeles and Los Padres national forests. It surrounded the Ventura County community of Piru and also threatened the communities of Fillmore, Ventura and Ojai. About 500 residences lie in the fire's path. Evacuations were recommended in all of Piru and portions of Fillmore. Angeles National Forest officials implemented a total forest closure on October 23.

- The Nightsky Fire burned a small area south of Moorpark in Ventura County.

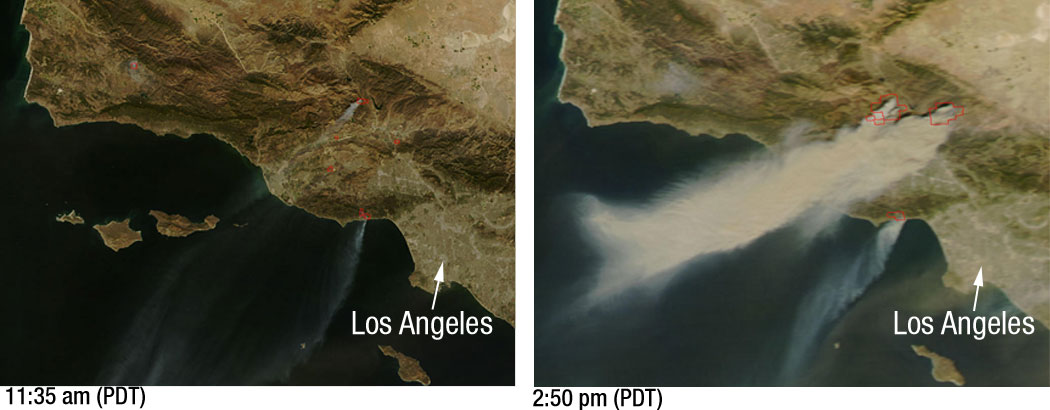
Two NASA satellite images from October 21, 2007 show how quickly the fires spread. The right image was taken just 3 hours 15 minutes after the left image.

Fire data has been provided by the CAL FIRE and independent news media. As of October 2007:

Los Angeles and Ventura counties
Fire Name	Date / Time Started	Area Burned	Structures Destroyed	Injuries	Containment Date
Ranch (Castaic / Piru)	October 20 at 9:42 p.m.	58,401 acres (236.3 km^{2})	1 home 9 outbuildings		
Buckweed	October 21 at 12:55 p.m.	38,356 acres (155.2 km^{2})	63	3 civilians 1 firefighter	
Canyon	October 21 at 4:50 a.m.	4,565 acres (18.5 km^{2})	22	3	
Magic	October 22 at 2:17 p.m.	2,824 acres (11.4 km^{2})			
Meadowridge	October 23 at 4:08 a.m.	40 acres (0.162 km^{2})			
Nightsky	October 21 at 10:35 a.m.	35 acres (0.1 km^{2})			
October	October 21 at 9:47 a.m.	25 acres (0.1 km^{2})	At least 3 mobile homes damaged		October 30

=== Orange County ===
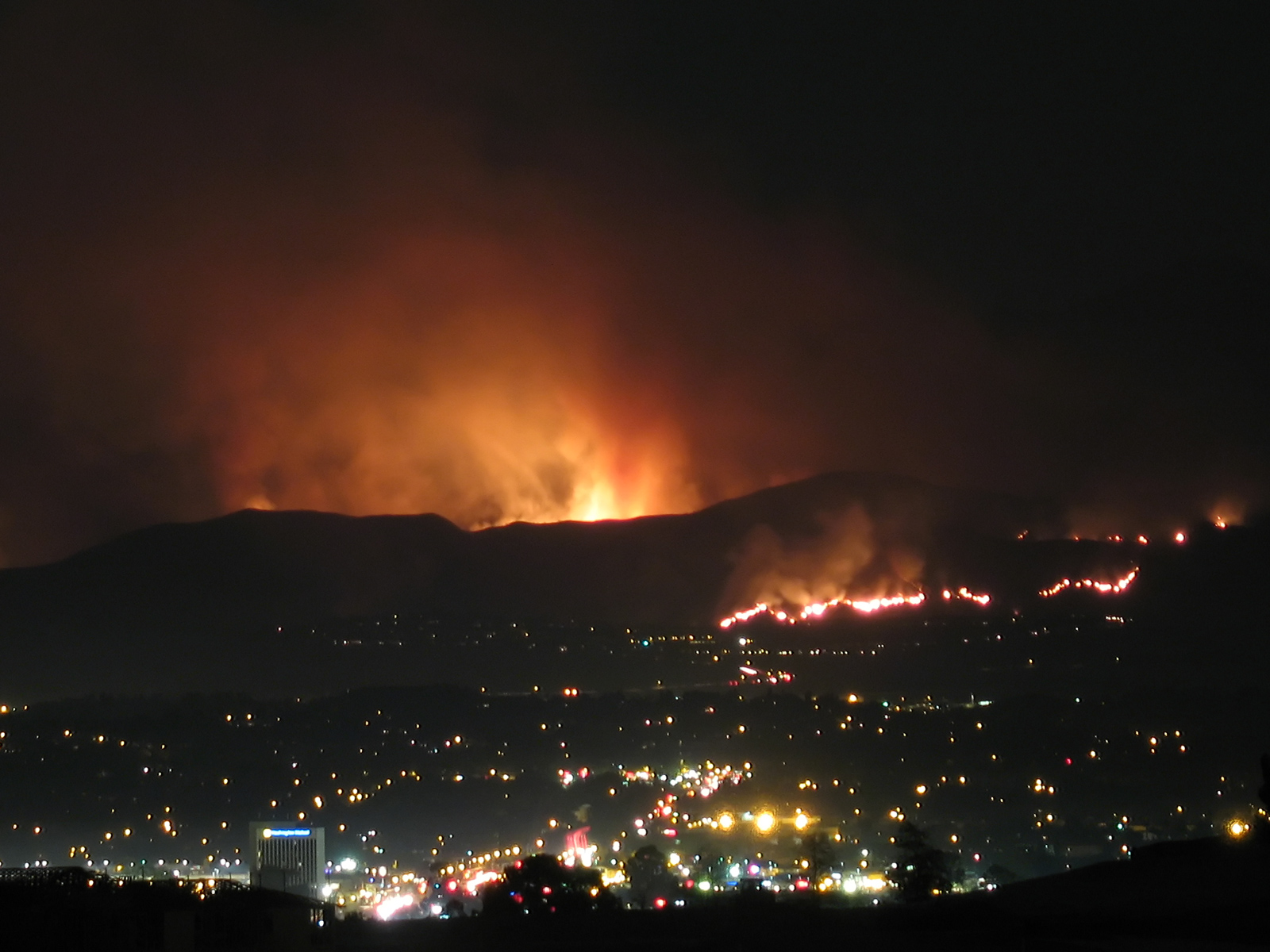
The Santiago Fire seen from Aliso Viejo, overlooking the city of Lake Forest, on October 23, 2007

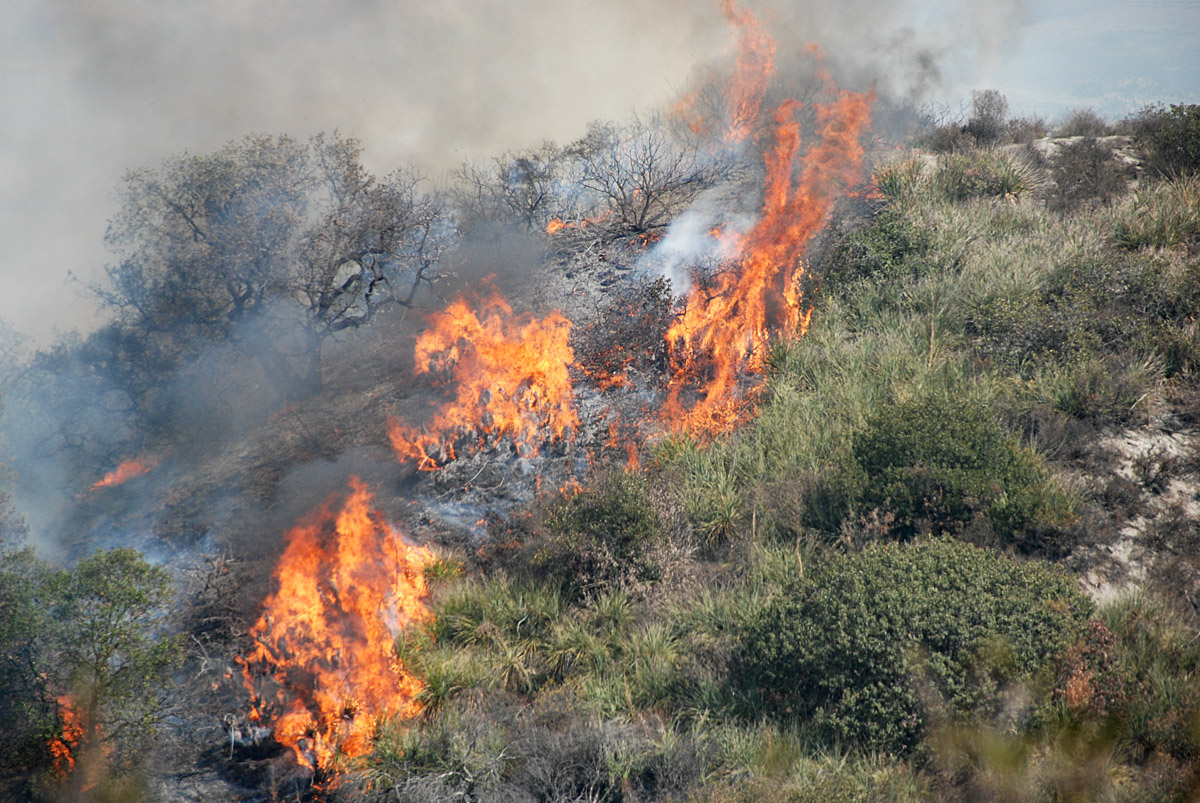
Fires burn across a hillside in Orange County.

- The Santiago Fire began shortly before 5:55 p.m. on October 21, 2007 in the foothills north of Irvine and east of the city of Orange in Orange County. The fire was reportedly started in two separate spots (along Santiago Canyon Road, west of Silverado Canyon Road); fire officials have attributed the source of the fire to arson. On October 24, 2007, Governor Arnold Schwarzenegger visited an evacuation center at El Toro High School. Schools and districts all over Orange County were closed on Friday, October 26, 2007 because of the smoke and bad air quality. A reward of $250,000 was offered for information leading to arrest of the arsonist(s). Fourteen homes and twenty four outbuildings were destroyed. Eight homes and three outbuildings were damaged, and sixteen firefighters were injured. In all, the fire burned 28,445 acres (115.1 km^{2}).

=== San Bernardino County ===
Current data on the fires has been provided by the CAL FIRE and independent news media. As of October 30:

San Bernardino County
Fire Name	Date / Time Started	Area Burned	Structures Destroyed	Injuries	Containment Date
Slide (Running Springs)	October 22 at 8:02 a.m.	12,789 acres (51.8 km^{2})	201 homes 3 outbuildings		
Grass Valley	October 22 at 5:08 p.m.	1,247 acres (5.0 km^{2})	174 homes 2 outbuildings		
Martin Ranch	October 23 at 1:03 a.m.	123 acres (0.5 km^{2})	1 home damaged	1 firefighter	
Walker	October 22 at 10:00 a.m.	160 acres (0.6 km^{2})		2 firefighters	Oct. 27
Cajon (Devore & Glen Helen)	October 22 at 11:48 a.m.	250 acres (1.0 km^{2})			
Little Mountain Fire	October 22 at 3:30 p.m.	650 acres (2.6 km^{2})			October 22

- The Slide or Green Valley Lake Fire burned near Green Valley Lake, east of Lake Arrowhead. The Green Valley Lake, Arrowbear, and Running Springs communities were evacuated. 1,359 firefighters were assigned to the fire. The estimated cost is $1.2 million. Water pressure in local systems was lost and conditions were too extreme for fighters to continue efforts in some areas. The fire partially burned "Camp Helendade," owned by the Boy Scouts of America's local council, the California Inland Empire Council. Helendade was originally given to the council in 1960 to replace another camp that had been burned.

- The Grass Valley Fire was located just north of Lake Arrowhead.

- Together, the Devore and Glen Helen Fires (or Cajon Fire) forced the closure of Interstate 15 in the Cajon Pass. One fire was started by an overturned semi-truck.

- The Little Mountain Fire threatened several homes and other structures near Cal State San Bernardino before it was contained. Due to the cumulative effects of the area fires, the University closed for the week of October 23.

=== Santa Barbara County ===
- The Sedgewick Fire was the northernmost of the October 2007 California wildfires. It ignited around 6:00 a.m. PDT on October 21, 2007 from a downed power line. The fire burned a total of 710 acres (2.9 km^{2}) near Los Olivos. Approximately 2000 people were affected and 800 homes threatened before the fire was 100% contained around 5:00 p.m. on October 22.

=== Riverside County ===
- The Roca Fire was reported around 3:52 p.m. on October 21 in the vicinity of SR 79 at SR 371 in Aguanga. One home was destroyed and one injury was reported. It was 100% contained on October 22, after burning 270 acres (1.1 km^{2}).

- The Rosa Fire, three clustered blazes in the Via Santa Rosa/Rancho California Road area of western Temecula began October 22. It was 100% contained by October 24, after burning 411 acres (1.7 km^{2}). Investigators suspect arson.

- The Wildomar Fire began around 12:30 on October 24 in Wildomar brush, between I-15 and I-215. It was 100% contained within the same day, after burning 20 acres (0.1 km^{2}).

=== Baja California ===
Fires also burned in northern parts of the Mexican state of Baja California. The Harris Fire burned near Tecate, and fires burned near Tijuana as well.

More than fifteen thousand hectares were consumed by the wildfires in Baja California. Tijuana, Tecate and Ensenada were the municipalities more affected by the fire. In total there were seven fires caused by Santa Ana winds. The community of Maneadero, in the highlands of Ensenada, was the most affected.

== Wind and weather ==
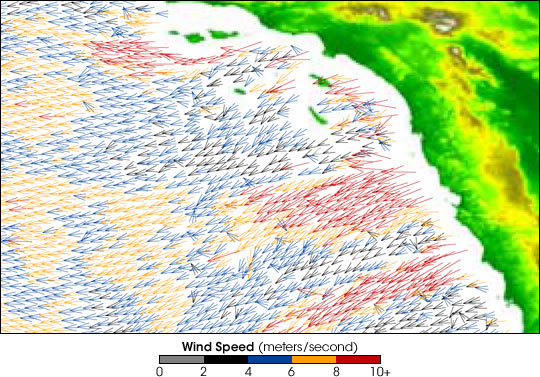
QuikSCAT image from 2002 showing the speed of the Santa Ana winds (m/s)

The fires occurred at the end of a dry summer and were exacerbated by the seasonal Santa Ana winds, which were blowing at an unusually high strength at that time. The San Diego Union-Tribune reported, "Santa Ana winds blowing up to 60 mph (97 km/h) combined with temperatures into the 90s to create in the worst possible fire conditions." At one point swirling winds threatened to bring fire into densely populated urban areas. At the height of the Santa Ana winds on October 22, the winds reached sustained speeds of 90 mph (140 km/h), with wind gusts up to 112 mph (180 km/h) reported.

Southern California was in the midst of an unusual drought; in Los Angeles, California, with only 3.21 in (82 mm) of precipitation in 2006–2007, it was the driest year on record. The combination of wind, heat, and dryness turned the chaparral into fire fuel. Officials believed that some of the fires generated their own winds, similar to the Oakland firestorm of 1991. The effects of the smoke were felt as far away as Brentwood, California (in the East Bay, near Stockton), where it impacted local weather. The high-speed Santa Ana winds also rendered the use of dropping water from fire fighting aircraft inefficient; until such winds abate, most payloads of water are just dispersed by the wind over an area so large that the water evaporates before it can reach a large fire on the ground.

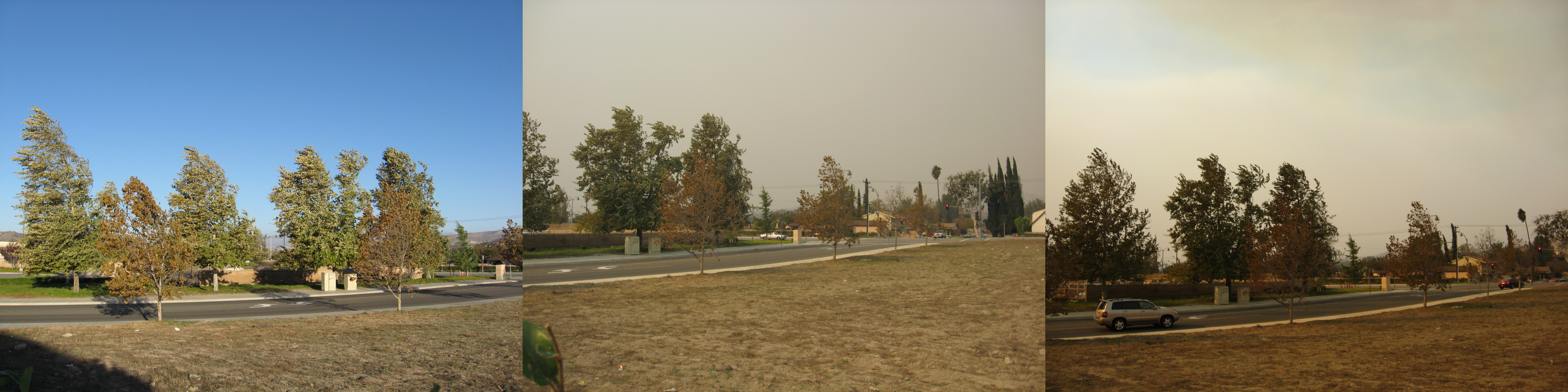
A comparison of the Simi Valley skyline from October 21, 2007 (left and center) to October 22, 2007 (right)

== Impact ==
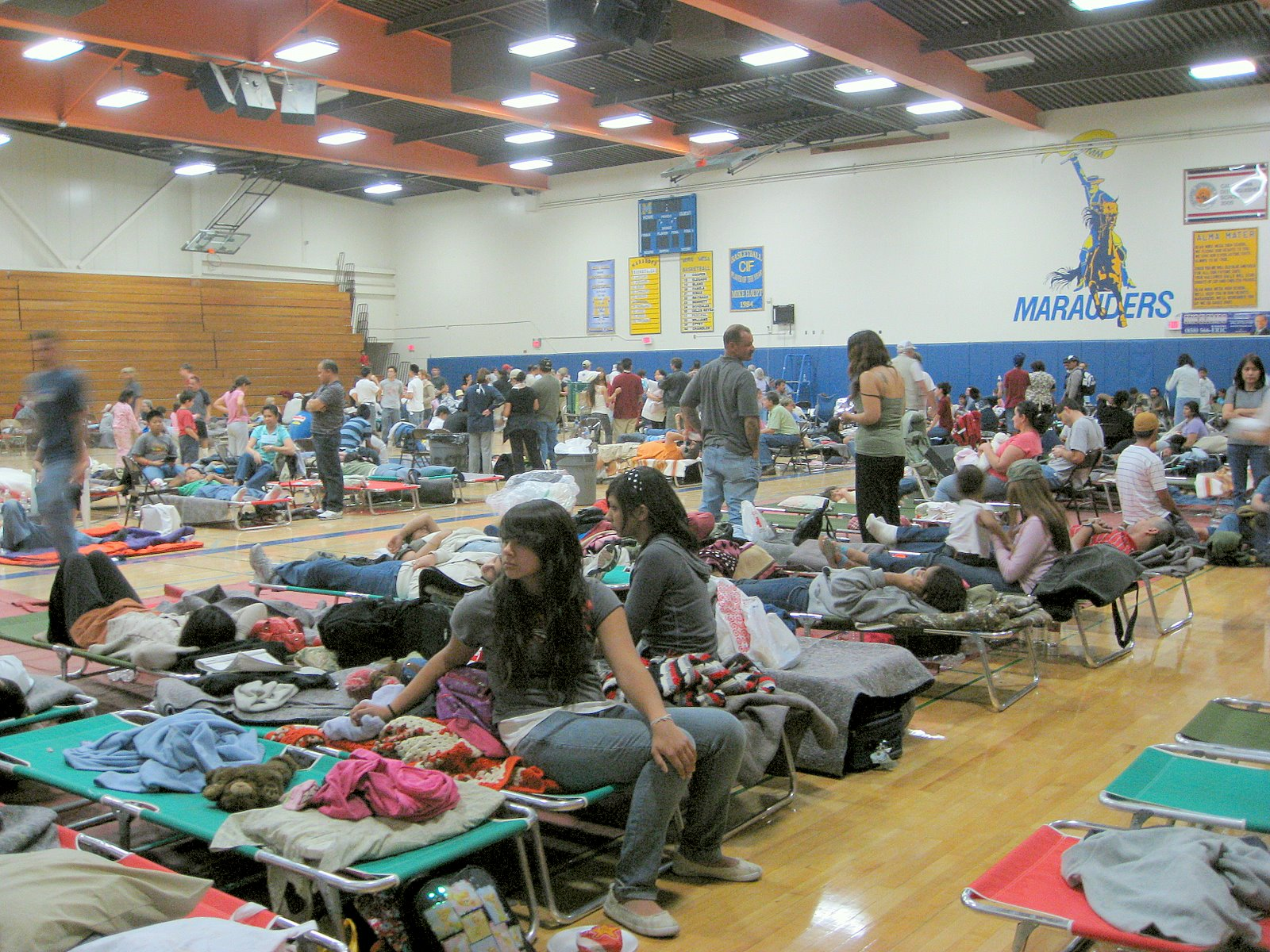
Evacuees at evacuation site Mira Mesa High School

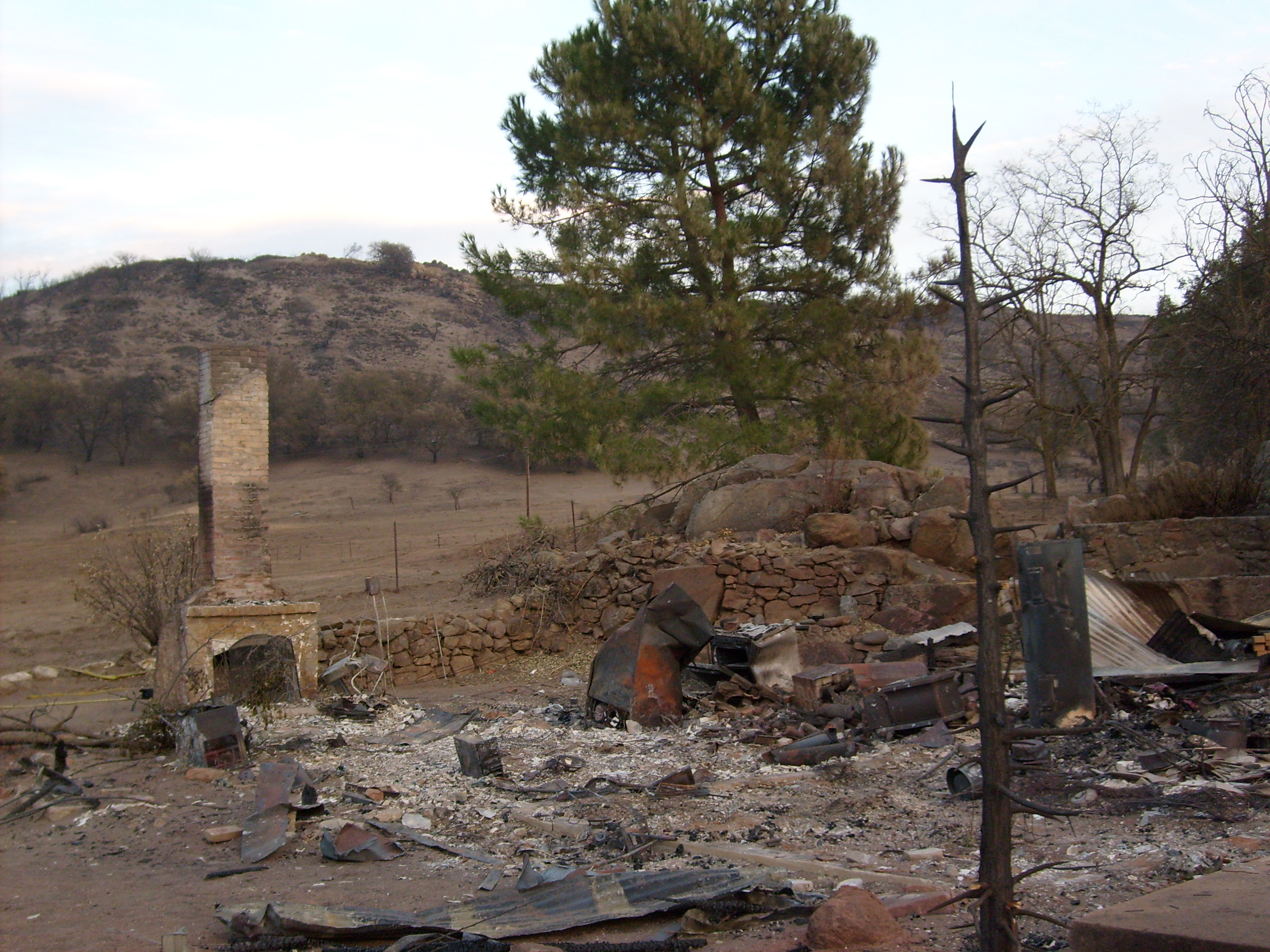
The remains of a home destroyed by the Witch Creek Fire

On October 21, the Harris Fire damaged and disabled the Southwest Power Link, a 500,000-volt power line from Arizona to San Diego. Power outages were reported in Los Angeles, Orange, San Diego, and other counties on October 22 to 333,500 Southern California Edison customers, most being restored within 24 hours. The power outage also affected the areas of Ojai, Oxnard, Simi Valley, Santa Clarita, Thousand Oaks, Agoura Hills, Rialto, Fontana, San Bernardino, Rancho Cucamonga, Mira Loma, Hesperia, Corona, Bloomington, Irvine, Calimesa and Rubidoux. This outage also caused 230 people to be without power in Malibu. The California Independent System Operator Corp declared an energy transmission emergency in southern California on October 23, due to wildfires affecting the lines. 500,000-, 230,000- and 138,000-volt lines were disabled in San Diego, and some lines in other areas were also disabled. 24,992 people lost power, due to the lack of power from the power grid. During the crisis, Mexico provided power to help augment the electrical needs of the San Diego area.

Authorities said that the evacuation, of more than 900,000 people, was the largest in the history of California. By mid-morning on October 22, 2007, thousands of evacuees had taken shelter in Qualcomm Stadium and other locations throughout San Diego. On the afternoon of October 22, 2007, the Marines evacuated some planes from Marine Corps Air Station Miramar to other military bases in California and Arizona. The Navy moved all non-essential personnel from Naval Base San Diego barracks onto nearby vessels to accommodate refugees. The San Diego Wild Animal Park moved some animals to the on-site animal hospital for their protection.

The Horno Fire had charred 6,000 acres (24 km^{2}) in Camp Pendleton by 4:00 A.M PDT, on October 24, 2007. It caused the closure of Interstate 5 and it also caused Amtrak California to stop Surfliner service between Oceanside and San Clemente. Traffic was diverted to Interstate 15, which had itself been closed earlier. Illegal migrant workers were endangered by the crisis, sometimes staying at work in the fields in mandatory evacuation zones. Many lived in nearby canyons and distrusted officials. When fleeing the fires, some were arrested, while others were turned away from shelters due to lack of adequate identification. Some Mexican firefighters expressed concern about their countrymen, while others felt the migrant workers were aware of the risks they were taking.

Only a few cases of looting were documented. Six people were arrested for stealing supplies from Qualcomm stadium, another was arrested for theft after being found in possession of stolen goods in the Jamul fire area, and two were arrested near the Tecate border crossing.

=== Air quality and effects on health ===
The concentration of particulate matter 10 micrometers and smaller (designated PM10) reached unhealthy levels as a result of the fires. PM10 particles are small enough to enter deep into the lungs, and possibly the bloodstream. San Diego city attorney Michael Aguirre, citing concerns over weather conditions and air quality, urged the city to consider a voluntary evacuation of the entire city.

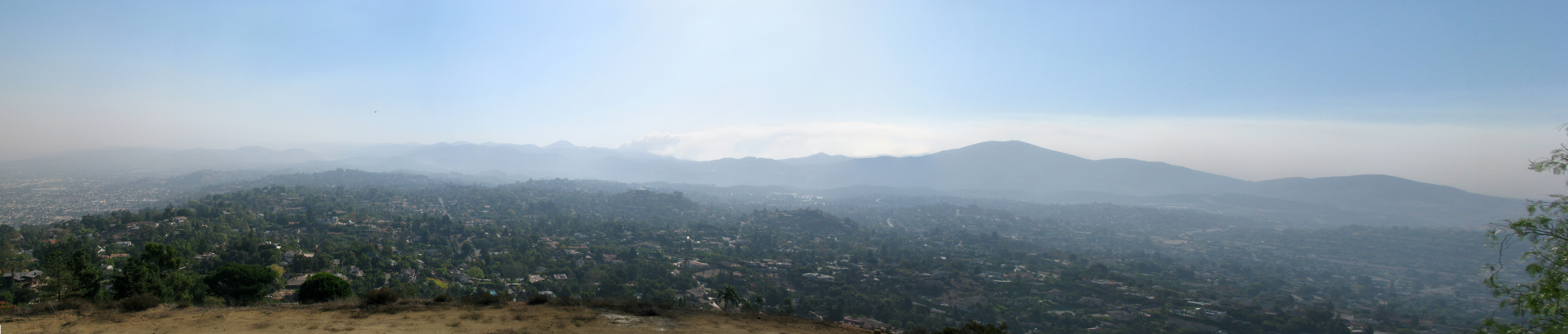
Smoke fills the horizon in East San Diego County, October 22, 2007.

== Response ==
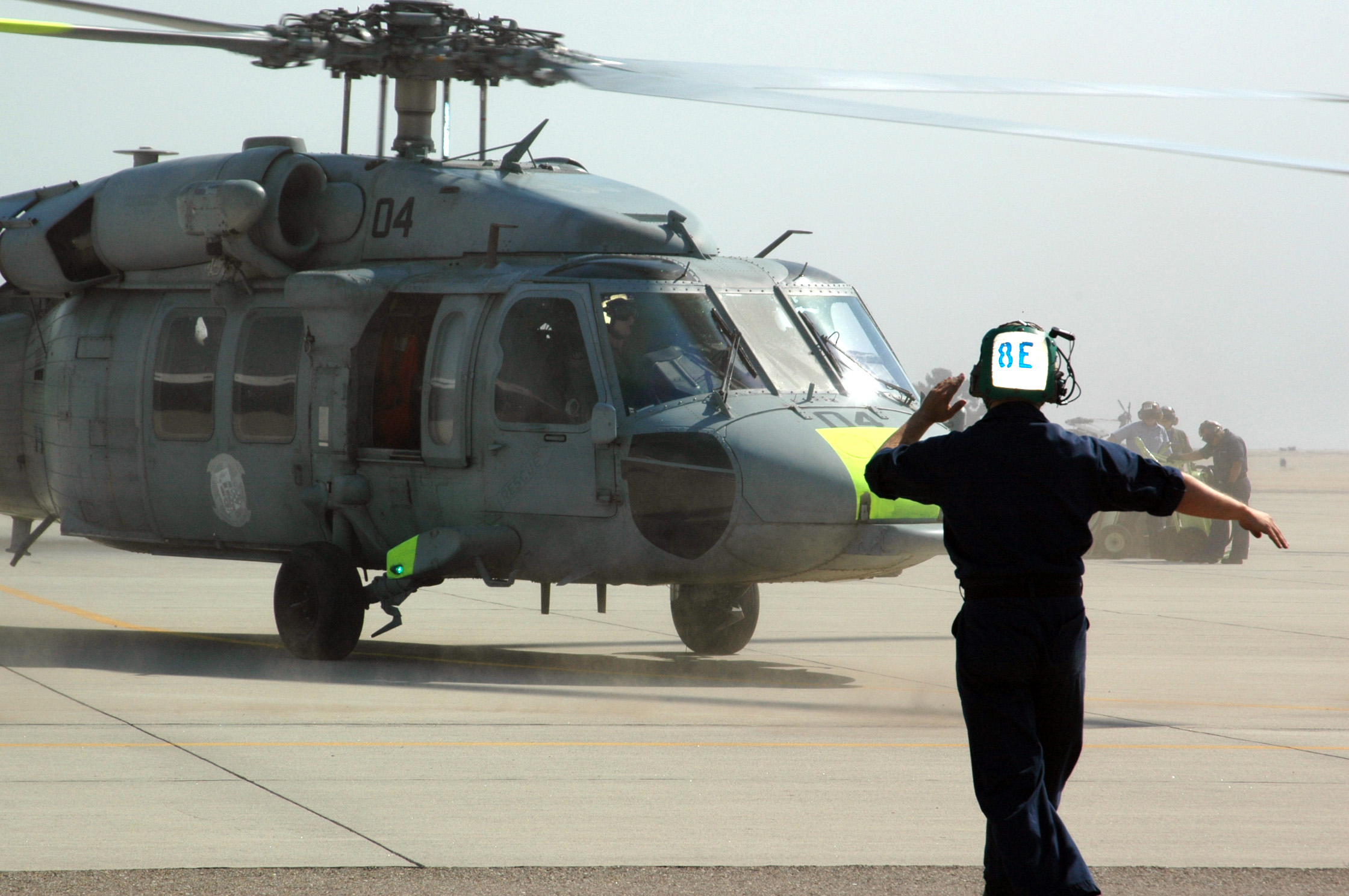
At Naval Air Station North Island, a plane captain launches an MH-60S Seahawk from Helicopter Sea Combat Squadron (HSC) 85 to conduct operations in support of the California Department of Forestry's efforts in combating the San Diego wildfires.

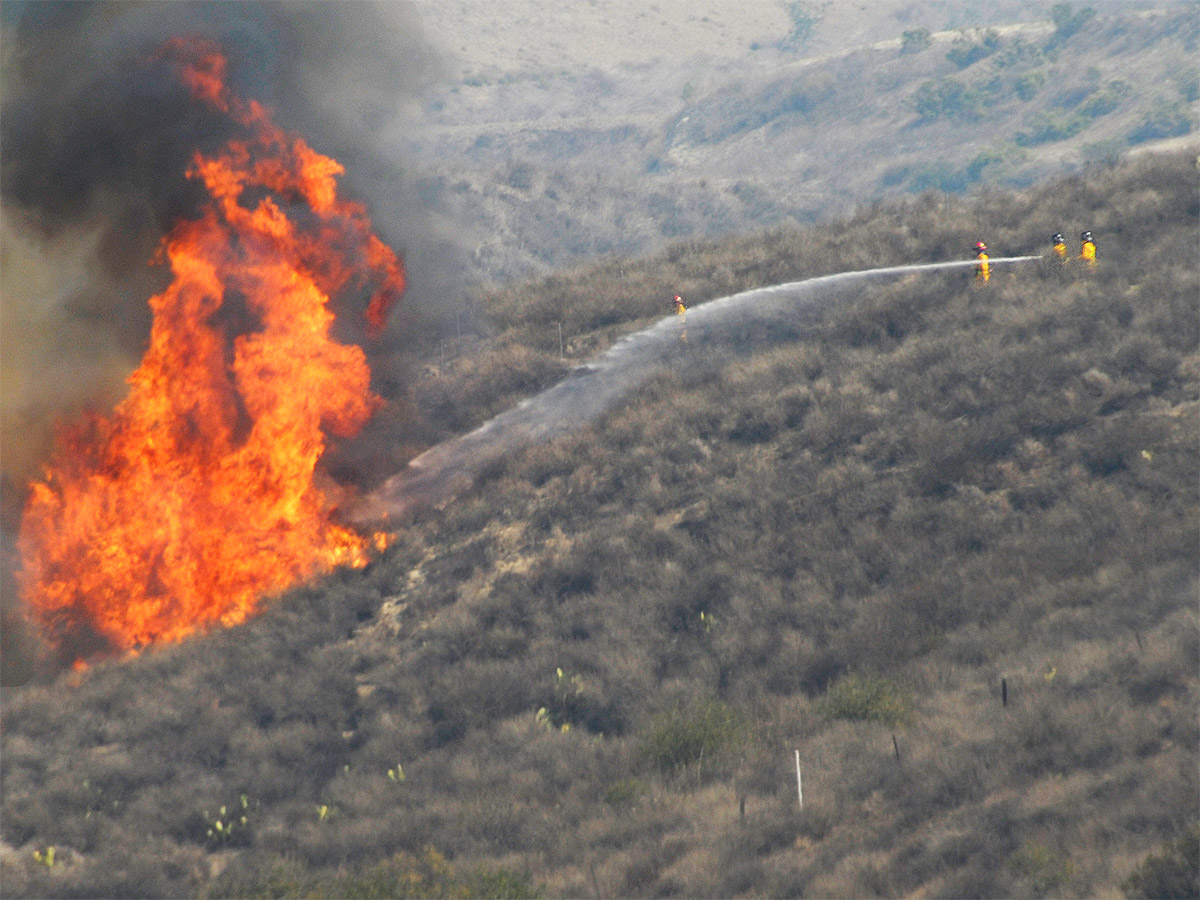
Firefighters battle a blaze near Irvine, California.

Government agencies and volunteers worked together to mitigate the effects of the fires. According to the state of California's Consolidated Response web page, "There are 17 active fires in Southern California. The priority for fighting fires as of 19:30 on October 21 is the Buckweed, Witch, Harris, Canyon, Ranch, Santiago, and Sedgewick Fires." March Air Reserve Base was the primary staging area for relief supplies coordinated by the Federal Emergency Management Agency.

With many businesses and schools closed, some people used their time off to help others. An estimated 10,000 evacuees gathered at Qualcomm Stadium, the largest shelter point in San Diego. Besides food, blankets and water, volunteers provided toys for children, massages, and a live rock and roll performance. CERT teams, in various cities, received their first activation since the program's inception in this region. Trained volunteers provided assistance ranging from coordinating relief, to acting as a fire department auxiliary. Religious groups such as Victim Relief Ministries, Giving Children Hope, Hope Force International, Apostolic World Relief, and the Salvation Army opened places of worship, donated supplies, and fed workers and evacuees.

The Department of Defense contributed twelve engines for firefighting efforts. The National Guard called more than 2,400 troops, with 17,000 available if needed; of which 100 California National Guard medical personnel provided medical assistance. Six crews from the Navy's Helicopter Sea Combat Squadron 85 based at Naval Air Station North Island were assigned to battle the Witch Creek fire. They flew MH-60 Seahawk helicopters equipped with a 420-gallon water bucket and they were the only local Navy teams trained to fight fires from the air. Marine Corps Air Station Miramar contributed several aircraft as well as fire fighting trucks to operations based in Ramona. One of the larger airtankers, the Martin Mars, sent through a private contract from its home in Port Alberni, British Columbia on October 25, landed on Lake Elsinore in Riverside County, California. It has a 7,000 gallon capacity. Two other airtankers and their crews from Quebec worked on the fires, part of an annual three-month contract with the state of California.

California Governor Arnold Schwarzenegger declared a state of emergency in seven California counties where fires burned. President George W. Bush concurred and visited the region on Thursday, October 25, 2007.

Rep. Duncan Hunter criticized state fire officials for delaying the use of Marine helicopters until CalFire spotters were in position to coordinate their efforts. However, California Fire Marshal Kate Dargan said that the Marines and officials at CalFire were following procedures worked out with the military after serious problems with air coordination during the 2003 California wildfires. Other state officials also praised the federal response. Aaron McLear, a spokesman for Schwarzenegger, said the governor "is getting everything he needs from the federal government".

NBC Nightly News reported that with the evacuations reaching about 950,000 people, this was the largest peacetime movement of Americans since the Civil War era, although similar evacuation figures were cited for Hurricane Rita and Hurricane Katrina.

On November 6, 2007, the state of California reported that the fires were under control. On November 9, the last vole of wildfires were finally contained. According to the state's consolidated report on the fires, Governor Arnold Schwarzenegger "called on the Blue Ribbon Task Force to assess the next steps to take at federal, state and local levels of government to prevent and fight future fires. Additionally, the Governor asked the task force to review the Governor’s Blue Ribbon Fire Commission’s recommendations, generated after the 2003 fires, to evaluate if the recommendations are still the best and most effective ways in preventing and fighting fires."

== See also ==
- Witch Fire
- Recloser
- Corral Fire (2007)
- 2003 California wildfires
- 2008 California wildfires
- May 2014 San Diego County wildfires
- 2017 California wildfires
  - October 2017 Northern California wildfires
  - December 2017 Southern California wildfires
- List of California wildfires
- Pacific Gas and Electric
- San Diego Gas and Electric
- Wildfires in California-related topics
- FIRESCOPE
