= Corral Fire =

2007 wildfire in Southern California

- Part of October 2007 California wildfires
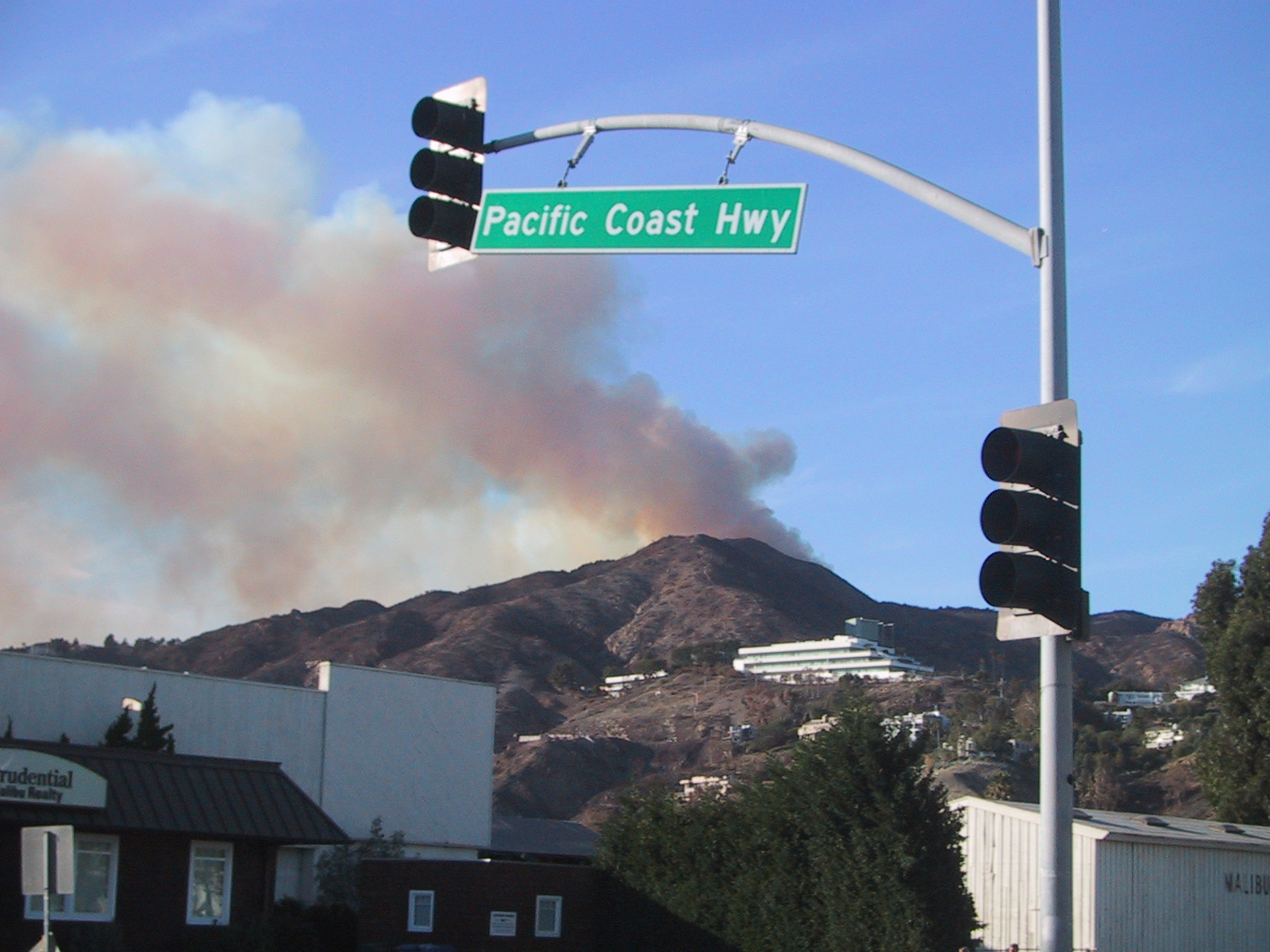
- View from downtown Malibu during the afternoon of November 24
- Date: November 24, 2007 –; November 27, 2007
- Location: Malibu Creek State Park, Los Angeles, California

Statistics
- Burned area: 4,901 acres (20 km^{2})

Impacts
- Structures lost: 86
- Cost: Unknown

The Corral Fire was a wildfire that burned from November 24 until November 27, 2007, in the Malibu Creek State Park. The fire, which burned 4,901 acres (20 km^{2}) of land, forced the evacuation of 10,000–14,000 residents in Los Angeles, and injured 7 firefighters.

== The fire ==
The recurrence of powerful Santa Ana Winds fueled the fire upon its start on November 24 at 3:24 AM PST. The Corral Fire rapidly expanded, and soon destroyed over 80 structures, including 49 homes, with another 27 damaged. Governor Arnold Schwarzenegger reactivated the state of emergency on November 24, which was declared during the previous month wildfires to "...(provide) any needed resources to fight these fires or help those Californians who have been impacted." During the morning of November 27, at 8:00 AM PST, the Corral Fire was reported to be 100% contained.

== Gallery ==
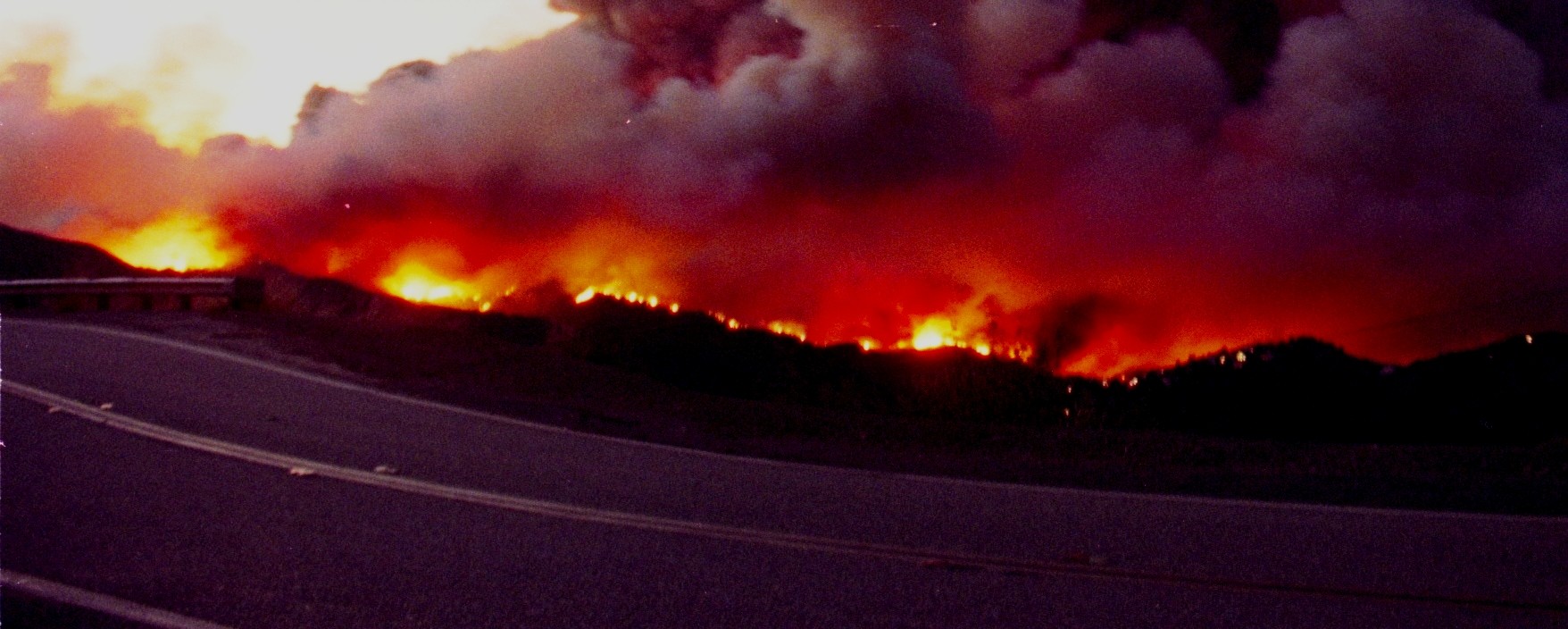
Looking down on the Corral Canyon brush fire from Latigo Cyn Rd after sunrise on November 24, 2007. Malibu, CA

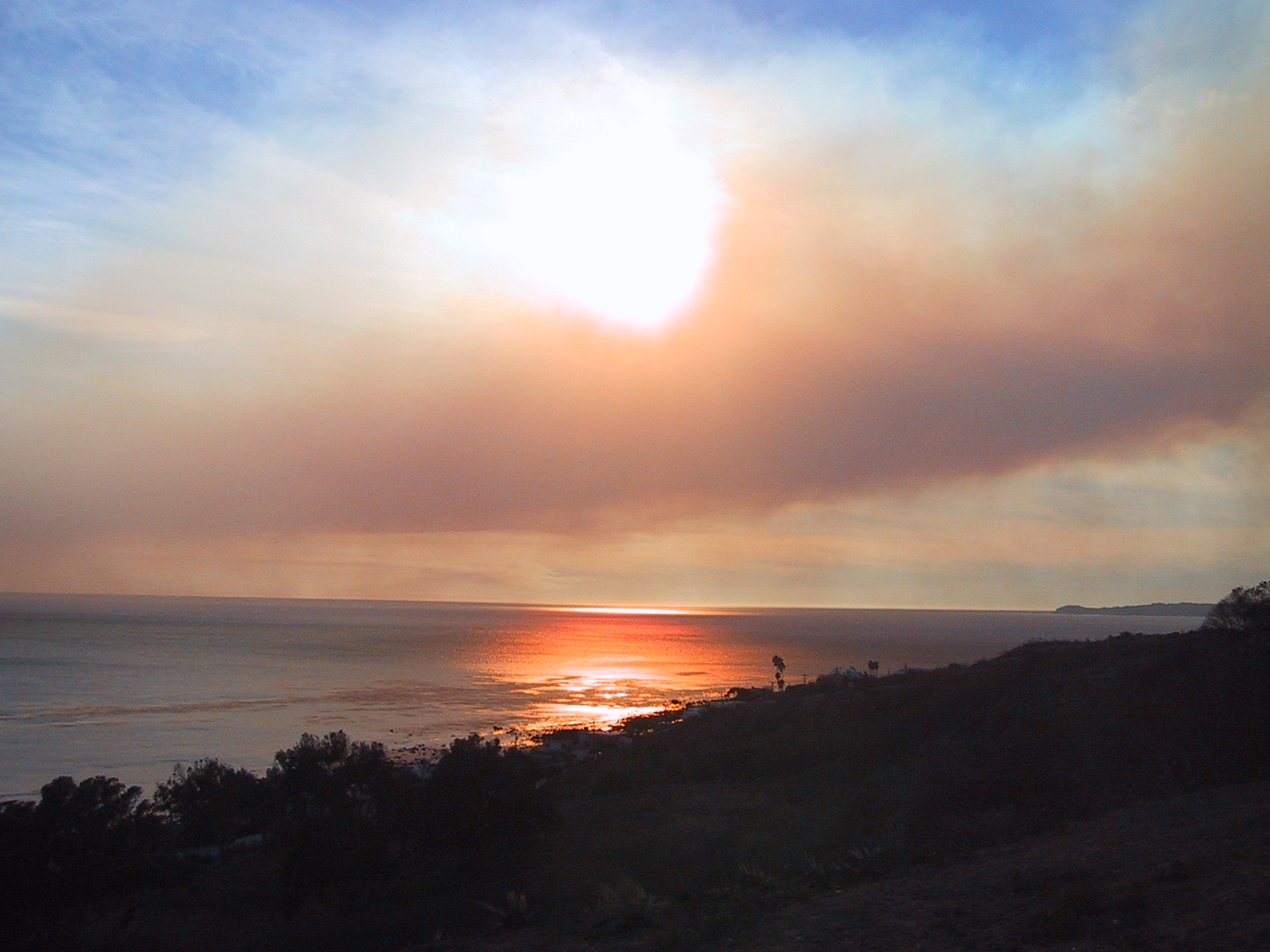
Smoke from the Corral Fire drifts out over the Pacific Ocean on November 24.

== See also ==
- 2007 California wildfires
  - October 2007 California wildfires
