= San Bernardino–Tippecanoe station =

Train station in San Bernardino, California, US

San Bernardino–Tippecanoe
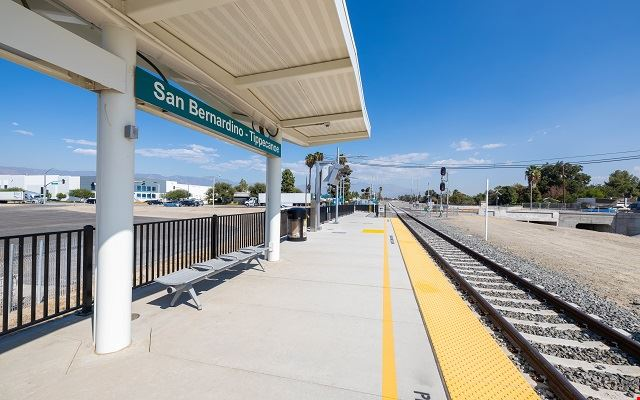
- San Bernardino–Tippecanoe station platform

General information
- Location: 1498 South Tippecanoe Avenue; San Bernardino, California
- Coordinates: 34.0735°N 117.2604°W
- Owner: San Bernardino County Transportation Authority
- Line: Redlands Branch
- Platforms: 1 side platform
- Tracks: 1
- Connections: Omnitrans: 8

Construction
- Accessible: Yes

History
- Opened: October 24, 2022

Passengers
- FY 2026: 25 (avg. wkdy boardings)

Services
Preceding station	Metrolink	Following station
San Bernardino–Downtown Terminus	Arrow	Redlands–Esri toward Redlands–University
San Bernardino Line does not stop here
Location

San Bernardino–Tippecanoe station is a train station located at Tippecanoe Avenue on the border of the Riverview neighborhood and the Hospitality Lane District in San Bernardino, California. The station opened on October 24, 2022, and is served by the Arrow rail service. Metrolink's San Bernardino Line trains between Los Angeles Union Station and Redlands–Downtown utilize the main track, but do not stop at this station.

Arrow trains operate daily. On weekdays, service runs between approximately 4 am and 11 pm, with 30-minute frequencies during the early morning and evening peak periods and hourly service at other times. On weekends, trains operate between about 7:30 pm and 10 pm at hourly intervals, with three 1-hour gaps in service in the morning, afternoon, and evening.
