= Redlands–Esri station =

Train station in Redlands, California, US

Redlands–Esri
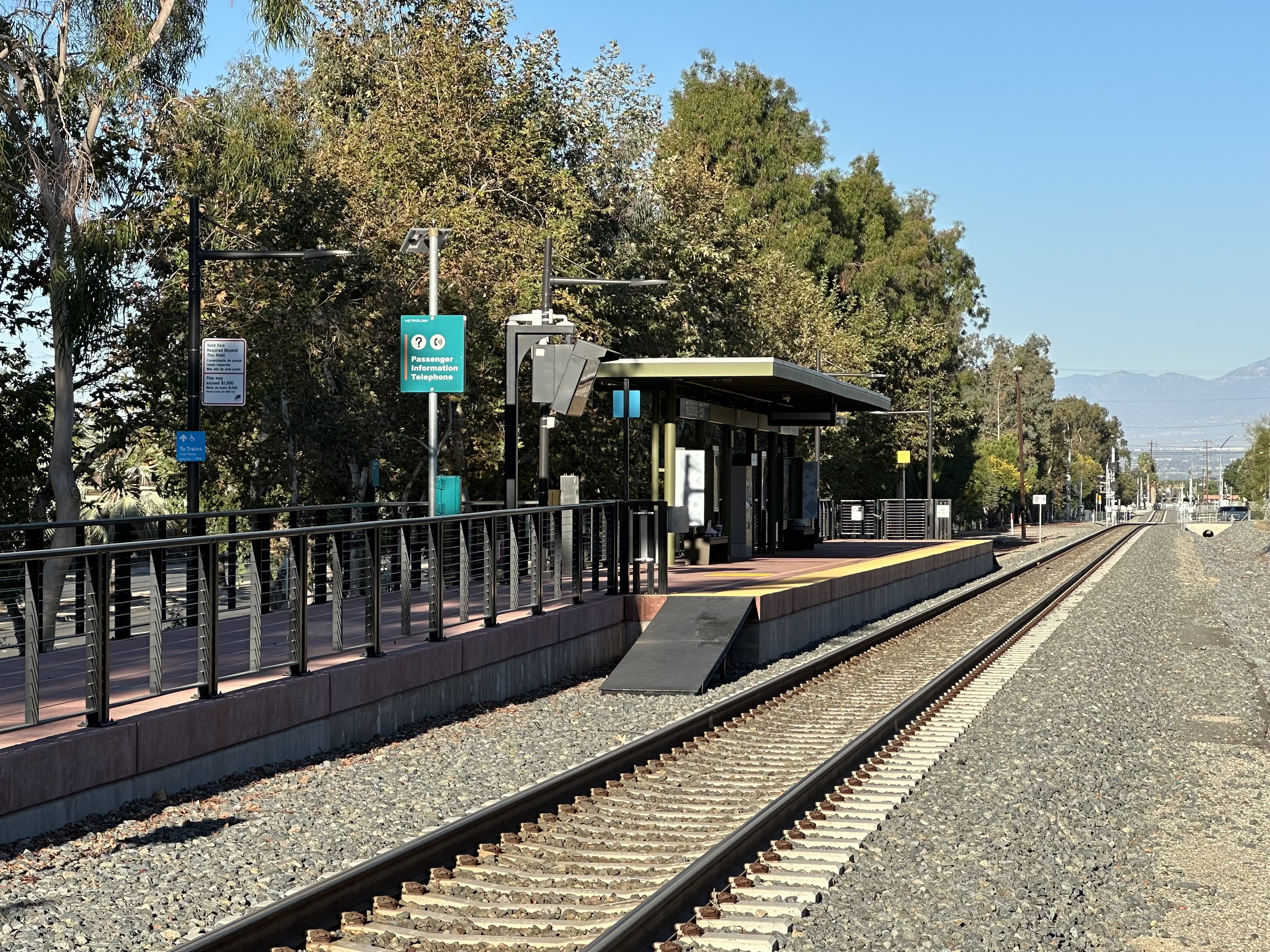
- Redlands–Esri station, October 2025

General information
- Location: 601 New York Street; Redlands, California
- Coordinates: 34.060143°N 117.196453°W
- Owner: San Bernardino County Transportation Authority
- Line: Redlands Branch
- Platforms: 1 side platform
- Tracks: 1

Construction
- Accessible: Yes

History
- Opened: October 24, 2022

Passengers
- FY 2026: 28 (avg. wkdy boardings)

Services
Preceding station	Metrolink	Following station
San Bernardino–Tippecanoe toward San Bernardino–Downtown	Arrow	Redlands–Downtown toward Redlands–University
San Bernardino Line does not stop here
Location

Redlands–Esri station is a train station in Redlands, California. It is located north of the headquarters of the geographic information system company Esri (Environmental Systems Research Institute), who funded the station's construction. The station opened on October 24, 2022 and is served by the Arrow rail line. Metrolink's San Bernardino Line trains between Los Angeles Union Station and Redlands–Downtown utilize the main track, but do not stop at this station.

Arrow trains operate daily. On weekdays, service runs between approximately 4 am and 11 pm, with 30-minute frequencies during the early morning and evening peak periods and hourly service at other times. On weekends, trains operate between about 7:30 pm and 10 pm at hourly intervals, with three 1-hour gaps in service in the morning, afternoon, and evening.
