= Arrow (rail service) =

Hybrid rail service in San Bernardino County, California

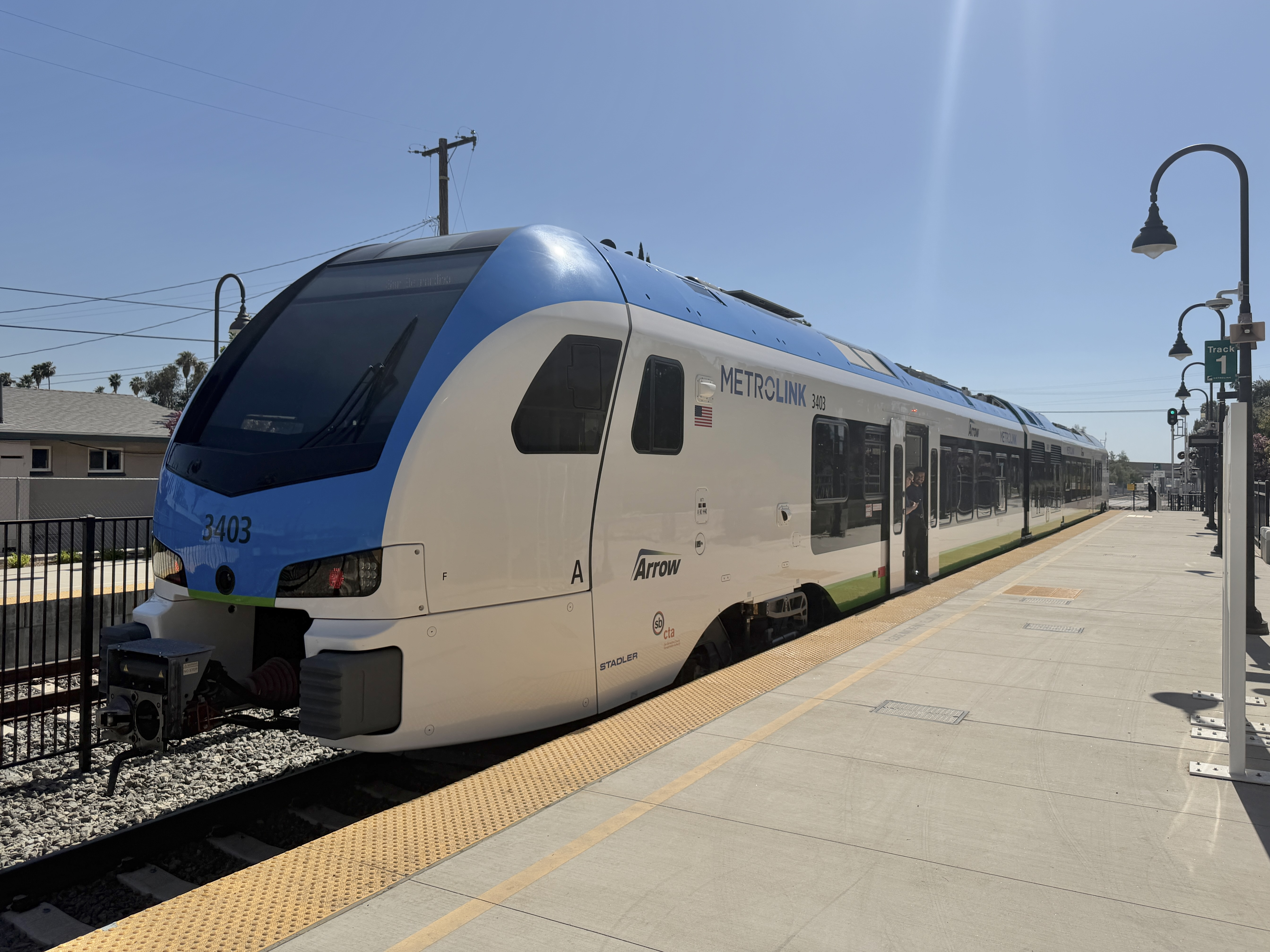
- Arrow at Redlands–University station

Overview
- Owner: San Bernardino County Transportation Authority
- Locale: San Bernardino Valley
- Termini: San Bernardino–Downtown; Redlands–University
- Stations: 5

Service
- Type: Hybrid rail
- System: Metrolink
- Operator: Metrolink
- Rolling stock: Stadler FLIRT
- Daily ridership: 553 (weekdays, Q3 2025)

History
- Opened: October 24, 2022

Technical
- Line length: 9 miles (14 km)
- Character: Exclusive right of way with at-grade crossings
- Track gauge: 4 ft 8 1/2 in (1,435 mm) standard gauge
Route map
Arrow highlighted in lime

Arrow is a hybrid rail service in San Bernardino County, California, United States. Opened on October 24, 2022, the line runs from the San Bernardino Transit Center in Downtown San Bernardino in the west to the University of Redlands in Redlands in the east.

The line was planned and constructed by the San Bernardino County Transportation Authority as the Redlands Passenger Rail Project and is operated under contract by Metrolink, which integrates Arrow into its commuter rail system, making it the only line in the entire Metrolink system to be entirely in San Bernardino County and also became the second line not to serve Los Angeles Union Station nor cross the Los Angeles River since the opening of the Inland Empire–Orange County Line in October 1995. This is the first and only Metrolink line to utilize completely different rolling stock than the rest of the system.

== Operation ==
=== Route ===
The 9-mile (14 km) route uses a former Atchison, Topeka and Santa Fe Railway line. While mostly a single track line, 2 miles (3.2 km) of double track were constructed in the middle of the route to allow vehicles to pass each other. Low-volume freight service by BNSF Railway uses the route during overnight hours when Arrow service is not running for a few customers located on the portion of the line just west of San Bernardino–Tippecanoe station.

=== Hours and frequency ===
Arrow trains operate daily. On weekdays, service runs between approximately 4 am and 11 pm, with 30-minute frequencies during the early morning and evening peak periods and hourly service at other times. On weekends, trains operate between about 7:30 pm and 10 pm at hourly intervals, with three 1-hour gaps in service in the morning, afternoon, and evening.

Between 10 and 11 pm on weekend nights, trains run every 30 minutes between Redlands–Downtown and Redlands–University.

Most trip schedules are coordinated to allow relatively short connection times with San Bernardino Line trains at San Bernardino Transit Center for trips to and from Los Angeles.

=== Stations ===
From west to east, the line starts at the San Bernardino Transit Center (also called San Bernardino–Downtown station), where passengers can transfer to several local and regional bus routes, Metrolink trains and the sbX bus rapid transit line, the line then makes stops at San Bernardino–Tippecanoe station, crosses under Interstate 10 and enters Redlands reaching the Redlands–Esri station, after that trains enter central Redlands serving Redlands–Downtown station, built alongside the historic Redlands Santa Fe Depot, before reaching its final stop, Redlands–University station at the University of Redlands.

Station	Major connections	Location
San Bernardino–Downtown	Metrolink: Inland Empire–Orange County San Bernardino; Omnitrans: sbX	San Bernardino
San Bernardino–Tippecanoe		San Bernardino
Redlands–Esri		Redlands
Redlands–Downtown	Metrolink: San Bernardino (limited weekday service)	Redlands
Redlands–University		Redlands

== Rolling stock ==
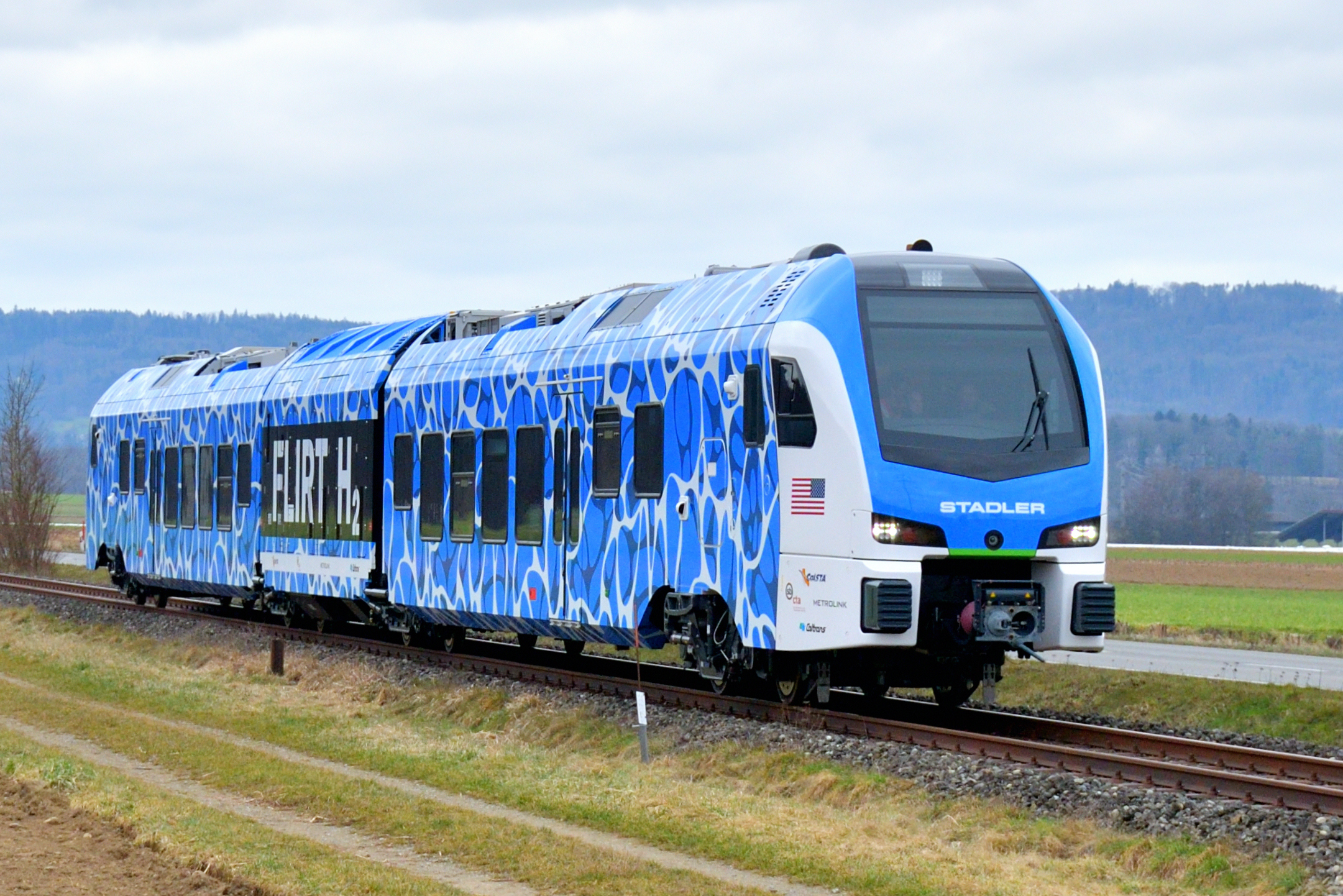
Hydrogen-powered ZEMU Unit 3501 testing in Ramsen, Switzerland.

FLIRT diesel multiple units (DMUs) built by Stadler Rail were selected for service on the Arrow line under a $31.4 million contract.

Compared with traditional commuter rail trains, the DMUs are powered by smaller, low-emission (Tier 4) diesel engines. These engines are located in a "PowerPack" car in the center of the train, which isolates noise and vibrations from the passenger areas. The car has a central gangway allowing passengers to pass through. The engines are paired with a generator to produce electricity, which is fed to power equipment in compartments behind the operator cabs and then to the traction motors. This is the same equipment used in all-electric FLIRT units.

Arrow trains have a capacity of up to 116 seated and 118 standing passengers, with two wheelchair areas. The trains also feature ten tables for passengers to work, USB charging outlets at most seats, storage hooks for bicycles, and level boarding at station platforms.

An additional FLIRT utilizing hydrogen fuel cell technology was developed by Stadler as part of SBCTA's Zero-Emission Multiple Unit (ZEMU) project. The ZEMU entered passenger service on September 13, 2025.

Model	Type	Entered service	Fleet numbers	Qty	Notes
Stadler FLIRT	DMU	2022	3401–3403	3	
Stadler FLIRT	ZEMU	2025	3501	1	Option for 3 additional units

== Maintenance facility ==
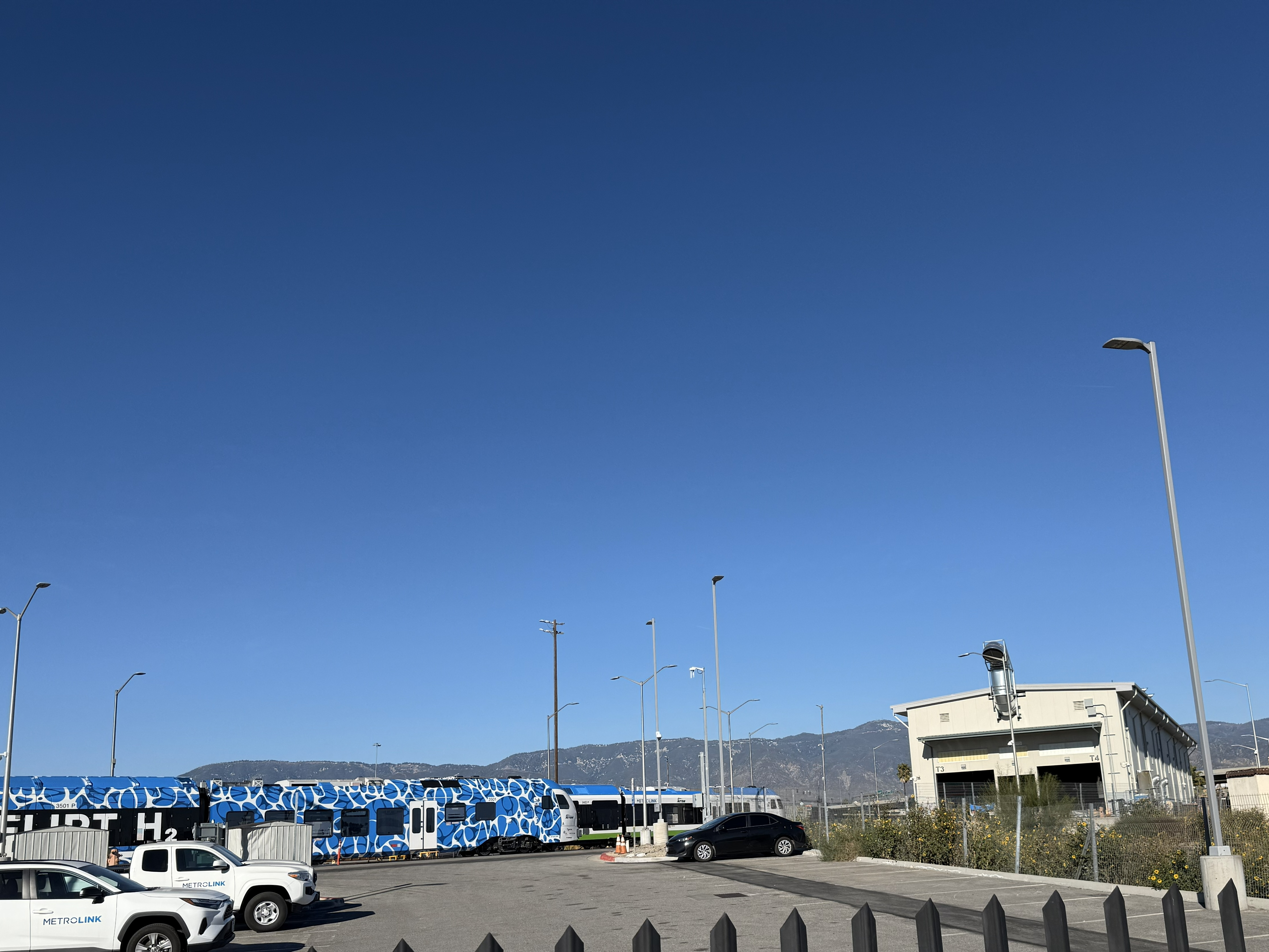
Arrow Maintenance Facility

Trains are stored and maintained at the Arrow Maintenance Facility (AMF), located east of the San Bernardino Depot and west of Interstate 215. The complex repurposes the former Inland Empire Maintenance Facility, which SBCTA opened in 2002 to service Metrolink locomotives and coaches until the opening of the Eastern Maintenance Facility. The site was redeveloped to support a fleet of up to six DMUs. The 15,000-square-foot (1,400 m^{2}) facility includes two maintenance bays, a maintenance pit, staff and crew office space, a machine shop, and material storage area. The project also includes a 1,800-square-foot (170 m^{2}) modular operations building, parts storage, fueling tracks, and space reserved for a future train washer.

The facility was later modified to accommodate the needs of ZEMU trainsets. The project added systems to meet safety requirements for hydrogen use, including spark-proof electrical wiring, upgraded HVAC systems, exterior battery charging stations, and hydrogen detection equipment, along with a new hydrogen refueling area and utility upgrades. Construction began in 2023, enabling full ZEMU operations to begin in 2025.

== History ==
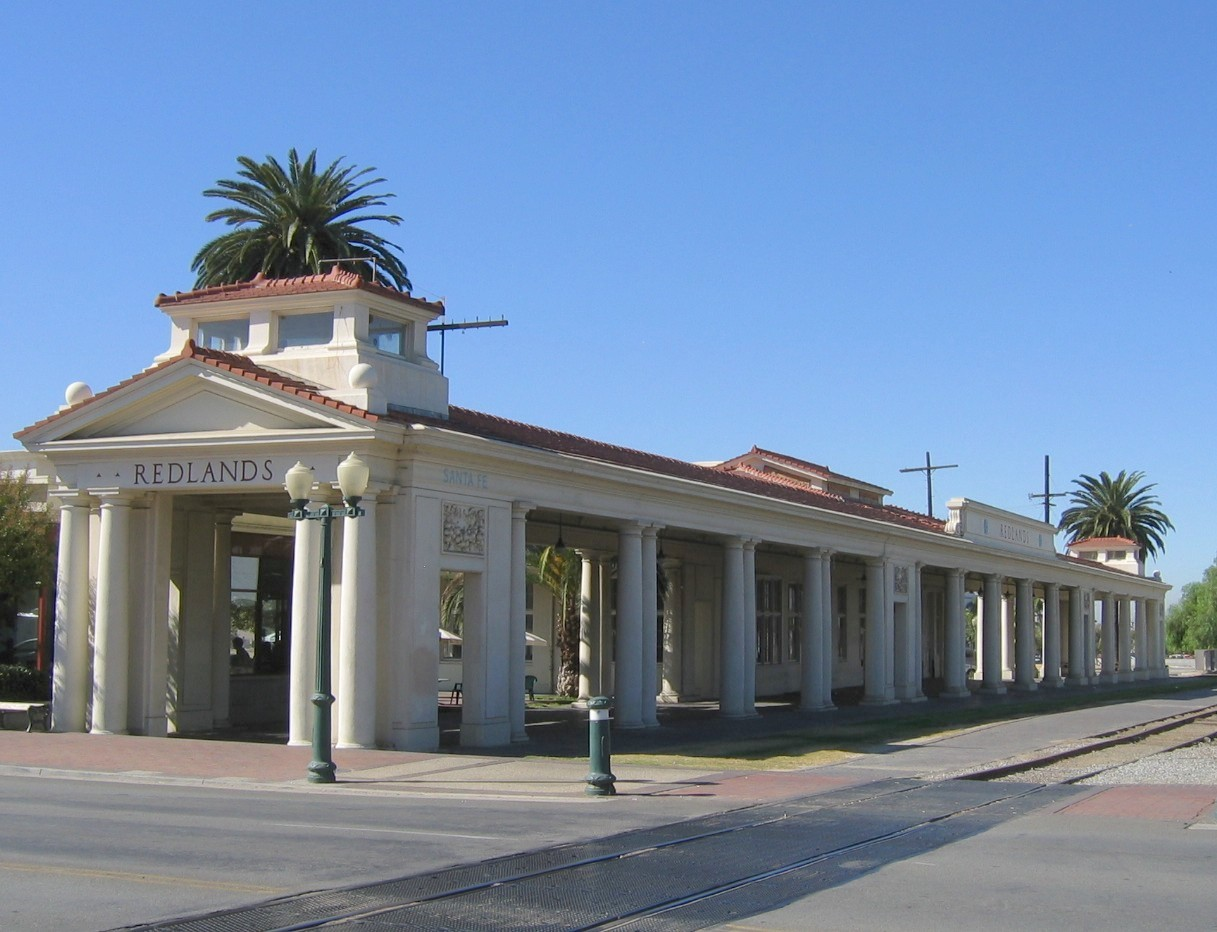
The historic Redlands Depot, the site of Redlands–Downtown station, in 2006 before Arrow construction

Redlands was previously served by the Pacific Electric (PE) "Red Car" trolley system and the Atchison, Topeka and Santa Fe Railway (ATSF). The PE's San Bernardino Line connected Redlands with Los Angeles from 1905 until its abandonment in 1937. Surviving infrastructure includes portions of the PE right-of-way, the ATSF's Redlands depot, and the Redlands Trolley Barn.

Proposals to restore passenger rail service between San Bernardino and Redlands date back to the 1990s, with initial plans targeting a 1995 launch. The projected start date was later postponed to 2013, 2015, and 2018. The project was originally known as the "Redlands Passenger Rail Project".

In September 2010, the San Bernardino Associated Governments (SANBAG) evaluated several options, including extending Metrolink trains to Redlands, establishing a standalone electrified or diesel train service, and bus alternatives. In April 2011, the agency chose to develop a standalone diesel train service using refurbished heavy rail equipment purchased second-hand from Metrolink, operating on 30-minute peak and hourly off-peak headways. Although SANBAG preferred an electrified light rail system, its estimated $268.1 million cost exceeded the $250 million cap for the federal Small Starts program that would have funded it. The selected option, estimated at $198.6 million, could be paid for using federal transportation grants based on population and sales tax revenues.

However, the plan to use conventional heavy rail equipment was met with community opposition over potential noise impacts. In 2015, SANBAG announced that the line would instead use smaller diesel multiple unit (DMU) railcars. The corridor was designed to allow conventional Metrolink trains to continue to Redlands depot.

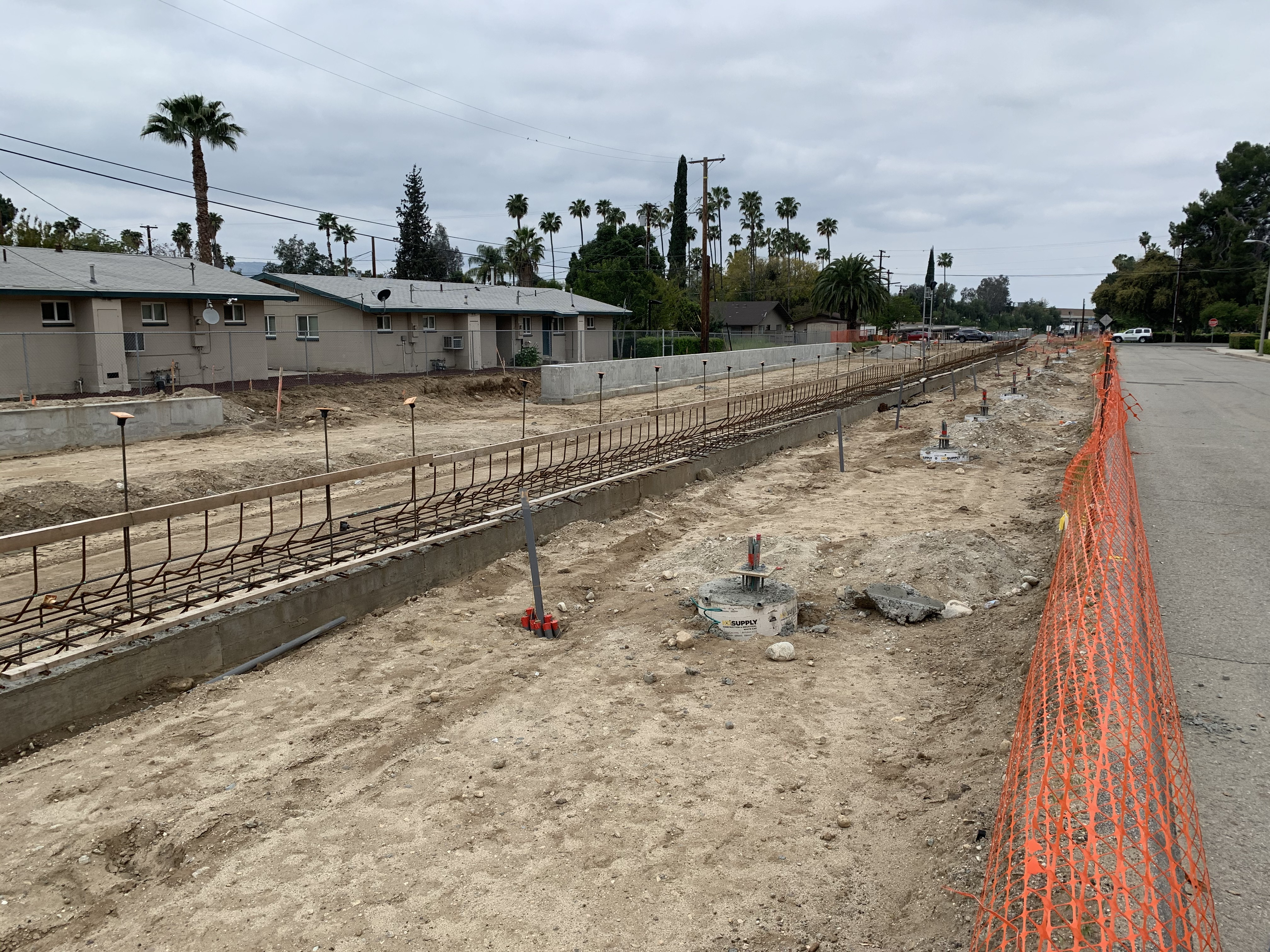
University station eastern terminus under construction, April 2020.

The initial plan called for four stations: two in Redlands at the historic depot and the University of Redlands, and two in San Bernardino at the downtown transit center and at Waterman Avenue near the Inland Regional Center. The Waterman stop was later replaced by a Tippecanoe Avenue station, citing expected higher ridership and security concerns following the 2015 attack at the center, along with local zoning changes. A third Redlands station near Esri's headquarters at New York Street was later added after the company offered funding for its construction.

On November 2, 2011, SANBAG awarded the first project contract to HDR, Inc. for engineering and environmental services. The contract amended an existing agreement for HDR’s work on the project to extend Metrolink's San Bernardino Line to the downtown transit center.

Construction faced multiple delays, including during the 2013 United States federal government shutdown, after which it was rescheduled for Fall 2016. By July 2016, construction was expected to begin in 2017 with service starting in 2020. The service was officially named Arrow in November 2016. Groundbreaking took place on July 19, 2019. The project included replacing all track along the line, rebuilding five bridges, and installing 24 grade crossings.

During planning, SANBAG and its successor agency, the San Bernardino County Transportation Authority (SBCTA), intended for the area’s public transit agency, Omnitrans, to oversee construction and later operate the line. By October 2019, however, Omnitrans was facing deficits that forced service reductions. Due to Omnitrans’ financial difficulties, SBCTA voted to transfer operations to Metrolink. That month, the route and stations were shown as an under-construction extension of the San Bernardino Line on Metrolink’s transit map.

After a little over three years of construction, ribbon cutting celebrations were held on Friday, October 21, 2022, and Arrow service began on Monday, October 24, 2022.

== Future development ==
Plans for future improvements to the line were drawn up during the planning process. They call for additional passing sidings to allow 15-minute peak period headways and 30-minute off-peak headways.

Service could potentially be extended/restored along the historic Redlands Loop around Highland and San Bernardino International Airport before returning to Downtown San Bernardino.
