= Redlands–Downtown station =

Train station in Redlands, California, US

Redlands–Downtown
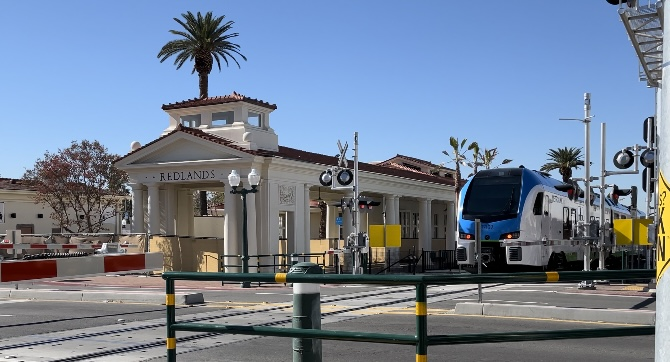
- Redlands–Downtown station in November 2022

General information
- Location: 351 North Orange Street; Redlands, California
- Coordinates: 34.059074°N 117.184517°W
- Owner: San Bernardino County Transportation Authority
- Line: Redlands Branch
- Platforms: 2 side platforms
- Tracks: 1
- Connections: Omnitrans: 8, 15, 19; Beaumont Transit: Commuter Link 125

Construction
- Parking: 385 spaces
- Cycle facilities: Parking station
- Accessible: Yes

History
- Opened: 1888
- Closed: 1938
- Rebuilt: 1910, 2022

Passengers
- FY 2026: 110 (avg. wkdy boardings)

Services
Preceding station	Metrolink	Following station
Redlands–Esri toward San Bernardino–Downtown	Arrow	Redlands–University Terminus
San Bernardino–Downtown toward L.A. Union Station	San Bernardino Line (limited weekday service)	Terminus
Former services
Preceding station	Atchison, Topeka and Santa Fe Railway	Following station
Drew clockwise	Redlands Loop	Mentone counter-clockwise
Location

Redlands–Downtown station is a train station serving downtown Redlands, California, United States. The station was originally built in 1910 for the Atchison, Topeka and Santa Fe Railway and operated until 1938. The facility was preserved and reopened on October 24, 2022 as part of the Arrow rail service.

== Service ==
Redlands–Downtown station is served by Metrolink's Arrow and San Bernardino Line services.

=== Hours and frequency ===
Arrow trains operate daily. On weekdays, service runs between approximately 4 am and 11 pm, with 30-minute frequencies during the early morning and evening peak periods and hourly service at other times. On weekends, trains operate between about 7:30 pm and 10 pm at hourly intervals, with three 1-hour gaps in service in the morning, afternoon, and evening.

Between 10 and 11 pm on weekend nights, trains run every 30 minutes between Redlands–Downtown and Redlands–University.

The station is also served by one weekday round trip on the San Bernardino Line, connecting Redlands–Downtown with Los Angeles Union Station.

=== Platforms ===
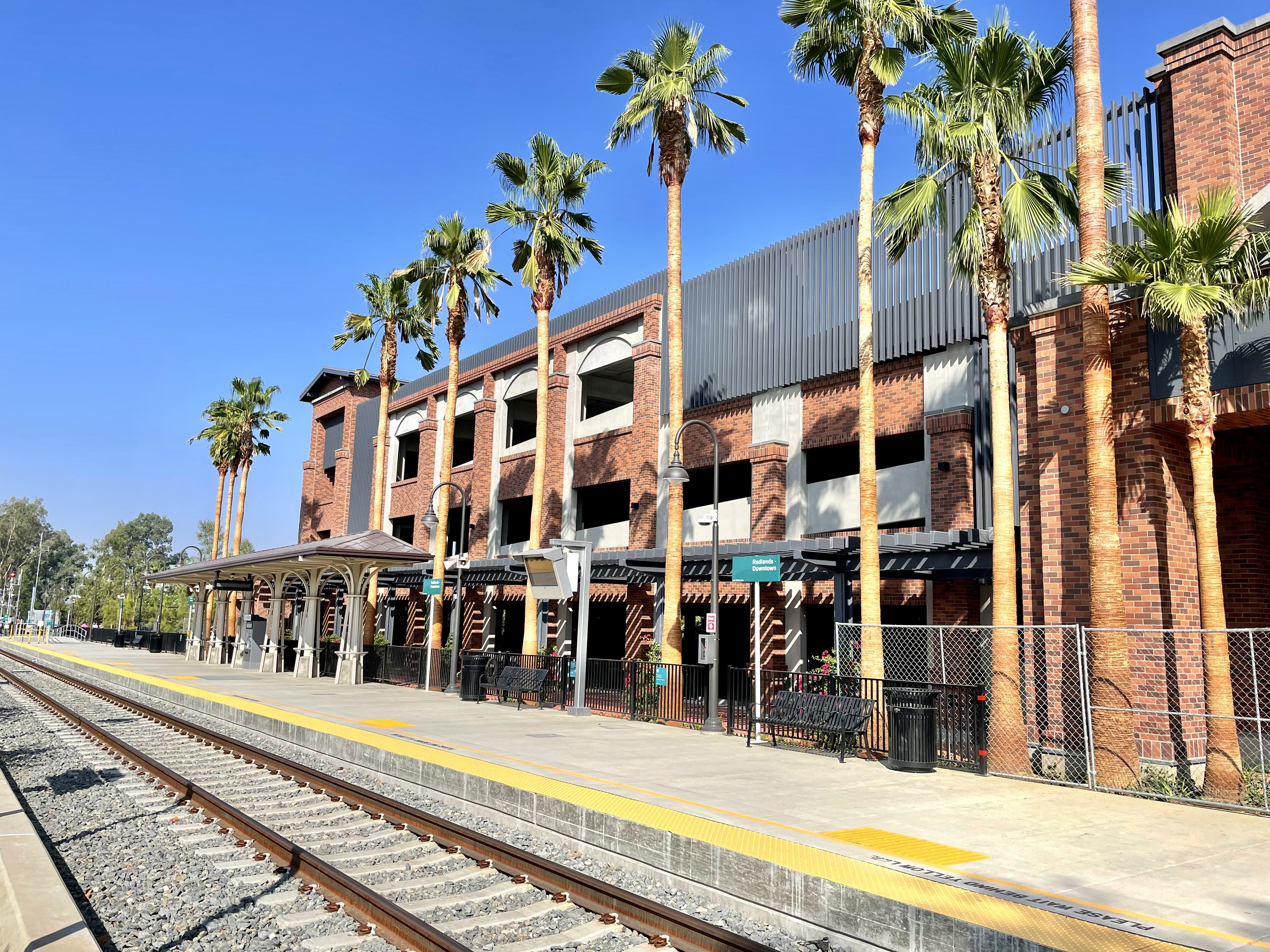
Metrolink platform with the four-level parking garage in the distance, Fall 2022

Although the station has a single main track, Metrolink and Arrow trains use separate platforms due to different boarding heights. Metrolink trains use the north platform adjacent to the parking structure, while Arrow trains use the south platform next to the historic Santa Fe Depot.

=== Parking ===
A four-level, 385-space parking structure was built north of the depot and opened in the summer of 2022. The garage has a bicycle parking station and electric car chargers, including a Tesla Supercharger location on the roof.

It replaces parking lost to the demolition of the Redlands Mall lot.

== Santa Fe Depot ==
The station is adjacent to the historic Redlands Santa Fe Railroad Depot, which is the centerpiece of the Redlands Santa Fe Depot District, a historic district. The original depot opened in 1888, but at the city’s urging it was replaced by the current structure, which entered service in April 1910. Pacific Electric's Red Car trolleys operated adjacent to the station along Orange Avenue until 1936. Mainline passenger service ended in 1938.

The building’s owner refurbished the depot in 2021 in anticipation of the return of rail service. While Arrow trains do not use the depot directly, new platforms and related facilities were constructed alongside the track.

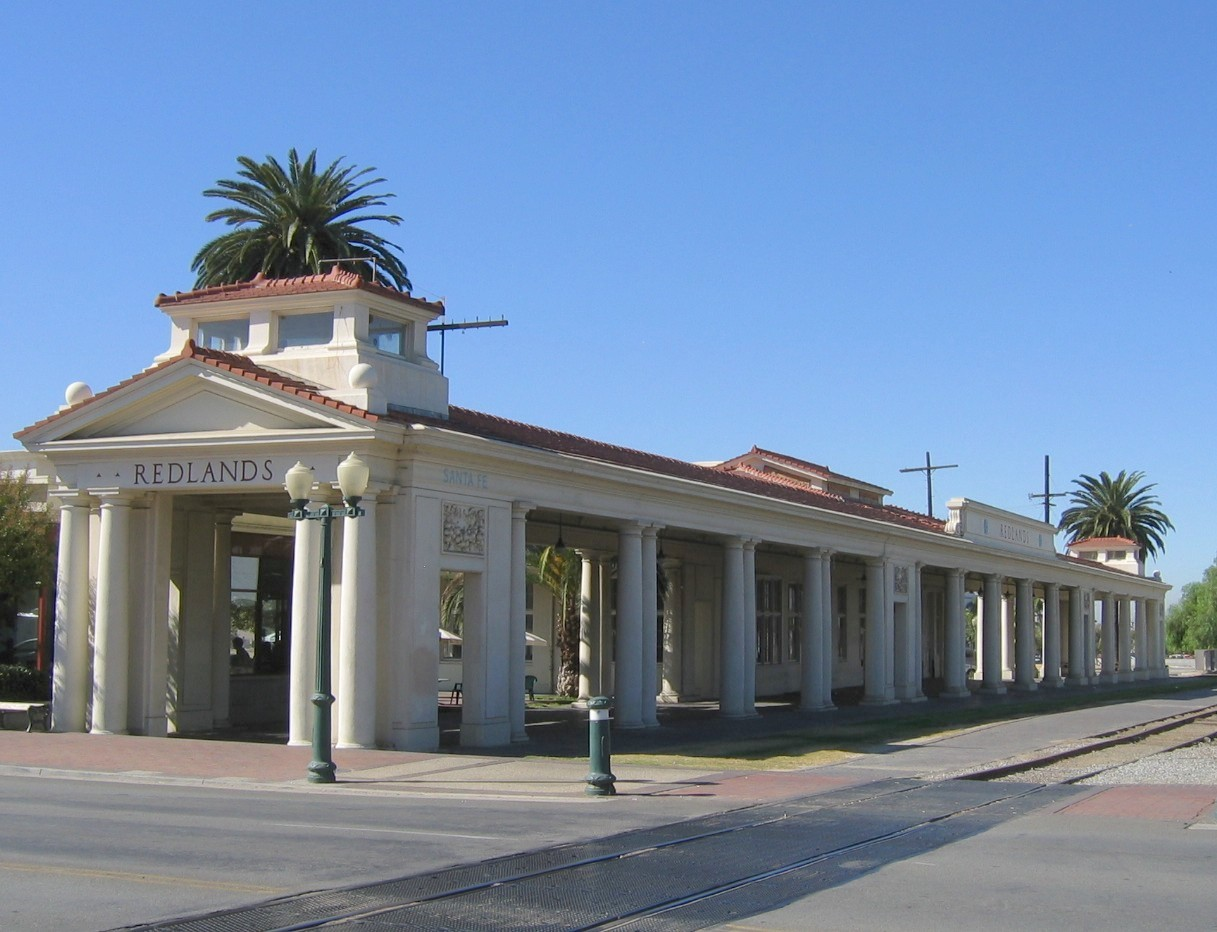
Historic station before adjacent Arrow construction

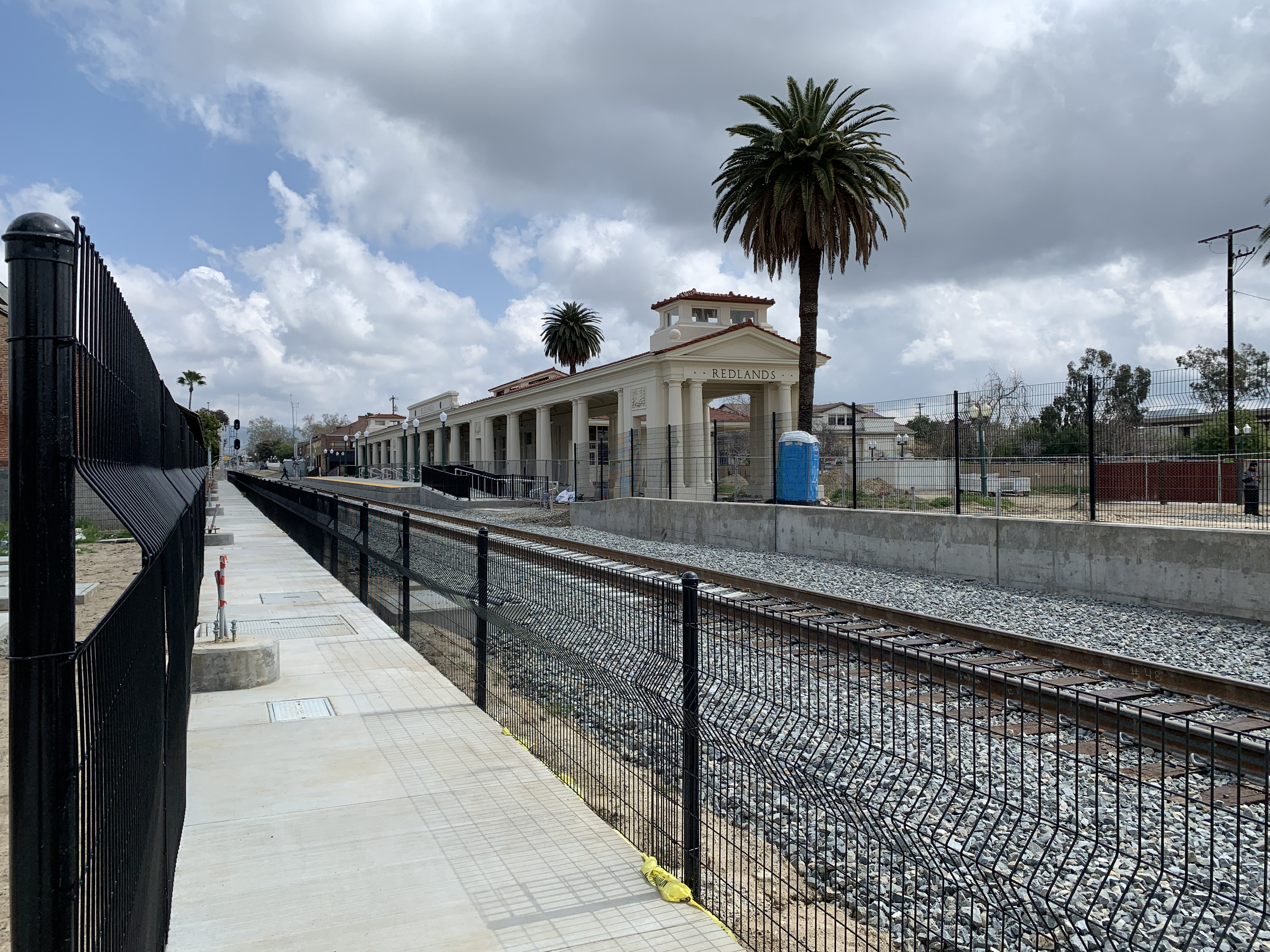
Redlands–Downtown station, under construction in March 2021

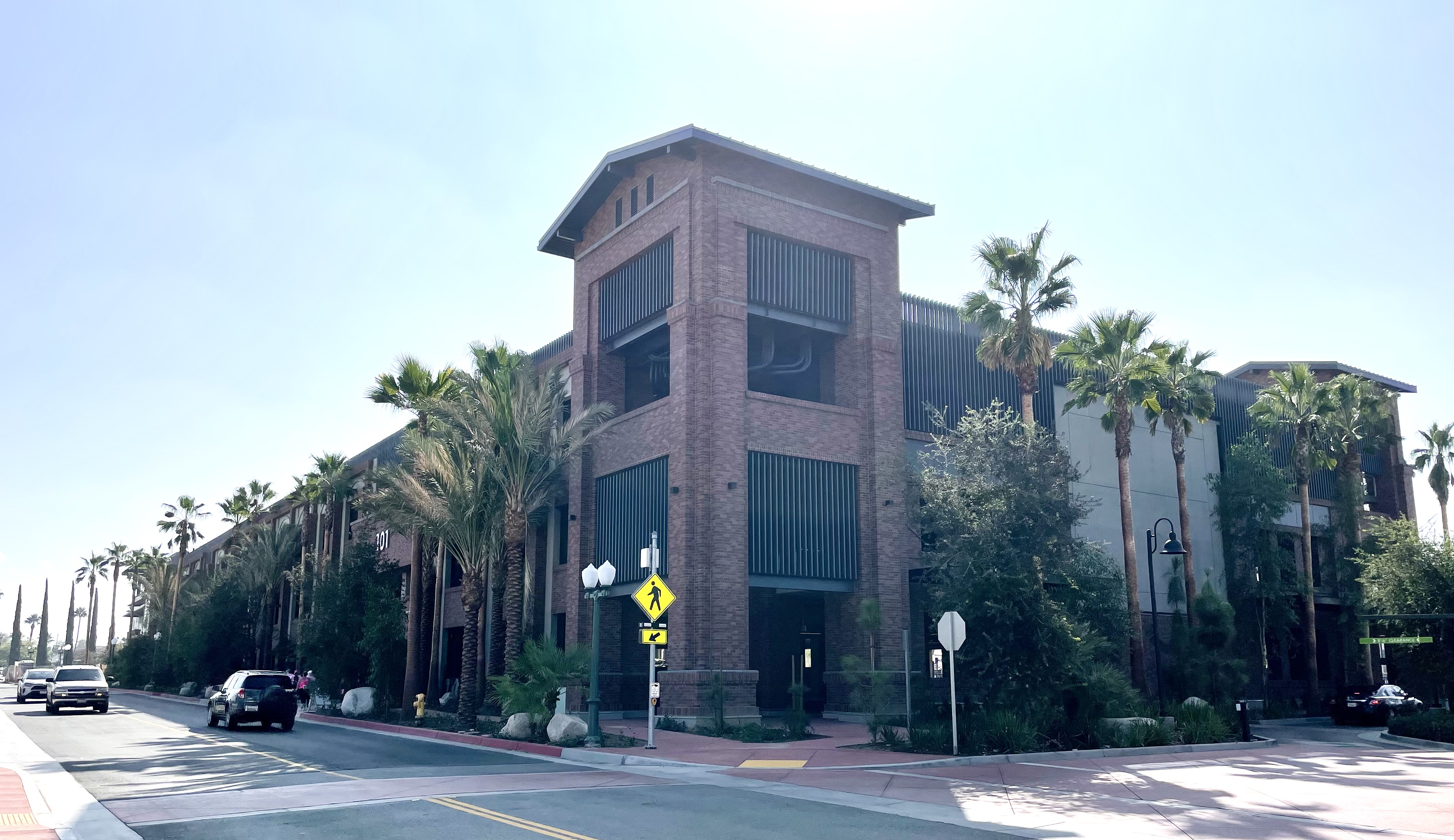
Station's four-level parking garage

== Notable Places Nearby ==
- Downtown Redlands / State Street
- Redlands Santa Fe Depot District
- Packing House District
- Redlands Public Market Food Hall
- Smiley Park Historic District
- Redlands Bowl
- Lincoln Memorial Shrine
- A. K. Smiley Public Library
- Redlands Glass Museum
- Museum of Redlands (opening 2025)
