= Redlands–University station =

Train station in Redlands, California

Redlands–University
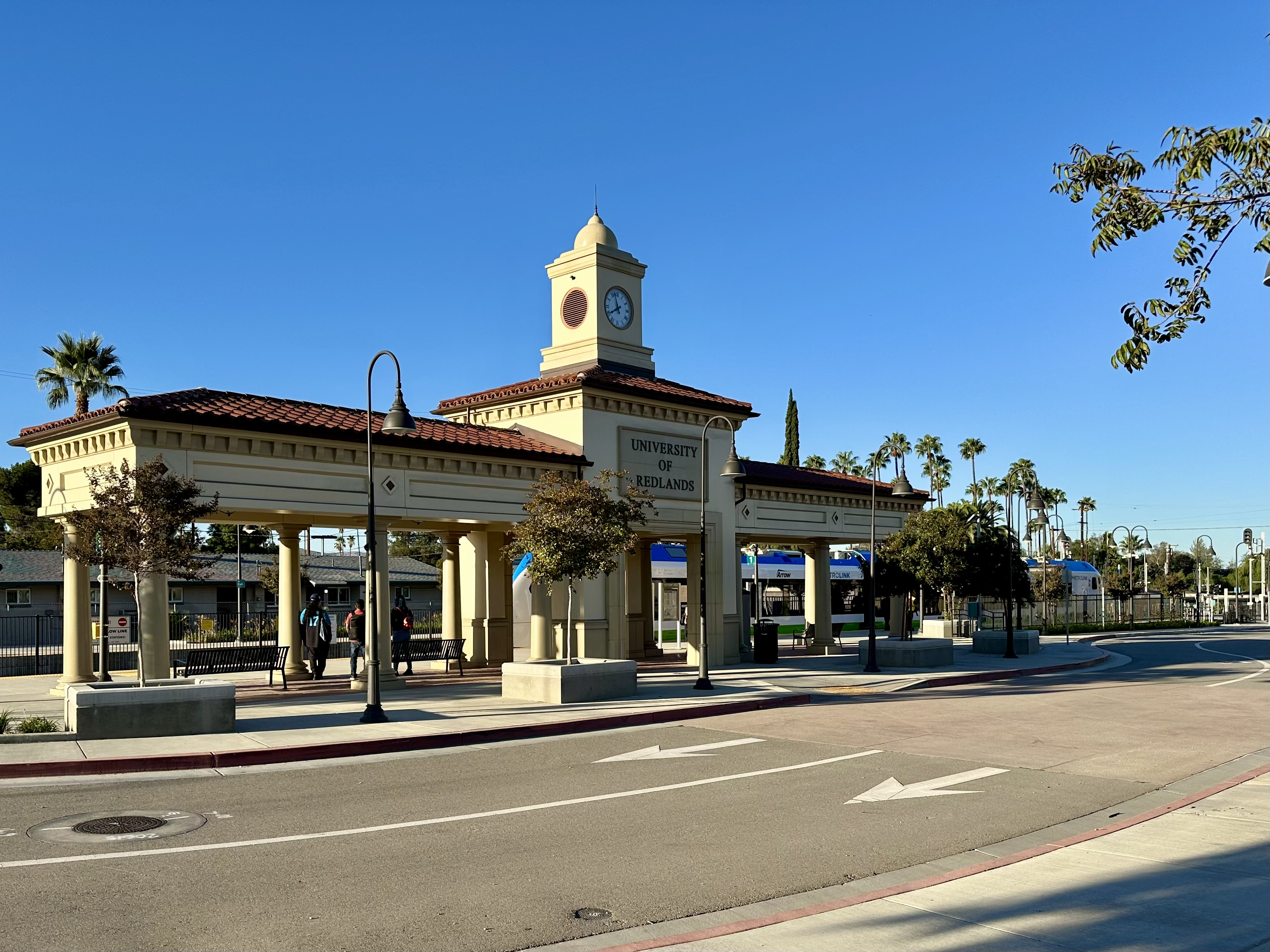
- Redlands–University station, October 2025

General information
- Location: 1100 East Park Avenue; Redlands, California
- Coordinates: 34.058872°N 117.165729°W
- Owner: San Bernardino County Transportation Authority
- Line: Redlands Branch
- Platforms: 2 side platforms
- Tracks: 2

Construction
- Parking: 100 spaces
- Accessible: Yes

History
- Opened: October 24, 2022

Passengers
- FY 2026: 118 (avg. wkdy boardings)

Services
| Preceding station | Metrolink | Following station |
|---|---|---|
| Redlands–Downtown toward San Bernardino–Downtown | Arrow | Terminus |
Location

Redlands–University station is a terminus station on the Arrow rail service that serves the University of Redlands. The station was built as part of the Arrow service and opened on October 24, 2022.

== Location ==
It is located alongside East Park Avenue at its intersection with North University Street on the southwest corner of the University of Redlands campus. Station construction was largely completed in 2021, and opened for revenue service with the system on October 24, 2022. The station has 100 park and ride spaces available for customers.

East of the station, the rail right of way continues as a multi-use recreation path called the Orange Blossom Trail. As of 2017, the University was planning to construct a transit village at the site via a public–private partnership.

== Service ==
Arrow trains operate daily. On weekdays, service runs between approximately 4 am and 11 pm, with 30-minute frequencies during the early morning and evening peak periods and hourly service at other times. On weekends, trains operate between about 7:30 pm and 10 pm at hourly intervals, with three 1-hour gaps in service in the morning, afternoon, and evening.

Between 10 and 11 pm on weekend nights, trains run every 30 minutes between Redlands–Downtown and Redlands–University.
