= Omnitrans =

Public transport agency in California, US

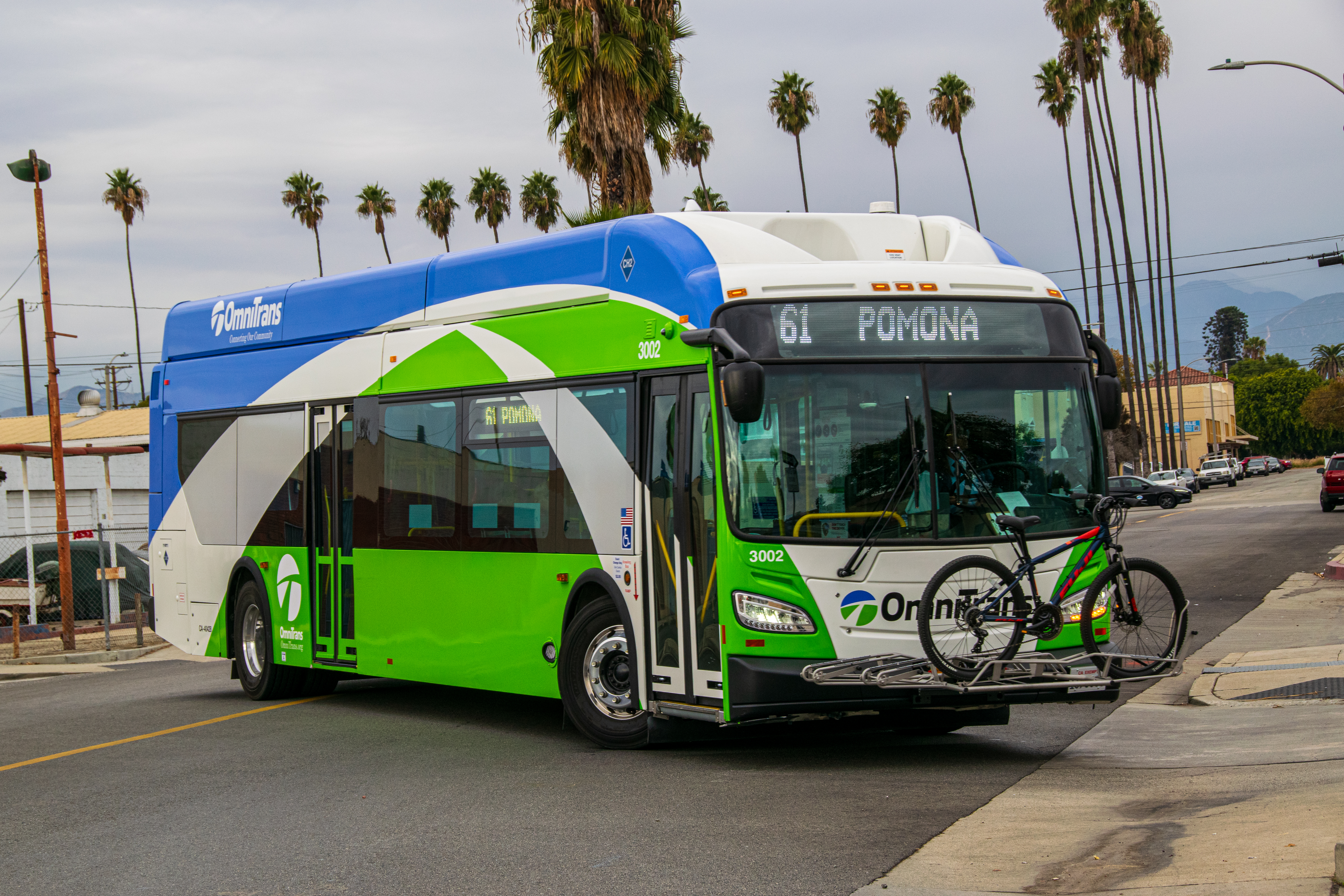
- Parent: Omnitrans Joint Powers Authority
- Founded: 1976
- Headquarters: 1700 West Fifth Street; San Bernardino, California
- Service area: San Bernardino Valley
- Service type: Bus, bus rapid transit, paratransit
- Routes: 28
- Hubs: San Bernardino Transit Center; Fontana station; Montclair Transit Center; Chino Transit Center; Riverside Vine Street Hub
- Stations: 16 BRT
- Fleet: 168 total: 136 CNG 18 more CNG are on order for 2026; 28 electric 17 more EV buses are on order for 2026; 4 hydrogen fuel cell
- Daily ridership: 25,600 (weekdays, Q1 2026)
- Annual ridership: 7,685,500 (2025)
- Fuel type: CNG, battery electric, hydrogen fuel cell
- Operator: Transdev (paratransit)
- Chief executive: Erin Rogers
- Website: omnitrans.org

Omnitrans is a public transportation agency serving the San Bernardino Valley in San Bernardino County, California. Omnitrans was established in 1976, and is organized as a joint powers authority. It serves 15 cities in the urbanized southwestern portion of San Bernardino County, providing local bus, bus rapid transit, paratransit and microtransit services. The Omnitrans service area covers approximately 480 square miles (1,200 km^{2}).

In 2025, the system had a ridership of 7,685,500 or about 25,600 per weekday as of the first quarter of 2026.

== History ==
In October 2019, Omnitrans faced increasing deficits and reduced service. They plan to cut service by 11 percent. They were the operator for the Arrow commuter rail service between San Bernardino and Redlands. the San Bernardino County Transportation Authority Transit Committee voted to transfer the operation and construction duties to the Southern California Regional Rail Authority.

The Transit Committee, announced that it would launch a study considering “complete consolidation” of Omnitrans under the SBCTA due to a $520 million fiscal deficit over the next 20 years. However, in 2021, SBCTA decided against the consolidation of Omnitrans due to the results of a commissioned study. That indicated, that due to state law, SBCTA was required to pay off the agency's unfunded pension liability, at a one-time cost of between $100 million to $174 million. Instead, SBCTA opted to provide $100 million to Omnitrans to keep it viable through 2040.

On February 27, 2020, it was announced that Omnitrans placed a new order for four forty-foot, battery-electric Xcelsior CHARGE™ heavy-duty transit buses.

On March 1, 2023, the Omnitrans Board of Directors approved the purchase of four new Flyer Fuel Cell buses.

=== Former Services ===
==== OmniLink ====
Omnitrans formerly operated OmniLink, a demand-response service that operated in Yucaipa and Chino Hills. OmniLink ceased operation on August 29, 2014.

SBConnect

Omnitrans formerly operated the SBConnect, a service funded by the SBCTA. This was a first/last mile shuttle from the San Bernardino Transit Center looping around the civic center serving the nearby San Bernardino County Supreme Court and county offices. On August 11, 2025, the shuttle service was discontinued to low ridership. The resources allocated to SBConnect were diverted to ONTConnect.

== Future ==
On May 15, 2025, the Omnitrans Board of Directors approved the purchase of eighteen forty-foot New Flyer CNG buses. Later in 2025, Omnitrans approved the purchase of sixteen sixty-foot New Flyer Battery-Electric buses to replace the current fleet of sbX Green Line buses.

Despite being delayed, Omnitrans' sbX Purple Line Bus Rapid Transit (BRT) service from the Pomona Transit Center in Los Angeles County to Victoria Gardens in Rancho Cucamonga will open in early 2027. This will be Omnitrans' second BRT and will be serving top destinations such as Ontario International Airport, Ontario Mills, Toyota Arena and Victoria Gardens. This BRT is set to debut a fully zero emissions fleet from its launch.

== Bus Routes ==
=== Local routes ===
Route	Terminals		Via	Division/Garage	Notes
1	Colton; Arrowhead Regional Medical Center	San Bernardino; Lynwood Dr & Victoria Av	Valley Bl, S. Mt. Vernon Av, Pacific St	East Valley	Serves San Bernardino Valley College and San Bernardino Transit Center
2	San Bernardino; Palm Park & Ride	Loma Linda; VA Hospital	Kendall Dr, E St	East Valley	Serves Cal State San Bernardino, Inland Center and San Bernardino Transit Center
3	San Bernardino; San Bernardino Transit Center		Baseline St, Highland Av	East Valley	Counter-clockwise route
4	San Bernardino; San Bernardino Transit Center		Baseline St, Highland Av	East Valley	Clockwise route
6	San Bernardino; Cal State San Bernardino	San Bernardino; San Bernardino Transit Center	Northpark Bl, Sierra Wy	East Valley	
8	San Bernardino; San Bernardino Transit Center	Yucaipa; Crafton Hills College	Tippecanoe Av, Redlands Bl, Lugonia Av	East Valley	Serves San Bernardino–Tippecanoe and Redlands–Downtown stations; Selected weekday-only trips serve the Amazon Fulfillment Center ONT2 and Sortation Center ONT5.
10	San Bernardino; San Bernardino Transit Center	Fontana Fontana Transit Center	Baseline St	East Valley	
14	San Bernardino; San Bernardino Transit Center	Fontana Fontana Transit Center	Foothill Bl	East Valley	
15	Redlands; Redlands–Downtown Station	Fontana Fontana Transit Center	Orange St, Merrill Av	East Valley	Selected trips serve the Amazon Air Freight Fulfillment Center KSBD.; Serves Citrus Plaza, San Bernardino International Airport, and San Bernardino Transit Center
19	Yucaipa; Yucaipa Transit Center	Fontana Fontana Transit Center	Citrus Av, Barton Rd, San Bernardino Av	East Valley	Serves Crafton Hills College
22	Colton; Arrowhead Regional Medical Center	Rialto; Alder Av & Casa Grande Dr	Riverside Av	East Valley	
61	Pomona; Pomona Transit Center	Fontana Fontana Transit Center	Holt Av, San Bernardino Av	West Valley	Serves Ontario International Airport and Ontario Mills
66	Montclair; Montclair Transit Center	Fontana Fontana Transit Center	Foothill Bl	West Valley	Serves Montclair Place
81	Rancho Cucamonga; Chaffey College	Ontario; Ontario–East station	Haven Av	West Valley	Serves Ontario Mills.: No Sunday Service
82	Rancho Cucamonga; Foothill Bl & Day Creek Bl (weekday only)	North Fontana; Summit Av & Lytle Creek Rd	Milliken Av, Jurupa Av, Sierra Wy	West Valley	Serves Rancho Cucamonga station, Ontario Mills (weekdays) and Fontana Transit Center
82	Fontana; Banana Av & Cherry Av	North Fontana; Summit Av & Lytle Creek Rd	Milliken Av, Jurupa Av, Sierra Wy	West Valley	Serves Rancho Cucamonga station, Ontario Mills (weekdays) and Fontana Transit Center
83	Chino; Chino Transit Center	Upland; Euclid Av & Foothill Bl	Euclid Av	West Valley	Serves Ontario and Upland stations
84	Chino; Chino Transit Center	Montclair; Montclair Transit Center	Mountain Av	West Valley	
85	Chino; Chino Transit Center	Rancho Cucamonga; Chaffey College	Central Av, Arrow Hwy, Arrow Rte	West Valley	Serves Montclair Place and Montclair Transit Center
87	Rancho Cucamonga; Chaffey College	Eastvale; Amazon Eastvale LGB3	19th St, Ontario Ranch Rd	West Valley	Serves Ontario station.: No Sunday Service
88	Chino Hills; Gran Av & City Center Dr	Montclair; Montclair Transit Center	Ramona Av	West Valley	Serves Montclair Place

=== Bus Rapid Transit ===
Route	Terminals		Via	Division/Garage	Notes
sbX Green Line	San Bernardino; Palm Park & Ride	Loma Linda; VA Hospital	Kendall Dr, E Street	East Valley	No Sunday Service
sbX Purple Line	Pomona; Pomona Transit Center	Rancho Cucamonga; Victoria Gardens	Holt Bl	West Valley	Opening Spring 2027

=== Freeway Express Routes ===
Route	Terminals		Via	Division/Garage	Notes
215	San Bernardino; San Bernardino Transit Center	Riverside; Riverside–Downtown station	I-215	East Valley	
290	San Bernardino; San Bernardino Transit Center	Montclair; Montclair Transit Center	I-10, I-215	East Valley	No Weekend Service

=== Shuttle routes ===
These fixed route services are contracted to Transdev and operate "mini-buses"; some as the 380 ONTConnect and former 300 operated as last/first mile connections from Metrolink stations. The other routes are a mix of former routes once directly operated by Omnitrans designed to offer mobility for areas with relatively low population and employment density.

Route	Terminals		Via	Notes
305	San Bernardino; San Bernardino Transit Center	Grand Terrace; Barton Rd & Town Square	Waterman Av	
312	San Bernardino; Cal State San Bernardino	Fontana; Fontana Transit Center	Linden Av	
319	Yucaipa; Yucaipa Transit Center		5th St, California St	North Loop
319	Yucaipa; Yucaipa Transit Center		Bryant St	South Loop
367	Rancho Cucamonga; Chaffey College	Fontana; Fontana Transit Center	Baseline Rd	Weekdays Only
380	Rancho Cucamonga; Rancho Cucamonga Station	Ontario; Ontario International Airport	Haven Av	

=== OmniAccess ADA Service ===
Access provides public transportation services for persons who are physically or cognitively unable to use regular bus service (ADA certified and/or Omnitrans Disability Identification Card holders). Access operates curb-to-curb service with minibuses or vans, complementing the Omnitrans fixed-route bus system. The Access service area is defined as up to 3/4 mile (1.2 km) on either side of an existing fixed route. Service is available on the same days and at the same times that fixed-route services operate.

=== OmniRide ===
OmniRide is a microtransit service that serves Bloomington, Chino, Chino Hills, and Upland. Rides are $4 per ride and include a day pass to transfer onto any Omnitrans fixed route on the same day of travel. Discounted fares of $1 are available to Veterans and Disabled/Seniors/Medicare. OmniRide in Chino, Chino Hills, and Upland service is available weekdays from 6 AM to 8 PM. OmniRide Bloomington is available seven days a week from 5 AM to 10 PM.
