= San Bernardino Line =

Commuter rail line in Southern California

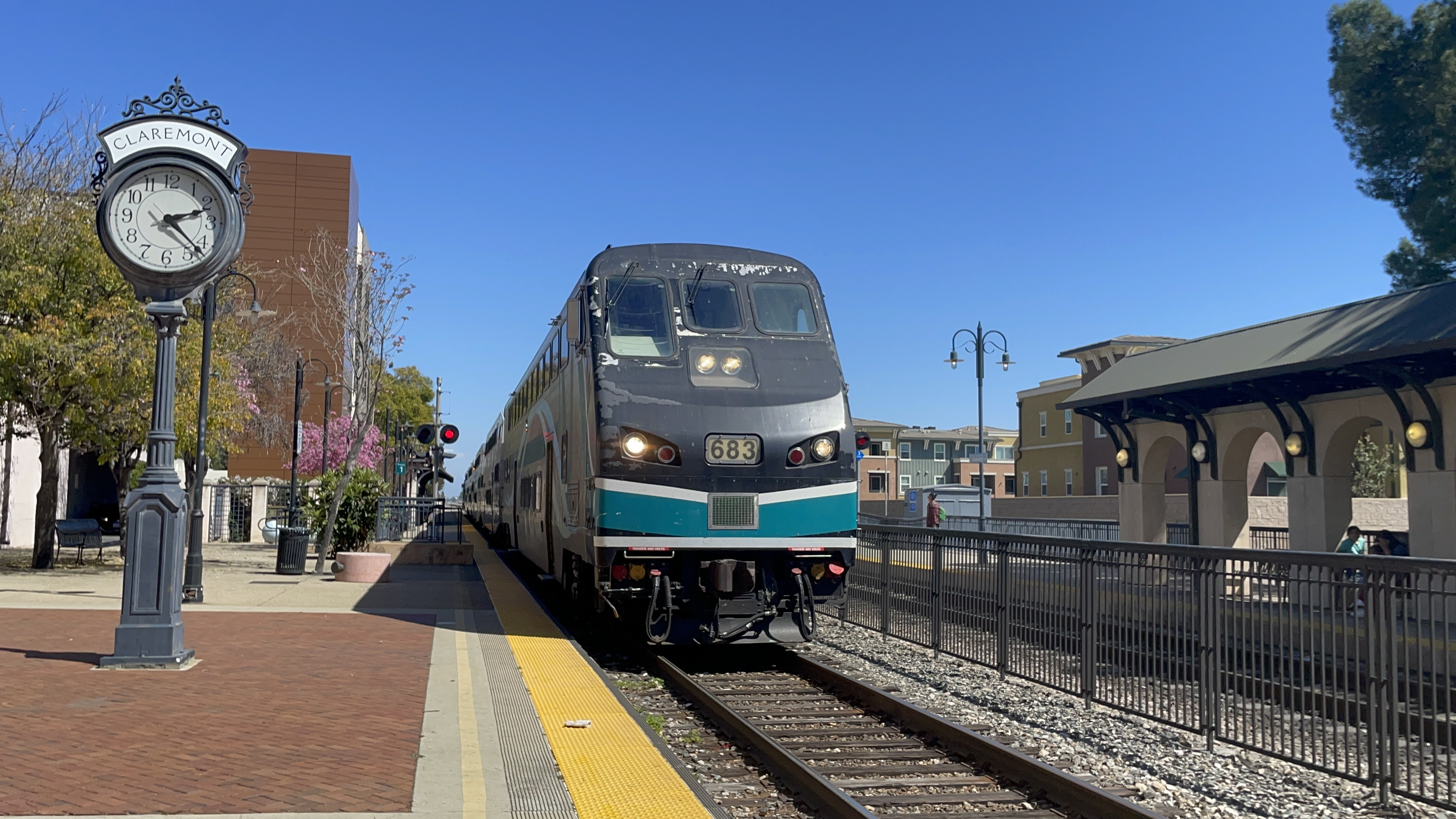
- Claremont station with L.A bound train apporcing

Overview
- Locale: Greater Los Angeles Area and Inland Empire
- Termini: L.A. Union Station; San Bernardino–Downtown
- Stations: 16

Service
- Type: Commuter rail
- System: Metrolink
- Operator: Metrolink
- Daily ridership: 6,897 (weekdays, Q3 2025)

History
- Opened: October 26, 1992

Technical
- Line length: 57.6 miles (92.7 km)
- Character: Elevated and surface-level
- Track gauge: 4 ft 8 1/2 in (1,435 mm) standard gauge
- Operating speed: 79 mph (127 km/h)
Route map
San Bernardino Line highlighted in brown

The San Bernardino Line is a Metrolink line running between Downtown Los Angeles east through the San Gabriel Valley and the Inland Empire to San Bernardino, with limited service to Redlands. It is one of the three initial lines on the original Metrolink system, along with the Santa Clarita Line (now the Antelope Valley Line) and the Ventura County Line.

As of January 2025, the line has 44 weekday trips (22 in each direction) with most trips operating between Los Angeles Union Station in the west and the San Bernardino Transit Center to the east, however 5 trips are short turns that only operate as far east as the Montclair Transit Center and 1 trip is extended past San Bernardino to serve Redlands–Downtown station. It was the first Metrolink line to run on both Saturday and Sunday, with 16 weekend trips (8 in each direction) operating between Los Angeles and San Bernardino. With daily ridership at 6,897 as of 2025, it is Metrolink's busiest line.

== Route ==
The line is owned by Metrolink. After leaving Union Station and crossing the Los Angeles River, the line follows the San Bernardino Freeway and El Monte Busway until just after the Cal State L.A. station; it then runs in the median of the San Bernardino Freeway to the El Monte Station along the former route of the Pacific Electric Railway's San Bernardino Line. Starting at El Monte, the line parallels the Union Pacific's Sunset Route (ex-Southern Pacific) for a few miles before turning northeast at Bassett (Note: 34.0507°N 117.9971°W) onto a Southern Pacific branch. At the former Southern Pacific/Pacific Electric-Santa Fe crossing, (Note: 34.0939°N 117.7303°W) it switches to the Santa Fe route; from Claremont to just west of San Bernardino it follows what was the Santa Fe's Pasadena Subdivision (and before that the Second District of the LA Division, the Santa Fe passenger main line). From San Bernardino Depot, the line follows the Santa Fe's Redlands branch line towards Downtown Redlands. The San Bernardino Line is mostly single track with seven passing sidings and short sections of double track near Covina, between Pomona and Montclair, west of Fontana, and throughout San Bernardino.

== History ==
Los Angeles County Transportation Commission acquired the Southern Pacific Railroad Burbank Branch in 1992. When the line opened on October 26, 1992, service extended only as far as Pomona. It was incrementally extended to Claremont that December, Montclair the following February, then finally to San Bernardino in May 1993. Saturday service was added in 1997 and Sunday service in 1998 making it the first Metrolink line to offer weekend service.

San Bernardino Associated Governments (SANBAG) completed an environmental impact report (EIR) in 2015 to extend Metrolink service southeast from the current eastern terminus in San Bernardino to Redlands. The extension follows the 9-mile (14 km) Redlands Subdivision and comprises two projects.

The Downtown San Bernardino Passenger Rail Project extended Metrolink southeast one mile via double trackage to a new terminus at the San Bernardino Transit Center. The project's groundbreaking was in February 2014; at that time, the extension was expected to be completed by mid-2016. As of September 2015, the completion date had been extended to 2017. Construction work on the extension continued through March and April 2017. Test trains began running on the tracks in April 2017. This phase of the project opened to the public on December 16, 2017.

Arrow is a rail extension to Redlands. By December 2015, SANBAG decided that this second phase of the project, from the San Bernardino Transit Center to Redlands, would no longer be a Metrolink extension, but rather an independent system. SANBAG planned to use diesel multiple units (DMUs) and have Omnitrans operate the system. However, San Bernardino Line express limited-stop trains would run on part of the extension, to a new station near the Downtown Redlands station. Construction was planned to begin in 2017, however groundbreaking took place in July 2019 with a 2022 opening. The selected route runs between the Downtown San Bernardino station and the University of Redlands with stops at Tippecanoe Avenue, Esri, and Downtown Redlands, adjacent to the Redlands Santa Fe Depot. Omnitrans was removed as the system's operator in 2019 amid mounting deficits, and Metrolink took over construction and procurement. Arrow opened on October 24, 2022. Arrow's DMU sets have been studied for wider deployment on the rest of the San Bernardino Line. The rolling stock is the new EMD F125, and others were MPI MPXpress, EMD F59PH, and some cab cars.

== Future development ==
The Los Angeles County Metropolitan Transportation Authority (LA Metro) has plans to add the current LA General Medical Center station on the El Monte Busway as an infill station to the line. This would involve building a second track and center platform. The cost of this project is estimated between $51 million and $110 million. Currently, westbound Metrolink passengers must exit at the Cal State LA station and take any of the westbound buses one stop to the Medical Center.

== Stations ==
The San Bernardino Line has 15 full-time stations and one for special events.

Station	Connections	Address	City	County
Redlands-Downtown (limited weekday service)	Metrolink: Arrow	351 North Orange Street, Redlands, CA 92374	Redlands	San Bernardino County
San Bernardino-Downtown	Metrolink: Arrow Inland Empire–Orange County; Omnitrans: SbX	599 West Rialto Avenue, San Bernardino, CA 92401	San Bernardino	San Bernardino County
San Bernardino-Depot	Metrolink: Inland Empire–Orange County; Amtrak: Southwest Chief	1170 West 3rd Street, San Bernardino, CA 92410	San Bernardino	San Bernardino County
Rialto		292 South Palm Avenue, Rialto, CA 92376	Rialto	San Bernardino County
Fontana		16777 Orange Way, Fontana, CA 92335	Fontana	San Bernardino County
Rancho Cucamonga	Omnitrans: ONT Connect to ONT	11208 Azusa Court, Rancho Cucamonga, CA 91730	Rancho Cucamonga	San Bernardino County
Upland		300 East A Street, Upland, CA 91786	Upland	San Bernardino County
Montclair		5091 Richton Street, Montclair, CA 91763	Montclair	San Bernardino County
Claremont		110 West 1st Street, Claremont, CA 91711	Claremont	Los Angeles County
Pomona-North	Metro: A Line	205 Santa Fe Street, Pomona, CA 91767	Pomona	Los Angeles County
Fairplex (fair days only)		2284 East Arrow Highway, La Verne, CA 91750	La Verne	Los Angeles County
Covina		600 North Citrus Avenue, Covina, CA 91723	Covina	Los Angeles County
Baldwin Park		3825 Downing Avenue, Baldwin Park, CA 91706	Baldwin Park	Los Angeles County
El Monte		10925 Railroad Street, El Monte, CA 91731	El Monte	Los Angeles County
Cal State LA	Metro: J Line	5150 State University Drive, Los Angeles, CA 90032	Los Angeles	Los Angeles County
Los Angeles Union Station	Metrolink: 91/Perris Valley Antelope Valley Orange County Riverside Ventura County; Amtrak: Coast Starlight, Pacific Surfliner, Southwest Chief, Sunset Limited, Texas Eagle; Metro: A Line B Line D Line J Line; FlyAway to LAX	800 North Alameda Street, Los Angeles, CA 90012	Los Angeles	Los Angeles County

There was a station stop for race days for the Auto Club Speedway until it closed in 2023
