= Metrolink (California) =

Regional commuter rail system in Southern California

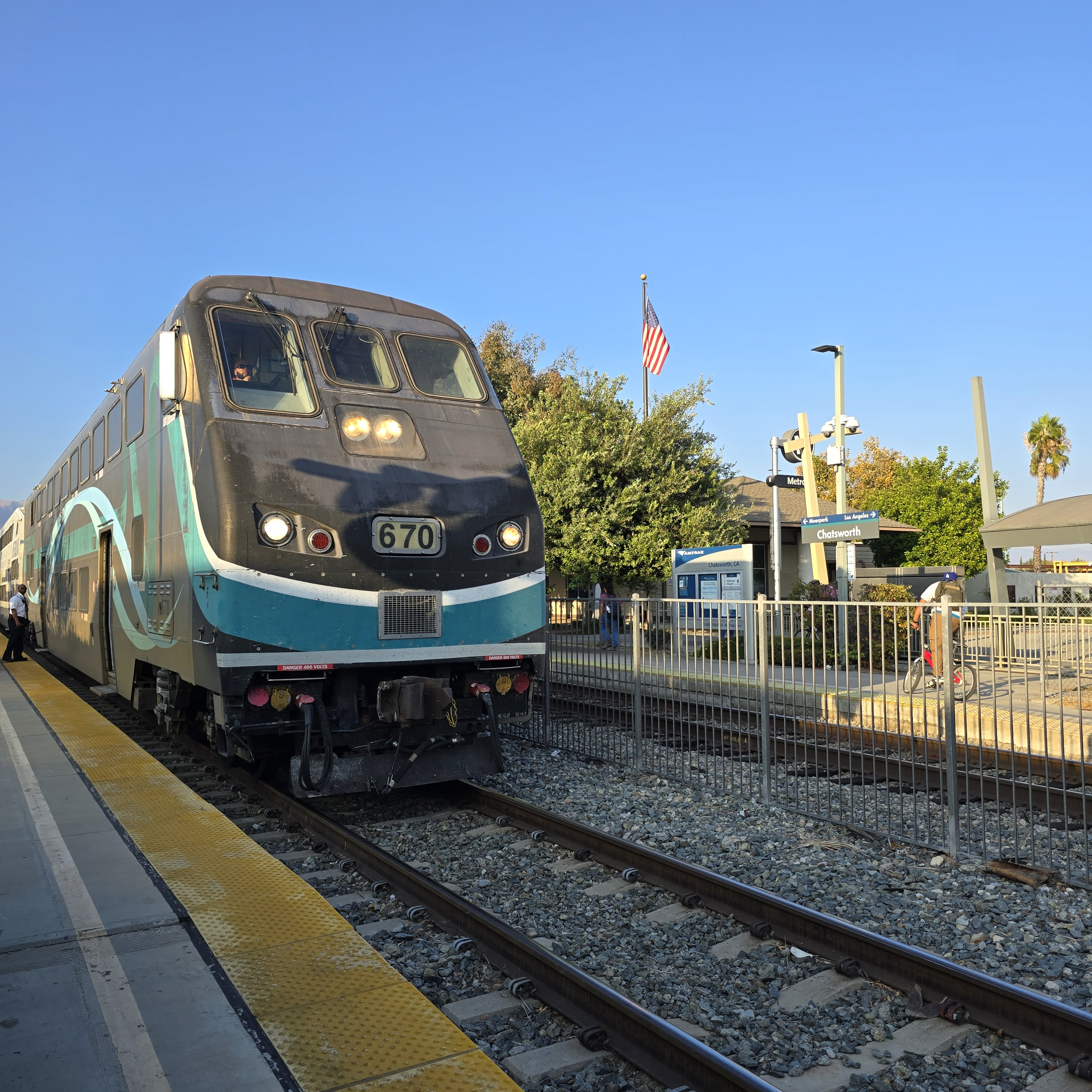
- A Metrolink train stopped at Chatsworth station

Overview
- Locale: Southern California
- Transit type: Commuter rail
- Number of lines: 8
- Number of stations: 68
- Daily ridership: 20,700 (weekdays, Q2 2026)
- Annual ridership: 6,063,500 (2025)
- Chief executive: Darren Kettle
- Headquarters: Wilshire Grand Center; Los Angeles, California
- Website: metrolinktrains.com

Operation
- Began operation: October 26, 1992; 34 years ago
- Operator: Alstom
- Reporting marks: SCAX
- Infrastructure managers: Southern California Regional Rail Authority; BNSF Railway; North County Transit District; Union Pacific Railroad
- Number of vehicles: 60 locomotives, 274 rail cars, 3 DMU vehicles (Arrow), 1 ZEMU vehicle (Arrow)

Technical
- System length: 545.6 mi (878.1 km)
- Track gauge: 4 ft 8 1/2 in (1,435 mm) standard gauge
- Top speed: 90 mph (140 km/h)
System map
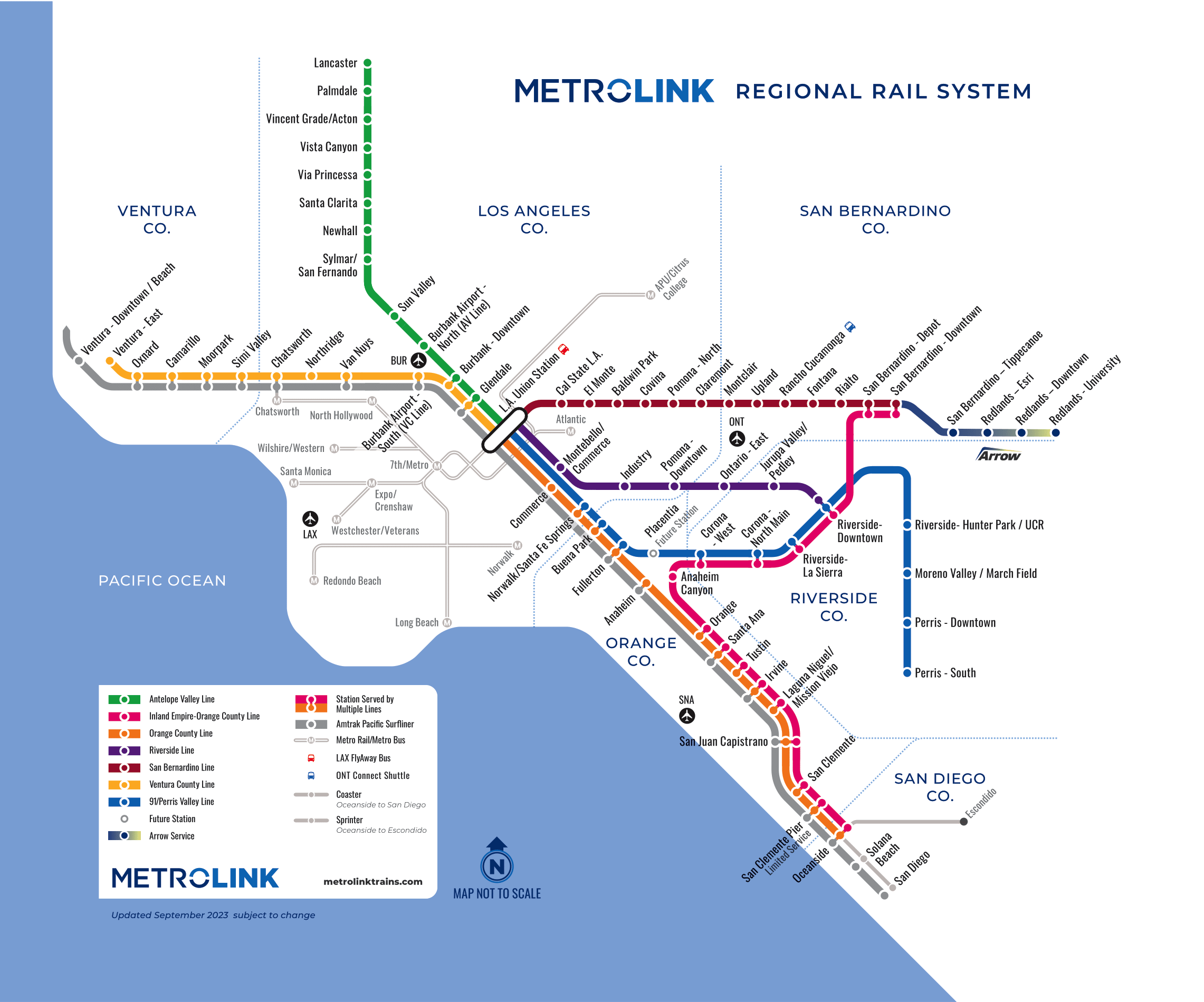
Key

Metrolink (reporting mark SCAX) is a commuter rail system in Southern California, serving Los Angeles, Orange, Riverside, San Bernardino, San Diego (Note: Metrolink only serves the city of Oceanside in San Diego County) and Ventura counties. The system consists of eight lines and 68 stations operating on 545.6 miles (878.1 km) of track. This includes Arrow, which Metrolink operates under a contract with the San Bernardino County Transportation Authority (SBCTA).

In 2025, the system had a ridership of 6,063,500, or about 20,700 per weekday as of the second quarter of 2026.

Metrolink connects with Los Angeles County's Metro Rail and Metro Busway systems, North County Transit District's Coaster commuter rail and Sprinter hybrid rail services, and with Amtrak's Pacific Surfliner, Coast Starlight, Southwest Chief, Sunset Limited, and Texas Eagle inter-city rail services. Metrolink owns several hundred miles of track and also operates over track shared with freight railroads and other public agencies.

The system, founded in 1991 as the Southern California Regional Rail Authority (SCRRA) and adopting "Metrolink" as its moniker, started operation in 1992. Average weekday ridership was 42,928 as of 2017. The SCRRA contracts with Alstom both to operate the trains and to maintain the rolling stock (locomotives and passenger cars).

== Routes ==
In addition to suburban communities and cities, Metrolink also serves several points of interest such as downtown Los Angeles, downtown San Bernardino, Burbank, Hollywood Burbank Airport, Cal State LA, Angel Stadium, and the San Clemente Pier. Special service has also been extended to the Pomona Fairplex, the Ventura County Fairgrounds, and Auto Club Speedway for certain events.

Weekend service is offered on all routes except the Riverside Line.

The system currently consists of eight lines:

Line	Termini		Routes used
Line	Western/Northern	Eastern/Southern	Routes used
Antelope Valley	Lancaster	Union Station	Runs southwest from Lancaster station, paralleling State Route 14. It then turns west, then southeast to then roughly follow Interstate 5 to Union Station.
Inland Empire–Orange County	San Bernardino–Downtown	Oceanside	Runs southwest from downtown San Bernardino to follow the Riverside Freeway (Interstate 215 south and State Route 91) west. It then parallels State Route 55 from Anaheim to Santa Ana, and then parallels Interstate 5 from Tustin to Oceanside.
Orange County	Union Station	Oceanside	Runs southeast from Union Station along Interstate 5. It deviates slightly from the interstate in southeast Los Angeles and north Orange counties.
Riverside	Union Station	Riverside–Downtown	Runs southeast from Union Station, before paralleling State Route 60 along the south Inland Empire, then goes southeast to downtown Riverside.
San Bernardino	Union Station	San Bernardino–Downtown	Runs east from Union Station, and in the Interstate 10 median starting near Cal State LA. It then continues east to downtown San Bernardino between Interstate 10 and State Route 210.
San Bernardino	Union Station	Redlands–Downtown (limited weekday service)	Runs east from Union Station, and in the Interstate 10 median starting near Cal State LA. It then continues east to downtown San Bernardino between Interstate 10 and State Route 210.
Ventura County	Ventura–East	Union Station	Runs east from Ventura, roughly following State Route 118. It then turns south at Hollywood Burbank Airport towards Union Station.
91/Perris Valley	Union Station	Perris–South	Runs southeast from Union Station along Interstate 5, east along the Riverside Freeway (State Route 91) to Riverside, and then south along Interstate 215.
Arrow	San Bernardino–Downtown	Redlands–University	Runs east from downtown San Bernardino to the University of Redlands in Redlands.

== Fares ==
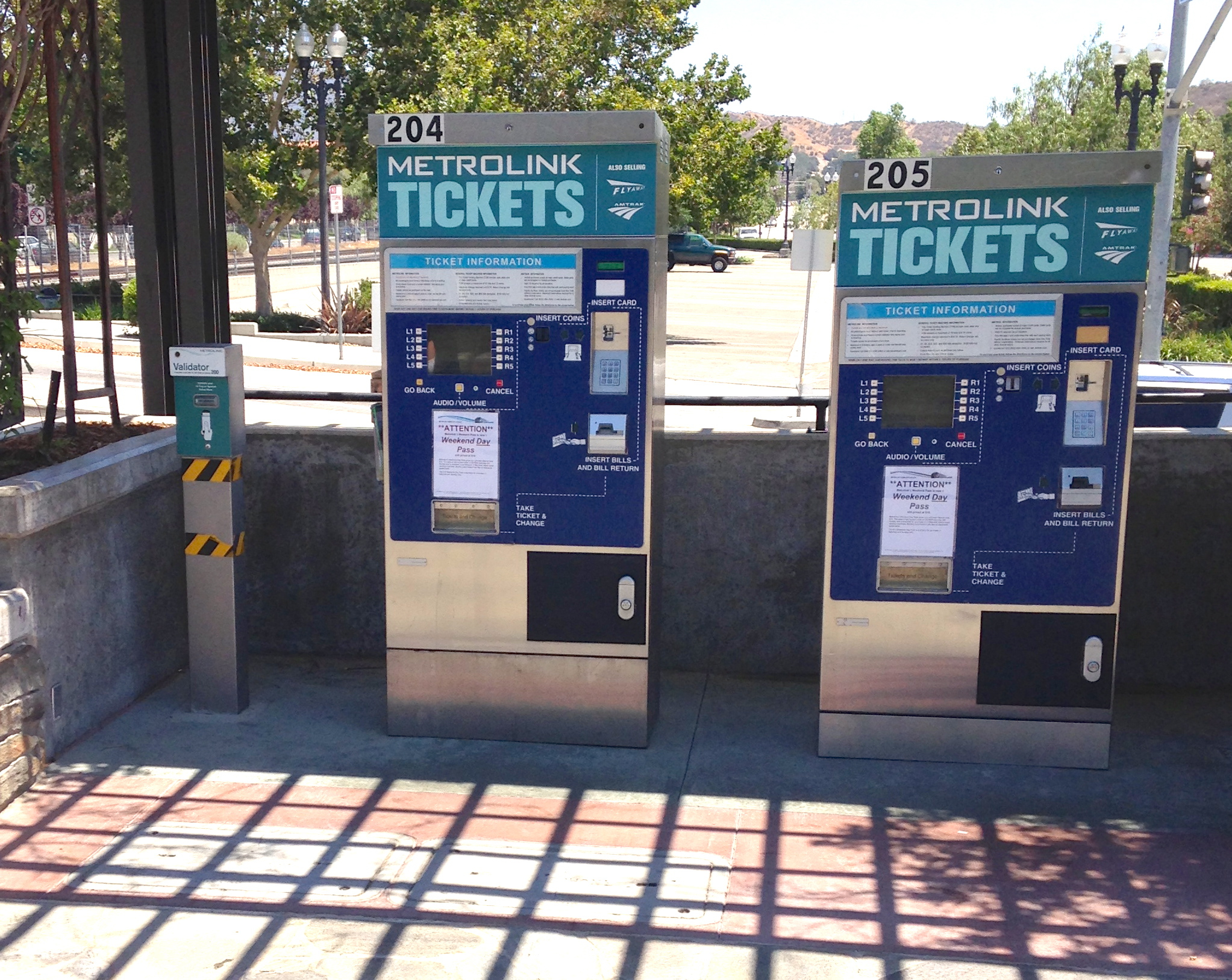
Metrolink ticket vending machines. Machines also sell tickets for Amtrak trains and the FlyAway (bus) bus service to Los Angeles International Airport.

Metrolink's fare structure is based on a flat fee for boarding the train and an additional distance cost with fares calculated in 25-cent increments of driving distance between stations.

Metrolink tickets are valid fare for most connecting buses and trains; certain Metrolink tickets are valid on certain Amtrak routes.

Fare increases had normally occur annually in July, to coincide with increased fuel and labor expenses, and have generally averaged between 3.5% and 5% per year (although restructuring caused a larger jump in rates). The oil price increases since 2003 are partly to blame for consistently increasing fares, as Metrolink trains are powered by diesel fuel. In 2025, Metrolink simplified its fares by eliminating certain pass categories and implemented a systemwide weekday pass and central Los Angeles pass in addition to a pre-existing systemwide weekend pass.

In late 2018, Metrolink announced that San Bernardino Line ticket prices would be reduced by 25% at least through 2019 in an attempt to increase ridership. Similar discounts have been introduced to other lines since 2016.

In 2023, Metrolink made fares free for students of all ages, although this grant-funded program expired and 50% discounts made available instead after July 1, 2025.

== History ==
=== Early organizing ===
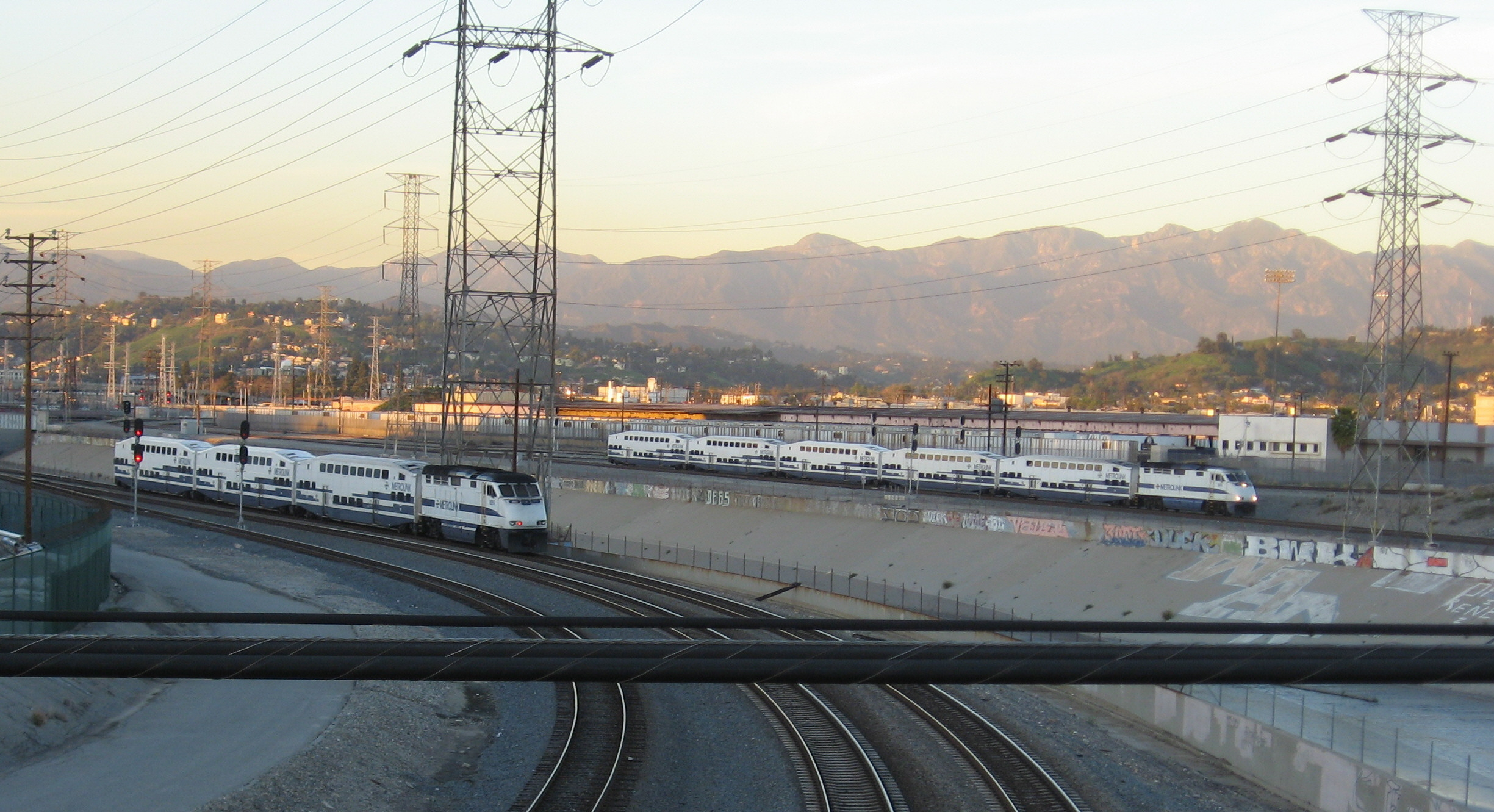
Metrolink trains approaching and leaving Union Station during the evening rush hour (2008)

Inter-city rail service around Los Angeles persisted through the formation of Amtrak in 1971, but rail operations suitable for commuters remained elusive throughout the 1980s. On October 18, 1982, CalTrain, LA's first commuter rail service, began on the existing Ventura County Line, but only lasted a few months before termination, on March 1, 1983.

The Orange County Transportation Commission initiated the Amtrak-operated Orange County Commuter in early 1990, running between Los Angeles and San Juan Capistrano, but a more comprehensive approach was deemed necessary. Senate Bill 1402 was signed into law on May 25, 1990, which directed local transportation authorities to establish a regional plan for commuter rail by the year's end.

In October 1990, the member agencies of the SCRRA had announced the purchase of 175 miles (282 km) of track, maintenance yards, and stations and other property from Southern Pacific for $450 million in 1990. (Note: $1.11 billion in 2025 adjusted for inflation) The rights to use Los Angeles Union Station were purchased from Union Pacific, the station's owner at the time, for $17 million in the same year (Note: $41.9 million in 2025 adjusted for inflation) (Union Station has since been purchased by Los Angeles Metro). Freight operations would continue on some corridors under coordination with passenger services. The joint powers authority was formally founded in 1991.

=== Initial service and expansion ===
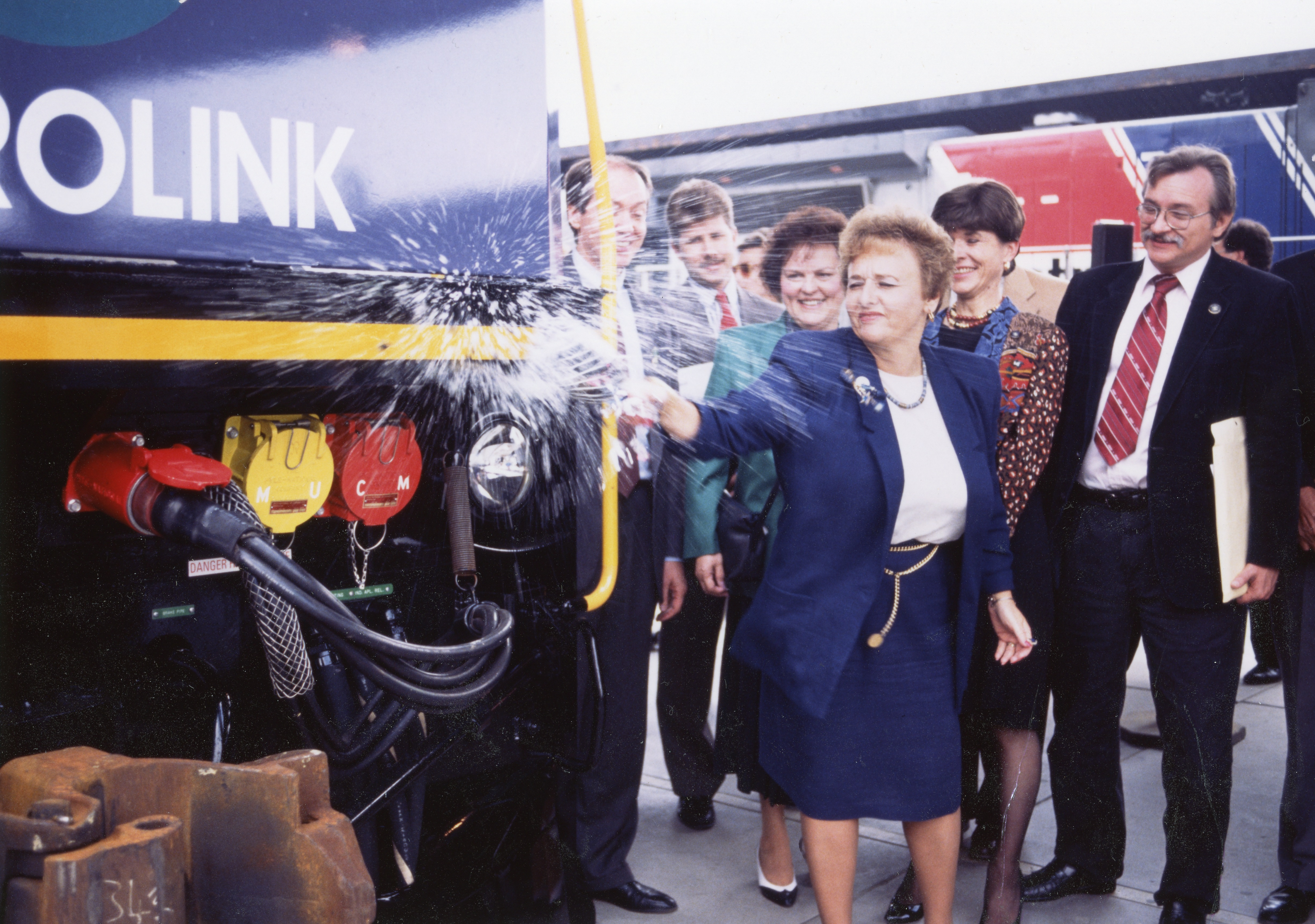
Metrolink grand opening celebration on October 26, 1992. Metrolink board chair Jacki Bacharach smashed a champagne on a train for the ceremonial launch.

Services commenced on October 26, 1992, under contracted operation by Amtrak with the Ventura, Santa Clarita (now the Antelope Valley), and San Bernardino Lines. In 1993, service was expanded to include the Riverside Line and the following year the Orange County Line was conveyed from Amtrak branding to Metrolink. The 1994 Northridge Earthquake saw the closure of Interstate 5 and other regional freeways, bringing widespread attention on Metrolink alternatives. Metrolink experimented with expanded service to Camarillo and Oxnard, and it extended the Antelope Valley line ten years ahead of schedule, rapidly adding six stations in six weeks. The Inland Empire-Orange County Line opened in 1995, and more trains on the Orange County service were funded. The 91 Line (now the 91/Perris Valley Line) opened in 2002.

From July 2004, Metrolink fares were changed from zone based to one based on distance. In 2005, a five-year operational contract was awarded to Connex Railroad/Veolia Transport. That same year, the Orange County Transportation Authority approved a plan to increase frequencies to 76 trains daily on the Orange County and Inland Empire-Orange County Lines by 2009, and funding for increased Metrolink service was included in the renewal of the Measure M sales tax for transportation approved by voters in November 2006. A proposed station in Yorba Linda was canceled after the city rejected it due to local opposition on March 16, 2004.

In July 2008, it was announced that ridership had risen 16% over the previous year. Following the 2008 Chatsworth train collision in which 25 people died and 135 were injured a number of safety measures were taken; in the fall of 2009, inward-facing video cameras were installed in locomotives in order to ensure that staff were complying with regulations, in particular a ban on use of mobile phones. In 2010, the first of 117 energy absorbing passenger carriages (which lessen the toll on passengers in the case of an accident) were received by the operator. Amtrak regained the contract to operate Metrolink beginning in July 2010. Average weekday ridership for the fourth quarter of 2009 was 38,400.

In 2010, to save money in the face of funding cuts, the Metrolink board voted to reduce mid-day service on the Inland Empire–Orange County Line, as well as weekend service on the Orange County, Riverside, and Inland Empire–Orange County lines.

Average weekday ridership was 41,000 during May 2011. A survey found that 90% of users during a typical weekday in 2009 would have previously driven alone or carpooled and that the system replaced an estimated 25,000 vehicle trips. During a weekend closure of Interstate 405 in July 2011, the system recorded its highest-ever weekend ridership of 20,000 boardings which was 50% higher than the same weekend in 2010 and 10% higher than the previous weekend ridership record which occurred during U2 360° Tour in June 2011. Ridership continued to rise in 2012 (up 2%), when average weekday ridership reached 42,265. Although 2013 annual boardings were almost 12.07 million, ridership dropped to 11.74 million by fall 2014 which was contrary to projections. Blaming the decrease on the worst recession since World War II, Metrolink said it found itself caught between cutting service and boosting fares, both of which would likely further decrease ridership.

Metrolink began offering mobile ticketing in early 2016.

The Riverside County Transportation Commission (RCTC) extended the 91 Line (which was renamed the 91/Perris Valley Line) southeast 24 miles (39 km) to Perris, using the existing San Jacinto Branch Line, which it purchased in 1993. Initial plans were for construction/renovation of the line to begin in 2012, but these were delayed by a lawsuit filed by homeowners in the affected area, who challenged the RCTC's environmental report. The lawsuit was settled in late July 2013. Construction on the $248.3 million (Note: $343 million in 2025 adjusted for inflation) extension began in October 2013; service was originally planned to begin in December 2015, and then in February 2016. In mid-February 2016, the extension's opening was planned in March of that year. The extension officially opened in June 2016.

When COVID-19 impacted Los Angeles and its communities in March 2020, Metrolink ridership fell by 90%. Metrolink increased cleaning measures, added COVID safety protocols, and reduced service. On March 26, 2020, the agency ran on a temporarily reduced schedule, removing most trains.

On April 4, 2022, Metrolink restored its 24 trains and added 2 new trains to the schedule. Metrolink and Amtrak also entered into a code-sharing agreement on the Ventura County Line, with Pacific Surfliner trains A761, A770, A777, and A784 accepting valid Metrolink tickets between stations served by the Ventura County Line and Ventura station. Metrolink also announced that Metrolink service to Ventura station on the Ventura County Line is planned. Alstom began as the operator for Metrolink on July 1, 2025 for a five year contract period with an extension option for a further three year period. The operating contract also includes the Arrowline service in San Bernardino county.

=== Arrow expansion ===
Arrow, formerly the Redlands Passenger Rail Project, opened on October 24, 2022. The 9-mile (14 km) eastward rail extension from San Bernardino to Redlands was planned by the San Bernardino Associated Governments (SANBAG). The association considered whether to extend commuter rail along the corridor or to install either bus rapid transit or light rail lines, but in December 2015, SANBAG officials said they planned to extend Metrolink service only to the San Bernardino Transit Center and use diesel multiple units operated by Omnitrans in lieu of Metrolink locomotive-hauled coaches on the rest of the route. In late 2019, Metrolink assumed the operating rights and carried out construction after Omnitrans was dismissed due to restructuring of that organization. Groundbreaking for Arrow's construction took place on July 19, 2019. Arrow began operation on October 24, 2022.

=== Rolling stock reliability issues ===
In October 2024, Metrolink increased its overall service by 23%, focusing on mid-day and week-end service, and optimizing connections between trains from its different lines.

However, in March 2026, Metrolink announced a 20% reduction of its schedule, due to the poor reliability and high maintenance costs of its EMD F125 locomotives. A price increase and additional service cuts are envisioned for October 2026, due to a highly constrained budget.

== Notable incidents ==
From 1993 to 2008, 218 people were killed in Metrolink train incidents, the majority of these being pedestrians killed on the tracks, while 39 were due to three train collisions.

=== Glendale, 1994 ===
There is a narrow residential strip of the city of Glendale which is isolated from the rest of the city by the presence of high-speed rail lines. Access is limited to grade crossings spaced at very long intervals. The sections of track between the grade crossings were not fenced for many years, and dozens of pedestrians and vehicles were struck. Two of the accidents resulted in a total of seven deaths in one month:

On August 15, 1994, three pedestrians died when they were attempting to cross the tracks along a section of Metrolink track adjacent to San Fernando Blvd in Glendale in the middle of a mile-long stretch of track that had no pedestrian crossings and no fences to discourage pedestrian access. Later that August, four persons in an automobile died when they were attempting to cross at a grade crossing of the Metrolink track adjacent to San Fernando Blvd.

=== Placentia, 2002 ===
Two people died and 22 were seriously injured on April 23, 2002, when a BNSF freight train collided head-on with a Metrolink train in Placentia, near the Atwood Junction, at the intersection of Orangethorpe Avenue and Richfield Road. Both trains were on the same east–west track moving toward one another. The Metrolink had the right-of-way; it was supposed to switch to a southbound track. The BNSF train was supposed to slow and stop just before the switch while the Metrolink passed, but the crew missed a signal 1.5 miles (2.4 km) back warning them to slow down. By the time the crew saw the red "stop" signal at the switch and the Metrolink train, they were going too fast to avoid a collision. Although there was speculation that the signals alerting the BNSF to slow and stop had malfunctioned, an investigation later concluded that it was human error by the crew that caused the accident.

=== Glendale, 2005 ===
Eleven people were killed (including an off-duty sheriff's deputy and a train conductor) and over 100 people were injured, about 40 seriously on January 26, 2005, when a Metrolink passenger train collided with a vehicle parked on the tracks, which then jackknifed and struck a stationary freight locomotive and a Metrolink train moving in the opposite direction. The man who parked the vehicle on the tracks, Juan Manuel Alvarez, was apprehended and charged with 11 counts of first-degree murder with special circumstances, including murder by train wrecking. On June 26, 2008, Alvarez was convicted on the 11 murder counts and sentenced to life imprisonment without the possibility of parole.

=== Chatsworth, 2008 ===
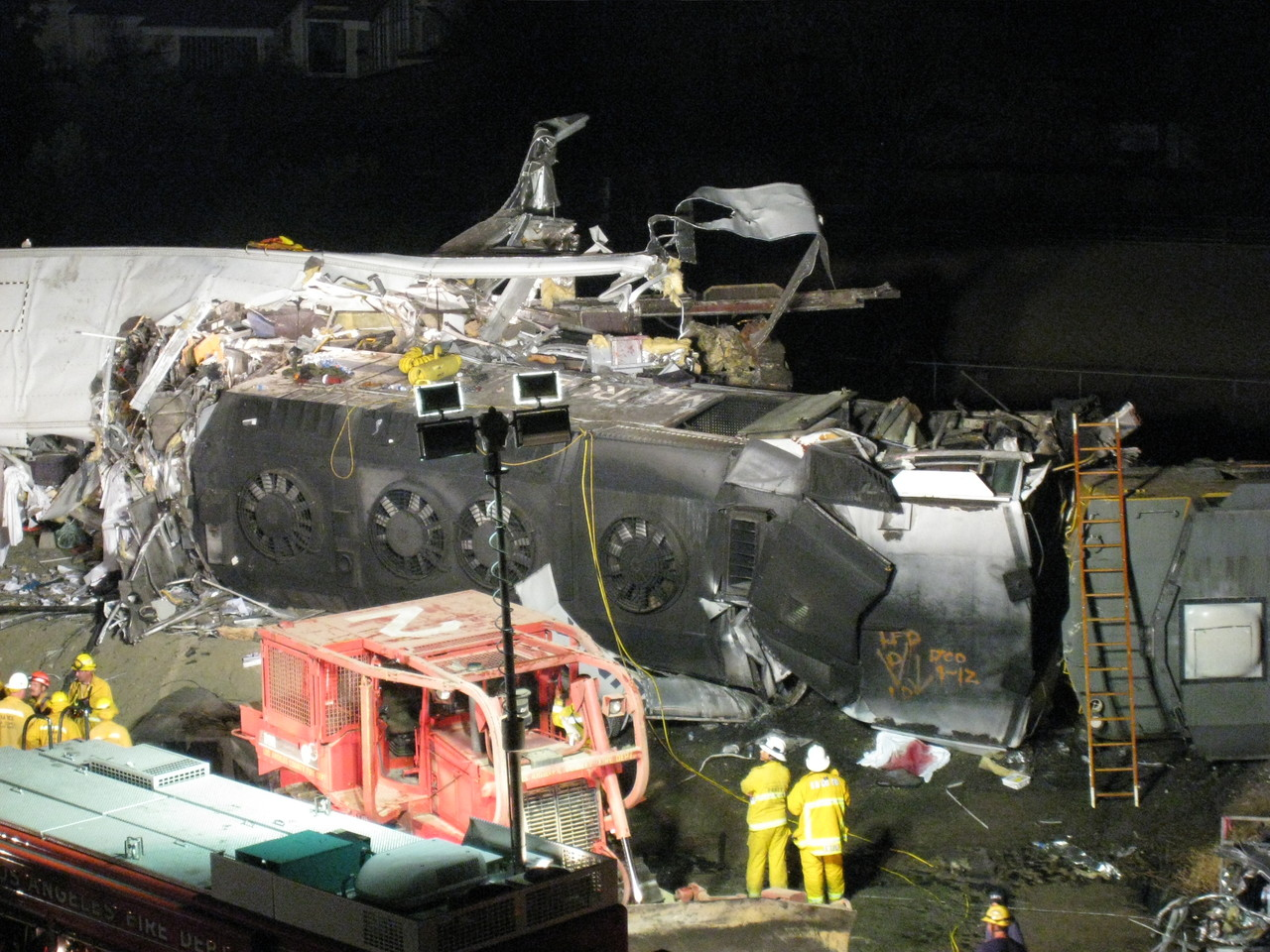
2008 Chatsworth crash aftermath

Twenty-five people were killed and 135 injured when a Metrolink commuter train carrying 222 persons collided head on with a Union Pacific freight train, toppling one of the passenger cars and the locomotive onto its side in the Chatsworth district of Los Angeles. Of the 135 people who were injured, 81 were transported to local hospitals in serious or critical condition. The velocity of the trains caused the Metrolink locomotive to telescope into the first passenger car.

=== Oxnard, 2015 ===
Thirty people were injured when southbound Metrolink Ventura County Line train 102 (East Ventura to LA Union Station) crashed into a truck that was stopped on the tracks at the Rice Avenue crossing near Oxnard at about 5:40 am on February 24, 2015. One person, the train's engineer, later died of his injuries. The driver, who had left the truck before the crash, was located by the police and taken into custody. The train consisted of a Hyundai-Rotem "guardian fleet" cab car in the lead, a Bombardier Bi-level "bike car" coach, two Hyundai-Rotem "guardian fleet" coach cars and an EMD F59PH locomotive. After this accident, Metrolink leased 40 diesel freight locomotives from BNSF, to be placed into service as temporary cab cars while they investigated problems with their Hyundai-Rotem cars. On July 8, 2016, the Metrolink board approved a $1.5 million (Note: $2.01 million in 2025 adjusted for inflation) plan to repair the plows on the Hyundai Rotem cab cars. Once the repairs were completed, the cars returned to service and the leased BNSF locomotives were returned.

== Planned expansions ==
Metrolink has grown in popularity, and there are a number of planned extensions of the system and new stations. Station parking capacity has also been strained.

=== Train frequency increases and SCORE ===
On April 26, 2018, Metrolink was awarded $1.175 billion from the California State Transportation Agency in order to dramatically increase train service along its existing lines and for the expansion of the Metrolink station in time for the 2028 Summer Olympics. These funds will be used to heavily increase frequency on Metrolink's lines, with half-hourly frequencies planned on most routes.

=== High speed rail interface ===
During the initial years of operation of the California High-Speed Rail between Merced and Burbank, projected to commence in 2022 (but since repeatedly delayed to 2033), passengers would use Metrolink for travel between Burbank and Los Angeles. An alternative plan would have track-sharing to Union Station but this would require electrification for that portion of the line. Such an electrification would be similar to the Caltrain Modernization Program, which also involves electrifying a rail line for eventual use by commuter and high-speed trains. This alternate plan would provide a "one-seat ride" at the start of service between the Central Valley and downtown, or even Orange County (via Anaheim).

=== Burbank Junction speed improvement project ===
On November 9, 2022, Metrolink broke ground on the Burbank Junction speed improvement project. The project will realign and replace the mainline track and siding between Burbank Boulevard and Magnolia Boulevard. The project will shorten trip lengths on the Antelope Valley Line trains, Ventura County Line trains, Pacific Surfliner trains, and Coast Starlight trains by one and a half minutes and will permit trains to operate with 30-minute headways in both directions, massively improving service frequencies along the corridors. The location of the tracks will be slightly realigned in order to accommodate a new pedestrian overcrossing. The project was delayed by almost one year, with the project initially scheduled to break ground in the winter of 2021 and was expected to be completed in the winter of 2022. The construction completion date was expected to be in 2023, but as of December 2025, Metrolink instead is communicating that the project will be done by summer 2028.

=== 91/Perris Valley Line ===
==== Commerce station relocation ====
Los Angeles Metro plans to relocate Commerce station along the Orange County Line to the city of Pico Rivera. The new station will be a full-time stop along both the Orange County Line and the 91/Perris Valley Line. The California High-Speed Rail Authority initially proposed slightly relocating the station to a new location at Maple Avenue, north of Telegraph Road, due to severe physical, operational, and safety conflicts along the LOSSAN Corridor right of way, which it plans to utilize between its Burbank Airport station and the Anaheim Regional Transportation Intermodal Center. However, on February 23, 2023, LA Metro's board of directors unanimously approved a motion to instead conduct a feasibility study into relocating the station somewhere in Pico Rivera. On March 26, 2026, the LA Metro board of directors unanimously approved a motion accepting the results of the feasibility study and to direct staff towards advancing the station into 30% preliminary engineering, site layout design, and CEQA/NEPA environmental review. On October 22, 2026, the LA Metro board of directors unanimously approved a motion allocating up to $6 million in capital seed funding to advance the goals in the previous motion.

==== Placentia infill station ====
A new Metrolink station in Placentia, which will serve the 91/Perris Valley Line's north Orange County passengers, has completed its final design phase, save for issues related to the parking needed to accompany the station. Construction on the $24 million Placentia station began in 2018, and was scheduled to open in 2024, but now is on hold pending further negotiations with BNSF.

==== Mead Valley infill station ====
In 2024, the Riverside County Transportation Commission (RCTC) announced the construction of a infill station located in Mead Valley. Construction is expected to begin in late 2025 and open in 2029.

==== Expansion to Temecula and Hemet ====
In 2008, lobbyists pushed for a rail line to Temecula in southwestern Riverside County via the 91 Line's (now the 91/Perris Valley Line) Riverside–La Sierra station. While this proposed line could follow the route of an abandoned freight line, it would require significant funding, as freight service ceased almost 30 years ago. Despite this, the Riverside County Transportation Commission's 2008 Commuter Rail Feasibility Study still lists this route as one possibility being considered. Expansion to Hemet has also been discussed, with two stations planned.

==== Perris Valley Line Extension to Winchester ====
In 2024, the Riverside County Transportation Committee's Traffic Relief Plan called to extend the Perris Valley line to Downtown Winchester

=== Expansion to the Palm Springs Area ===
The cities of the Palm Springs Area (Palm Springs, Cathedral City, Palm Desert, Indio, and Coachella) have requested commuter rail service from Los Angeles and Orange County, but the Union Pacific Railroad opposes further passenger service on its tracks. Nonetheless, in 1999, the Coachella Valley Association of Governments was investigating the possibility of two daily round trips via the 91/Perris Valley line from Los Angeles's Union Station through Fullerton and Riverside to stations in Palm Springs and Indio (with a possible stop near Palm Desert), possibly through a partnership with Amtrak. This extension would likewise require significant money for infrastructure improvements: at least $500 million, according to the California State Rail Plan of 2005. Nonetheless, in 2013 Caltrans conducted a feasibility study of a Coachella Valley service and RCTC has resolved to pursue establishing one. By 2020, plans for the Coachella Valley Rail (CV Rail) project had evolved to an Amtrak-operated service.

=== Extension to Kern County ===
Expansion to Kern County has been discussed in a 2012 Kern County Council of Governments report. The expansion proposed is to extend the Antelope Valley line from Lancaster to Rosamond, along the Rosamond Corridor to service Edwards Air Force Base.

=== Service between the cities Ventura and Santa Clarita ===
The Santa Paula Branch Line was acquired by the Ventura County Transportation Commission in 1995. The railway, a former portion of the Southern Pacific Coast Line, connects the city of Ventura to Santa Clarita paralleling California State Route 126. Sierra Northern Railway operates the services on the line. Plans exist to rehabilitate tracks for Metrolink service. A study from 1991 estimated a cost between $70 million to $90 million to rebuild the line.

=== Service to Santa Barbara County ===
The Santa Barbara County Association of Governments (SBCAG) had announced plans for Metrolink service to/from Los Angeles Union Station to begin in Winter, 2026, starting with one daily trip in each direction, however the plans were scrapped in favor of an additional Pacific Surfliner train.

=== Orange County maintenance facility ===
As of December 1, 2022, the Orange County Transportation Authority (OCTA) has laid a third track south of the Interstate 5 overpass in Irvine leading into the future site of the Orange County maintenance facility. The facility will serve as an additional site to service Metrolink and Amtrak trains on a parcel of land owned by the Orange County Transportation Authority just north of Irvine station. The project will receive funding from California's SCORE Transit Intercity Rail Capital Program. The project also includes an extension to Ridge Valley, a road north of the parcel where the project will occur.

=== Orange County Line realignment ===
OCTA officials are interested in moving the LOSSAN corridor (Los Angeles-San Diego), which carries the Orange County Line and the Pacific Surfliner, from its current alignment inland to avoid service disruptions due to coastal erosion along the route.

=== San Bernardino Line ===
==== Zero Emissions Multiple Unit ====
Beginning in 2024, Arrow will use at least one hydrail unit, called a Zero Emissions Multiple Unit (ZEMU). Furthermore, the San Bernardino County Transportation Authority (SBCTA) has expressed interest to expand usage of the ZEMU from Arrow to the San Bernardino Line, which would result in them operating all the way to Los Angeles Union Station.

==== LA General Medical Center infill station ====
Los Angeles Metro plans to add the current LA General Medical Center station on the El Monte Busway as an infill station to the San Bernardino Line. This would involve building a second track and center platform. The cost of this project is estimated between $51 million and $110 million. Currently, westbound Metrolink passengers must exit at the Cal State LA station and take any of the westbound buses one stop to the Medical Center.

==== Pomona-North to Rancho Cucamonga Metrolink Shuttle Service ====
SBCTA is planning to increase frequency from Pomona North to the Rancho Cucamonga Metrolink station to 15 minute frequency using ZEMU. it is expected to cost 150 million.

== Governance ==
The SCRRA is a joint powers authority governed by five county-level agencies that fund the Metrolink service: Los Angeles Metro, the Orange County Transportation Authority, the Riverside County Transportation Commission, the San Bernardino County Transportation Authority, and the Ventura County Transportation Commission.

Each agency appoints members to the Metrolink board of directors. Los Angeles gets four seats on the board, Orange, Riverside and San Bernardino counties each get two seats, and Ventura County gets one seat. There are also three non-voting, ex-officio members from the Southern California Association of Governments, the San Diego Association of Governments, and the state of California.

Metrolink is headquartered at the Wilshire Grand Center alongside the Southern California Association of Governments. Metrolink had previously operated out of the Metro Headquarters Building from 2011 until 2018, when Metro needed more space in their building. Before 2011, Metrolink's headquarters were in the MCI Center, where they occupied around 40,000 square feet (3,700 m^{2}) of space.

Law enforcement is handled by the Los Angeles County Sheriff Department's Transit Services Bureau in all lines, except the San Bernardino Line and Arrow line within San Bernardino county. Within San Bernardino County San Bernardino County Sheriff Department handles Law enforcement.

== Facilities ==
Metrolink operates several maintenance facilities across its service area. Its Keller Yard Central Maintenance Facility (CMF) is located on the east bank of the Los Angeles River near the intersection of Interstate 5 and Route 110, just south of the location of the former Southern Pacific Taylor Yard. The facility is operated by Metrolink's equipment maintenance contractor: Bombardier Transportation. The Eastern Maintenance Facility (EMF) is located in San Bernardino. Metrolink trains are also serviced at Coaster's Stuart Mesa Facility, which is located between San Clemente Pier and Oceanside at the southwest end of Camp Pendleton. This yard is owned by the North County Transit District. Arrow trains are stored and maintained at the Arrow Maintenance Facility (AMF), located east of the San Bernardino Depot and west of Interstate 215.

Metrolink's operations center is located in Pomona, near Pomona–North station.

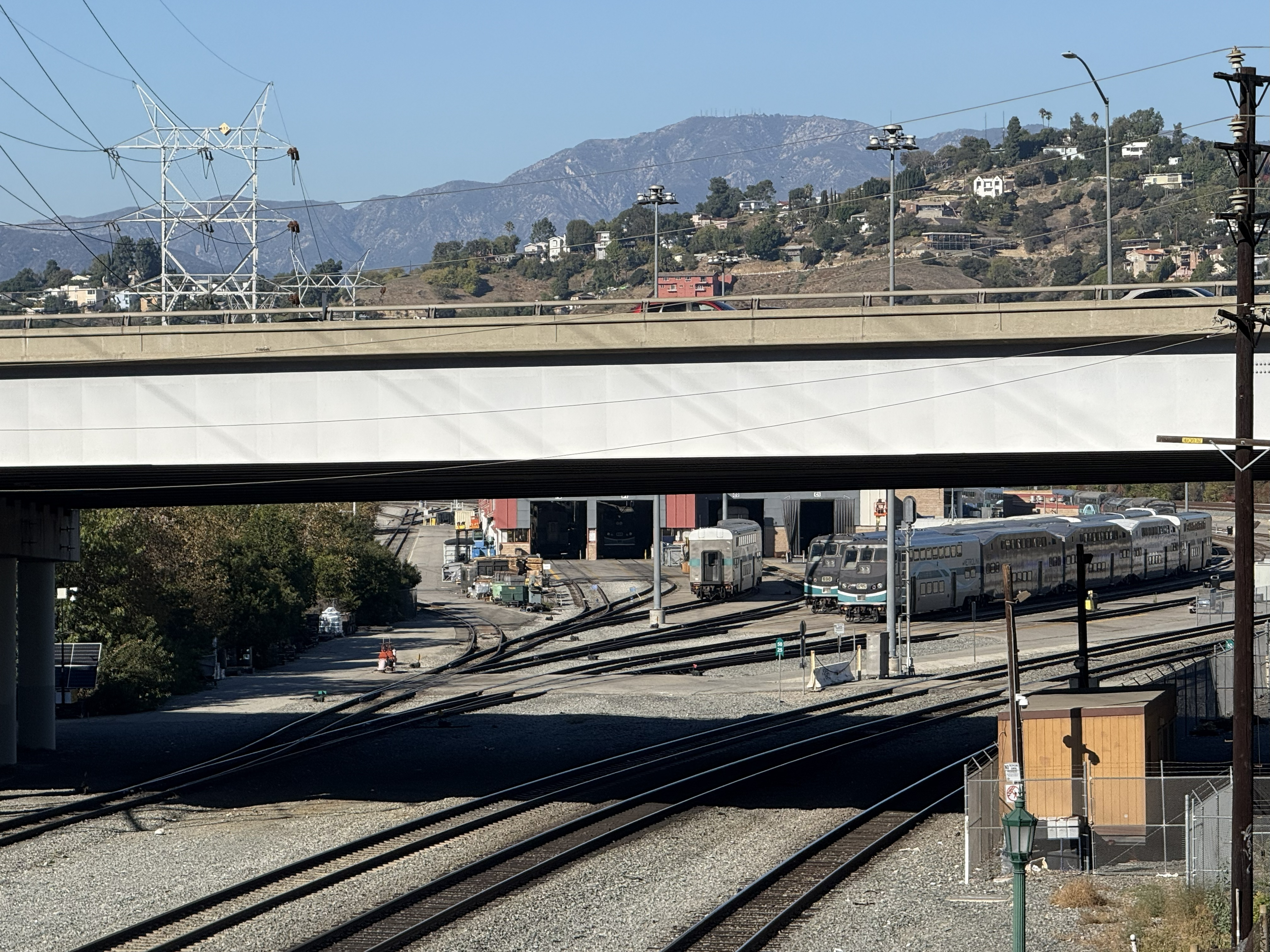
Central Maintenance Facility behind Interstate 5

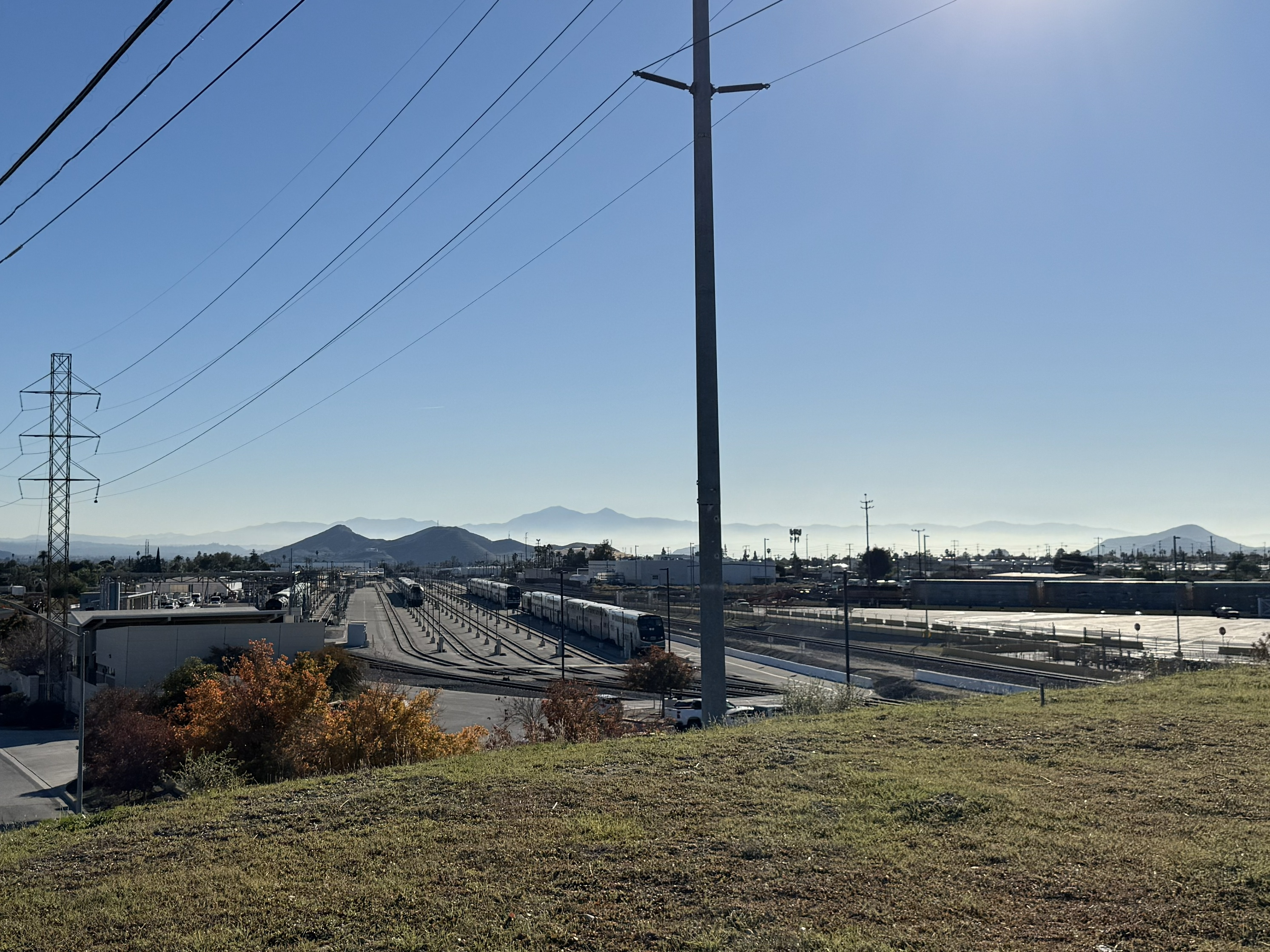
Eastern Maintenance Facility

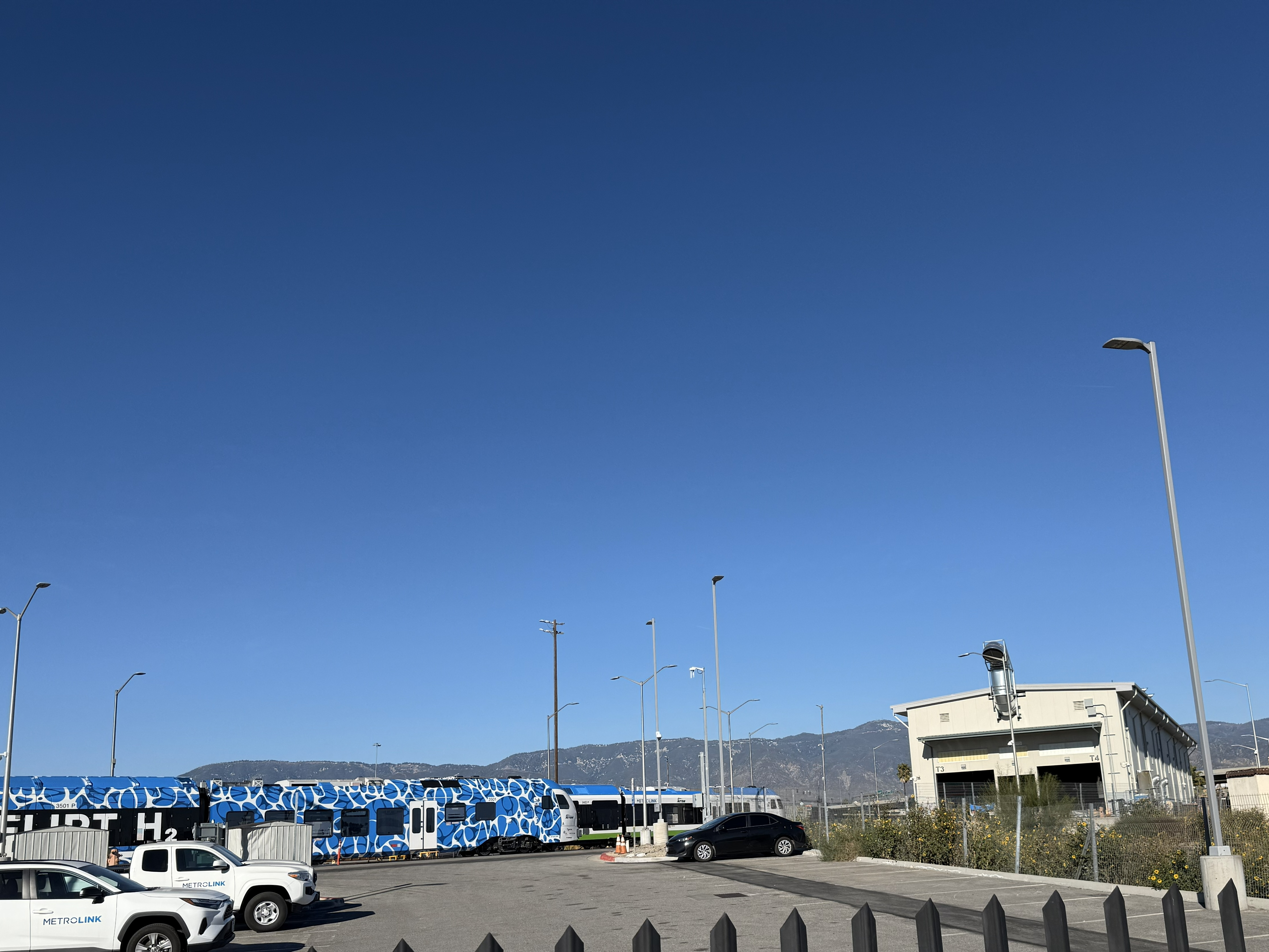
Arrow Maintenance Facility

== Rolling stock ==
The core Metrolink fleet consists of 60 locomotives, 121 Bombardier BiLevel Coaches (called the "Sentinel Fleet" by Metrolink), and 137 Rotem Commuter Cars (called the "Guardian Fleet").

Since Arrow's opening in October 2022, its fleet consists of three Stadler FLIRT self-propelled trainsets.

=== Livery ===
Until recently, most Metrolink-owned units were painted in a white livery with blue stripes that was introduced in the late 1990s as a replacement for a similar scheme that had been in use since the agency's launch. Beginning in 2007, the agency began the process of switching to a new blue and green "ribbons" design; the Guardian Fleet and EMD F125 locomotives already arrive from the factory in the new colors. With the introduction of the 2022 rebranding in celebration of the agency's thirtieth anniversary that included a new two-toned blue logo, newly-refurbished rolling stock is currently in delivery wearing these colors starting in 2024.

== See also ==
- Transportation in the Inland Empire
- Transportation in San Diego County
- Transportation in Los Angeles
- Transportation in California
