= San Bernardino County Transportation Authority =

Planning and operating agency in California

Overview
- Headquarters: San Bernardino Santa Fe Depot; San Bernardino, California
- Website: gosbcta.com

Operation
- Began operation: 1973; 53 years ago as San Bernardino Associated Governments

The San Bernardino County Transportation Authority (SBCTA) is one of the successors to San Bernardino Associated Governments (SANBAG). They are responsible for administering the Measure I half-cent tax which voters in San Bernardino County, California, passed most recently in 2004. The SBCTA conducts transportation planning, construction, and operation in San Bernardino County. The SBCTA is a joint powers authority comprising the entire county and its cities. Every city and county supervisor is provided one seat on the board, and it also includes a nonvoting member from the California Department of Transportation's (Caltrans) District 8.

== History ==
In 2016, Senate bill 1305, consolidated five different transit agencies into SBCTA. Those agencies were County Transportation Commission, County Transportation Authority, Service Authority for Freeway Emergencies, Congestion Management Agency, and Subregional Planning Agency.

In 2019, SBCTA mulled direct takeover of Omnitrans due to its $520 million deficit. In response to pressure of county supervisors, SBCTA initiated a study of consolidation of Omnitrans called SBCTA County-wide Transit Efficiency Study. By the end of 2020, SBCTA balked at the idea of consolidating Omnitrans under SBCTA due to pension obligations.

== Funding ==
SBCTA operates with a budget of 1.160 billion dollars as of the 2023 fiscal year

== SB Express Lanes ==
=== I-10 Express Lanes ===
The SBCTA and Caltrans completed the $929.2 million Phase 1 project that added Express Lanes, also known as High Occupancy Toll (HOT) Lanes to Interstate 10 (I-10) from the Los Angeles County line to Interstate 15 (I-15). Under Phase 1, 18 bridges throughout the corridor were either replaced or widened to accommodate the new Express Lanes. Completed in August 2024 and opened as SB Express Lanes

In 2018, SBCTA choose Transportation Corridor Agencies to be account and payment processing partner for SB Express Lanes

Phase two is planned from I-15 in the west to Pepper Avenue in the east, an addition of 11 miles. The project is currently in final design and right of way phase.

There are longer-term plans to have a 64-mile (103 km) continuous HOT lanes network between Alameda Street in Downtown Los Angeles and Ford Street in Redlands. This expansion is planned in four phases. As of 2024, the proposed segment in Los Angeles County to convert the new HOV lanes to HOT lanes and bridge the gap between I-605 and Monte Vista Avenue is under environmental review, the section from Etiwanda Avenue to Pepper Avenue in Colton is planned to break ground in 2025, and the segment from Pepper Avenue to Ford Street in Redlands is still in the planning stage.

=== I-15 Express Lanes ===
The SBCTA has planned to implement tolled express lanes to I-15 from the Riverside County line to Duncan Canyon Road. Construction is expected to begin in 2023. The project is expected to cost $469.65 million. Phase one is under construction from from Cantu-Galleano Ranch Road in Jurupa Valley to just north of Foothill Boulevard in Rancho Cucamonga. Estimated cost is $535.00 Million.

== Planning ==
The SBCTA conducts transportation planning for San Bernardino County, California, as well as aligning with plans from neighboring agencies.

=== Road projects ===
==== North First Avenue Bridge ====
Due to automobile damage sustained to the North First Avenue Bridge in Barstow, the SBCTA took over the replacement of the bridge from the city due to its critical importance, since it passes over the BNSF Southern Transcon rail corridor and yard. The expected cost of the project is $62 million. Currently, it is in the design phase to replace the 1930s bridge.

=== Transit projects ===
==== Foothill Gold Line Extension ====
SBCTA is funding the Gold Line extension from Claremont to Downtown Montclair. However the extension is being delayed because of cost overruns. a 0.65 miles segment costs $171 million. The original cost to cross county line into Montclair was 80 million. SBCTA pushed the Foothill Gold Line Construction Authority to use Construction Manager at Risk method for construction to reduce costs.

==== West Valley Connector (BRT) ====
The West Valley Connector, also known as the sbX Purple Line, is a 35-mile-long (56 km) bus rapid transit project spearheaded by the SBCTA that will connect Pomona with Fontana. The first phase is a 19-mile-long (31 km) segment that will run along Holt Boulevard to Ontario International Airport and Metrolink’s Rancho Cucamonga station. Phase 1 will have 21 stations along the route.

==== Ontario Connector Project ====
As a cost-effective solution compared to the proposed extension of the Foothill Extension project from the Montclair Transit Center to Ontario International Airport, estimated at around $1–1.5 billion, the SBCTA and the airport were in the process of trying to implement a tunnel with autonomous, zero-emission vehicles on an on-demand basis from the Metrolink San Bernardino Line's Rancho Cucamonga station to Ontario International Airport.

Initially, The Boring Company proposed constructing a single 2.8-mile (4.5 km) tunnel similar to the Las Vegas Convention Center Loop that would cost $60 million. The company eventually dropped out of the project because they refused to submit another refined proposal.

The SBCTA moved forward with plans on the project. The new plans for the project included two 4.2-mile (6.8 km) tunnels that would cost roughly $492 million. The SBCTA selected HNTB as their new contractor to design, build, and maintain the project.

As of October 2024, the proposed route followed a reversed L-shaped alignment consisting of the Rancho Cucamonga Metrolink station, Milliken Avenue, and East Airport Drive towards Ontario International Airport.

However, the project was canceled by the SBCTA board of directors at its December 3, 2025 board meeting due to escalating costs.

==== Metrolink San Bernardino Line Double Track Project (Lilac to Rancho) ====
The SBCTA is in the process of double-tracking Metrolink's San Bernardino Line from CP Lilac to Rialto station to increase capacity and frequency within San Bernardino County.

=== Metrolink Enhanced Frequency Rail Service ===
SBCTA is planning to increase rail service using ZEMU from Pomona-North to Rancho Cucamonga Metrolink stations to 15 minute frequency in order to replace the Ontario Loop project

== Transit services ==
=== Bus ===
The SBCTA provides transit funding for all the bus transit agencies in San Bernardino County. It is also responsible for the oversight of Omnitrans, Victor Valley Transit Authority (VVTA), Needles Area Transit (NAT), Mountain Transit, and Basin Transit.

==== Fare Subsidy ====
In 2023, SBCTA expanded its Free Fares for School K-12 program to all transit agencies in order to boost transit use with San Bernardino County Youth.

=== Passenger rail ===
==== Metrolink ====
San Bernardino County is served by and partially funds three of Metrolink's lines. This includes the San Bernardino Line, which has the highest ridership of the entire system, the Inland Empire–Orange County Line, which terminates at the San Bernardino Santa Fe Depot and San Bernardino–Downtown stations, and the Riverside Line, which serves Ontario–East station.

===== Arrow =====
Logo of Arrow

Arrow, formerly the Redlands Passenger Rail Project (RPRP or RPR), is a commuter rail line which runs from the San Bernardino Transit Center in Downtown San Bernardino in the west to the University of Redlands in Redlands in the east. Simulated service testing commenced on September 12, 2022. Service commenced on October 24, 2022.

In 2019, SBCTA ordered Zero emissions multiple unit from Stadler for the Arrow line. The trainset is expected to be in operation by 2024.

===== Brightline West =====
SBCTA entered into a Local Rail Service Agreement with Brightline West to provide commuter rail services to victor valley residents. SBCTA also approved the sale of a five-acre portion of the jointly owned property at Cucamonga Station to Brightline West.

=== Van Pool ===
SBCTA administers the County's van pool Commuter service called SB Loop. Currently the system consists of 72 vehicles, averaging 37,000 trips per quarter. SBCTA also subsidizes Victor Valley Transit Authority's van pool. Averaging 119,400 trips per quarter in 189 vehicles

== Freeway Service Patrol ==
In order to reduce congestion, the SBCTA implemented the Freeway Service Patrol (FSP), whose purpose is to tow stranded motorists within the urbanized area of San Bernardino County. Service operates during peak traffic times.

== Active transportation ==
The SBCTA maintains a countywide active transportation plan. Although San Bernardino County is vast, much of the population is concentrated in the San Bernardino Valley portion in the county's southwest corner. The SBCTA requires complete streets within San Bernardino County when cities apply for roadway expansion grants.

=== Pacific Electric Trail ===
The Pacific Electric Trail is a 21-mile (34-kilometer) rail trail that has been constructed along the former San Bernardino Line. The Baldwin Park Subdivision within San Bernardino county is owned by SBCTA. SBCTA currently licenses the railroad right of way as a class one bike trail to the cities within the rail corridor. The city of Rialto has expressed in expanding the bike trail to SBCTA, once Union Pacific abandons the rail service in the eastern 2.5 miles of the subdivision.

=== Redlands loop/Orange Blossom Trail ===
SBCTA is using the right of way Redlands Subdivision to extend the bike trail from the University of Redlands Arrow station to highland under Highland/Redlands Regional Gap Connector Project. to provide an alternative mode of transportation.
