= San Bernardino Santa Fe Depot =

Railway station in San Bernardino, California

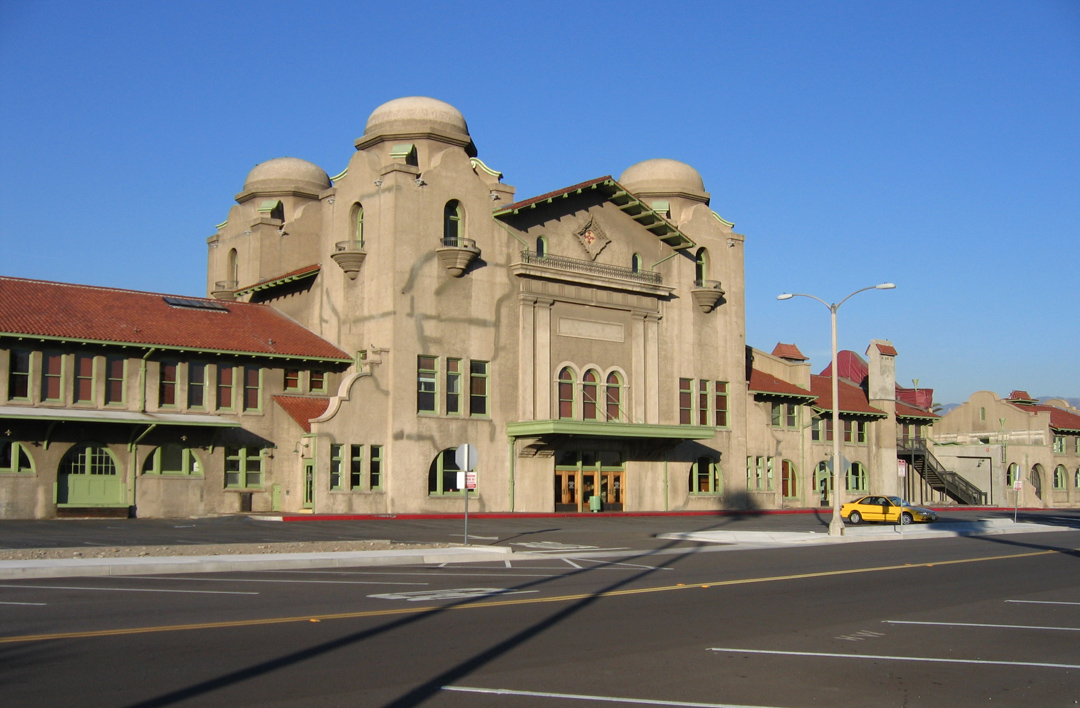
- Streetside of San Bernardino Santa Fe Depot in 2006

General information
- Other names: San Bernardino–Depot
- Location: 1170 West Third Street; San Bernardino, California; United States
- Coordinates: 34°06′15″N 117°18′35″W
- Owner: San Bernardino County Transportation Authority
- Line: BNSF Cajon / San Bernardino Subdivisions
- Platforms: 1 side platform (Amtrak); 3 island platforms (Metrolink)
- Tracks: 7
- Connections: Amtrak Thruway: 19; Greyhound; Mountain Transit: 5, 6; Victor Valley Transit Authority: 15; Omnitrans: 1

Construction
- Parking: 777 spaces, 10 accessible spaces
- Accessible: Yes

Other information
- Station code: Amtrak: SNB

History
- Opened: July 15, 1918; 108 years ago
- Rebuilt: 2004

Passengers
- FY 2025: 9,576 annually (Amtrak)
- FY 2026: 367 weekday boardings (Metrolink)

Services
Preceding station	Amtrak	Following station
Riverside toward Los Angeles	Southwest Chief	Victorville toward Chicago
Preceding station	Metrolink	Following station
Riverside–Downtown toward Oceanside	Inland Empire–Orange County Line	San Bernardino–Downtown Terminus
Rialto toward L.A. Union Station	San Bernardino Line	San Bernardino–Downtown Terminus
Rialto toward L.A. Union Station	San Bernardino Line (limited weekday service)	San Bernardino–Downtown toward Redlands
Former services
Preceding station	Amtrak	Following station
Fullerton toward Los Angeles	Desert Wind 1986-1997	Victorville toward Chicago
Pomona toward Los Angeles	Desert Wind 1979-1986	Victorville toward Chicago
Pomona toward Los Angeles	Southwest Chief 1984-1994	Victorville toward Chicago
Pomona toward Los Angeles	Southwest Limited 1974-1984	Victorville toward Chicago
Pomona toward Los Angeles	Super Chief 1971-1974	Barstow toward Chicago
Pomona toward Los Angeles	Las Vegas Limited 1976	Barstow toward Las Vegas
Preceding station	Atchison, Topeka and Santa Fe Railway	Following station
Rialto toward Los Angeles	Main Line Via Pasadena, Pomona	Devore toward Chicago
Colton Crossing toward Los Angeles	Main Line Via Fullerton, Riverside	Devore toward Chicago
Terminus	Redlands Loop	Arrowhead clockwise
Terminus	Redlands Loop	Victoria counterclockwise
Colton Crossing toward San Jacinto	San Jacinto Branch	Terminus
- Atchison, Topeka and Santa Fe Railway Passenger and Freight Depot
- U.S. National Register of Historic Places
- Architect: W.A. Mohr; Cresmer Manufacturing Co.
- Architectural style: Mission Revival/Moorish Revival/Spanish Colonial Revival
- NRHP reference No.: 01000025
- Added to NRHP: February 2, 2001
Track layout
Location

The San Bernardino Santa Fe Depot (Metrolink designation San Bernardino–Depot) is a Mission Revival Style passenger rail terminal in San Bernardino, California, United States. It has been the primary station for the city, serving Amtrak today, and the Santa Fe and Union Pacific Railroads in the past. Until the mid-20th century, the Southern Pacific Railroad had a station 3/4 of a mile away. It currently serves one Amtrak (Southwest Chief) and two Metrolink lines (Inland Empire–Orange County Line and San Bernardino Line). The depot is a historical landmark listed on the National Register of Historic Places as Atchison, Topeka and Santa Fe Railway Passenger and Freight Depot.

== Early history ==
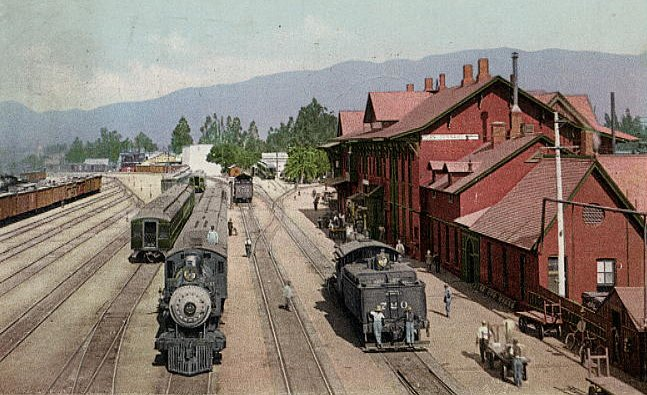
Trackside of the original San Bernardino Santa Fe Depot, 1915

Through its subsidiary California Southern Railroad, the Atchison, Topeka and Santa Fe Railway (ATSF) first built a two-and-a-half-story wooden structure on the site in 1886 to replace a converted boxcar that had been used as a temporary station. The 1886 building was mostly destroyed in a fire just after midnight November 17, 1916.

In the pre-Amtrak era the station not only had Santa Fe Railway trains, it also had Union Pacific Railroad trains. The trains of both railroads served disparate destinations in the west and in central United States. Local streetcar service was provided by the Pacific Electric on their Colton Line until 1942.

Named trains in 1960 included:

- Santa Fe:
  - Chief (Los Angeles to Chicago via Albuquerque and Kansas City)
  - El Capitan (Los Angeles to Chicago via Albuquerque and Kansas City)
  - Grand Canyon (Los Angeles to Chicago via Albuquerque and Kansas City)
  - Super Chief (Los Angeles to Chicago via Albuquerque and Kansas City)
- Union Pacific:
  - Challenger (Los Angeles to Chicago via Ogden, UT)
  - City of Los Angeles (Los Angeles to Chicago via Ogden, UT)
  - City of St. Louis (Los Angeles to St. Louis via Ogden, UT and Kansas City)

== Architecture and design ==
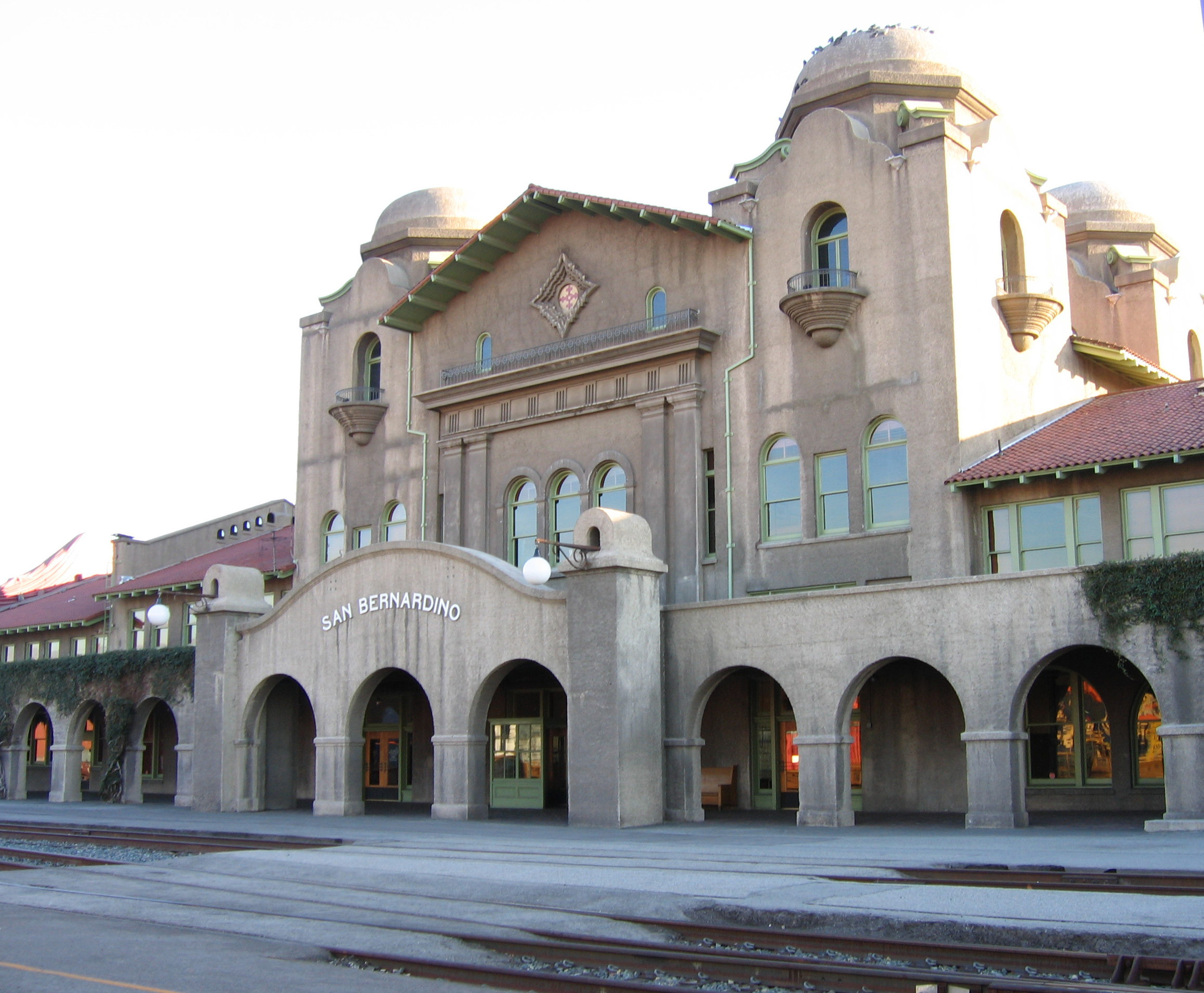
Trackside of the San Bernardino Santa Fe Depot

Local politicians requested ATSF to build a new station on a much larger scale than the previous. The new station, designed by architect W.A. Mohr, cost $800,000 (equivalent to $17,124,000 in 2025) to build and was officially opened on July 15, 1918. At that time, it was the largest railway station west of the Mississippi River. The San Bernardino Sun wrote "Santa Fe's Station to be the finest in the west." A few years after the depot's opening, an extension was added that included a Harvey House and living quarters.

The historic depot is built in the Mission Revival Style with Moorish Revival and Spanish Colonial Revival features. Utilizing hollow clay blocks, a red tile roof and stucco exterior, the depot was designed to withstand fire. Four domed towers are built around a large center lobby with polished tile walls and floor. The interior includes handcrafted high beams, coffered ceilings and decorative column capitals.

The depot was featured in Visiting... with Huell Howser Episode 711.

== Decline and renovation ==
The station saw heavy use throughout the 20th century. But like with many railroad stations, there was a gradual decline in usage with the advent of automobiles, buses and air travel. The Harvey House closed in the 1950s. In 1971, the ATSF transferred its passenger service to Amtrak. From 1979 to 1997 Amtrak's Desert Wind (Los Angeles-Las-Vegas-Denver-Chicago) made stops at the station. Metrolink began service to the station on May 17, 1993.

In 1992, San Bernardino Associated Governments (SANBAG) purchased the historic depot from Santa Fe. While Amtrak and Metrolink stopped using the depot in favor for a much smaller newer structure on the west side of the older one, SANBAG acquired over $15 million from federal and local grants and funds to begin an extensive restoration of the historic depot beginning in 2002. In 2004, SANBAG and Metrolink moved some of their offices there. After renovations are complete, SANBAG will share ownership with the City of San Bernardino and both agencies intend on leasing space in it. The historic depot waiting area, along with a new snack shop, opened again for Amtrak and Metrolink passengers on May 2, 2008. A new elevator, platforms, tracks, and an overpass were built in March and April 2017 as part of the Downtown San Bernardino Passenger Rail Project, an extension of Metrolink service to the San Bernardino Transit Center.

The San Bernardino Intermodal facility is directly adjacent to the station.

== Services ==
=== Metrolink ===
Metrolink at San Bernardino, California(2016)

San Bernardino Santa Fe Depot is served by 34 Metrolink San Bernardino Line trains (17 in each direction) each weekday, with trains arriving every 60 minutes all most of the day. Weekend service consists of 16 trains (8 in each direction) on both Saturday and Sunday, evenly spaced throughout the day.

Additionally, the station is served by 8 Metrolink Inland Empire–Orange County Line trains (4 in each direction) each weekday, running primarily at peak hours in the peak direction of travel. Weekend service consists of 4 trains (2 in each direction) on both Saturday and Sunday, heading towards Orange County in the morning and towards the Inland Empire in the evening.

=== Amtrak ===
Amtrak's Southwest Chief, which travels between Los Angeles and Chicago, Illinois, stops daily in each direction here.
