= Victor Valley =

Arid valley in southern California, United States

Coordinates: 34.5°N 117.3°W

The Victor Valley is a valley in the Mojave Desert and subregion of the Inland Empire, in San Bernardino County in Southern California.

It is located east of the Mojave's Antelope Valley, north of the Cajon Pass and the San Bernardino Valley, northeast of the San Gabriel Mountains, and northwest of the San Bernardino Mountains, and south of the Barstow area. The Mojave River flows northwards through the Victor Valley, primarily via underground aquifers.

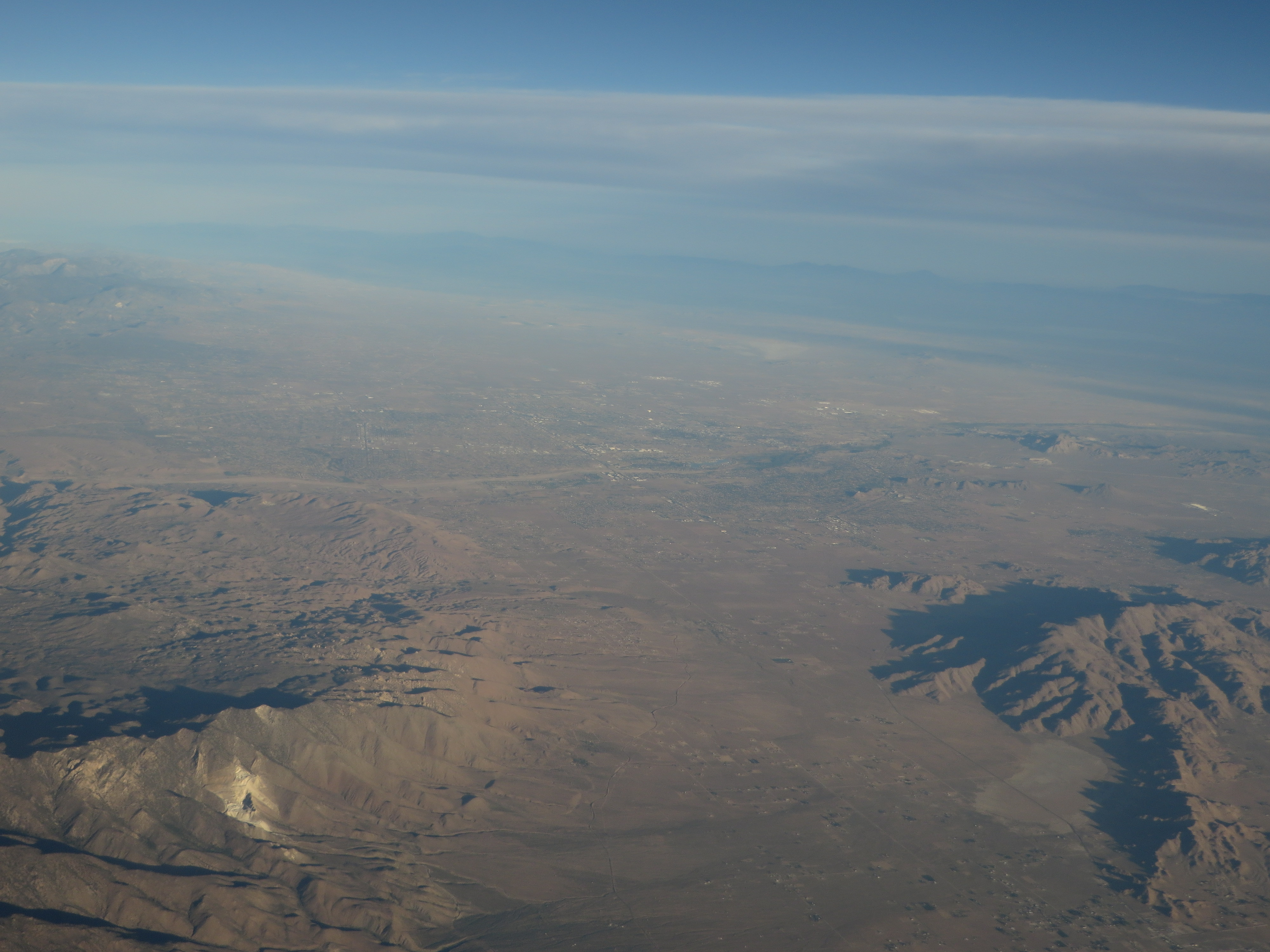
Aerial image of Victor Valley

Victor Valley (the Los Angeles metropolitan area)

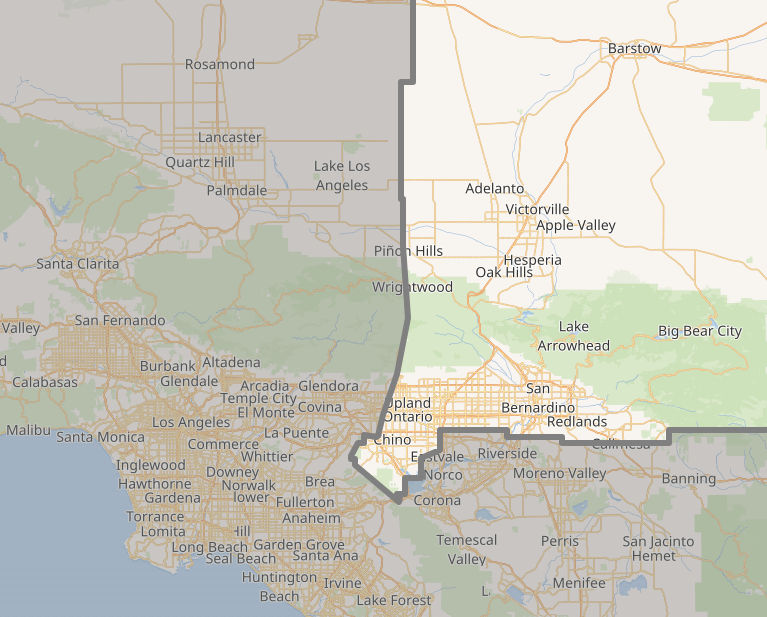
The Victor Valley of San Bernardino County focused around the upper Mojave River Valley. The Victor Valley largest communities include Victorville, Hesperia, and Apple Valley.

== Geography ==
=== Cities and towns ===
The Victor Valley contains four incorporated municipalities. The largest is Victorville. The rural desert valley region also has 15 unincorporated communities.

The Victor Valley has an estimated population of 362,549 (2024). The densest population is within a 10-mile (16 km) radius surrounding Victorville.

==== Over 100,000 population ====
- Victorville (population 134,810)
- Hesperia (population 100,971)

==== Over 50,000 population ====
- Apple Valley (population 75,791)

==== Over 20,000 population ====
- Adelanto (population 38,046)

==== Under 20,000 population ====
- Baldy Mesa
- Bell Mountain
- Bryman
- El Mirage
- Helendale
- La Delta
- Lucerne Valley—separate geographic valley to east, part of "cultural/economic" Victor Valley area.
- Mojave Heights
- Mountain View Acres
- Oak Hills
- Oro Grande
- Phelan
- Piñon Hills
- Silver Lakes
- Spring Valley Lake

== Transportation ==
The Victor Valley Transportation Center is an intermodal transit center in Victorville, that is served by Amtrak, Greyhound, the Victor Valley Transit Authority and military shuttles to Fort Irwin. The center also serves as a Park and Ride facility for carpooling commuters.

=== Rail ===
Amtrak serves Victorville and Barstow with once-daily trips on the Southwest Chief, and connecting Amtrak California Thruway bus service several times daily.

The soon to be constructed Brightline West high-speed rail line between Las Vegas and Rancho Cucamonga and eventually Los Angeles via Palmdale will have a stop at the Victor Valley station.

=== Public transportation ===
Public transportation, provided by the Victor Valley Transit Authority (VVTA), serves most of cities and communities of the Victor Valley area. VVTA offers subsidized tickets for Greyhound Line busses to Barstow and San Bernardino. The Barstow Area Transit serves Barstow and its surrounding communities to the north. The two transit systems connect via the B-V Link service. Amtrak also serves the Valley at Victorville station.

Greyhound Lines buses stop at the Victor Valley Transportation Center.

=== Highways ===
- Interstate 15—primary freeway through the Victor Valley.
- U.S. Route 395
- Historic U.S. Route 66
- California State Route 18—Rim of the World Highway
- California State Route 138—Pearblossom Highway

=== Air ===
- Victorville Airport (Southern California Logistics Airport), charter and general aviation, no commercial passenger services.
- Apple Valley Airport, general aviation, fuel, aircraft rental, flight instruction.
- Hesperia Airport, general aviation.

== Government ==
Political representation includes:

- California's 23rd congressional district
- California's 21st State Senate district
- California's 33rd State Assembly district

=== Education ===
- Victor Valley College
- Victor Valley Union High School District

== Attractions ==
- Victor Valley Museum and Art Gallery—in Apple Valley.
- The California Route 66 Museum—in Victorville.
- Mojave Narrows Regional Park—at the surfacing of the Mojave River, in Victorville.
- The Mall of Victor Valley
- Victor Valley Memorial Park—in Victorville.
- Hulaville Forest, site of former folk art environment.

Nearby summer/winter recreation

- San Gabriel Mountains + Angeles National Forest, including Wrightwood area.
- San Bernardino Mountains + San Bernardino National Forest.

== See also ==
- Mojave Desert topics
