= Fontana station (California) =

Railway station in Fontana, California

Fontana
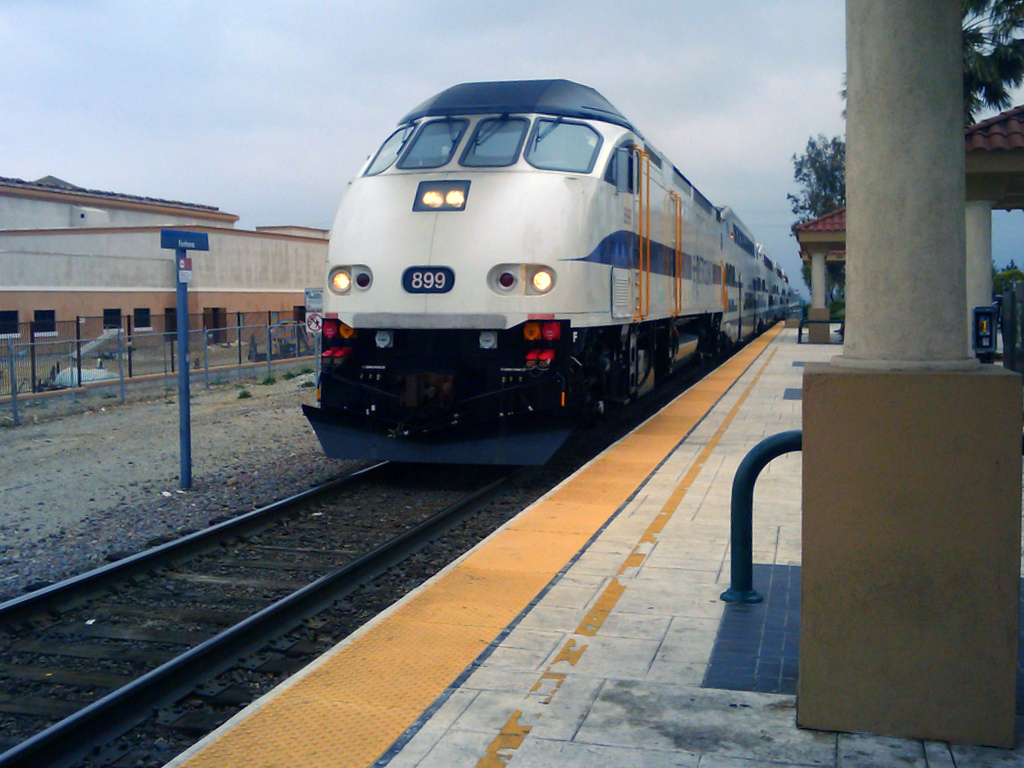
- Metrolink train at Fontana station enroute to San Bernardino

General information
- Location: 16777 Orange Way; Fontana, California; United States
- Coordinates: 34.0952°N 117.4381°W
- Owner: City of Fontana
- Line: SCRRA San Gabriel Subdivision
- Platforms: 1 side platform
- Tracks: 1
- Connections: Omnitrans: 10, 14, 15, 19, 20, 61, 66, 67, 82, 312; Victor Valley Transit Authority: 15

Construction
- Structure type: At-grade
- Parking: 309 spaces
- Accessible: Yes

History
- Opened: November 22, 1993; 32 years ago

Passengers
- FY 2026: 440 (avg. wkdy boardings)

Services
| Preceding station | Metrolink | Following station |
|---|---|---|
| Rancho Cucamonga toward L.A. Union Station | San Bernardino Line | Rialto toward San Bernardino or Redlands |
Former services
| Preceding station | Metrolink | Following station |
|---|---|---|
| Auto Club Speedway (race days) toward L.A. Union Station | San Bernardino Line | Rialto toward San Bernardino or Redlands |
Location

Fontana station is a train station served by Metrolink San Bernardino Line commuter rail, located in the city of Fontana, California. It is immediately adjacent to Fontana's Downtown District. The station opened on November 22, 1993, and is owned by the City of Fontana.

== Hours and Frequency ==
The Fontana station is served by 32 Metrolink San Bernardino Line trains (16 in each direction) on weekdays, between 4:00 a.m. and 11:10 p.m. Weekend train service is less: 16 trains (8 in each direction) on Saturdays and Sundays between 6:55 a.m. and 11:03 p.m.

The Omnitrans public bus service maintains a transit center next to the station and connections are available to Victor Valley Transit Authority (VVTA). Omnitrans Route 61 connects to Ontario Airport.
