= Rialto station =

Commuter rail station in California

Rialto
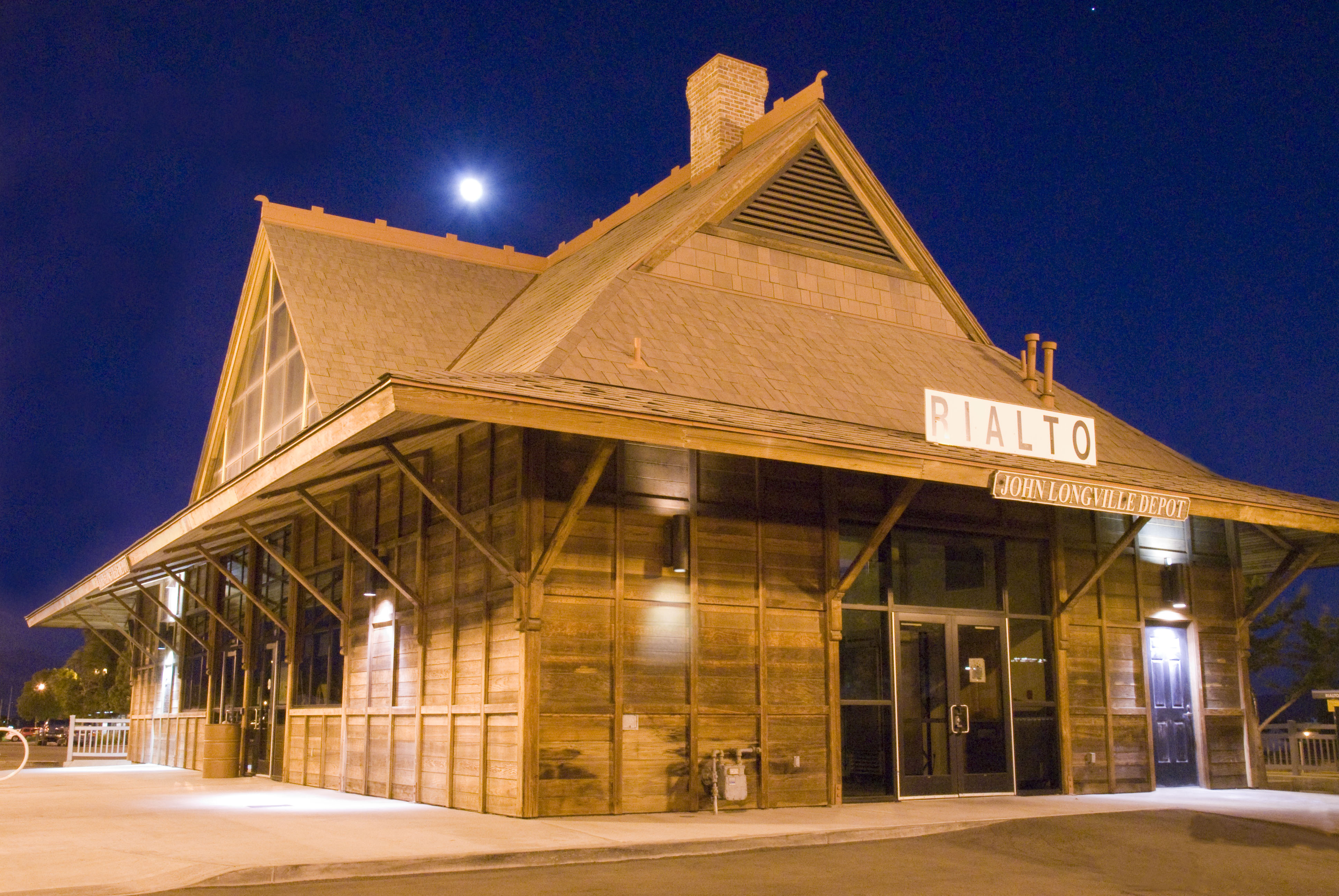
- John Longville Depot at Rialto station

General information
- Location: 292 South Palm Avenue; Rialto, California; United States
- Coordinates: 34.0969°N 117.3729°W
- Owner: City of Rialto
- Line: SCRRA San Gabriel Subdivision
- Platforms: 1 side platform
- Tracks: 1
- Connections: Omnitrans: 15, 22

Construction
- Parking: 280 spaces, 9 accessible spaces
- Accessible: Yes

History
- Opened: May 17, 1993

Passengers
- FY 2026: 267 (avg. wkdy boardings)

Services
| Preceding station | Metrolink | Following station |
|---|---|---|
| Fontana toward L.A. Union Station | San Bernardino Line | San Bernardino–Depot toward San Bernardino or Redlands |
Location

Rialto station (also known as the John Longville Depot) is a Metrolink San Bernardino Line station located at 292 South Palm Avenue in Rialto, California, just south of Rialto Avenue off of Riverside Avenue. The station is named for former Assemblymember and Rialto Mayor John Longville.

The station is owned by the city of Rialto and was designed as a replica of the former 1888-built Atchison, Topeka and Santa Fe Railway frame-built structure.

The Rialto station is served by 32 Metrolink San Bernardino Line trains (16 in each direction) on weekdays, between 3:54 a.m. and 11:16 p.m. Weekend train service is less: 16 trains (8 in each direction) on Saturdays and Sundays between 6:48 a.m. and 11:09 p.m.

Omnitrans route 22 stops at the eastern side of the station at Rialto and Riverside. Route 15 stops at Riverside and Merrill, three blocks to the south.
