= El Garces Intermodal Transportation Facility =

Railway station in Needles, California

Needles, CA
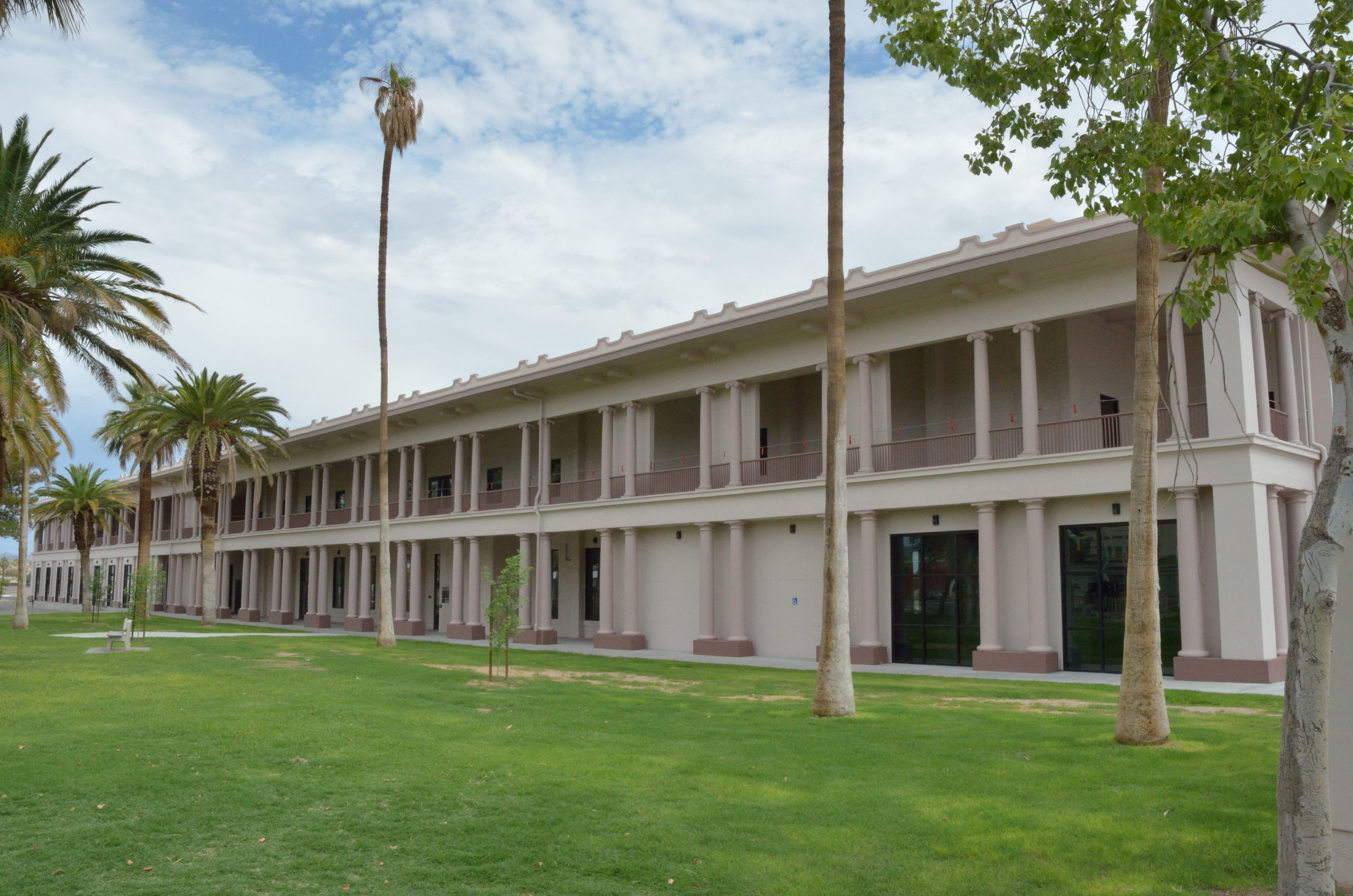
- El Garces Intermodal Transportation Facility in July 2014

General information
- Other names: El Garces Intermodal Transportation Facility
- Location: 950 Front Street; Needles, California; United States
- Coordinates: 34°50′27″N 114°36′20″W
- Owner: City of Needles/BNSF Railway
- Lines: BNSF Southern Transcon (Needles Subdivision, Seligman Subdivision)
- Platforms: 1 side and 1 island platform
- Tracks: 3
- Connections: Victor Valley Transit Authority: 200; Needles Area Transit

Construction
- Parking: Yes
- Accessible: Yes

Other information
- Station code: Amtrak: NDL

History
- Opened: 1908

Passengers
- FY 2025: 7,395 (Amtrak)

Services
Preceding station	Amtrak	Following station
Barstow toward Los Angeles	Southwest Chief	Kingman toward Chicago
Former services
Preceding station	Atchison, Topeka and Santa Fe Railway	Following station
Goffs toward Los Angeles	Main Line	Topock toward Chicago
- El Garces
- U.S. National Register of Historic Places
- Location: Needles, California
- Built: 1908
- Architect: Francis W. Wilson
- Architectural style: Classical Revival
- NRHP reference No.: 02000537
- Added to NRHP: May 17, 2002
Location

El Garces Intermodal Transportation Facility (also known as Needles station) is an Amtrak intercity rail station and bus depot in downtown Needles, California. The structure was originally built in 1908 as El Garces, a Harvey House and Atchison, Topeka and Santa Fe Railway (ATSF) station. It is named for Francisco Garcés, a Spanish missionary who surveyed the area in the 1770s. It was added to the National Register of Historic Places in 2002.

The Southern Pacific Railroad and ATSF subsidiary Atlantic and Pacific Railroad met at Needles and opened a station there in 1883. The Southern Pacific sold its line to the ATSF the next year, and Needles became a major waypoint on the ATSF route to Los Angeles. After the original station was destroyed by fire in 1906, the ATSF built El Garces – a large neoclassical structure containing a Harvey House hotel, restaurant, and train station – in 1908. It was the "crown jewel" of the Harvey House network, and among the first train stations made of concrete.

The hotel and restaurant closed in 1949 as passenger traffic declined. The ATSF converted the interior for office space and baggage use in the 1950s, and demolished the eastern third of the building in 1961. In 1988, the railroad abandoned El Garces entirely; the city purchased the building in 1999 and reopened it as the El Garces Intermodal Transportation Facility in 2014. In 2016, Amtrak opened a dedicated waiting room for Southwest Chief passengers.

== History ==
=== Original station ===
By the 1880s, the Southern Pacific Railroad (SP) and Atchison, Topeka and Santa Fe Railroad (ATSF) were in competition to monopolize the rapidly growing Southwestern United States. On August 9, 1883, the SP completed its line eastward from Mojave, California to Needles, where it met the westward-expanding ATSF subsidiary Atlantic and Pacific Railroad. The depot – a utilitarian, one-story wood structure – was among the first buildings constructed in the new town.

The ATSF soon believed that the SP would redirect traffic away from the Needles interchange in favor of its longer Overland Route and Sunset Route, which would be more profitable for the SP. The ATSF threatened to build a competing line west from Needles; in August 1884, the SP sold the Mojave–Needles line to the Atlantic and Pacific. In 1898, the ATSF added a Harvey House and retrofitted the depot with a second story with hotel rooms to house passengers and Harvey House staff. The station was destroyed by fire on September 6, 1906.

=== El Garces ===
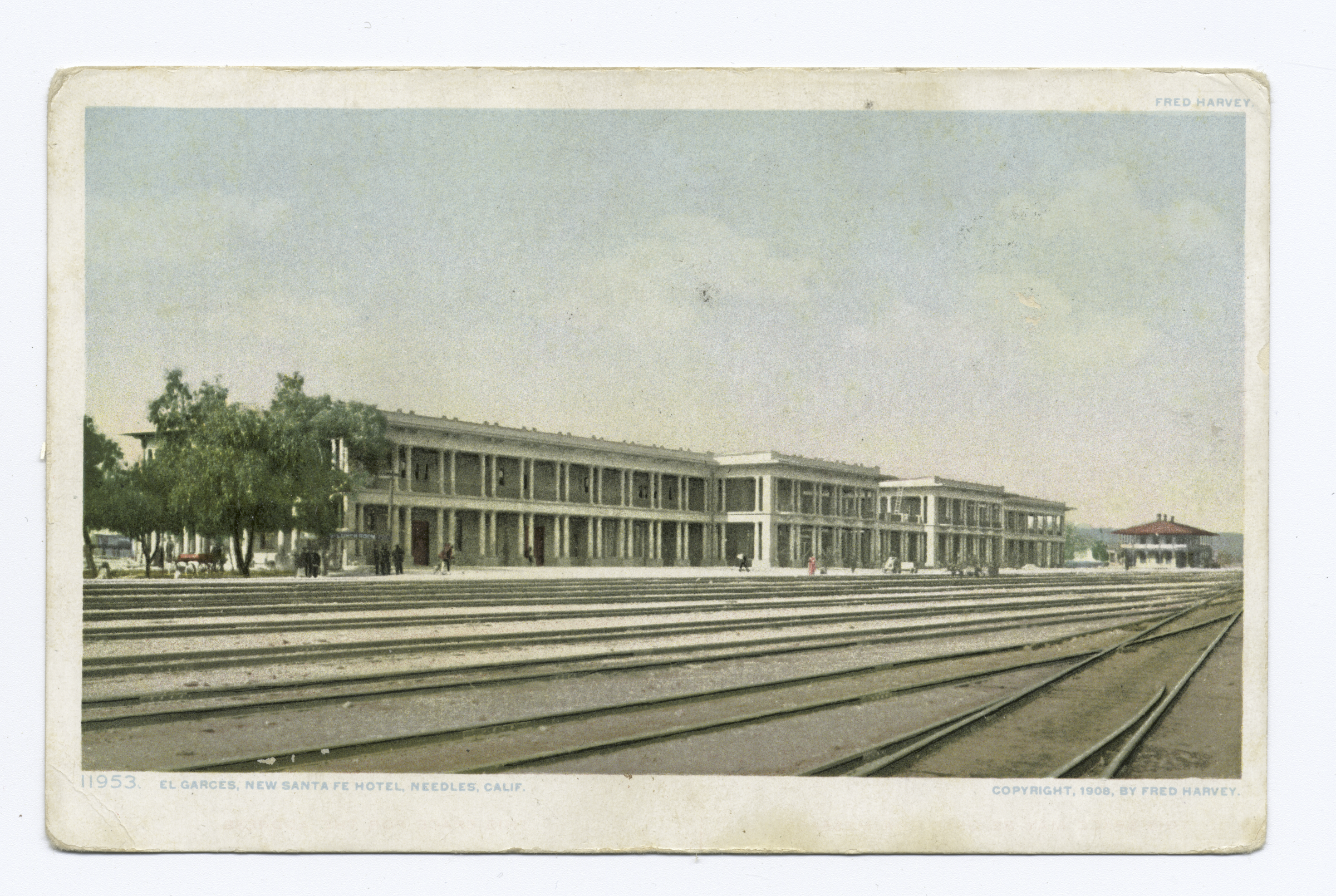
An early Fred Harvey postcard of El Garces

The ATSF saw the construction of a new station as an opportunity to promote Needles as a tourist destination (and thus bring passenger revenue to the railroad). Architect Francis W. Wilson was hired to design the new depot at Needles, which combined a railroad station, dining room, and hotel into a single massive structure. Opened on April 3, 1908, it cost $250,000 (equivalent to $6,300,000 in 2025) to construct. The building was originally 518 feet (158 m) long and 98 feet (30 m) wide; much of the construction was done by local Mojave people. It was built of cast in place concrete, which served as a heat sink to moderate the daytime heat and nighttime chill of the desert, and was the first ATSF station constructed with concrete. The hotel was named El Garces after Spanish missionary Padre Francisco Garcés, who surveyed the area in the 1770s en route between the old California missions and Southern Arizona.

Most ATSF stations were built in the Mission Revival style, but Wilson instead designed El Garces in the Classical Revival (neoclassical) style more common in East Coast stations. The distinct style was intended to give Needles a modern reputation, and fit in with the Fred Harvey Company policy of using updated styles. The ground floor included a lobby, dining room, lunch room, kitchen, laundry, and various facilities; the second floor was occupied by 64 hotel rooms. Both floors were surrounded by wide verandas. El Garces was the "Crown Jewel" of the entire Fred Harvey chain. It was staffed by the famous Harvey Girls, among whom it was a desirable assignment.

In 1912, the original fountain in the central portico was replaced by a newsstand, and the lunch room was remodeled. The lunch room was remodeled again in 1922, with the original painted concrete floor replaced with mosaic tiles, and a third time in 1927. El Garces was used to feed soldiers on troop trains during World War II, and George S. Patton frequented the hotel during war games in the surrounding desert. Faced with declining patronage as automobiles and airlines replaced long-distance train travel, the Harvey Company closed El Garces in 1949.

The ATSF continued to use the structure and made renovations in the 1950s. The dining room was subdivided for office space, while the kitchen was converted to a baggage room, and a modern air conditioning system was installed. In 1961, the railroad demolished the east part of El Garces (which had formerly had a ticket office, baggage room, and offices on the first floor) to build a parking lot, reducing the length to 365 feet (111 m). Although passenger facilities were now limited, the station was served by trains including the Super Chief and El Capitan until Amtrak took over intercity passenger service in the United States on May 1, 1971. Amtrak kept just a single train – the combined Super Chief/El Capitan – on the ATSF. The train (renamed Super Chief in 1973, Southwest Limited in 1974, and Southwest Chief in 1984) continued passenger service to Needles. The ATSF abandoned El Garces in 1988 and moved its offices to a former railroad medical building slightly to the south.

=== Restoration ===
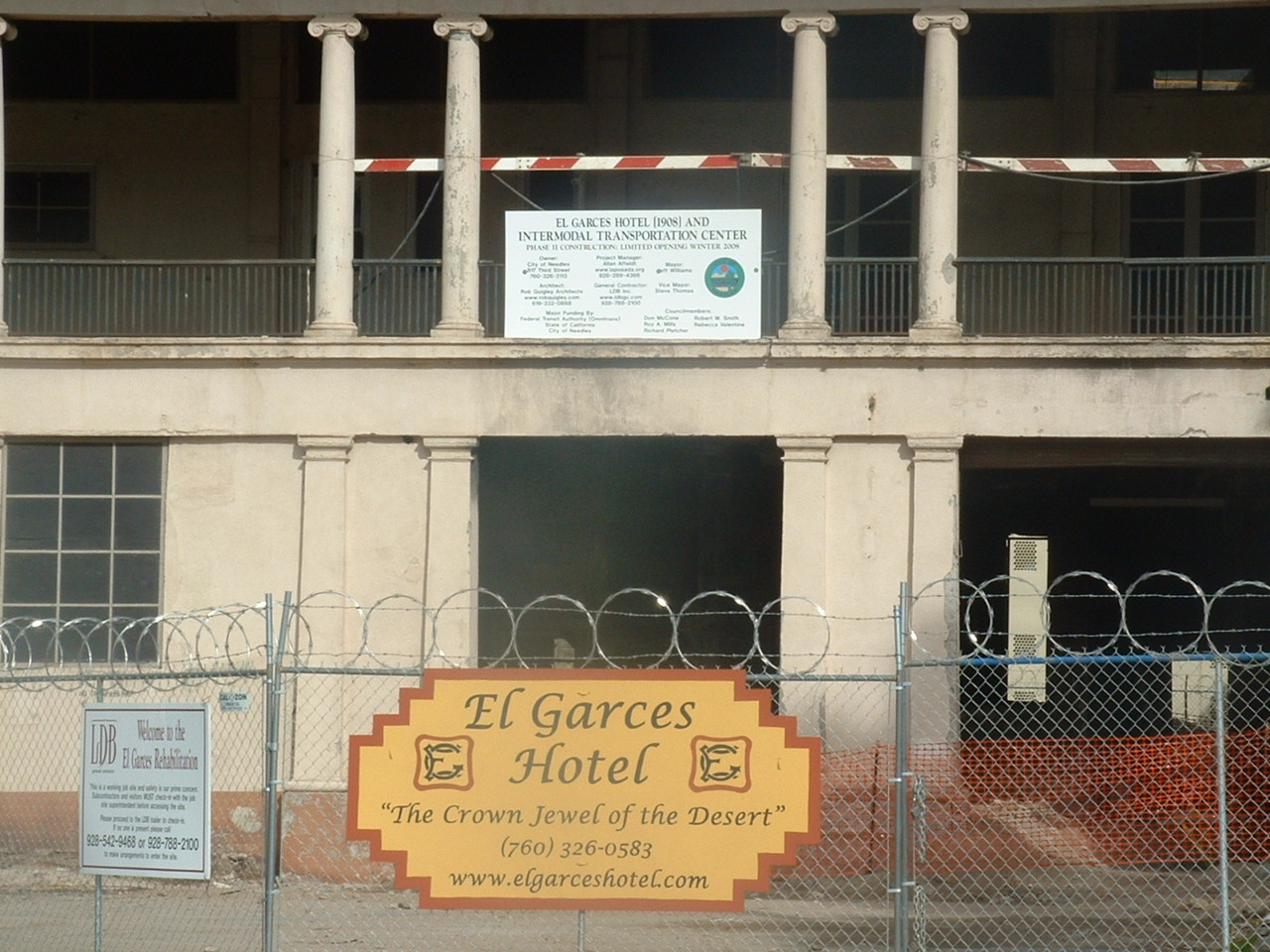
El Garces during construction in 2007

In 1993, the Friends of the El Garces was formed in response to the possibility of demolition. A fire in 1995 damaged part of the former kitchen area. In 1999, the city purchased the structure from BNSF Railway (the successor to the ATSF). State-funded work to stabilize the building was completed in July 2001. El Garces was added to the National Register of Historic Places on May 17, 2002.

The city-developed plan involved reuse of El Garces for its original purposes: a hotel, restaurant, and railroad station. Construction began on March 7, 2007. The project was managed by the owners of the La Posada Hotel, another Harvey House that had successfully been reused, with the city intending to sell El Garces to one (Allan Affeldt). By 2010, the project reached a standstill, as the municipal ownership prevented Affeldt from obtaining loans, and federal tax credits would be threatened by plans to enclose the upper veranda for modern bathrooms. Because the Federal Transit Administration (FTA) would not allow the property to be transferred to private ownership if federal money was used for renovations, Affeldt left the project so that the city could use the federal funds.

The city ultimately obtained $9 million in FTA funds and $2.4 million in state and county funds for the project, which was narrowed to focus on renovating part of the first floor for transportation use by Needles Area Transit and Amtrak. The $12 million project to create the El Garces Intermodal Transportation Facility was completed in 2014. Amtrak opened a waiting room – open during the overnight hours before the Southwest Chief arrives – on May 7, 2016.
