= Colton Line =

Streetcar line in California, U.S.

Colton
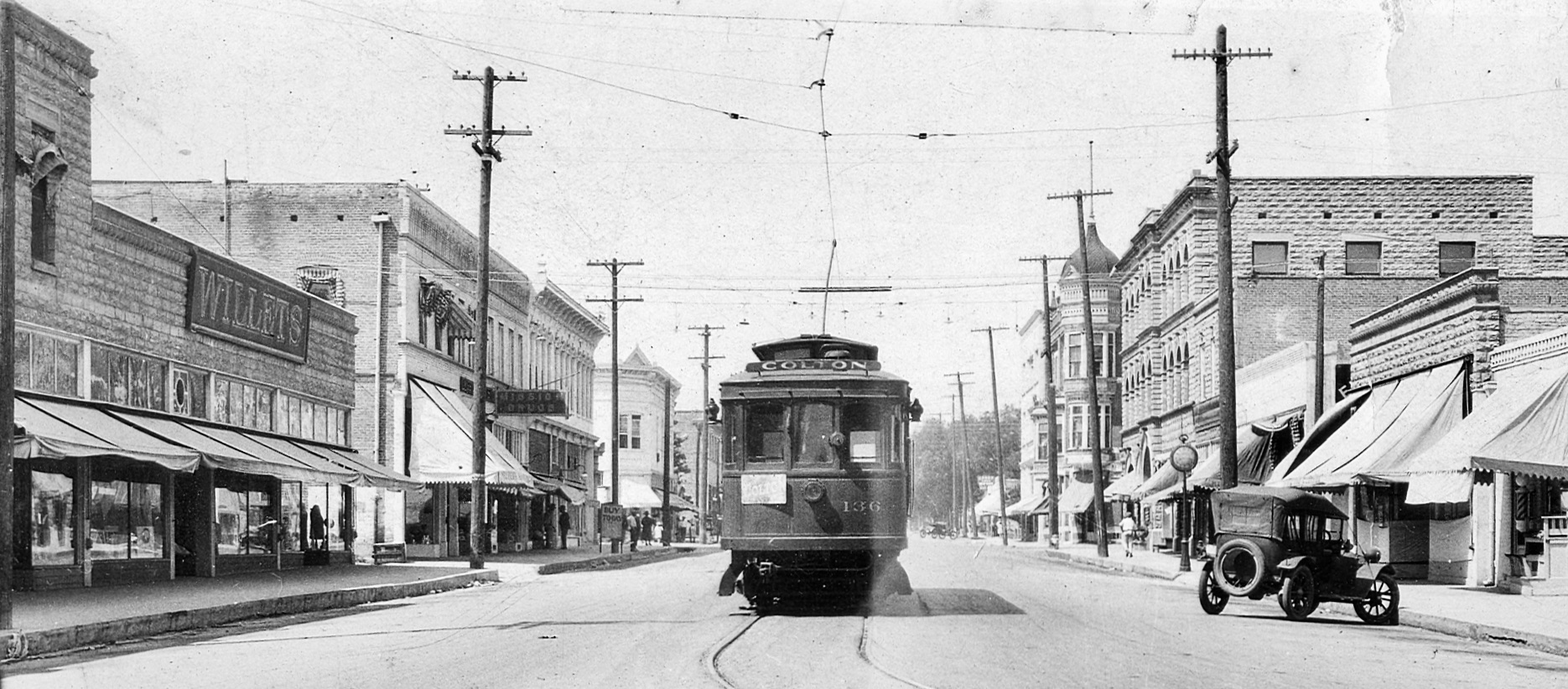
- Car 136 in service on 8th Street in Colton, 1910

Overview
- Locale: Inland Empire
- Termini: San Bernardino; Colton

Service
- Type: Streetcar
- System: Pacific Electric

History
- Opened: 1902
- Closed: February 22, 1942

Technical
- Line length: 4.24 mi (6.82 km)
- Number of tracks: 1
- Track gauge: 1,435 mm (4 ft 8 1/2 in) standard gauge
- Electrification: Overhead line, 600 V DC

The Colton Line was a local streetcar line, mostly known as being a service of the Pacific Electric. It operated between Colton and San Bernardino, one of two lines in service between the two cities.

== History ==
The line was established by the San Bernardino Valley Traction Company. The first cars operated over the line on February 22, 1902, but a derailment at Third and E in San Bernardino necessitated more work on the line. Initially planned to open for revenue service on August 26, 1902, the opening was eventually delayed to September 2. However, the Southern Pacific Railroad opposed the new line crossing their steam line in Colton and delayed opening further. The company was absorbed into the Pacific Electric in 1911. In 1913 the service was through-routed with the D Street–Highland Avenue Line. Completion of the more direct San Bernardino–Riverside Line in late 1914 greatly reduced demand on the line, with ridership reduced by more than half on the old line the following year. Despite its lesser popularity, the Colton Line outlasted the shorter route, remaining in service until February 22, 1942.

== Route ==
The line started at the Colton station at 9th and J Streets near Colton Crossing where passengers interchanged with transcontinental trains. Cars ran west on J for a block before turning north on 8th Street. At Vernon Avenue, the tracks ran northward until the main line at 3rd Street where a right turn continued into San Bernardino.

The line connected the joint Pacific Electric and Southern Pacific stations in San Bernardino and Colton via the San Bernardino Santa Fe Depot.
