= San Bernardino Associated Governments =

Government agency in San Bernardino County, California, United States

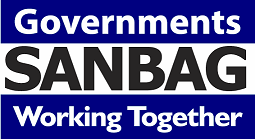
SANBAG logo.

San Bernardino Associated Governments (SANBAG or SanBAG) was an association of the San Bernardino County local governments and the regional transportation planning agency and regional planning organization for the county, with policy makers consisting of mayors, councilmembers, and county supervisors. It was also the funding agency for the county's transit systems, which include Omnitrans, Victor Valley Transit Authority, Morongo Basin Transit Authority, Mountain Area Regional Transit Authority, Barstow Area Transport, and Needles Area Transit.

In January 2017, SANBAG split into the San Bernardino County Transportation Authority (SBCTA) and San Bernardino Council of Governments (SBCOG).
