= Baldy Mesa, California =

Unincorporated community in California, United States

- Unincorporated community
- Location of Baldy Mesa in California Baldy Mesa, California (the United States)
- Coordinates: 34°27′33″N 117°27′01″W
- Country: United States
- State: California
- County: San Bernardino
- Elevation: 3,488 ft (1,063 m)
- Time zone: UTC-8 (PST)
  - Summer (DST): UTC-7 (PDT)

Baldy Mesa is an unincorporated community in the Victor Valley of the Mojave Desert, within San Bernardino County, California. It is a rural desert community north of the Cajon Pass and the San Gabriel Mountains.
