= Mountain Transit =

Regional transit agency in California

- Parent: Mountain Area Regional Transit Authority
- Founded: 1993
- Headquarters: Big Bear
- Service area: Big Bear Valley, Running Springs, Lake Arrowhead, Crestline, and Valley of Enchanment to San Bernardino
- Service type: Bus service, Dial a Ride
- Routes: 9
- Hubs: 2
- Fleet: 26 buses
- Annual ridership: 796,327 passengers (FY 2024)
- Chief executive: Sandy Benson
- Website: mountaintransit.org

Mountain Transit (legally the Mountain Area Regional Transit Authority) is the third largest regional transit agency in San Bernardino County, California. Mountain Transit serves the San Bernardino Mountain communities of Crestline, Lake Arrowhead, Running Springs, and Big Bear Lake, providing local service for more than 163,000 passengers each year.

Mountain Transit also offers Off-The-Mountain (OTM) service that enables the residents of the mountain communities to connect with major stops in San Bernardino, which include Metrolink, Omnitrans, Greyhound, St. Bernadine's Hospital, and other stops along the way. This service runs Mondays, Wednesdays, and Fridays from Big Bear, and Monday through Saturday from the RIM area. The Off-The-Mountain service allows mountain residents to commute to their jobs in the San Bernardino valley with two trips from Big Bear and four trips from Crestline/Lake Arrowhead weekdays.

Mountain Transit serves an area of 269 square miles.

== Route overview ==
=== Fixed route ===
Route	Terminals		Via	Notes
Red Line	Big Bear Lake; Knickerbocker Rd & Pedder Rd	Big Bear City; State Ln & Central Ln	Big Bear Bl	Serves Big Bear Mountain Resort
Blue Line	Big Bear Lake; Knickerbocker Rd & Pedder Rd	Big Bear Lake; Willow Landing Rd & Blue Jay Rd	Lakeview Dr	Serves Alpine Side at Magic Mountain
Gold Line	Big Bear Lake; Pine Knot Av & Maryland Rd	Big Bear Lake; Paradise Wy & Mountain View Bl	Big Bear Bl	
2	Crestline; Byron Rd & Vista Ln	Lake Arrowhead; Mountain Community Hospital	Hwy 138, Hwy 173	
4	Running Springs; Arrowbear Lake	Lake Arrowhead Mountain Community Hospital	Hilltop Bl, Hwy 173	Serves SkyPark at Santa's Village
5	Big Bear Lake; Fox Farm Rd & Sandalwood Dr	San Bernardino; San Bernardino Transit Center	Big Bear Bl, City Creek Rd	Serves Snow Valley Mountain Resort and San Bernardino Santa Fe Depot
6	Lake Arrowhead; Lake Arrowhead Village	San Bernardino; San Bernardino Transit Center	Lakes Edge Rd, Waterman Av	Serves San Bernardino Santa Fe Depot
8 Crestline Summer Trolley	Lake Arrowhead; SkyPark at Santa's Village	Crestline; Lake Dr & Springy Path	Hwy 18, Lake Gregory Dr	
10 Lake Arrowhead Summer Trolley	Lake Arrowhead; SkyPark at Santa's Village	Twin Peaks; Grandview Rd & Hwy 189	Hwy 18	

== Fares ==
Mountain Transit offers both standard daily fares and discounted multi-trip and multi-day passes. Seniors, persons with disabilities, and veterans receive a discounted fare of 50% off. The fares also vary depending if the trip is local or off the mountain. If the fares are for Off the Mountain service, the extra fees apply.

In 2021, local bus routes in the Big Bear valley were made free as a way to reduce congestion within Big Bear

In 2023, bus routes in Crestline and Lake Arrowhead were made free as a way to reduce congestion.

== Governance ==
Mountain Transit is administered by a board of directors made up five members: two from Big Bear Lake, one member at large, and two Supervisors of the County of San Bernardino. It is required under the JPA that the board of directors meet at least one time each quarter of each fiscal year. Board meetings are held the third Monday of every month (except January* and February*) at 1:00 p.m. with location alternating between Big Bear Lake and Crestline. All meetings are held in compliance with the Ralph M. Brown Act. Board meetings are presided over by the board-appointed chair. The board of directors is responsible for adopting the budget, appointing the CEO/General Manager, appointing a technical committee, establishing policy, and adopting rules and regulations for the conduct of business.
