= Colton Crossing =

Railway crossing in Colton, California

Coordinates: 34.065565°N 117.328124°W

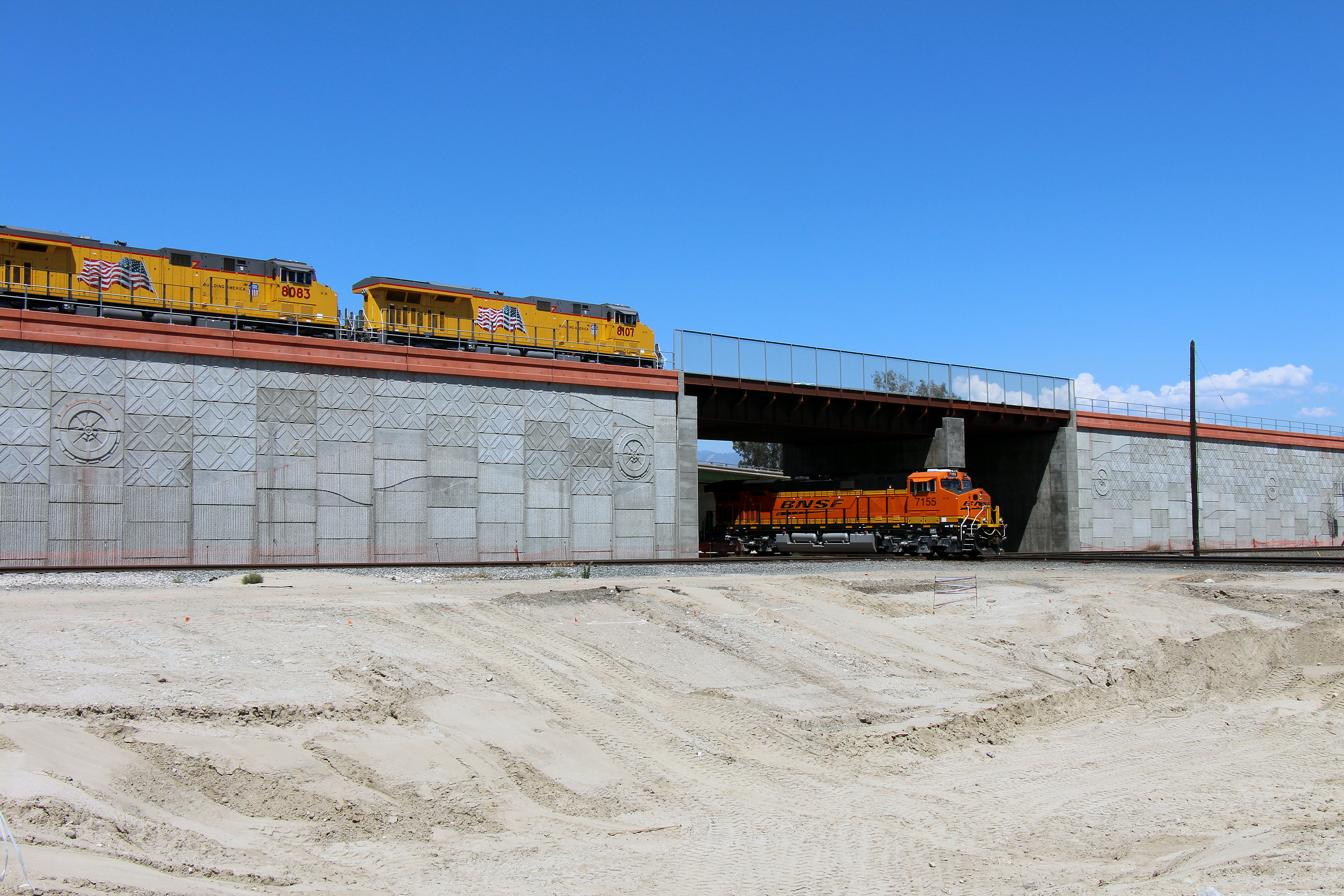
Colton Crossing in 2013

Colton Crossing is a railway crossing situated in Colton, California, directly south of Interstate 10. It is where the Sunset Route and the Southern Transcon intersect.

First built in 1883, it was the site of one of the most intense frog wars in railroad construction history, leading to a personal confrontation between famed lawman Virgil Earp and California Governor Robert Waterman. The crossing was the intersection of the tracks for the Santa Fe (ATSF) and Southern Pacific (SP) railroads. The tracks are now owned by the SP's and the ATSF's successors, the Union Pacific (UP) and the Burlington Northern Santa Fe (BNSF) railroads respectively.

The UP tracks run east–west at the crossing while the BNSF tracks run north–south (the BNSF tracks eventually head west to Los Angeles and Long Beach, parallel to the UP tracks). Metrolink trains and Amtrak's Southwest Chief use the BNSF tracks through the crossing while Amtrak's Sunset Limited use the UP tracks. The UP tracks come from the east through the Coachella Valley and into the yard in West Colton (onwards to Los Angeles). On the other hand, the BNSF tracks from the indirect west (Los Angeles) and direct south (Riverside and Corona) continue through the crossing and on to the yard in San Bernardino, which then head up north to Cajon Pass and eventually Barstow on the journey to Chicago.

== History ==
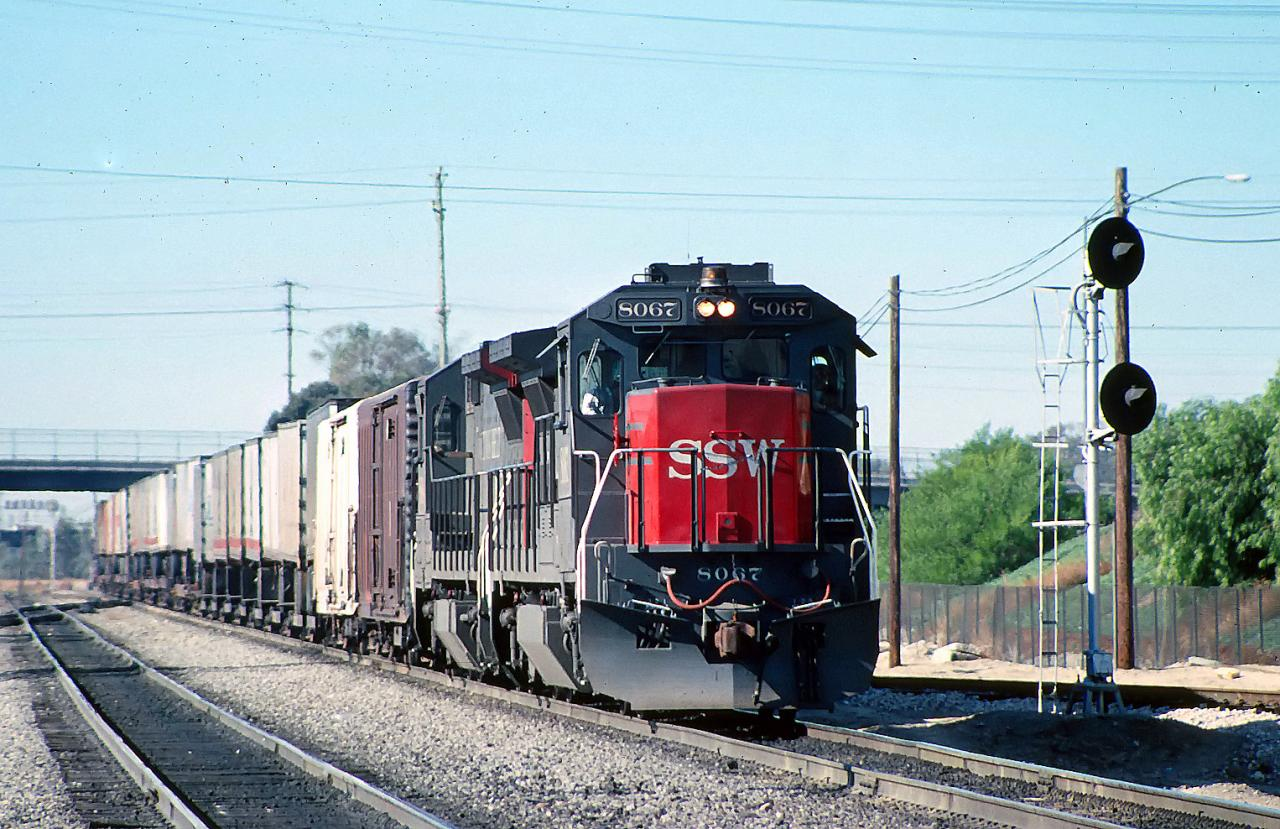
Colton Crossing in 1989

Construction of the California Southern Railroad, a subsidiary of the Atchison, Topeka and Santa Fe Railway (ATSF), was repeatedly interrupted by the Santa Fe's rival, the Southern Pacific Railroad (SP). In one instance, California Southern was set to build a level junction across SP tracks in Colton. California Southern engineer Fred T. Perris ordered the crossing built and acquired the track section for the railroad. When the track was delivered to National City in July 1883, SP officials hired the sheriff there to seize the track section and prevent its installation. The sheriff kept the track under 24-hour guard, but Perris's men were able to retake the track while the sheriff napped, loaded the track on a flatcar and started northward with it toward Colton, where it was to be installed.

Perris obtained a court order on August 11, 1883, that would legally allow California Southern to install the new track section.

Jacob Nash Victor, a California Southern construction engineer, was the foreman at Colton. In a letter that Victor wrote to Thomas Nickerson, then president of the California Southern, he stated:

I thought it advisable to have final order of court printed and each SP employee served. It was also asserted that headquarters at San Francisco had not received the final order. The danger of a riot was so imminent, by legal advice I had the order telegraphed to the Sheriff at SF to serve on the President or Secy. ... In the meantime the Sheriff [in Colton] had organized a posse, with arms and was waiting for order of court to clear the track, on our application.

Perris' crew was ready to install it as soon as SP's Overland Mail passed the point of intersection between the two railroads. However, at that moment an SP locomotive arrived at the scene pulling a single gondola and stopped. The engineer of the SP locomotive then drove the train back and forth slowly at the crossing point in an effort to prevent the California Southern crew from installing the crossing. Southern Pacific had hired the lawman Virgil Earp to guard its tracks in Colton and he rode in the cab.

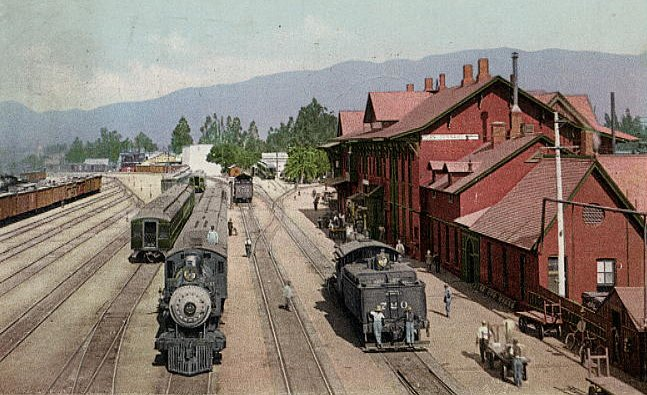
The station and yards at San Bernardino in 1915. A year later, the station was destroyed by fire.

The citizens of Colton supported Southern Pacific, but Southern Pacific had bypassed nearby San Bernardino and its residents were upset. They hoped the California Southern line would put their city back on the map. On the morning of September 13, events reached a head in a confrontation that was quickly dubbed the "Battle of the Crossing". Citizens from Colton and San Bernardino gathered on either side of the tracks—San Bernardino residents on the north and the citizens from Colton on the south—with the Southern Pacific locomotive between them. Men on both sides carried picks, shovels, shotguns and revolvers. Virgil Earp stood in the gangway between cab and tender facing the San Bernardino mob, his revolver in hand. It was believed that the gondola held a number of SP men with rifles and other weapons who crouched below the walls of the car so as not to be seen.

Governor of California Robert Waterman ordered San Bernardino County Sheriff J.B. Burkhart to enforce the court order. Burkhart deputized 10 dependable men and personally escorted the governor to the crossing site. Waterman stood between the SP locomotive and the San Bernardino mob and read the court order. The governor said the locomotive must be cleared away at once. He told Virgil Earp that if he made any move with his six-shooter, Burkhart and his deputies were authorized to shoot. The tension between the crowds, lawmen, and governor made a gun fight likely—perhaps bloodier than his Tombstone shootout. Earp realized that further resistance was hopeless and would lead to bloodshed. He holstered his weapon and ordered the engineer to move the locomotive.

The track was cleared and the crossing was installed. The first train from San Diego arrived in Colton on August 21, 1882 (before the crossing was installed), and the first train to San Bernardino arrived just over a year later on September 13, 1883.

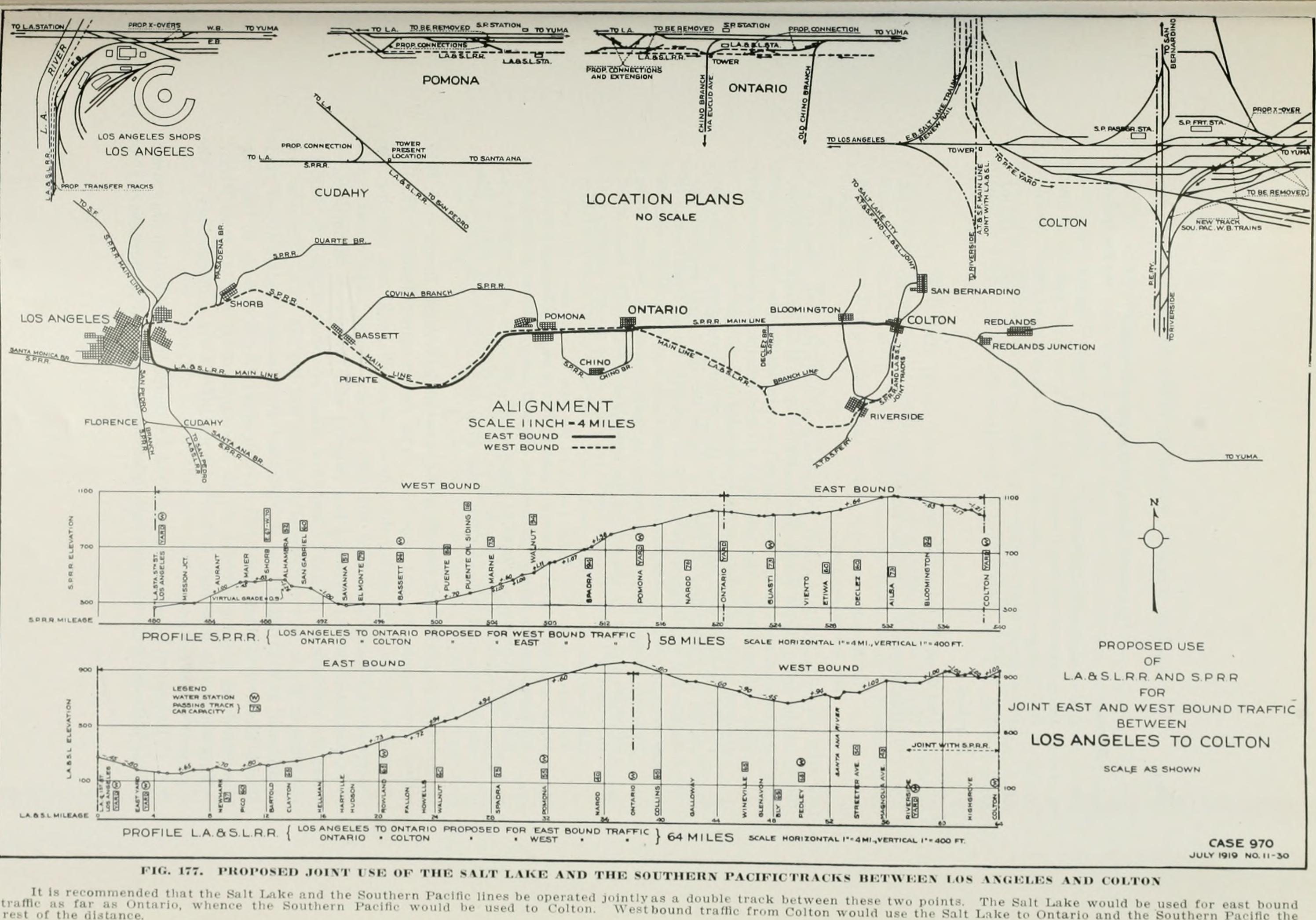
A schematic of the crossing in 1919, at the time served by four railroads: the Atchison, Topeka and Santa Fe Railway, the Los Angeles and Salt Lake Railroad (later Union Pacific), the Southern Pacific, and Pacific Electric. The eastern diamond has since been removed.

== Grade separation and flyover ==
The City of Colton was the site of the Colton Crossing, an at-grade crossing where two primary rail routes serving Southern California intersected. Prior to the completion of the flyover project, the crossing was responsible for significant congestion on the main lines of the Union Pacific (UP) and BNSF railroads, with over 110 trains using the right-angle crossing on a daily basis.

In December 2006, the Alameda Corridor Transit Authority (ACTA) presented a feasibility study to analyze alternatives and costs for design and construction of an east–west structure, which would grade separate the BNSF and UP main line tracks at Colton Crossing. In addition, ACTA prepared a report on a proposed north–south flyover to the south of Colton Crossing to reduce train crossing conflicts and hours-long congestion. The report was evaluated by ACTA, UP, BNSF and the San Bernardino Associated Governments (SANBAG). SANBAG conducted community outreach meetings to assist the project team with selecting the final build option. In November 2011, work began on the grade separation project, with the final design being a 2.2-km east–west flyover of the Union Pacific tracks over the north-south BNSF tracks. Work was initially expected to take four years at a projected cost of $202 million. Skanska was the lead contractor on this project.

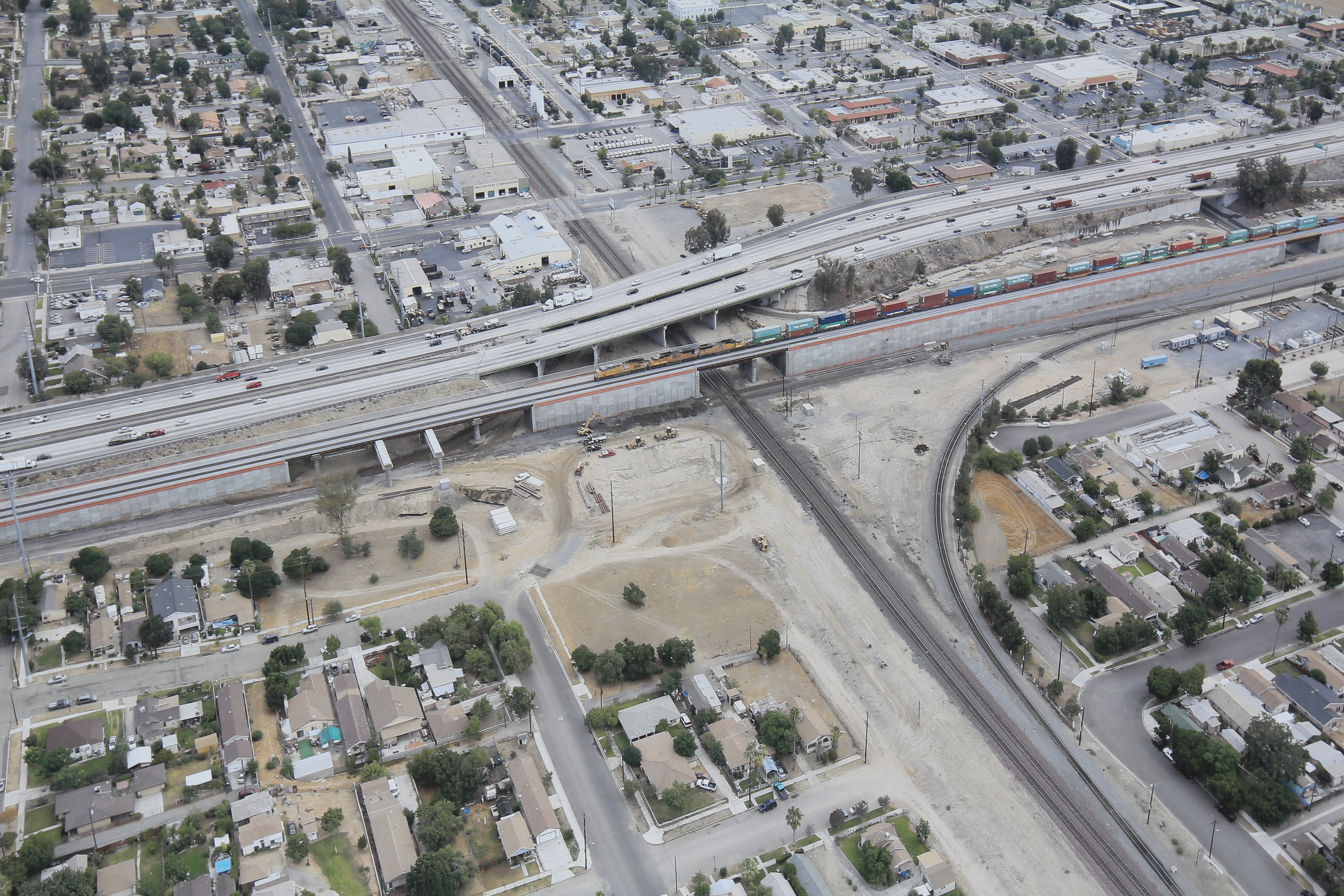
An aerial view of the grade separation. Interstate 10 is visible, running parallel to the flyover immediately to the north.

The Colton Crossing flyover project was completed in August 2013, with BNSF and UP each getting two tracks for their traffic. As seen from the image, a singular UP track was kept at grade to be used for emergencies, switching, and access to the West Colton yard (effectively keeping the last Colton Diamond intact). Innovative construction methods, including cellular embankments and low bid prices, were likely responsible for the project coming in eight months ahead of schedule and significantly under budget, with the final cost being $93 million versus the budgeted $202 million. The completion of the project has resulted in greatly reduced congestion, leading to reduced travel times, a 31,000-ton drop in annual greenhouse gas emissions, and $241 million saved in time spent traveling.

== See also ==
- Stockton Diamond
