= Victor Valley Transportation Center =

Intermodal transit center in Victorville, California

Victorville, CA
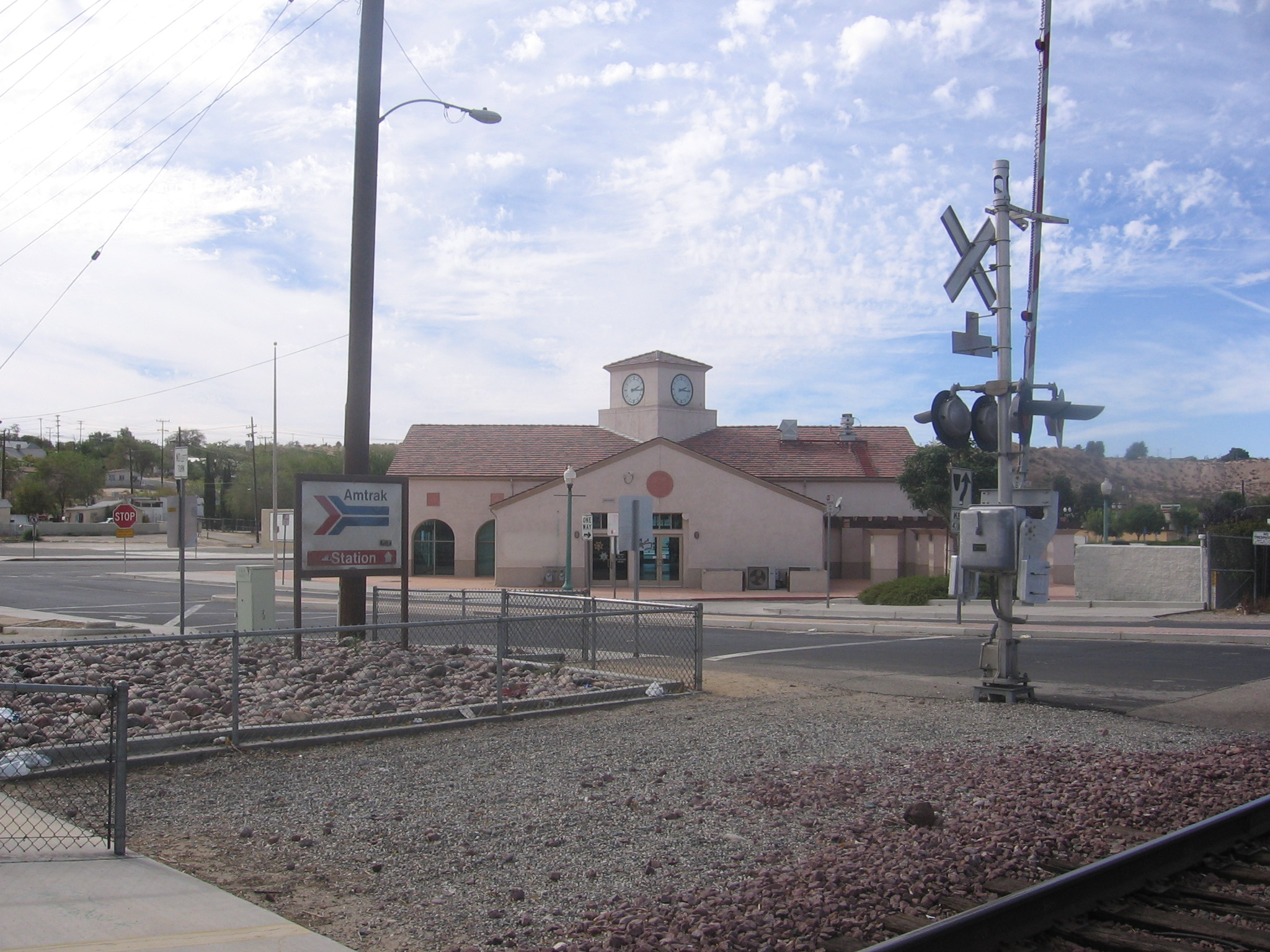
- The Victor Valley Transportation Center in 2012

General information
- Other names: Victor Valley Transportation Center
- Location: 16838/16858 D Street; Victorville, California; United States
- Coordinates: 34°32′15″N 117°17′36″W
- Owner: City of Victorville
- Line: BNSF Cajon Subdivision
- Platforms: 1 side and 1 island platform
- Tracks: 3
- Bus stands: 8
- Bus operators: Greyhound Lines; Victor Valley Transit: 15, 22, 31, 32, 41, 50, 52, 55, 56, 114, 118

Construction
- Accessible: Yes

Other information
- Station code: Amtrak: VRV

History
- Opened: October 28, 1990 (Amtrak)

Passengers
- FY 2025: 7,228 (Amtrak)

Services
Preceding station	Amtrak	Following station
San Bernardino toward Los Angeles	Southwest Chief	Barstow toward Chicago
Former services
Preceding station	Amtrak	Following station
San Bernardino toward Los Angeles	Desert Wind Discontinued in 1997	Barstow toward Chicago
Preceding station	Atchison, Topeka and Santa Fe Railway	Following station
Hesperia toward Los Angeles	Main Line	Oro Grande toward Chicago
Location

The Victor Valley Transportation Center (Victorville station) is an intermodal transit center in Victorville, California. It is served by the daily Amtrak Southwest Chief train, as well as Greyhound Lines intercity buses and Victor Valley Transit Authority local buses.

== History ==
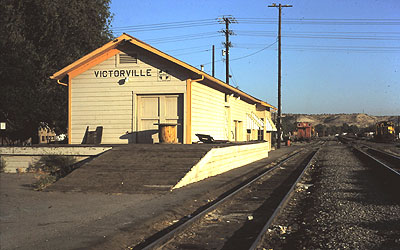
The former Victorville station in 1979

The California Southern Railroad, a subsidiary of the Atchison, Topeka and Santa Fe Railroad (Santa Fe), opened between Barstow and San Diego in 1885. In 1905, with the completion of the Los Angeles and Salt Lake Railroad, the Union Pacific Railroad (UP) began using trackage rights over the Santa Fe between Daggett and Riverside. Service to Victorville on the UP City of Los Angeles and Santa Fe Grand Canyon lasted until May 1, 1971, when Amtrak took over intercity passenger service. Amtrak only retained the Santa Fe Super Chief, which did not stop at Victorville. The Desert Wind, added in 1979, also passed through Victorville without stopping.

Planning for an Amtrak stop at Victorville began in June 1986, and construction began in July 1990. The stop opened with service by the daily Desert Wind on October 28, 1990. The Southwest Chief (successor of the Super Chief) began stopping at Victorville on October 30, 1994. The Desert Wind was discontinued on May 12, 1997, leaving only the Southwest Chief serving Victorville.

In February 1994, a county funding agency approved construction of a transit center with a park-and-ride lot, bus plaza, and waiting room. After delays, the $3.4 million Victory Valley Transportation Center opened on January 22, 2000. On August 1, 2021, the transit center became the primary hub for Victor Valley Transit local bus service. As of 2024, Amtrak plans to reconstruct the platform, parking area, and walkways for accessibility in FY 2024 to FY 2026.
