= Needles Area Transit =

Public transportation system of Needles, California, U.S.

- Parent: City of Needles
- Headquarters: 817 Third Street Needles, CA
- Service area: Colorado River
- Service type: bus service, paratransit
- Routes: 3
- Fleet: 7 buses
- Annual ridership: 29,257 passengers(FY 2024)
- Operator: RATP Dev
- Website: needlestransit.com

Needles Area Transit (NAT) is the public transportation system, including a Dial-a-Ride program for seniors and persons with disabilities, serving residents of the city of Needles in San Bernardino County, California. The NAT system transports approximately 34,000 riders each year.

Needles Area Transit has the smallest service area of transit system operators in San Bernardino County, at 31 square miles

== Route overview ==
Needles Area Transit provides deviated fixed route service on a single route within Needles. The service operates hourly, 7 a.m. to 7 p.m., Monday through Friday and for 4 hours on Saturday. NAT serves most of the area within the city, with the exception of some trailer parks on the north end of the city.

The single NAT route operates as two loops, starting and ending at the same stop on G Street and Broadway, near the city's Chamber of Commerce. At the start of each hour (nn:00), the bus departs on the West Loop, returning to G and Broadway at 25 minutes past the hour (nn:25). At the half hour (nn:30), the bus departs on the North-South Loop, returning to G and Broadway at 55 minutes past the hour (nn:55). Both loops service the city's major shopping center (Needles Towne Center), departing at 20 and 50 minutes past the hour on the return leg along Broadway to the route's origin/end point. Deviations from the fixed route are allowed, schedule permitting, if pre-arranged with the dispatcher.

In 2014, NAT offered a seasonal route with service to Jack Smith Park, which offers recreational access to the Colorado River. Riders were not allowed to carry rafts, but deflated river inflatables were allowed, as long as they were stowed in a bag.

In addition to the single NAT fixed route, the City of Needles operates the Needles Dial-a-Ride (aka Senior Shuttle), with curb-to-curb service for persons age 55 and over or persons with limited mobility, from 9 a.m. to 1 p.m. Monday through Friday; Dial-a-Ride Medical, open to the general public on a first-come, first-served basis, with trips to medical facilities in Bullhead City, Arizona on Tuesdays and Thursdays; and Shopper Shuttle Pilot to major retail stores in Fort Mohave, including Walmart and Safeway, on Wednesdays.

By 2025, the Bullhead Dial-a-Ride medical shuttle became a limited fixed lifeline route named Fort Mohave/Bullhead Shuttle with deviation service.

=== Fixed-Route ===
| Route | Terminals | Via | Weekday Service Hours | Saturday Service Hours |
|---|---|---|---|---|
| West | Needles G Street, Broadway | Broadway, Lillyhill Drive | 7:00 a.m. - 6:55 p.m. | 10:00 a.m. - 4:55 p.m. |
| North-South | Needles G Street, Broadway | Broadway | 7:00 a.m. - 6:55 p.m. | 10:00 a.m. - 4:55 p.m. |
| Fort Mohave/Bullhead Shuttle | El Garces Intermodal Transportation Facility | US 95 | | |

== Bus fleet ==
=== Fixed-Route ===
| Make/Model | Fleet numbers | Thumbnail | Year | Engine | Transmission | Notes |
|---|---|---|---|---|---|---|
| Ford E-450 | N-7 to N-8 | | 2012 | Ford Triton V8 5.4L | Ford TorqShift 5R110 5 speed | |
| Chevrolet G4500 | N-9 to N-10 | | 2018 | GM Vortec V6 4.3L | GM 4L80-E 4 speed automatic | |

== History ==
Public transportation within Needles started with a 1984 agreement between the city and the Needles Senior Citizens Club. The city entered in to a contract with the Club to provide specialized transportation services, becoming responsible for hiring and providing drivers, and for purchasing the paratransit vehicles. In 2016, McDonald Transit Associates took over operations for the Dial-a-Ride services.

NAT began operating in May 1995; the initial operator was Laidlaw. The operations contract subsequently was taken over by McDonald Transit Associates, the transit affiliate of RATP Dev, from 2006 to 2019. Transportation Concepts, the transit division of Parking Concepts, Inc., took over the operations contracts for NAT and Dial-a-Ride services starting in October 2019.

The NAT office and garage are in the west end of the historic El Garces Intermodal Transportation Facility, which connects with Amtrak. NAT uses two 18-passenger buses and the Dial-a-Ride service uses a single 9-passenger bus.

New shelters/benches were installed at bus stops in February 2019, and modern signs informed riders when buses are scheduled to arrive.

In 2019, NAT was seeking funding from SBCTA for a pilot program named Shopper Shuttle. It would have taken residents to Fort Mojave for their grocery needs, as the city lost its only grocery store. The Pilot program was going to start late 2019 and continue until 2023. The pilot program officially began in July 2021. In 2021, SBCTA recommended extending the Shopper Shuttle pilot into a limited stop fixed route, twice weekly service, to Bullhead City as a way to reduce cost on the transit system by combining the shopper shuttle with its separate dial-a-ride medical service.
