= San Bernardino Transit Center =

Transit center in San Bernardino, California, US

San Bernardino–Downtown
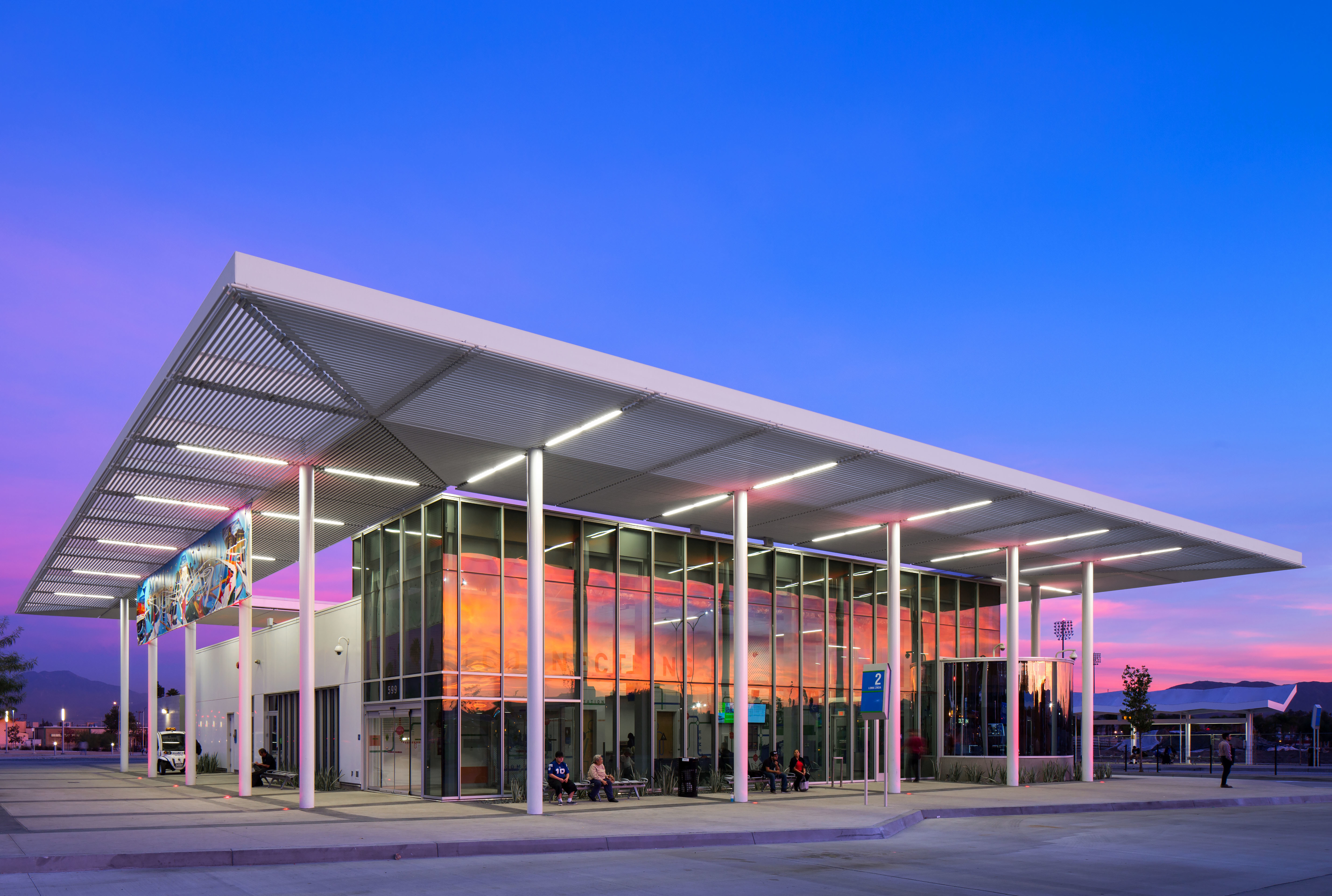
- San Bernardino Transit Center station building

General information
- Other names: San Bernardino Transit Center; Downtown San Bernardino
- Location: 599 West Rialto Avenue; San Bernardino, California
- Coordinates: 34°06′00″N 117°17′43″W
- Owner: Omnitrans
- Line: SCRRA San Gabriel Subdivision/Redlands Branch
- Platforms: 2 side platforms, 1 island platform
- Tracks: 4
- Train operators: Metrolink
- Bus stands: 22
- Bus operators: Omnitrans; Beaumont Transit; Mountain Transit; Riverside Transit Agency; SunLine Transit Agency; Victor Valley Transit Authority; Flixbus

Construction
- Structure type: At-grade
- Parking: 130 spaces, 14 accessible spaces
- Cycle facilities: Yes
- Accessible: Yes
- Architect: HDR, Inc.

History
- Opened: September 8, 2015; 10 years ago

Passengers
- FY 2026: 678 (avg. wkdy boardings)

Services
Preceding station	Metrolink	Following station
Terminus	Arrow	San Bernardino–Tippecanoe toward Redlands–University
San Bernardino–Depot toward Oceanside	Inland Empire–Orange County Line	Terminus
San Bernardino–Depot toward L.A. Union Station	San Bernardino Line	Terminus
San Bernardino–Depot toward L.A. Union Station	San Bernardino Line (limited weekday service)	Redlands–Downtown Terminus
Preceding station	Omnitrans	Following station
Civic Center toward Palm	Green Line	Inland Center toward VA Hospital
Track layout
Location

The San Bernardino Transit Center (Metrolink designation San Bernardino–Downtown station and also known as Downtown San Bernardino station) is an intermodal transit center in downtown San Bernardino, California, United States. It is owned and operated by Omnitrans, the area's public transportation agency. Opened in September 2015, the center consolidates three Metrolink commuter rail services and more than a dozen local bus services, including the sbX bus rapid transit service into one central location.

== History and development ==
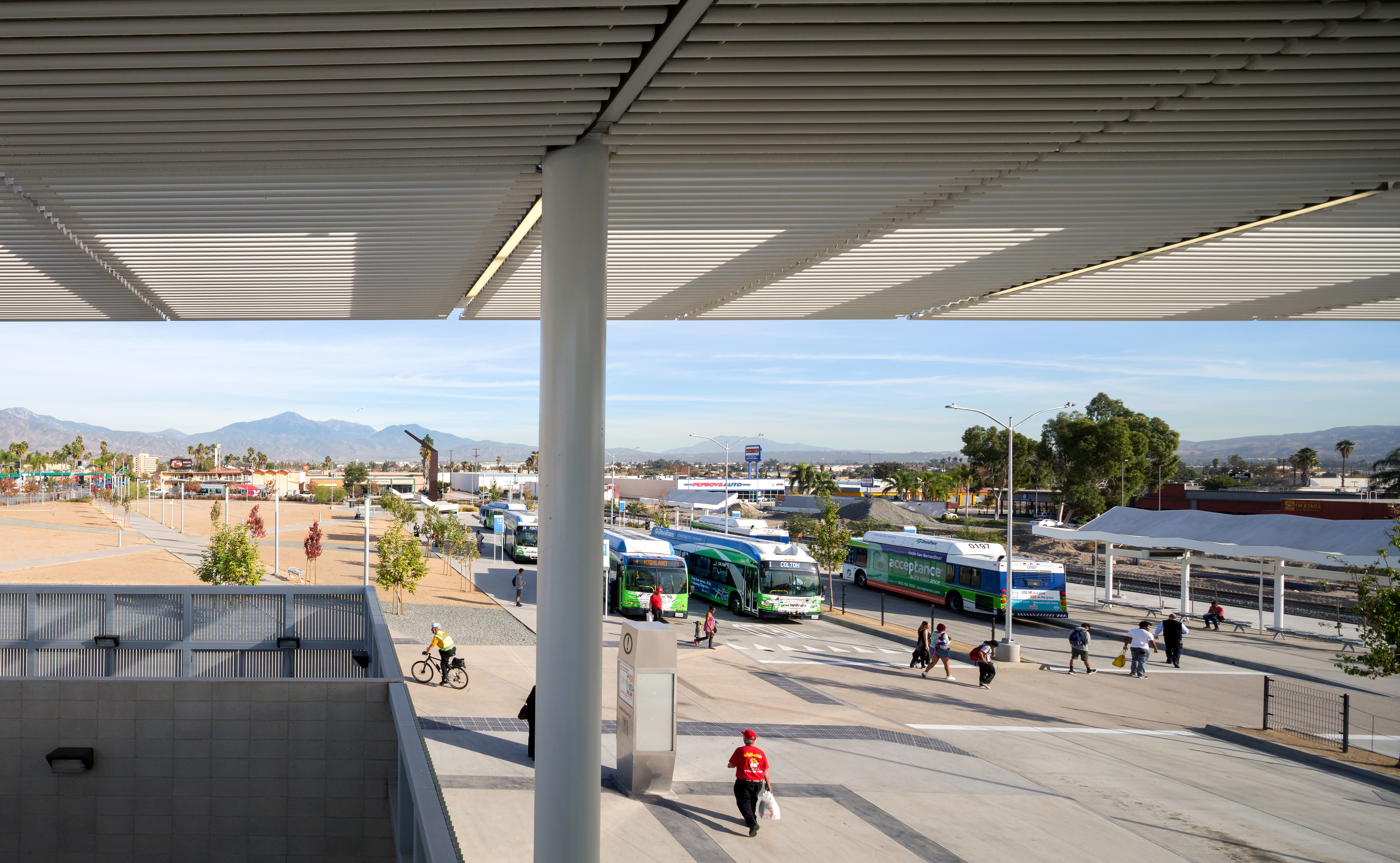
Omnitrans buses at the San Bernardino Transit Center

Pacific Electric (PE) and its local predecessors used the SBTC site as a tram shed in the early 1900s, and later Upland–San Bernardino Line trains terminated here. Omnitrans selected the site at the corner of West Rialto Avenue and South E Street to build a transit center in the 2000s, and purchased the land for the station from Union Pacific Railroad, the successor corporation to Pacific Electric, in 2008. In 2010, San Bernardino Associated Governments, the area regional planning organization had stepped-in to fund and coordinate the project and hired design firm HDR, Inc. to draw up plans for the transit center. The SBTC replaced the Fourth Street Transit Mall, an on-street bus transfer center a few blocks away near San Bernardino City Hall.

Construction of the center began in 2014, with a groundbreaking held on February 25. The sbX line and its adjacent station on E Street opened on April 28, 2014.

The transit center was complete by August 24, 2015, when a celebration was held at the site, but it didn't open for service until September 8, 2015, coinciding with a major service change for Omnitrans, which saw more than a dozen bus lines rerouted to serve the transit center.

Train service came to the station in late 2017 after the completion of a project that built tracks between the transit center and San Bernardino's Santa Fe Depot, which was the city's primary train depot. Test runs of the train service to downtown with paying passengers began on December 16, 2017, with the service officially being declared open on December 18.

Arrow, a commuter rail service, opened on October 24, 2022, with its western terminus at the transit center. At the same time, the daily express trip on Metrolink's San Bernardino Line was extended to Redlands–Downtown station. Express trains pass through the transit center without stopping. The express train was subsequently converted into a local stop train on January 27, 2025, although the train continues to Redlands-Downtown without intermediate stops from San Bernardino Transit Center.

The California High-Speed Rail Authority is considering the station as a possible stop on the second phase of the California High-Speed Rail project.

== Services and facilities ==
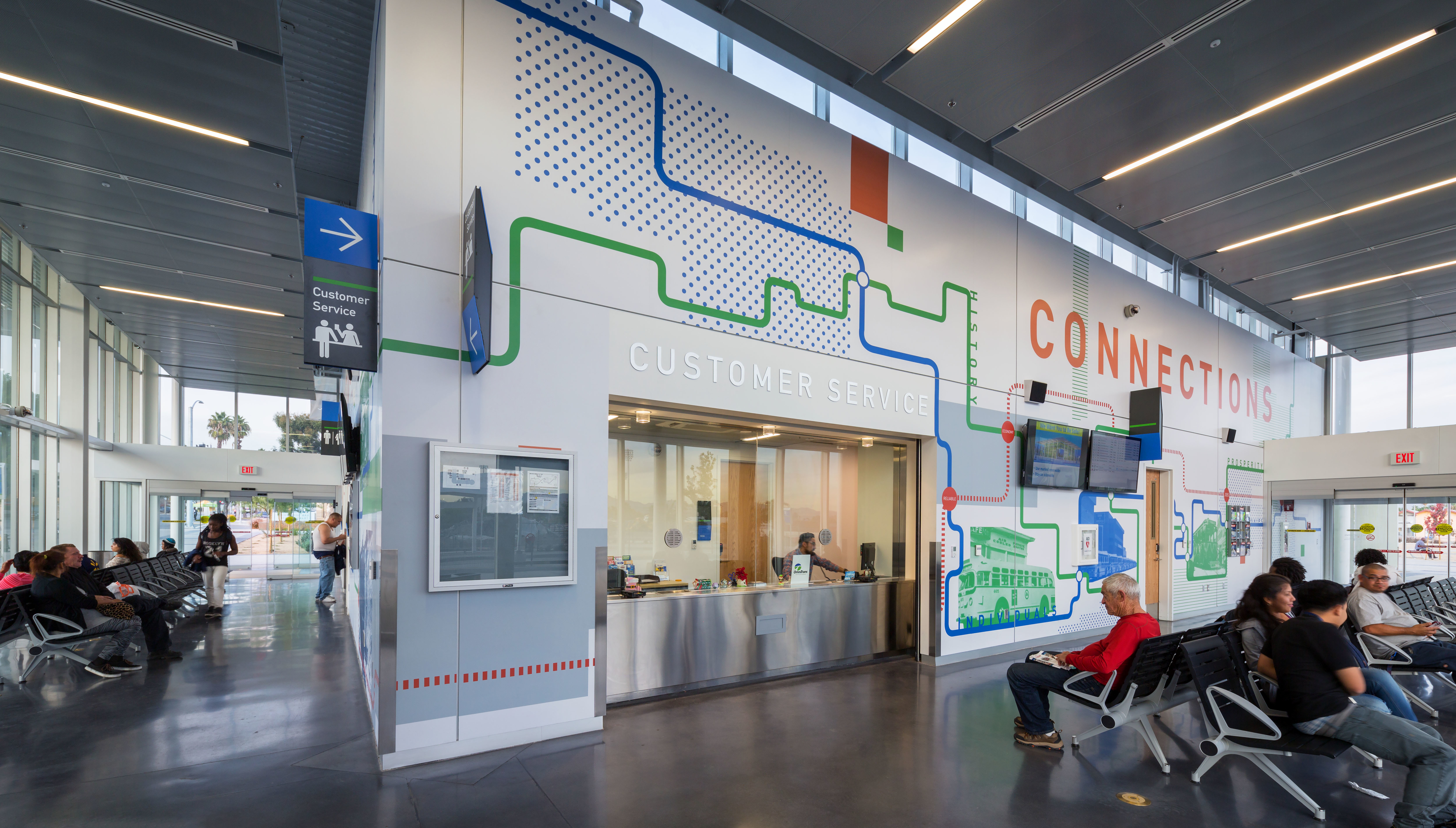
Interior of San Bernardino Transit Center station building with customer service office and waiting room

The center contains a LEED Gold station building with public facilities, waiting areas, and solar panels on its roof. A mural titled Explorations is on the exterior of the station building, and a large sundial is at the center of the bus area.

The central bus plaza has 19 bus bays, with two additional bus bays located along West Rialto Avenue which runs along the northern edge of the transit center, and the sbX bus rapid transit platform in the median of South E Street which runs along the eastern edge of the transit center.

=== Rail services ===
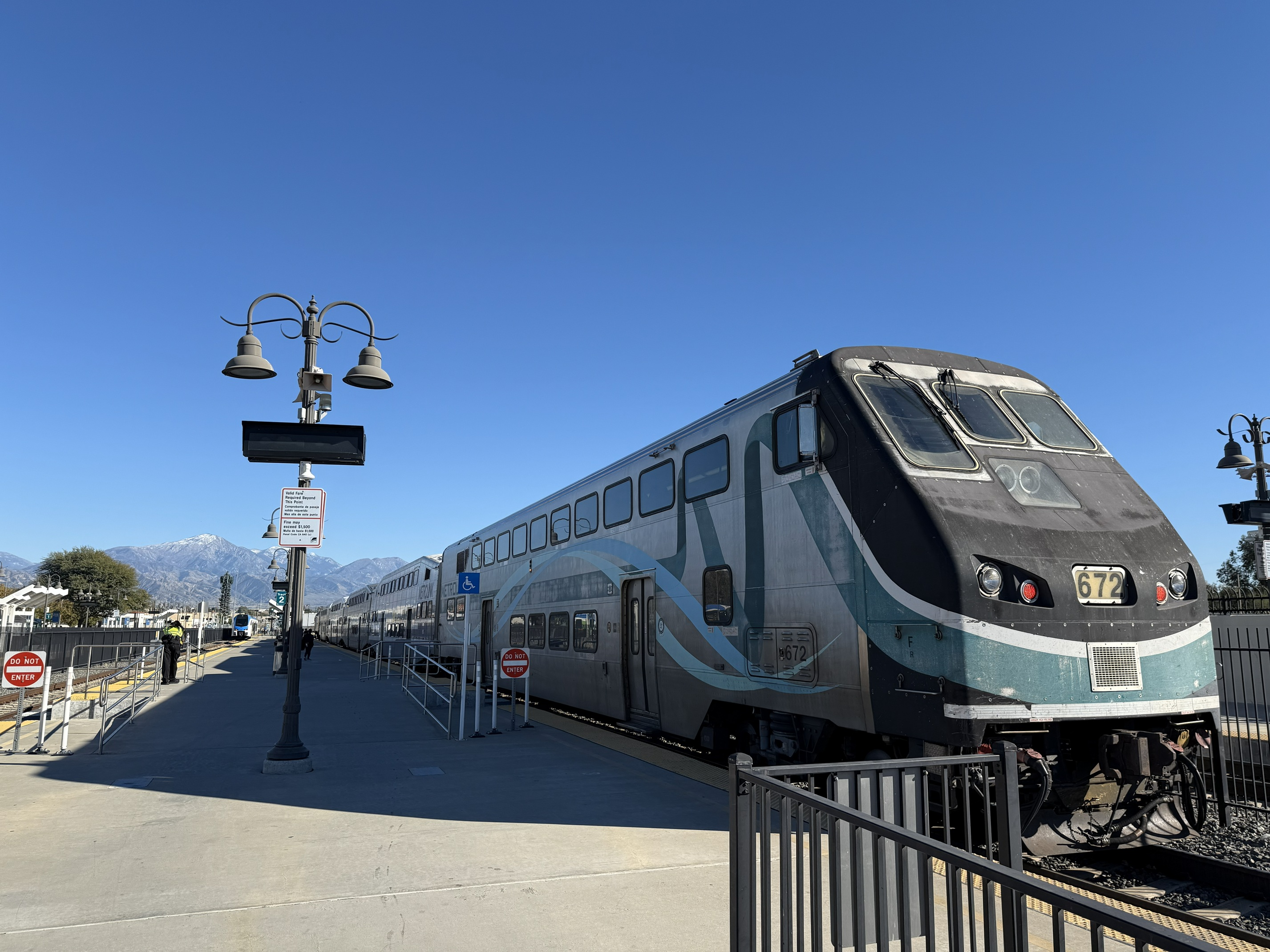
Metrolink San Bernardino line and Arrow trains next to the island platform in 2025

A total of four train tracks are located along the southern edge of the transit center, served by two side platforms and one island platform. The Arrow service uses the two tracks closest to the central bus plaza, which continue across South E Street to Redlands. Metrolink trains use all four tracks, including the two southernmost stub-end tracks, where trains can be stored for extended periods of time without blocking the main line.

San Bernardino Transit Center is served by 32 Metrolink San Bernardino Line trains (16 in each direction) each weekday, with trains arriving approximately every 60 minutes between 3:41 a.m. and 11:24 p.m. Weekend service consists of 16 trains (8 in each direction) on both Saturday and Sunday, evenly spaced throughout the day.

Additionally, the station is served by 8 Metrolink Inland Empire–Orange County Line trains (4 in each direction) each weekday, running primarily at peak hours in the peak direction of travel. Weekend service consists of 4 trains (2 in each direction) on both Saturday and Sunday, heading towards Orange County in the morning and towards the Inland Empire in the evening.

Arrow trains operate daily. On weekdays, service runs between approximately 4 am and 11 pm, with 30-minute frequencies during the early morning and evening peak periods and hourly service at other times. On weekends, trains operate between about 7:30 pm and 10 pm at hourly intervals, with three 1-hour gaps in service in the morning, afternoon, and evening.

=== Bus services ===
As of August 8, 2022 the following transit bus routes serve the San Bernardino Transit Center:

- Omnitrans: 1, 2, 3, 4, 6, 8, 10, 14, 15, 215, 290, 300 (SB Connect), 305 (OmniAccess)
- Beaumont Transit: Commuter Link 120
- Mountain Transit: 5, 6
- Riverside Transit Agency: Commuter Link 200
- SunLine Transit Agency: 10 Commuter Link
- Victor Valley Transit Authority: 15

The station is also served by the intercity bus company FlixBus which operates routes to Las Vegas, Phoenix-Tempe, San Diego, and Ventura from the transit center.
