= Barstow Harvey House =

Train station in Barstow, California, U.S.

Barstow, CA
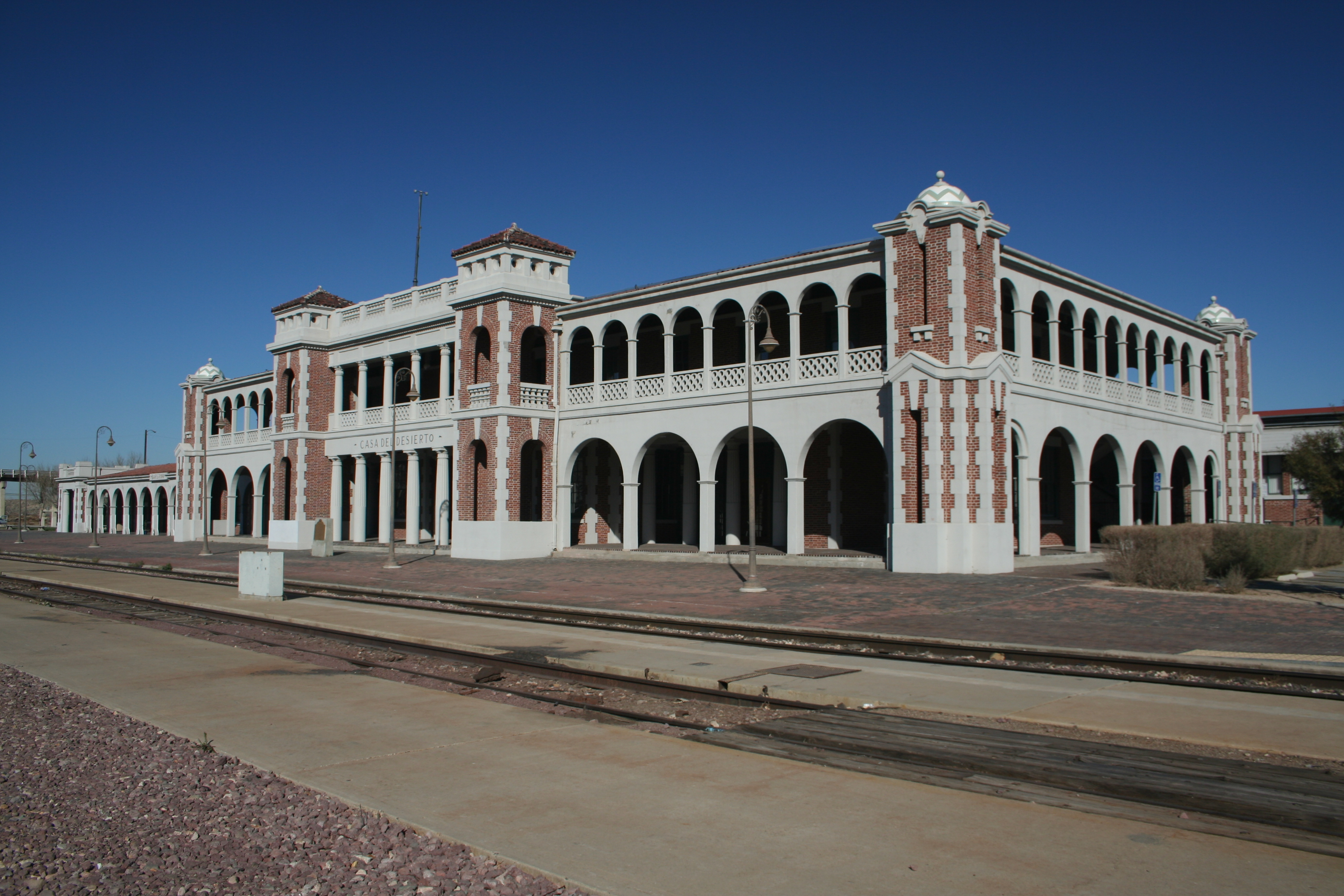
- The depot in 2006

General information
- Other names: Barstow Harvey House; Harvey House Rail Depot
- Location: 685 North 1st Avenue; Barstow, California; United States
- Coordinates: 34°54′17″N 117°01′29″W
- Owner: City of Barstow/BNSF
- Line: BNSF Southern Transcon
- Platforms: 1 side platform (others out of service)
- Tracks: Only 1 passing siding and 1 through track remaining
- Connections: Amtrak Thruway: 10

Construction
- Parking: Yes
- Accessible: Yes

Other information
- Station code: Amtrak: BAR

History
- Opened: February 22, 1911

Passengers
- FY 2025: 3,300 (Amtrak)

Services
Preceding station	Amtrak	Following station
Victorville toward Los Angeles	Southwest Chief	Needles toward Chicago
Former services
Preceding station	Amtrak	Following station
Victorville toward Los Angeles	Desert Wind 1979–1997	Las Vegas toward Chicago
San Bernardino toward Los Angeles	Las Vegas Limited 1976	Las Vegas Terminus
Preceding station	Atchison, Topeka and Santa Fe Railway	Following station
Lenwood toward Los Angeles	Main Line	Daggett toward Chicago
Hinkley Trackage rights via Southern Pacific Railroad toward Richmond	Valley Division	Terminus
- Harvey House Railroad Depot
- U.S. National Register of Historic Places
- California Historical Landmark
- Area: 1.1 acres (0.4 ha)
- Architect: Francis W. Wilson
- Architectural style: Santa Fe
- NRHP reference No.: 75000458
- CHISL No.: 892

Significant dates
- Added to NRHP: April 3, 1975
- Designated CHISL: 1976
Location

The Barstow Harvey House, also known as Harvey House Railroad Depot and Barstow station, is a historic building in Barstow, California. Originally built in 1911 as Casa del Desierto, a Harvey House hotel and Santa Fe Railroad depot, it currently serves as an Amtrak station and government building housing city offices, the Barstow Chamber of Commerce and Visitor Center, and two museums.

== History and architecture ==
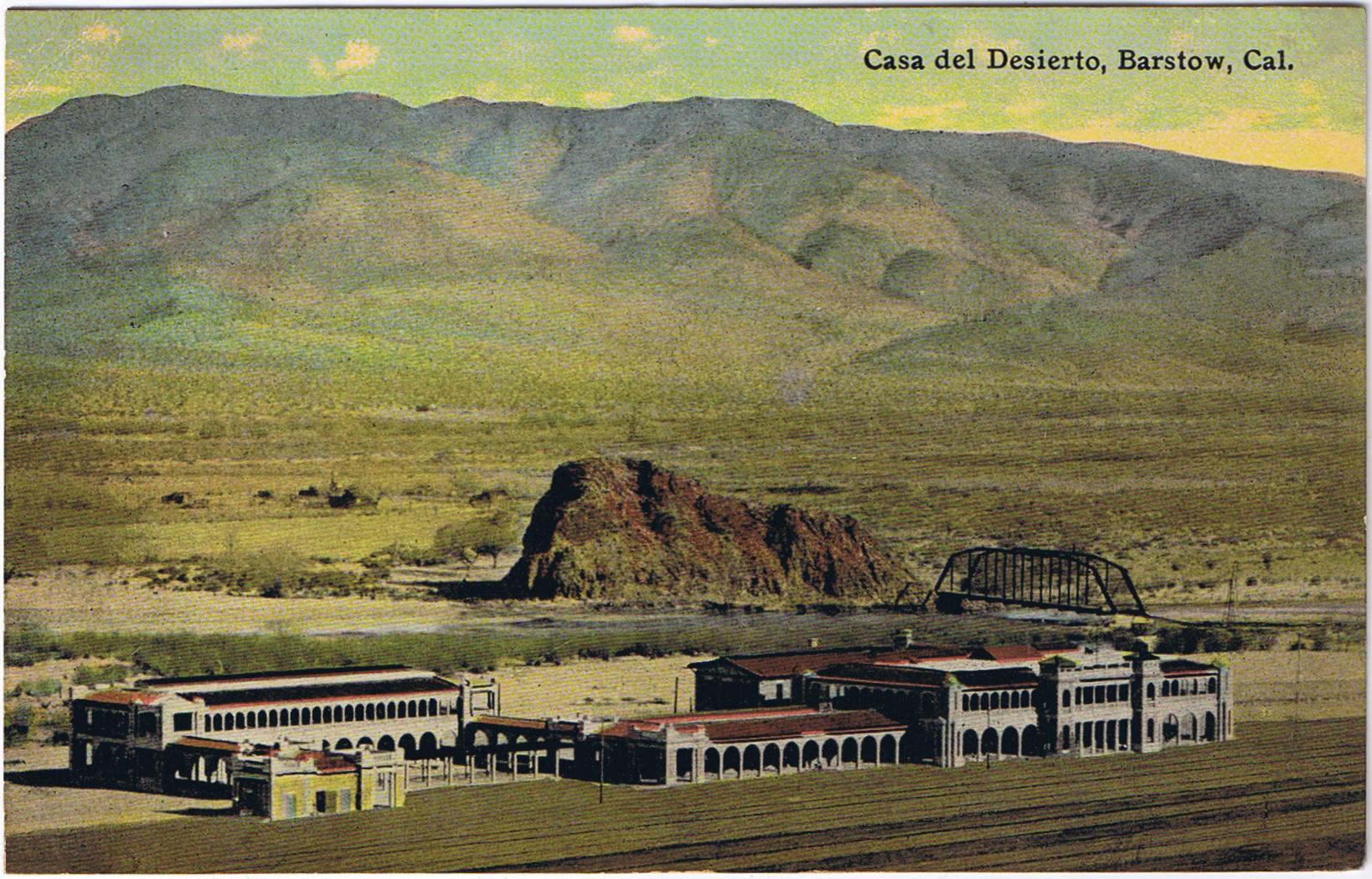
Casa del Desierto shortly after construction

The Casa del Desierto station and hotel was built in 1911 by the Atchison, Topeka and Santa Fe Railway to replace an earlier one built in 1885 that burned in 1908.

The building is a synthesis of Spanish Renaissance and Classical Revival architecture styles, with a Moorish feeling as well. The concrete frame is faced with red tapestry brick and beige artificial stone. Majestic arcades and colonnades line the facade, providing shade from the desert sun. Red clay barrel tiles are used to cover the roof. Towers at the building's corners, and those of the central projecting bay facing the tracks, are capped with pointed roofs or painted domes.

Francis W. Wilson is the architect credited by the Historic American Buildings Survey of the National Park Service. Amtrak's Great American Stations site says that "according to contemporary accounts, the Casa del Desierto ... was designed by Francis W. Wilson of Santa Barbara, Calif." Earlier Wilson had designed the Fray Marcos hotel in Williams, Arizona, and El Garces in Needles for the Santa Fe and Fred Harvey.

The historic structure is the finest remaining depot-hotel in California, an elegant presence in the Mojave Desert beside the intermittent Mojave River. In the 1950s, the Barstow Harvey House was listed in the Green Book guide of business establishments that were friendly to African-American motorists.

The Santa Fe closed the station in 1973. Casa del Desierto was added to the National Register of Historic Places in 1975, and designated as a California Historical Landmark in 1976. It became derelict until bought in 1990 by the City of Barstow, then restored and repaired for more than $8 million following heavy damage in a 1992 earthquake.

After completion of the repairs, several city offices moved into the building. The Barstow Area Chamber of Commerce & Visitor Center also operates out of the former Harvey House. Other public institutions located here are the Western America Railroad Museum on the east side and the Route 66 "Mother Road" Museum on the north side.

As of 2024, Amtrak plans to modify the platform for accessibility by FY 2026.

== See also ==
- Fred Harvey (entrepreneur)
- Kelso Depot – Visitors Center
- El Garces Hotel – Needles, California
- California Historical Landmarks in San Bernardino County, California
