= Victor Valley Transit Authority =

Transit agency in San Bernardino County, California, US

Victor Valley Transit

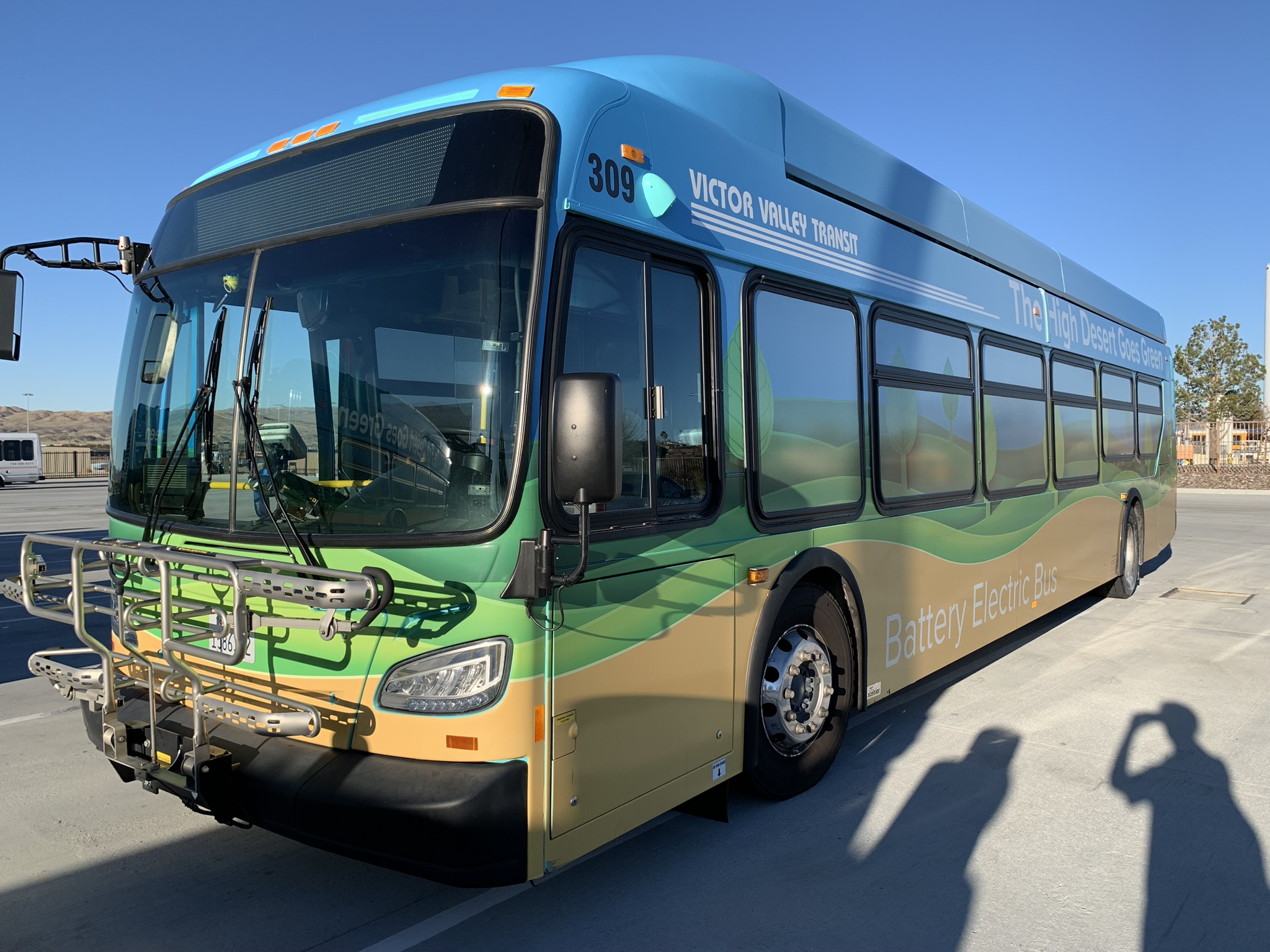
- New Flyer Xcelsior XE at Barstow in 2024
- Parent: Victor Valley Transit Authority
- Founded: 1993
- Headquarters: 17150 Smoke Tree St. Hesperia, California
- Service area: Victor Valley
- Service type: Fixed Route, Commuter, Paratransit, Microtransit
- Routes: 34 (30 local and 4 commuter)
- Hubs: 2 maintenance facilities (Hesperia & Barstow)
- Fleet: 121 revenue vehicles
- Annual ridership: 1,831,200 (2025)
- Fuel type: CNG, Gas, Battery Electric
- Operator: Keolis
- Chief executive: Nancie Goff
- Website: vvta.org

Victor Valley Transit Authority (VVTA), the second largest transit operator in San Bernardino County (with over 1,020,119 passengers a year), is a transit agency providing bus service in the Victor Valley, California area. In 2025, the system had a ridership of 1,831,200.

In June 2015, VVTA was designated as a Consolidated Transportation Services Agency (CTSA) for the High & North Desert regions of San Bernardino County. This represented an expanding role and commitment to the Authority's already established Mobility Management department and increased the VVTA service area from 425 to 950 square miles.

== History ==
=== Origins of the VVTA ===
VVTA operates local fixed-route, county commuter (discontinued in 2005), and ADA complementary paratransit bus services in the Victor Valley area. It has a maintenance facility located in Hesperia. The service structure consists of 23 local fixed and deviated routes, 3 County routes and ADA complementary paratransit service. VVTA was established through a Joint Powers Authority in 1991. The JPA includes the four cities of Adelanto, Apple Valley, Hesperia and Victorville and certain unincorporated portions of the County of San Bernardino including Oro Grande, Helendale, Lucerne Valley, Phelan, Piñon Hills, Wrightwood. Service is also provided to Barstow and Fort Irwin. The Fort Irwin service is branded as the NTC Commuter. The Board of Directors includes council members from the above cities and the San Bernardino 1st District Supervisor. Since 1998, the Board has held a management contract with McDonald Transit Associates, Inc. for administration of the system. In January 2005, the operations contract for all transit service in the Victor Valley area was consolidated under a separate contract with ATC (later Veoila, now Transdev). In 2018, National Express Transit became the system operator. Keolis Transit America (KTA), a subsidiary of Keolis North America, began operating the network Oct. 1, 2020.

=== Barstow Area Transit ===
Barstow Area Transit formerly ran the transportation service in Barstow and surrounding areas of San Bernardino County, including the communities of Hinkley, Lenwood, Grandview, Yermo, Harvard, Daggett and Newberry Springs. It was merged into VVTA in 2015.

MV Transportation, Inc. was contracted by the city to operate Barstow Area Transit. Barstow Area Transit operated Monday through Friday from 6:00 a.m. to 11:30 p.m. and on the weekends from 9:00 a.m. to 11:30 p.m; the system carried more than 144,000 passengers each year.

The system featured three routes: Central Barstow, which was called Route 1 while running as a clockwise loop and Route 2 while running counterclockwise; West Barstow/Grandview/Lenwood, which was called Route 3 while running clockwise and Route 4 while running counterclockwise; and Hwy 58 which traveled crosstown as Route 5.

In 2015, Victor Valley Transit Authority officially voted to take over Barstow Area Transit due to the potential savings of $403,663 and an increase of service levels in Barstow due to economies of scale.

=== Transition to Fuel Cell Buses ===
In May 2023, the board of directors voted to replace its Battery Electric buses in favor of Hydrogen Fuel Cell Buses due to not meeting range requirements. Current plans are for eleven fuel cell buses

== Governance ==
Victor Valley Transit Authority is administered by a Board of Directors, consisting of Seven Members (each with an alternate). The five board members from the cities are elected council persons assigned to VVTA by their respective city councils. The two board members are the San Bernardino county Supervisors (generally a staff person or the supervisor represents the county as the alternate). The Board is required under the JPA Memorandum of Understanding (MOU) to meet at least one time each quarter of each fiscal year. Board meetings are generally monthly in Hesperia, with every third meeting in Barstow. All meetings are held in compliance with the Ralph M. Brown Act. Board meetings are presided by the Board-appointed Chair. The board of directors is responsible for such acts as adopting the budget, approving route and schedule changes, public hearings as required, appointing the CEO/General Manager, appointing a technical advisory committee, establishing policy, and adopting rules and regulations for the conduct of business. The VVTA Technical Advisory (TAC) committee is the working group for the VVTA Board. It is composed of a staff member from each of the cities and County who is generally appointed by the City Manager, County Supervisor. The TAC takes direction from the Board to make recommendations on policy issues. In addition, TAC reviews monthly all suggested Board agenda items and decides on what actions to recommend to the Board for approval.

=== Transit Security ===
In 2023, VVTA, contracted with the San Bernardino County Sheriff's Department for transit security

== Routes ==
VVTA routes include Fixed, County, Intercity, and Commuter. County routes and some Fixed Routes can deviate as far as 3/4 mile to pick up passengers. County routes serve outlying rural areas. In August 2021, all routes at Lorene and 7th were moved to the Victor Valley Transportation Center (VVTC). On Sunday, October 2, 2022 VVTA returned to full-service.

Routes 1-9 are Barstow routes; 10-19 are Intercity routes; 20-29 are County routes; 30-39 are Routes primarily in Adelanto; 40-49 are Apple Valley, 50-59 are Victorville, 60-69 are Hesperia, and 100 series are the NTC Commuter. All routes operate 7 days a week. NTC Commuter Routes 111-118 operate Weekdays only..

Sunday, October 6, 2024, route restructuring and schedule changes. Barstow service hours expanded to be the same as Hesperia's service hours. Routes 25, 50X, and 54 discontinued. New Routes 27 and 49. Route 55 increased weekday frequency to 30 minute service. Routes 27, 28, and 29 frequency increased from 3 hours to 2 hours. Routes 40, 47, 54, and 66 Sunday frequency increased from every two hours to hourly. Route 66 Weekday and Saturday frequency increased from every two hours to hourly.

Free rides on all Fixed Routes (1-6, 31-68) and County Routes (20-29) from Sunday, October 5, 2024 to Saturday, October 12, 2024.

Route	Terminals		Via	Notes
1	Barstow Barstow City Hall	Barstow Armory + Chateau	Main St / Montara Rd	
2	Barstow Barstow City Hall	Barstow Barstow Community College	Barstow Rd	
3	Barstow Barstow City Hall	Barstow Lenwood Rd + Hampton Inn	Main St, Lenwood Rd	
6	Barstow Barstow City Hall	Barstow Rimrock Rd + N St	Armory Rd	
15	Barstow Barstow City Hall	San Bernardino San Bernardino Transit Center	I-10, I-15	via Victor Valley Transportation Center
20	Hesperia Main St + Cataba Rd	Pinon Hills Pinon Hills Community Center	Bear Valley Rd / Baldy Mesa	Previously Route 21P
21	Hesperia Main St + Cataba Rd	Wrightwood Wrightwood Community Center	Main St / Phelan Rd	Previously Route 21W
22	Victorville Victor Valley Transportation Center	Silver Lakes Vista Rd + Helendale Rd	National Trails Hwy	
23	Apple Valley Apple Valley Post Office	Lucerne Valley Lucerne Valley Market	Highway 18	
27	Barstow Barstow City Hall	Hinkley Outer Hwy 58 EB + Hidden River	Highway 58 / Community Blvd	New Route, previously served by Route 28
28	Barstow Barstow City Hall	Helendale Vista Rd + Helendale Rd	National Trails Hwy	
29	Barstow Barstow City Hall	Newberry Springs National Trails Hwy + I-40	Yermo Rd	
31	Victorville Victor Valley Transportation Center	Adelanto Hwy 395 + Crossroads Way	7th St / Palmdale Rd	
32	Victorville Victor Valley Transportation Center	Adelanto Muskrat Ave + El Mirage Rd	Air Expressway	
33	Adelanto Bartlett Ave + Greening St	Adelanto Hwy 395 + Crossroads Way	Bellflower St	
40	Apple Valley Apple Valley Post Office	Apple Valley Hwy 18 + Bass Hill Rd	Thunderbird Rd	
41	Apple Valley Apple Valley Post Office	Victorville Victor Valley Transportation Center	Outer Hwy 18	
42	Victorville Victor Valley College	Apple Valley Navajo Rd + Johnson Rd	Apple Valley Rd	
43	Victorville Victor Valley College	Apple Valley Apple Valley Post Office	Bear Valley Rd	
47	Apple Valley Apple Valley Post Office	Apple Valley Bear Valley Rd + Navajo Rd	Kiowa Rd / Pahute Rd	
49	Apple Valley Victor Valley Post Office	Victorville Victor Valley Mall	Yucca Loma Rd	New Route, first direct route between Apple Valley Post Office and Victor Valley Mall.
50	Victorville Victor Valley Transportation Center	Victorville Hesperia Post Office	I Ave / Hesperia Rd	
52	Victorville Victor Valley Transportation Center	Victorville Victor Valley Mall	El Evado Rd	
53	Victorville Victor Valley Mall	Victorville VictorvValley College	Bear Valley Rd	
55	Victorville Victor Valley Transportation Center	Victorville Victor Valley College	Ridgecrest Rd / Hesperia Rd	
56	Victorville Victor Valley Transportation Center	Victorville Lorene Dr + 7th St	Seneca Rd / Amargosa Rd	
64	Hesperia Hesperia Post Office	Hesperia Main St + Cataba Rd	3rd Ave / Willow St	via Escondido
66 (Loop)	Hesperia Hesperia Post Office		C Ave	
68	Hesperia Hesperia Post Office	Hesperia Main St + Cataba Rd	Main St	Westbound via Victor Valley Mall
111	Fort Irwin Fort Irwin Bus Lot	Barstow Wiliams Park & Ride	Irwin Rd	AM Northbound to Fort Irwin, PM Southbound to Barstow
114	Fort Irwin Fort Irwin Bus Lot	Hesperia Smoke Tree St - VVTA	15 Freeway	AM Northbound to Fort Irwin, PM Southbound to Hesperia
115	Fort Irwin Fort Irwin Bus Lot	Silver Lakes Vista Rd + Helendale Rd	National Trails Hwy	AM Northbound to Fort Irwin, PM Southbound to Helendale
118	Fort Irwin Fort Irwin Bus Lot		Irwin Rd / 15 Freeway	PM Southbound to Hesperia via Barstow

=== Micro-Link ===
On Monday, October 3, 2022, Micro-Link was introduced in three zones - Zone 1 Victorville, and Zone 2 Hesperia. Beginning October 28, 2024, Zone 3 North Apple Valley.

=== Needles Cactus Commuter ===
Needles Cactus Commuter is a mileage reimbursement model for the residents of Needles as an alternative to the former route 200 in order to reach the Courthouses in Victorville

== Bus fleet ==
=== Active fleet ===
Make/Model	Fleet numbers	Thumbnail	Year	Engine	Transmission	Notes
New Flyer XE40	301-307		2019	Siemens ELFA2	XALT Energy	
New Flyer XE40	308-312		2022	Siemens ELFA2	XALT Energy	Extended range
ENC Axess BRT 35' CNG	507-509		2022	Cummins Westport L9N	Allison B400R	
ENC Axess BRT 35' CNG	510		2023	Cummins Westport L9N	Allison B400R	
ENC Axess BRT 40' CNG	616		2013	Cummins Westport ISL G	Allison B400R	
ENC Axess BRT 40' CNG	617-624		2014	Cummins Westport ISL G	Allison B400R	
ENC Axess BRT 40' CNG	625		2015	Cummins Westport ISL G	Allison B400R	
ENC XHF 35' CNG	626-627		2016	Cummins Westport ISL G	Allison B400R	
ENC Axess BRT 35' CNG	628-629		2017	Cummins Westport ISL G NZ	Allison B3400 xFE	
ENC Axess BRT 40' CNG	630-636		2018	Cummins Westport L9N	Allison B3400 xFE	
ENC Axess BRT 35' CNG	637-638		2018	Cummins Westport L9N	Allison B3400 xFE	
ENC Axess BRT 40' CNG	639-643		2019	Cummins Westport L9N	Allison B3400 xFE	
ENC Axess BRT 40' CNG	644-645		2020	Cummins Westport L9N	Allison B400R	
ENC Axess BRT 40' CNG	646-647		2022	Cummins Westport L9N	Allison B400R	
ENC Axess BRT 40' CNG	648-650		2022	Cummins Westport L9N	Allison B400R	
ENC Axess BRT 40' CNG	651-655		2023	Cummins Westport L9N	Allison B400R	30th Anniversary wrap
MCI D4500CT CNG	812-816		2015	Cummins Westport ISL G	Allison B500R	Used on NTC Commuter
ENC Axess BRT Suburban 40' CNG	817-819		2016	Cummins Westport ISL G	Allison B400R	Used on Route 15
ENC E-Z Rider II BRT 32' CNG	2022-2027		2021	Cummins Westport L9N	Allison B400R	
ENC E-Z Rider II BRT 32' CNG	2028-2031		2022	Cummins Westport L9N	Allison B400R	
Ford E450/ElDorado 240	155-209		2011-2019			Direct Access
Dodge Lonestar ProMaster 3500	1011-1013, 1024		2020-2024			Micro-Link
