= Inland Empire =

Metropolitan area in California, United States

Inland Empire Riverside–San Bernardino–Ontario metropolitan area
- Metropolitan area
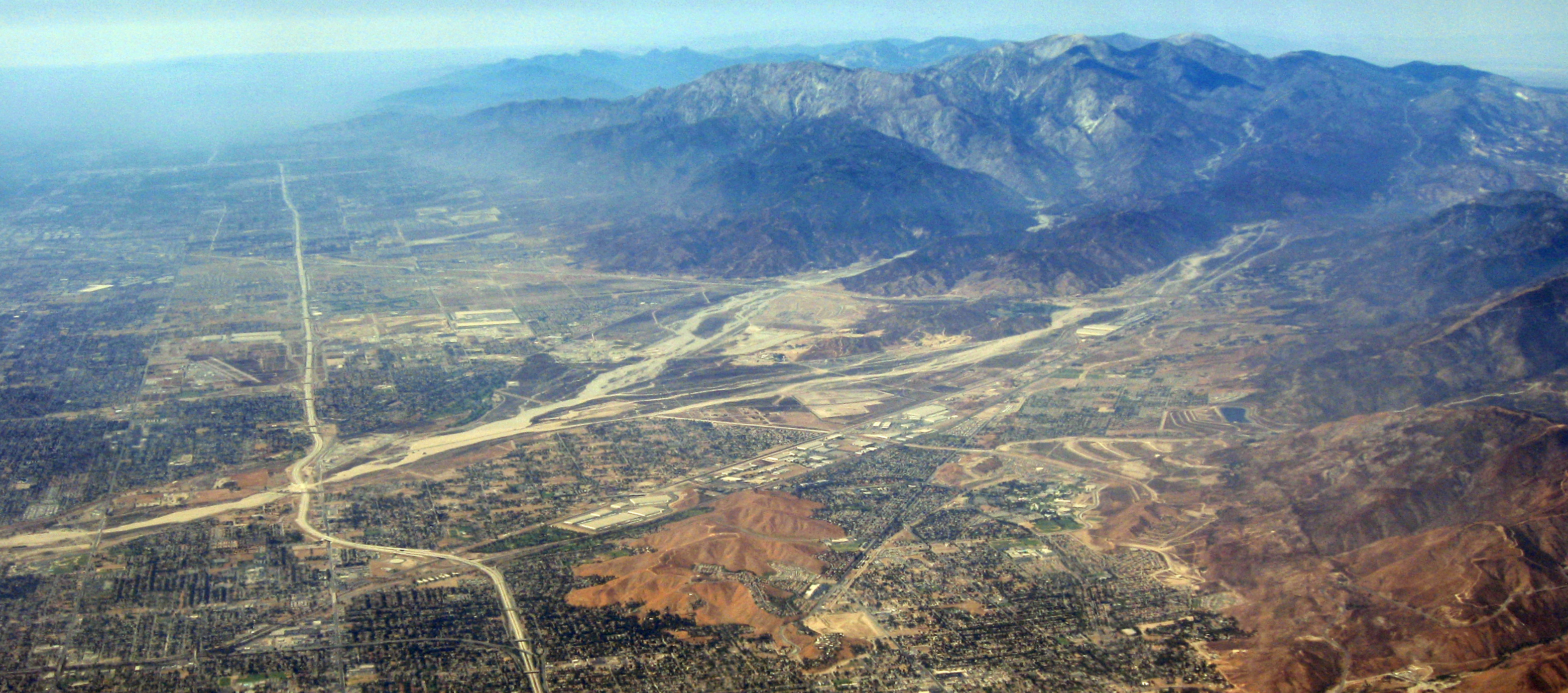
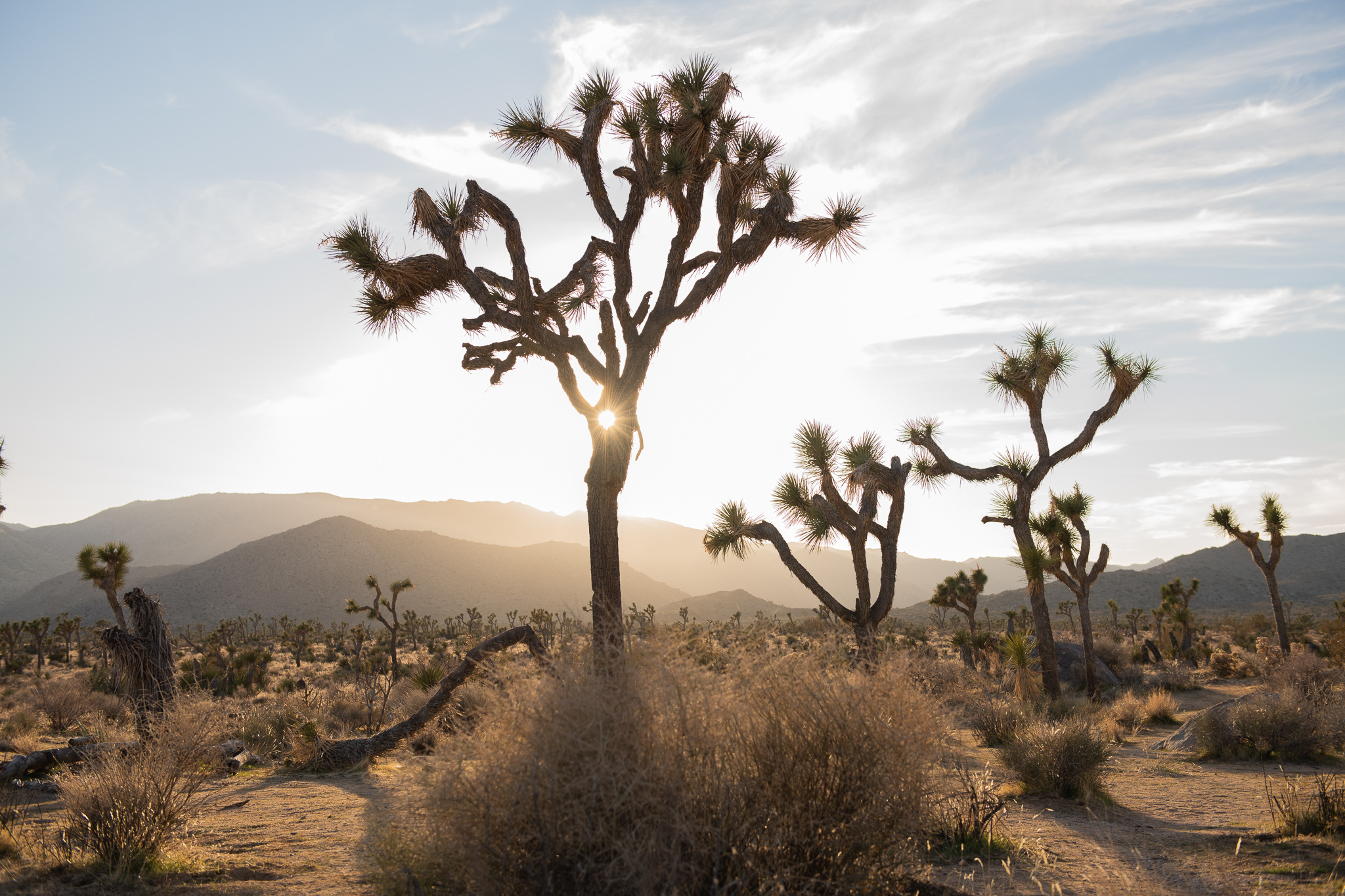
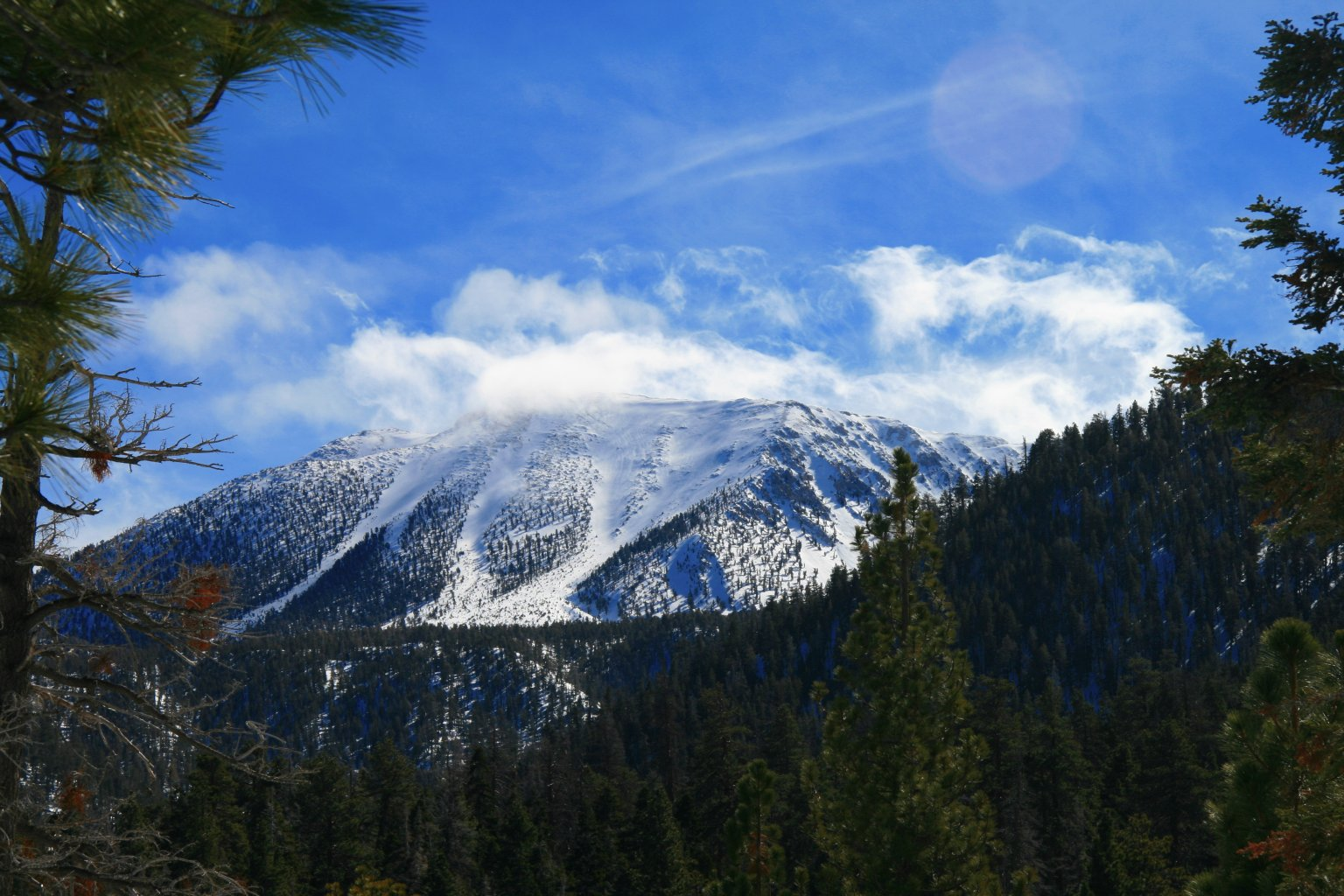
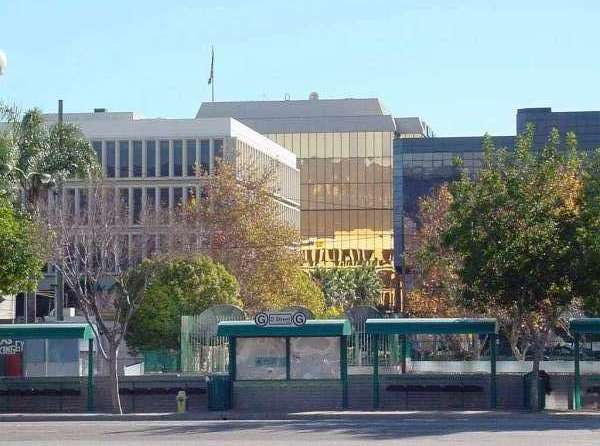
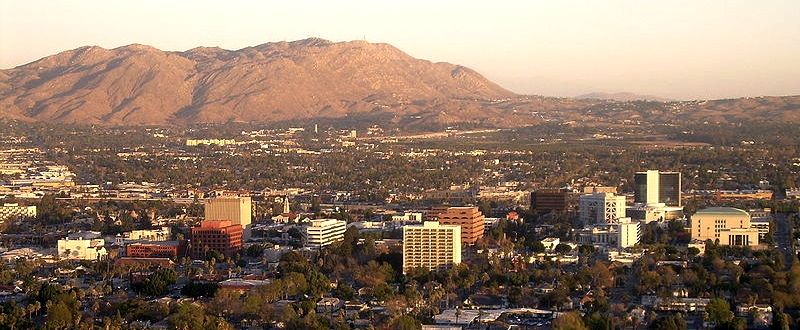
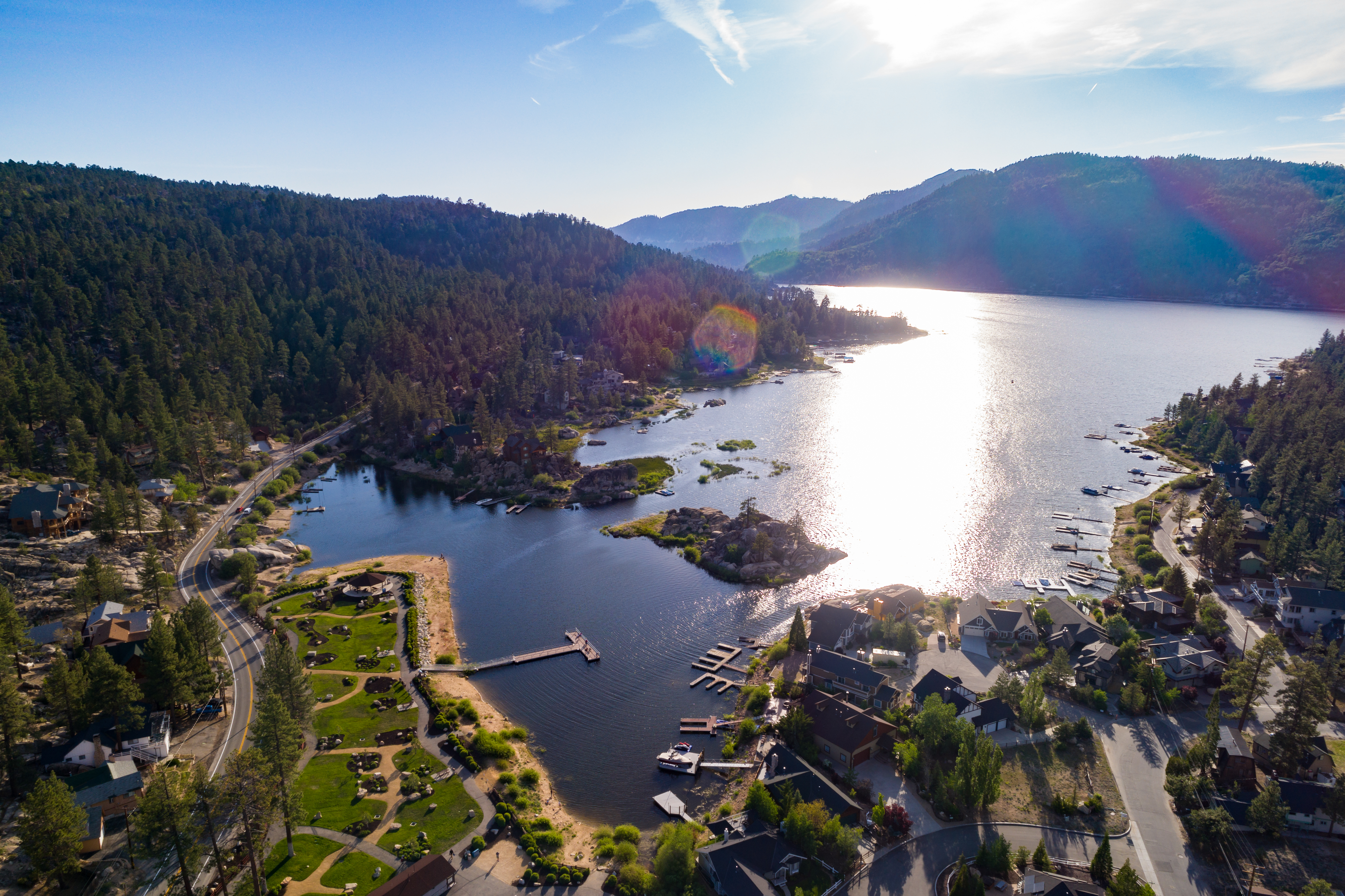
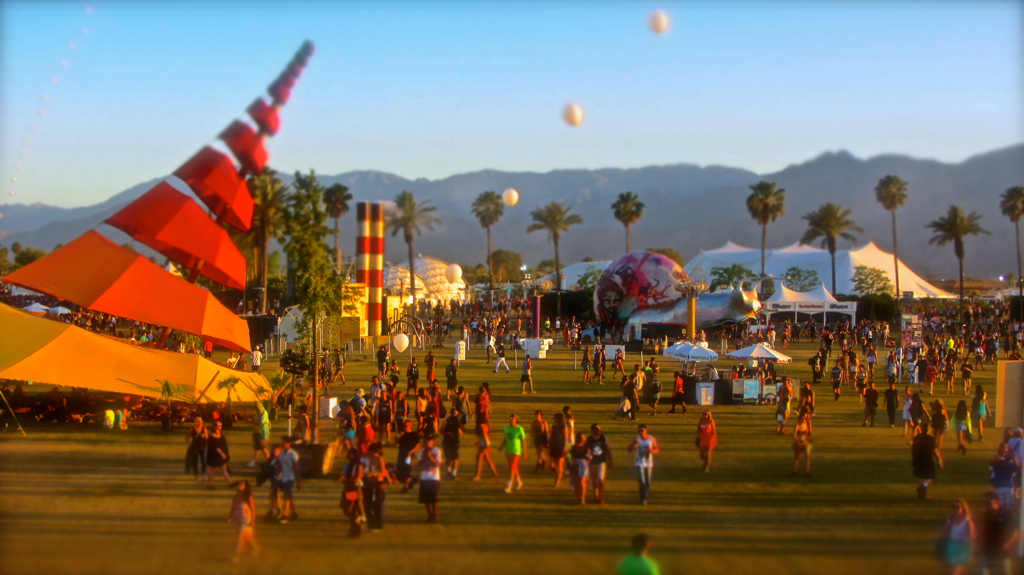
- San Bernardino Valley Joshua Tree San Gorgonio Mountain Downtown San Bernardino Riverside Big Bear Lake Coachella Festival in Indio

- Country: United States
- State: California
- Counties: Riverside; San Bernardino
- Ten largest cities by population (2010 U.S. Census): Riverside (RV); San Bernardino (SB); Fontana (SB); Moreno Valley (RV); Rancho Cucamonga (SB); Ontario (SB); Corona (RV); Victorville (SB); Murrieta (RV); Temecula (RV); by city size: Palm Springs (RV) (94.98 sq mi. area) and Apple Valley (SB) (77.08 sq mi. area)
- Region: Southern California

Area
  - Metro: 27,285 sq mi (70,669 km^{2})
- Elevation: −220–11,506 ft (−67.1–3,507 m)

Population (2020)
  - Density: 147/sq mi (56.9/km^{2})
  - Urban: 1,932,666 (22nd)
  - Urban density: 3,434/sq mi (1,325.9/km^{2})
  - Metro: 4,599,839 (12th)
  - Combined Statistical Area (CSA): 18,710,563 (2nd)

GDP
  - Metro: $256.859 billion (2023)
- Time zone: UTC−08:00 (PST)
  - Summer (DST): UTC−07:00 (PDT)

The Inland Empire (commonly abbreviated IE) is a metropolitan area and region located inland from coastal Southern California. Centering on the cities of Riverside and San Bernardino and encompassing their respective counties, it lies to the east of Los Angeles County and Orange County. The region, in its narrowest definition, includes the cities of northwestern Riverside County and southwestern San Bernardino County that are part of the urbanized area of Greater Los Angeles. It is sometimes considered to include the desert communities of the Coachella and Victor valleys opposite the San Gorgonio Pass and San Bernardino Mountains from the Santa Ana River watershed, which creates the majority of the Inland Empire. The region's most comprehensive definition includes all of Riverside and San Bernardino counties, stretching east to the borders of Nevada and Arizona and covering a larger area than West Virginia. This is the definition primarily used by the U.S. Census Bureau and the Office of Management and Budget (OMB), the two federal agencies that exclusively delineate U.S. metropolitan areas at the county level.

The U.S. Census Bureau–defined Riverside–San Bernardino–Ontario metropolitan area, which comprises both Riverside County and San Bernardino County, covers more than 27,000 sq mi (70,000 km^{2}) and had a population of about 4.6 million in 2020. At the end of the 19th century, the Inland Empire was a major center of agriculture, including citrus, dairy and winemaking. Agriculture declined through the 20th century and a rapidly increasing population, helped by families migrating in search of affordable housing, has led to more residential, industrial and commercial development since the 1970s.

== Etymology ==
The term Inland Empire is documented to have been used by the Riverside Enterprise newspaper (now The Press-Enterprise) as early as April 1914. Developers in the area likely introduced the term to promote the region and to highlight the area's unique features. The "Inland" part of the name is derived from the region's location, generally about 60 miles (97 km) inland from Los Angeles and the Pacific Ocean. Originally, this area was called the Orange Empire due to the acres of citrus groves which extended from Pasadena to Redlands during the first half of the 20th century. The boundaries of the Inland Empire are nebulous, but the region is generally defined as the cities of western Riverside County and southwestern San Bernardino County, adjacent to the Los Angeles metropolitan area. A broader definition includes Palm Springs and the surrounding desert communities, and a much more widespread definition includes all of San Bernardino and Riverside counties.

== History ==
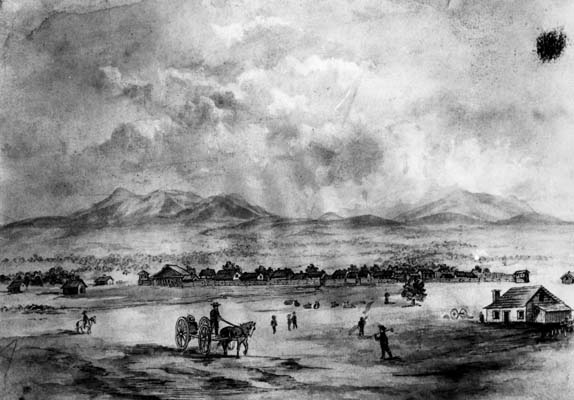
Drawing of San Bernardino (1852)

What is now known as the Inland Empire was inhabited for thousands of years, prior to the late 18th century, by the Tongva, Taaqtam, Ivilyuqaletem and Payómkawichum Native Americans. The first American settlers, a group of Mormon pioneers, arrived over the Cajon Pass in 1851. They brought roughly 26 slaves with them, one of whom was Biddy Mason, despite California having been labeled a "free state". The Mormons also bought and indentured the local natives. This was allowed under the Act for the Government and Protection of Indians in 1850. Although the Mormons left a scant six years later, recalled to Salt Lake City by Brigham Young during the church's Utah War with the U.S. government, other settlers soon followed.

The entire landmass of Southern California was subdivided according to the San Bernardino Meridian, which was first plotted as part of the Public Land Survey System in November 1852, by Col. Henry Washington. Base Line Road, a major thoroughfare, today runs from Highland to San Dimas, intermittently along the absolute baseline coordinates plotted by Col. Washington. San Bernardino County was first formed out of parts of Los Angeles County on April 26, 1853. While the partition once included what is today most of Riverside County, the region is not as monolithic as it may sound. Rivalries between Colton, Redlands, Riverside and San Bernardino over the location of the county seat in the 1890s caused each of them to form their own civic communities, each with their own newspapers. On August 14, 1893, the state Senate allowed Riverside County to form out of land previously in San Bernardino and San Diego counties, after rejecting a bill for Pomona to split from L.A. County and become the seat of what would have been called San Antonio County.

The arrival of rail and the importation of navel and Valencia orange trees in the 1870s touched off explosive growth, with the area quickly becoming a major center for citrus production. This agricultural boom continued with the arrival of water from the Colorado River and the rapid growth of Los Angeles in the early 20th century, with dairy farming becoming another staple industry.

In the mid 19th century, the success of the citrus and railroad industry attracted Asian immigrants to the region, where they often accepted lower wages. In 1867, the first known Chinatown in the region was in San Bernardino. However, anti-Asian sentiment that continued with the Chinese Exclusion Act resulted in their resettlement outside of city limits along Third Street between Arrowhead Avenue and Sierra Way. At its peak, the community had a population of 400-600. They owned restaurants, groceries, and a Buddhist temple that displayed a statue of Guanyin which attracted other Asian visitors across Southern California. The region's largest Chinatown was on Ninth Street in Riverside, which populated about 400, but as high as 3,000 during peak harvest season. It was locally known as "Little Gom-Benn" since most residents originated from the Gom-Benn village in Taishan, Guangdong. The Panic of 1893 led to hundreds of white laborers in Redlands to riot against Asian communities. Asian laborers, who often worked for less, often kept their jobs during the panic, which angered unemployed white workers. Mobs and armed white gangs burned and looted businesses while threatening the lives of Asian locals if they did not leave town. The National Guard was deployed in the region to quell the unrest. The first American Koreatown known as Pachappa Camp was founded nearly a decade later in Riverside by Ahn Chang Ho in 1904. Continued nativist sentiment as well as reoccurring fires led to the decline of these communities over the next half century resulting in the land being redeveloped. This is with the exception of Riverside's former Chinatown, which is recognized as an archeological site. Artifacts from these communities are found in local museums.

Likewise, the region's wealth attracted entrepreneurs, allowing for further development. A major example is the Chaffey Brothers who were Canadian entrepreneurs who established the hydroelectric-powered irrigation colonies of Etiwanda, Ontario (named after their home province of Ontario), and Upland, as Matthew Gage in Riverside developed the Gage Canal in the 1880s. The brothers also founded Chaffey College in Ontario in 1883 and was originally dedicated to agriculture as part of their "Model Colony" to create a highly efficient and well organized town. The area, formerly known as New Model Colony, is now known as Ontario Ranch. The year 1893 saw the development of the historic Milk Creek No. 1 Hydroelectric Plant near Redlands. It powered irrigation pumps and was the first commercial three phase commercial AC power plant in the US. These developments led to the region being one of the wealthiest in the United States in the late 19th century, notably Riverside in 1895.

President Benjamin Harrison was the first president to visit the region in 1891 as part of his 21 state tour by train. He spoke at the Glenwood Hotel in Riverside (now known as The Mission Inn) starting a tradition of presidential visits to the region.

The region's growing development increasingly displaced the native population. The Spanish mission system in California, notably the Mission San Gabriel Arcángel, forced natives to assimilate and convert to catholicism in the 18th century. The late 18th century and early 19th century saw the development of rancho outposts, such as Redlands' Asistencia, that went more inland to increase mission outreach. The California gold rush saw the influx of migration to the region, which increased tensions between the new settlers and the indigenous communities, resulting in skirmishes that resulted in the death of Yuhaaviatam leader Kiika. From their original land that eventually became the National Orange Show, the natives were finally completely removed from their settlements in 1891. Throughout the century, natives were allowed to be forced into labor as part of the 1850 Act for the Government and Protection of Indians until it was repealed in 1866 following the ratification of the 13th Amendment. in 1891, California passed the Act of Relief for Mission Indians which grouped the inland tribes and recognized them as "San Manuel Band of Mission Indians" and granted them the San Manuel Reservation. Despite this small victory, assimilation of the indigenous population was still an important goal of the government. The Perris Indian School was the most prevalent boarding school in the area before it was moved to Riverside and was named the Sherman Institute (now a high school) in 1903. Frank Miller, owner of the Mission Inn, campaigned to have the school relocated near the hotel. He believed it would increase tourism while also providing the hotel with cheap labor and even entertainment.

In 1926, Route 66 (now known as Foothill Boulevard and Interstate 215) came through the northern parts of the area, bringing a stream of tourists and migrants to the region. Still, the region endured as the key part of the Southern California "citrus belt" until the end of World War II, when a new generation of real-estate developers bulldozed acres of agricultural land to build suburbs. The precursor to the San Bernardino Freeway, the Ramona Expressway, was built in 1944, and further development of the freeway system in the area facilitated the expansion of suburbs and human migration throughout the Inland Empire and Southern California.

The region experienced significant economic and population growth through most of the latter half of the 20th century. In the early 1990s, the loss of the region's military bases and reduction of nearby defense industries due to the end of the Cold War led to a local economic downturn. The region as a whole had partially recovered from this downturn by the start of the 21st century through the development of warehousing, shipping, logistics and retail industries, primarily centered around Ontario. During the 2008 Recession, industry suffered heavily but had begun to recover by 2010.

== Geography ==
=== Physical geography ===
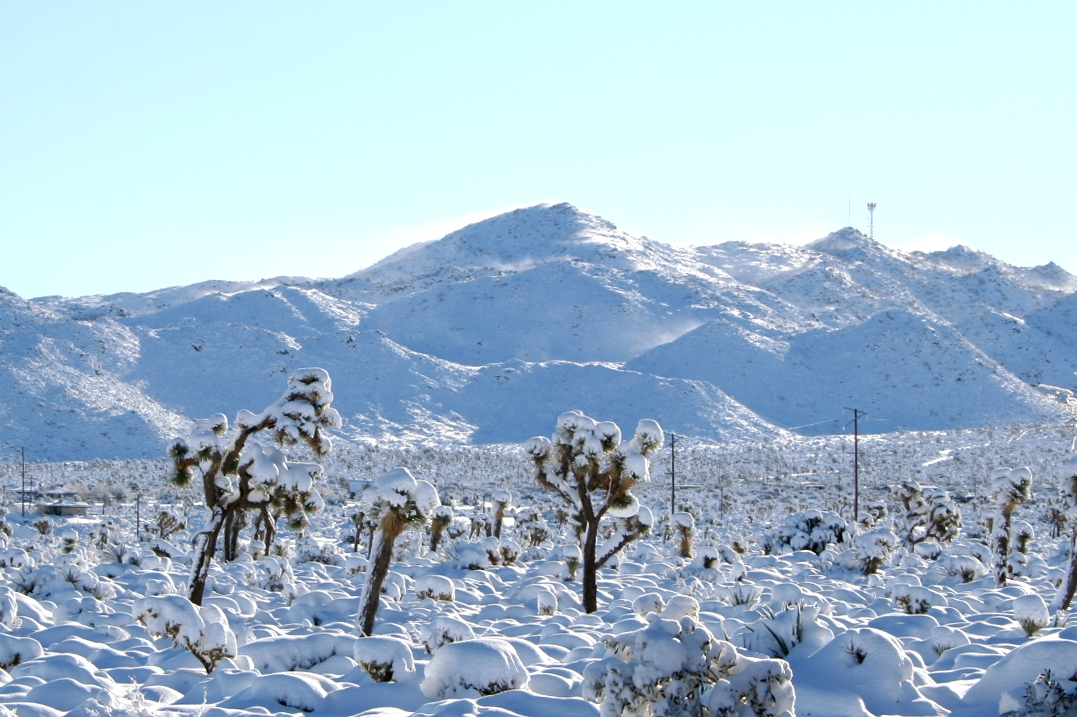
Yucca Valley, within the Morongo Basin, is halfway between the San Bernardino Valley and the Arizona state line.

Physical boundaries between Los Angeles and the Inland Empire from west to east are the San Jose Hills, splitting the San Gabriel Valley from the Pomona Valley, leading to the urban populations centered in the San Bernardino Valley. From the south to north, the Santa Ana Mountains physically divide Orange County from Riverside County. The Santa Rosa Mountains, as well as the Southern California portion of the Sonoran Desert, physically divide Riverside County from San Diego County.

Elevations range from 11,499 ft (3,505 m) at the top of San Gorgonio Mountain to −220 ft (−67 m) at the Salton Sea. The San Bernardino mountains are home to the San Bernardino National Forest and the resort communities of Big Bear Lake, Lake Arrowhead, and Running Springs. The Santa Ana River extends from Mt. San Gorgonio for nearly 100 miles (160 km) through San Bernardino, Riverside, and Orange counties before it eventually spills into the Pacific Ocean at Newport Beach and Huntington Beach. While temperatures are generally cool to cold in the mountains, it can get hot in the valleys. In the desert resort of Palm Springs, near Joshua Tree National Park, summer temperatures can reach well over 110 °F (43 °C).

=== Political geography ===
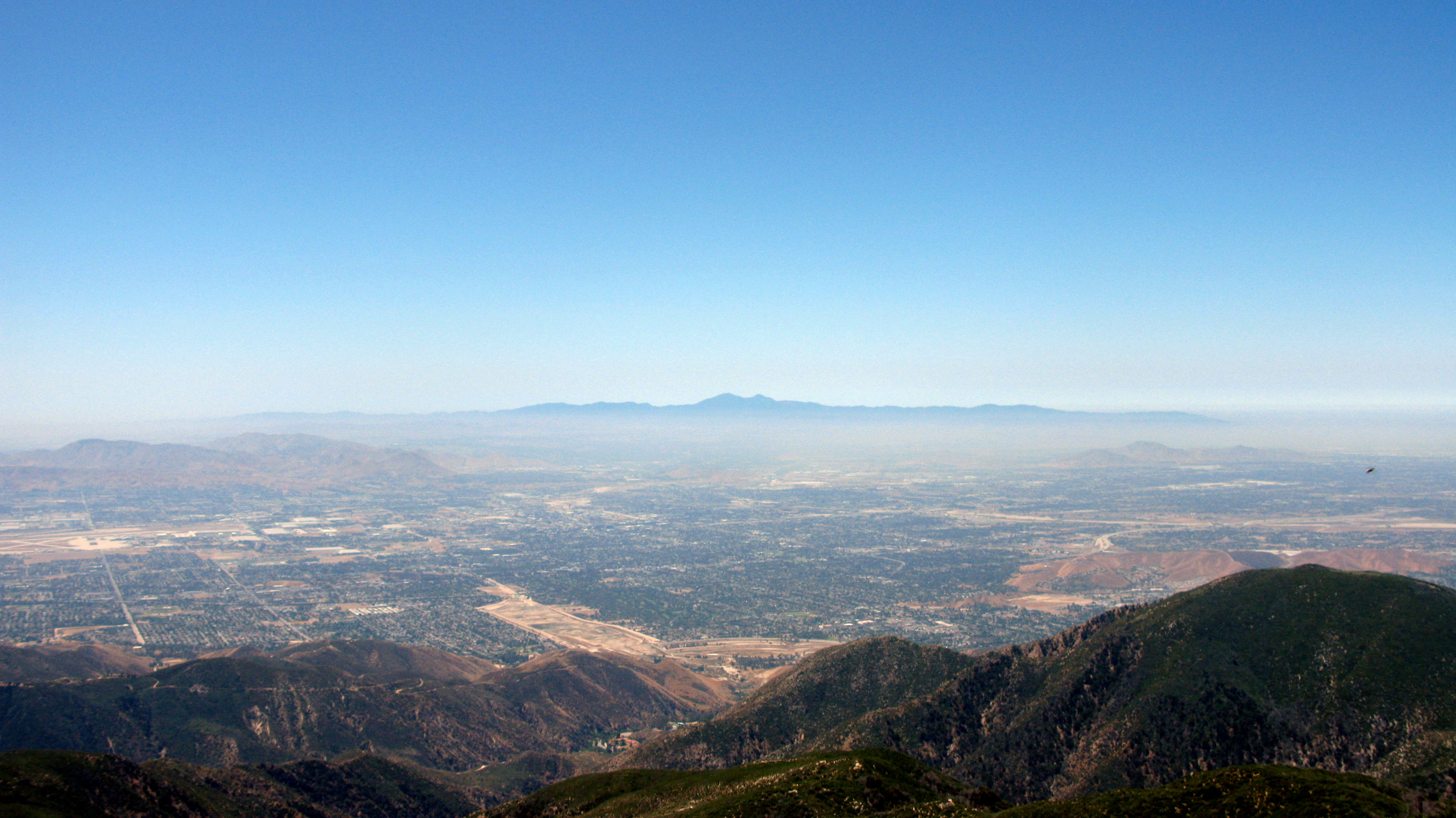
View of the San Bernardino Valley from the San Bernardino Mountains. The Santa Ana Mountains are visible in the distance.

Unlike most metropolitan areas that have grown up around a central city, the Inland Empire has two main focus cities, Riverside and San Bernardino. Other major cities in the region include Rancho Cucamonga, Ontario, and Corona. Suburban sprawl spreads out to form a connection with the Los Angeles metropolitan area. Further development is steadily, if not heavily, encroaching past the mountains into the outlying desert areas. The Inland Empire borders both Los Angeles and Orange counties. Freeways in Southern California are heavily used, but this comprehensive freeway system has made travel between the Inland Empire and these two counties generally direct, especially to and from Los Angeles County.

The Inland Empire has also been referred to as the 909, after one of the region's most used area codes. In 2004, because of growing demand for telephone numbers, most of western Riverside County was granted a second area code, 951, which is overlaid with the 909 area code.

The Coachella Valley region of Palm Springs, Palm Desert, and Indio is located much farther east in Riverside County (the distance between the city of San Bernardino and Palm Springs is approximately 50 miles) and is part of the much larger 760 area code. This area is sometimes considered a sub-region of the Inland Empire or its own separate region, the Desert Empire. This is to help differentiate it from the urbanized area containing the cities of San Bernardino and Riverside.

The RPA definition includes the Inland Empire (San Bernardino–Riverside) in the Southern California Megaregion, alongside Anaheim, Bakersfield, Huntington Beach, Long Beach, Los Angeles, San Diego, the geographically separate Las Vegas Valley, as well as the Tijuana area in Mexico. Orange County and San Diego County are completely encompassed within the megaregion.

=== Boundaries and definitions ===
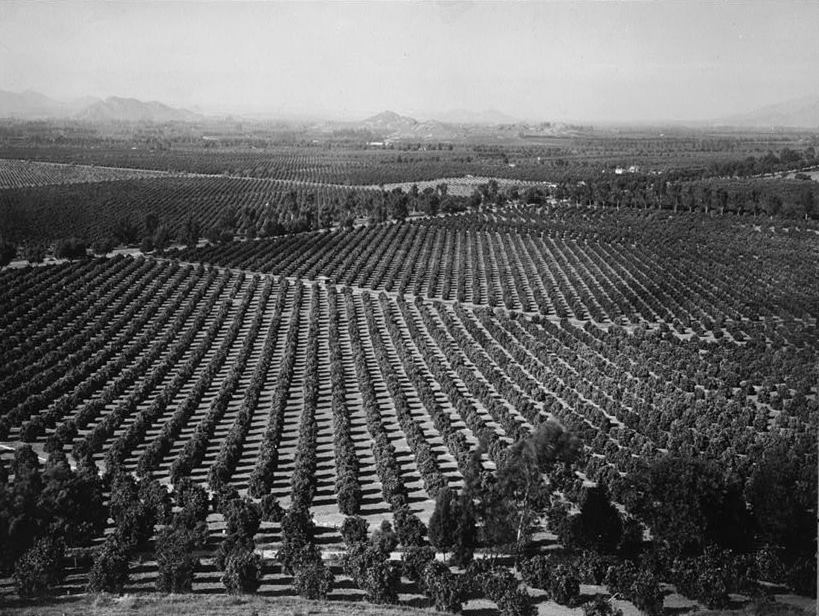
Arlington Heights Citrus Groves, Riverside circa 1903

There is no universally accepted definition for the boundaries of the Inland Empire region. Some sources such as the Los Angeles Times have referred to Riverside County and San Bernardino County as the Inland Empire, mirroring the Riverside-San Bernardino-Ontario metropolitan area. Kern County is occasionally included within the Inland Empire.

Some residents of certain areas, such as Twentynine Palms or the Coachella and Temecula valleys, may consider themselves separate from the IE. The California Travel and Tourism Commission (CTTC), a not-for-profit, nongovernmental entity that promotes tourism in California, divides the state into several regions for its own purposes. The CTTC defines the Inland Empire as being bounded by Los Angeles County and Orange County on the west and San Diego County on the south, stretching as far north as the Victor Valley area and as far east as Idyllwild in the San Jacinto Mountains. The state of California's official website links to the CTTC's map with the description "Map of the Inland Empire region".

Other sources, including Kevin Starr, former state librarian of California, include the eastern Los Angeles County cities of the Pomona Valley, such as Claremont, Pomona, La Verne, San Dimas, and Diamond Bar. Other sources also include cities in Los Angeles County within the boundaries.

== Economy ==
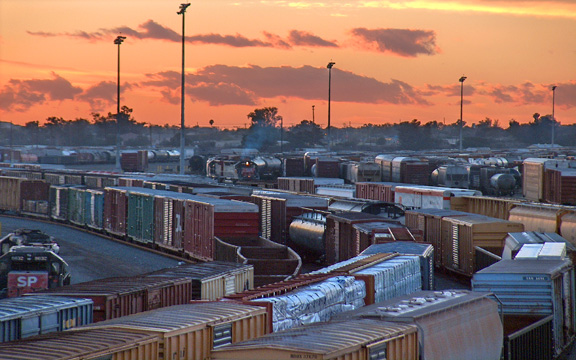
Boxcars, Rialto, California

Inexpensive land prices (compared with Los Angeles and Orange counties), a large supply of vacant land, and a transport network where many highways and railroads intersect have made the Inland Empire a major shipping hub. Some of the nation's largest manufacturing companies have chosen the Inland Empire for their distribution facilities including Toyota Motor Corporation's North American Parts and Logistics Distribution (NAPLD) center in Ontario and APL Logistics in Rancho Cucamonga. In 2007, Whirlpool Corporation leased a 1,700,000-square-foot (160,000 m^{2}) distribution center in Perris that is larger than 31 football fields, but, more recently, 5,000,000 sqft warehouses are common. These centers operate as part of the system that transports finished goods and materials from the ports of Los Angeles and Long Beach to destinations to the north and east such as Las Vegas, Phoenix, and Denver. More than 80 percent of the state's imported cargo is shipped through the Los Angeles/Inland Empire Corridor. During the late 2010s and early 2020s, Amazon, the largest private employer in the region, has rapidly expanded its facilities and warehouses there, responding to explosive growth in online retailing and shipping and increasing traffic and air pollution.

Like most industrial areas, the Inland Empire is vulnerable to the effects of economic recessions. For example, during the global economic downturn of 2008–2009, industrial vacancies doubled from 6.2 percent in 2007 to 12.4 percent to 2008. In San Bernardino and Redlands, vacancies reached 22 percent.

The Inland Empire area is one of the least educated areas of the state with the lowest average in annual wages in the country. A 2006 study of salaries in 51 metropolitan areas of the country ranked the Inland Empire second to last, with an average annual wage of $36,924. Nonetheless, inexpensive land prices and innovative institutional support networks have attracted some small businesses and technology startups into the area.

While urbanization continues to cut into agricultural lands, the Inland Empire still produces substantial crops. Although 10,000 acres (40 km^{2}) of irrigated land was lost between 2002 and 2004, agriculture still brought in more than $1.6 billion in revenues to the two-county region in 2006.

Being a MSA, aggregate GDP figures are reported by the Bureau of Economic Analysis annually. The Inland Empire ranks 25th in the nation with a 2011 GDP of $109.8 billion, roughly a third of San Francisco–Oakland–Berkeley, CA Metropolitan Statistical Area despite their close population numbers. Per capita GDP was $25,993.34 in 2011, nearly half among the nation's top 50 Gross Metropolitan Product. Due to the housing crisis, the GDP fell from $114.8 billion in 2007, despite a heavy influx of residents.

The unemployment rate in the Inland Empire has been consistently over the national average since 2007. 10.4 percent of Inland residents were unemployed as of August 2013, compared with the national rate of 7.3 percent. Due to the high unemployment and housing foreclosure rates, a higher percentage of Inland residents rely on public assistance. According to the Press-Enterprise, "twelve percent of Riverside County and 17 percent of San Bernardino County residents used food stamps in January 2012", as compared with "11 percent of those living in Los Angeles County, 8 percent of San Diego County residents and 7 percent of Orange County residents".

=== Housing ===
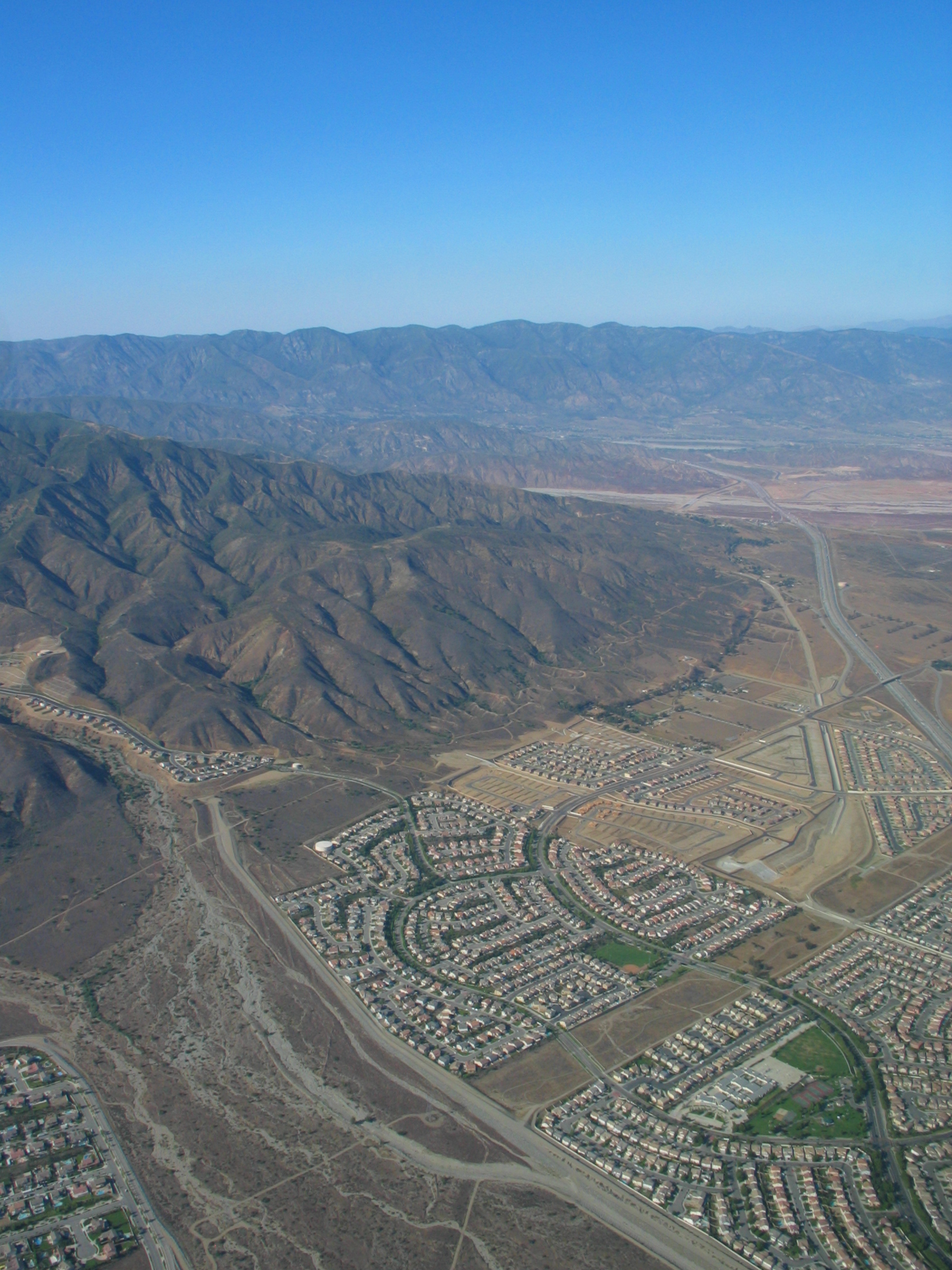
Housing construction in Fontana, looking northeast along Interstate 15 during 2007. Since 1980, the city's population has grown by 170,000.

Since the 1950s, the area has changed from a rural to a suburban environment. The region now comprises numerous cities known as bedroom communities that are suburban cities to Los Angeles, Orange County, and San Diego. Affordable home ownership is the primary motivation behind the growth in these Inland Empire cities as homes in the region are generally less expensive than comparable homes in Los Angeles and Orange counties, but the pricing gap continues to shrink each year due to migration and increasing population. The steady rise in population and the demand for housing has led to a dramatic increase in the building of single-family homes on parcels of 0.25 acres (1,000 m^{2}) or more, as opposed to the construction of high-density development such as multi-story apartment or condominium buildings. This low-density development has caused sprawl in the Inland Empire. Additionally, land that was used for agriculture is now being sold by owners for conversion to shopping centers, industrial warehouses, and more. Due to the lack of one central city in the Inland Empire, and the smaller geographical footprint that suburban cities tend to have, this continuous development has become seemingly unplanned suburban sprawl as local interest and zoning laws may quickly change from one city to the next city. The Inland Empire was declared the nation's worst example of sprawl according to a study by Smart Growth America in 2002.

During the housing bubble collapse of the late 2000s, foreclosures rose by 3,500 percent. In 2010, the area ranked fourth in the nation in the number of foreclosures, with one filing for every 133 households. The problem of abandoned homes became so great that the city of Perris initiated a program to paint the brown lawns of abandoned homes green as a way to reduce the appearance of blight.

In 2019, the "bedroom community" nature of the Inland Empire led to a plan to increase the construction of new housing in coastal cities (known as "job centers") preferentially versus building more housing in the Inland Empire areas. Meghan Sahli-Wells, mayor of Culver City, said that she supported the coastal plan because of the urgent nature of climate change. However, the plan was described as "toothless".

The attractiveness of Inland Empire cities for warehousing and logistics has resulted in warehouses being built incrementally closer and closer to residential areas. With air pollution from diesel-powered transport trucks being a serious and cumulative concern for human health, an effort was made to impose a 1,000-foot buffer zone (separation distance between residential and commercial land uses) for new construction. However, this effort was not successful, due to local municipal officials giving priority to maximizing the construction of both housing and warehouse facilities, with the goal of maximizing employment as well as property-tax revenue from both the residential and the commercial/industrial sectors.

=== Retail ===
Retailing in the area has increased to try to keep abreast with the growing suburban population. The region is home to several large shopping malls, including the Promenade Shops at Dos Lagos and the Crossings in Corona; Ontario Mills in Ontario; Promenade Mall in Temecula; Galleria at Tyler, Riverside Plaza, and Canyon Crossings in Riverside; The Shoppes at Chino Hills in Chino Hills; Moreno Valley Mall in Moreno Valley; Victoria Gardens in Rancho Cucamonga; Montclair Place in Montclair; and the Inland Center mall in San Bernardino. In fiscal year 2006, retail sales in San Bernardino County grew by 11.9 percent to $31.2 billion, while sales in Riverside County were up 11.3 percent to $29.6 billion.

Panorama of the "Town Square" at Victoria Gardens in Rancho Cucamonga

== Environmental quality ==
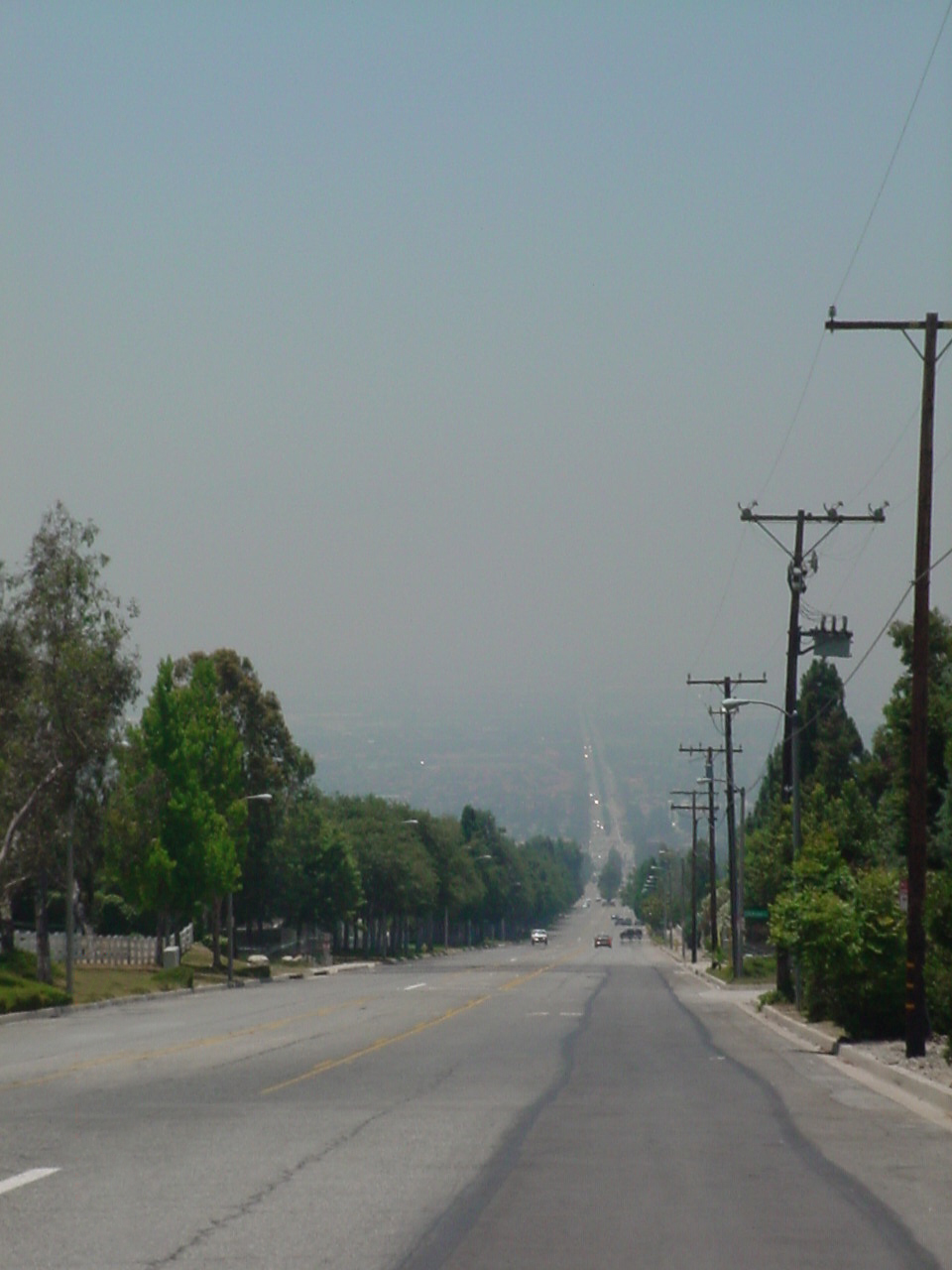
The Inland Empire is subject to smog conditions regularly, as seen here, looking south, from the north terminus of Haven Avenue in Rancho Cucamonga. Note how the street "fades" into the smoggy haze and the Santa Ana Mountains are completely obscured.

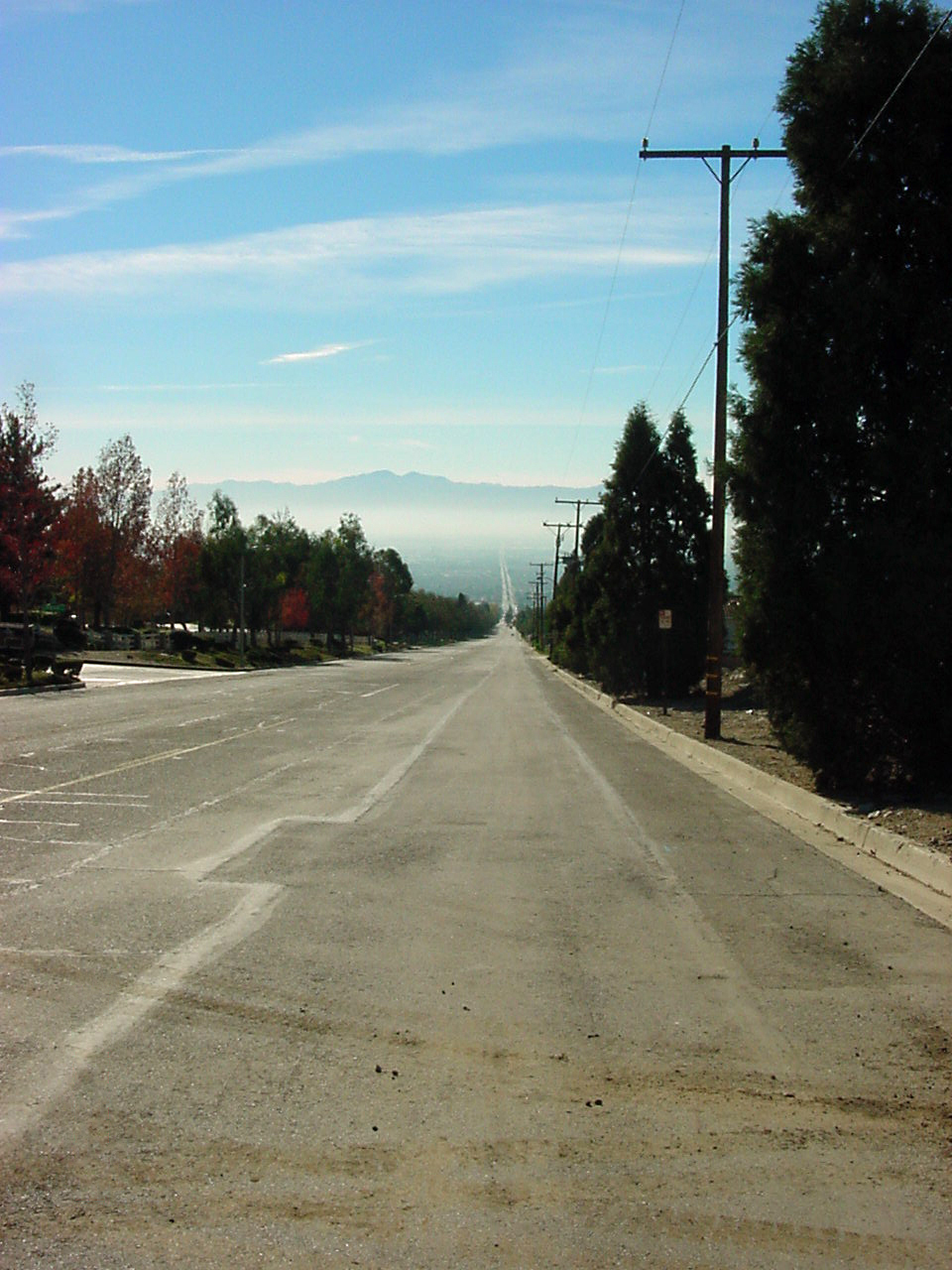
The Inland Empire is also subject to Santa Ana Winds that lead to generally clear days, free of smog or the marine layer. Note how the street that "faded" into the smoggy haze and the Santa Ana Mountains that were completely obscured in the adjacent image are now visible.

The result of this ongoing development has been greater homeownership for the region. Although the region saw an uptick in jobs over the past decade, it is not a heavy employment center, and many residents commute to Los Angeles and Orange counties for their work. With a lack of substantial public transportation in the Greater Los Angeles Area, this has led to traffic congestion and degradation in air quality for the Inland Empire. The solution to these problems is not simple. The presence of so many city governments within the Inland Empire, which often have different 'visions' for their own municipalities, means that two cities in the region rarely agree on a solution; just as commonly, they may have unequal means for implementing one even if they were to agree. Having no region-wide governmental planning organization may undermine any solution that could be proposed. Lastly, the fast pace at which development occurs versus the limited ability of government to respond to changes means that it could easily take years, if not decades, for a viable solution (such as new roads, transit systems, or pollution controls) to go into effect.

=== Air pollution ===
The Inland Empire routinely has some of the worst air quality in the United States. San Bernardino County and Riverside County are the first and second worst counties in the United States for tropospheric ozone air pollution. Pollution in Southern California mostly is blown from the coast towards the mountains. Inland Empire counties are downwind of the highly populated counties of Los Angeles and Orange County. The largest sources of air pollution affecting the Inland Empire include off-road equipment (e.g., construction equipment, cargo-handling equipment), heavy-duty diesel trucks, ocean-going vessels, passenger vehicles, locomotives, aircraft, and industrial fuel combustion. Southern California is in extreme nonattainment for ozone and severe nonattainment for particle pollution.

Multiple state and local efforts are underway to clean up the air, primarily focused on zero-emission vehicles. California has implemented some of the most aggressive vehicle electrification rules in the country, including the Advanced Clean Cars II rule that will mandate 100% zero-emission passenger vehicle sales in 2035, and the Advanced Clean Fleets rule for trucks that will require all drayage trucks to be zero-emissions starting in 2024 and all trucks to ZEV by 2036.

=== Water pollution ===
Water pollution has been found in the Santa Ana River and Cajon wash, and pollutants from the March Air Reserve Base and Stringfellow Acid Pits have contaminated groundwater in parts of Riverside County. In 1997, perchlorate, a chemical used to produce explosives, was discovered to be seeping into the groundwater under Rialto in a plume that continues to grow. In 2007, the Rialto city council petitioned the United States Environmental Protection Agency (EPA) for Superfund status to clean up the original site. The sites comprising March Air Reserve Base, Norton Air Force Base and the Stringfellow Acid Pits have already been classified as EPA Superfund toxic waste sites.

== Transportation ==
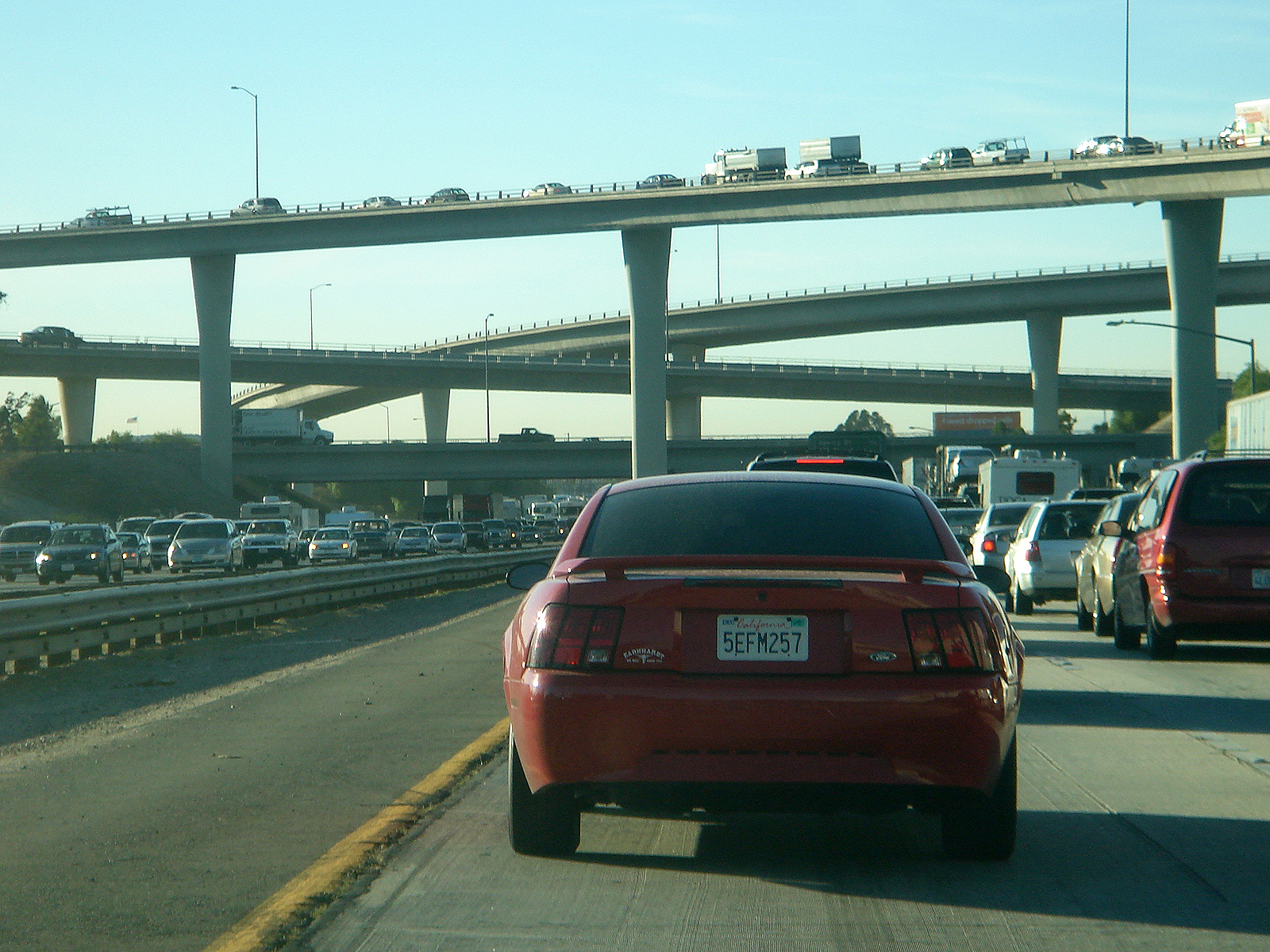
I-10–I-215 Interchange traffic, south of downtown San Bernardino

Traffic congestion is a major issue in the Inland Empire. Many of the existing freeways were completed in the late 1970s except for the segment of the Foothill Freeway, State Route 210 (SR 210) between San Dimas and San Bernardino, which was completed in July 2007. New freeways or highway "fix-ups" are either in progress or being planned, such as the construction of Mid County Parkway between Perris and San Jacinto or the addition of toll lanes on both I-15 and I-10 through heavily urbanized portions of Riverside and San Bernardino counties. Other problems exist, however, including the imbalance between housing and job availability. The Inland Empire population grew as a result of affordable housing, at least relative to the rest of Southern California, but most of the higher-paying jobs are located in Los Angeles, San Diego and Orange counties. Thus, many workers must commute daily from the Inland Empire to their jobs in these counties—sometimes up to two hours each direction—and even longer if by public transportation. As the population increases, the problem is most certainly going to get worse. Forbes magazine ranked the area first in its 2007 list of most unhealthy commutes in the United States, beating out every other metropolitan area in the country, as Inland area drivers breathe the unhealthiest air and have the highest rate of fatal auto accidents per capita.

According to a 1999 report by the Surface Transportation Policy Project, the Inland Empire leads in fatal crashes caused by road rage. The theft of copper, brass and other metals from highway and road fixtures has also led to decreased public safety on IE roads and freeways. Gas siphoning has also been noted as a problem for vehicles left unattended in the region.

=== Public transportation ===
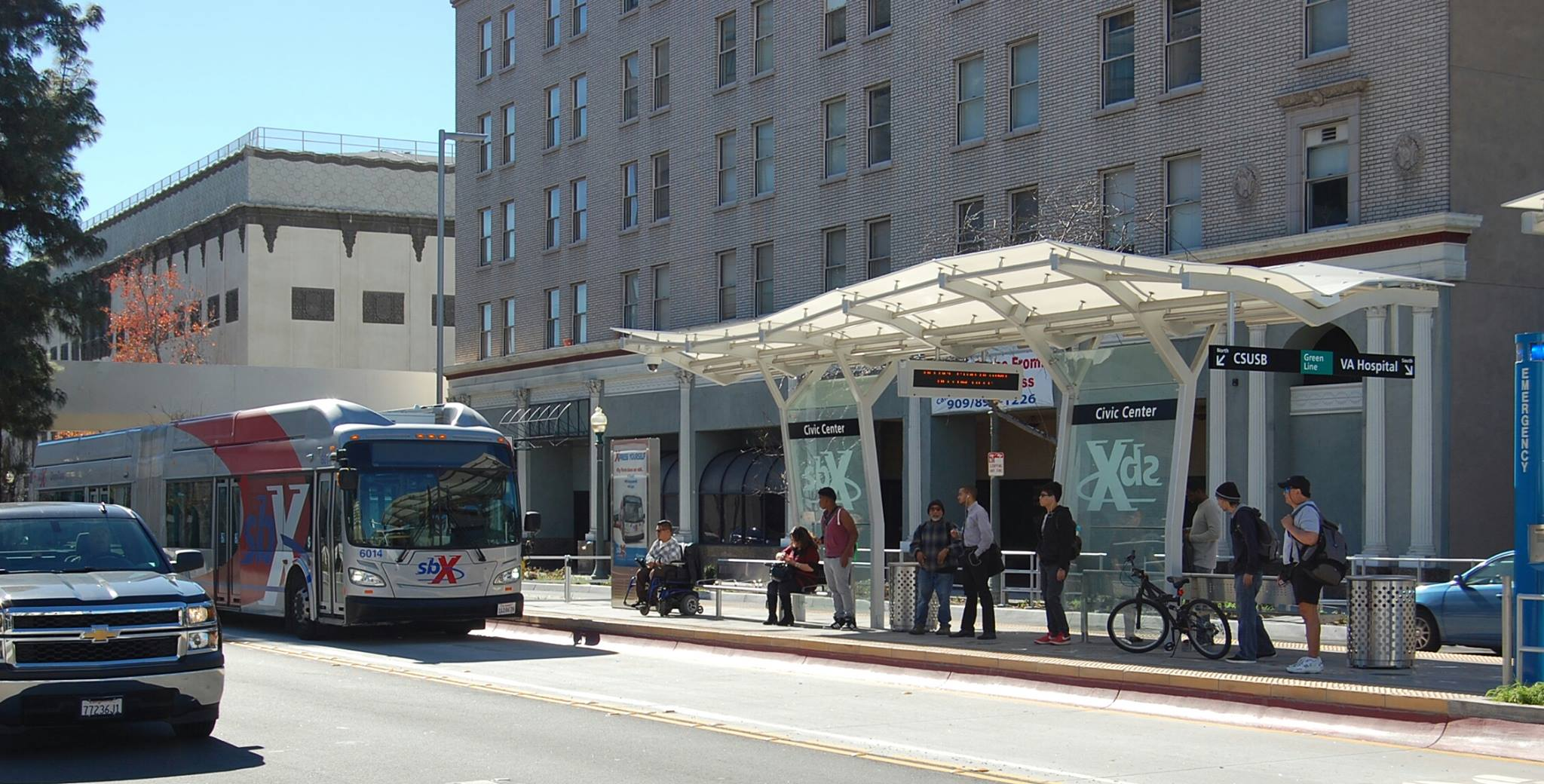
sbX Green Line's Civic Center station in downtown San Bernardino

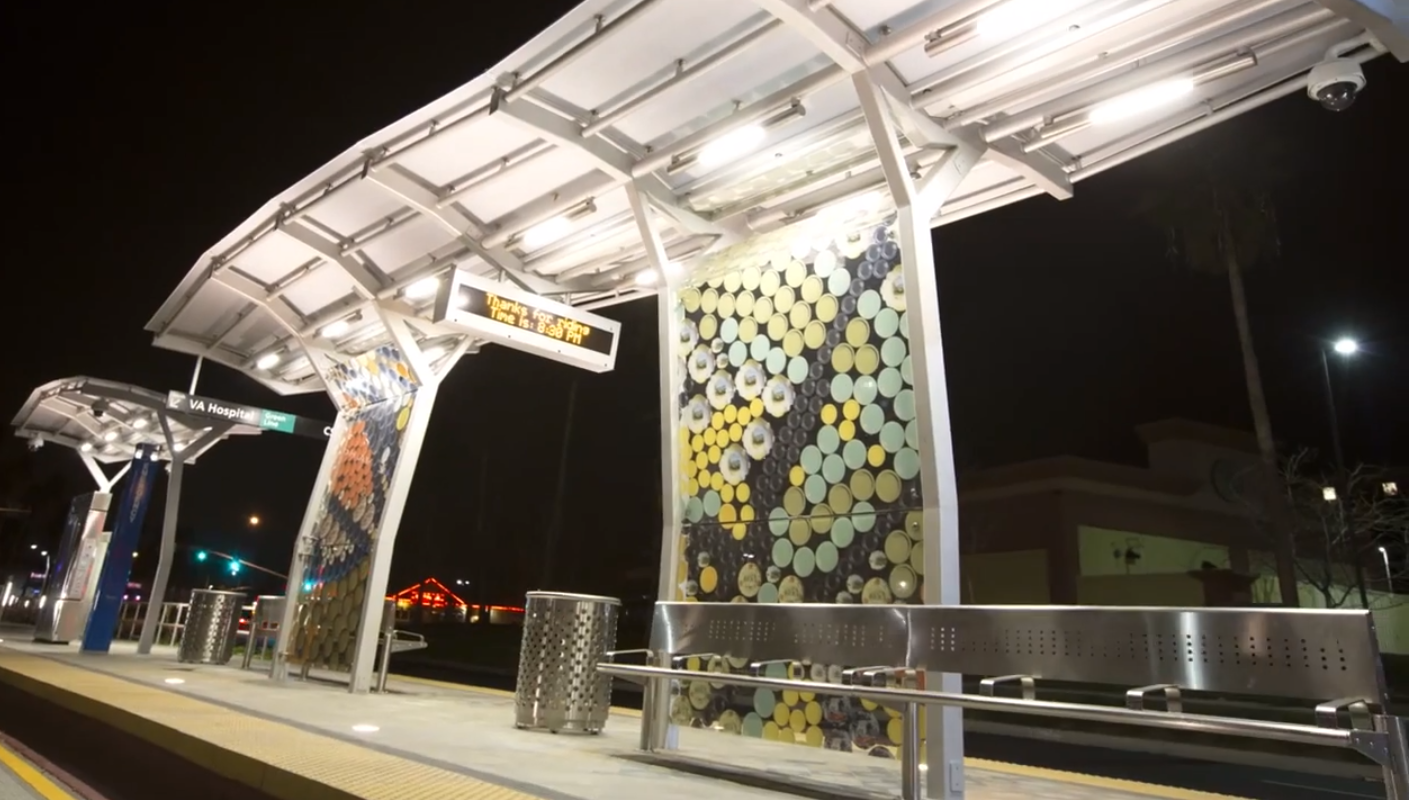
sbX Hospitality West Station, downtown San Bernardino

The Inland Empire does not have a particularly extensive or robust public transportation system. Due to the large physical size and sprawl of the region, the primary means of transportation in the region is the automobile. Less than five percent of the IE's 1,249,224 working-age residents use public transportation to get to work.

Omnitrans is the largest bus agency in San Bernardino County, while the Riverside Transit Agency (RTA) is the largest in Riverside County. Currently, some of Omnitrans' bus routes run on headways of an hour or more, and some routes stop service in the early evening or may not run on weekends. SunLine Transit Agency provides bus service in the Coachella Valley while the Victor Valley Transit Authority (VVTA) provides transit service in the High Desert, including to Barstow after the transit systems in the latter was merged into VVTA in 2015. Other operators in the region include Pass Transit serving the Banning Pass area, Needles Area Transit serving the city of Needles, Mountain Transit serving the communities in the San Bernardino Mountains including Lake Arrowhead, Big Bear, Running Springs, and Crestline, and the MBTA serving the Morongo Basin and Yucca Valley portions of San Bernardino County.

Although transit usage and infrastructure remain weak, several projects have moved forward and opened in the 2010s to improve transit accessibility in the region. Major projects include the Perris Valley portion of the Metrolink 91/Perris Valley Line, the San Bernardino Transit Center, and the Omnitrans sbX Green Line, which connects the cities of Loma Linda and San Bernardino, two universities, and the Loma Linda VA Hospital to the San Bernardino Transit Center. In addition to sbX, there are other express services available to public transportation users in the region. RTA operated (discontinued sometime during early 2020) a BRT-lite system in the RapidLink Gold Line, which runs from UCR to the Corona Transit Center.

Due to the physical size of the Inland Empire, transit connections between the nodes of the region are primarily served by freeway express services. Transit operators of the IE provide service between major destinations and transit centers around Southern California, including the San Bernardino Transit Center, the Montclair Transit Center, Disneyland, Pomona–Downtown station, and the Oceanside Transit Center.

The region is also part of the five-county Southern California Regional Rail Authority (SCRRA) "Metrolink" commuter rail system. Of the seven lines that Metrolink operates, four of them directly serve the Inland Empire:

- San Bernardino Line: provides daily service from San Bernardino to Los Angeles (busiest route of the system)
- 91/Perris Valley Line: provides weekday service from Perris to Los Angeles and weekend service between Riverside and Los Angeles
- Riverside Line: provides weekday commuter service from downtown Riverside to Los Angeles
- Inland Empire-Orange County Line: provides daily service from San Bernardino to Oceanside in San Diego County

=== Future projects ===
Although a robust transit network has been lacking in the region for decades, steps are being made toward developing one in the future. The councils of governments and transportation commissions in both IE counties have identified and are working on future expansions of transit to better serve the region. These include the sbX West Valley Connector, Arrow, the extension of the L Line to Montclair (to become part of the A Line), and daily train service to the Coachella Valley. Additional routes have also been studied including extending the Metrolink's Perris Valley Line to San Jacinto and Temecula, a passenger rail spur along I-15 to Lake Elsinore, BRT routes throughout the respective service areas of Omnitrans and RTA, and an aerial tram from Highland to Big Bear.

The Inland Empire is the chosen route for connecting California High-Speed Rail service to San Diego. While a final alignment has yet to be finalized, concepts include stops at the Ontario International Airport, in Riverside, San Bernardino, Corona, and Temecula or Murrieta. These would occur as part of Phase II, however, which currently remains unfunded.

=== Airports ===
Several airports are located in the Inland Empire. San Bernardino International Airport, Ontario International Airport and Palm Springs International Airport are commercial airports in their respective cities. A local joint powers agency has redeveloped the decommissioned Norton Air Force Base into San Bernardino International Airport. There are also several general aviation airports in the region.

Airport	IATA code	ICAO code	County
Ontario International Airport	ONT	KONT	San Bernardino
Palm Springs International Airport	PSP	KPSP	Riverside
San Bernardino International Airport	SBD	KSBD	San Bernardino

=== Active transportation ===
The region is making some progress in developing dedicated bicycle commuter and recreation trails. The largest of these, the Santa Ana River bicycle path, currently connects Corona to Huntington Beach, and is eventually projected to stretch for 84 miles all the way to Redlands when completed. A shorter trail exists along the former path of the Pacific Electric Railway from Claremont to Rialto. A number of communities have also built trails along the levees and maintenance roads of other waterways in the region, including the CV Link, which is under construction in the Coachella Valley area of the region. Other plans also exist to provide feeder trails to meet the main backbones such as the PE Trail and provide a network of connectivity to nonmotorized users throughout the region.

== Demographics ==
The majority of Inland Empire's immigrants come from Mexico, the Philippines, El Salvador, Vietnam and Guatemala.

Historical population
Census	Pop.	Note	%±
1900	45,826		—
1910	91,402		99.5%
1920	123,698		35.3%
1930	214,924		73.7%
1940	266,632		24.1%
1950	451,688		69.4%
1960	809,782		79.3%
1970	1,143,146		41.2%
1980	1,558,182		36.3%
1990	2,588,793		66.1%
2000	3,254,821		25.7%
2010	4,224,851		29.8%
2020	4,599,839		8.9%
U.S. Decennial Census; 1790–1960 1900–1990; 1990–2000

The population of the Greater Los Angeles area (which includes the Inland Empire) is about 18 million people according to the 2010 United States census, and is the second largest metropolitan region in the country. The Metropolitan Statistical Area population of the Inland Empire (Riverside-San Bernardino-Ontario, CA Metropolitan Statistical Area) itself is more than 4.2 million people and is the 12th largest metropolitan area in the United States. According to the 2000 U.S. Census, it is the fastest growing area in the state. Between 1990 and 2000, Riverside and San Bernardino counties added 700,000 to their population totals, an increase of 26 percent. Between 2000 and 2010 Inland Empire's population expanded by 970,000 or 30 percent, and between 2010 and 2020 it expanded by a further 375,000 or another 9 percent to reach 4.6 million. According to census bureau's 2005–2007 estimates 61.8 percent of the population was White (40.4 percent White Non-Hispanic), 7.5 percent Black, 5.7 percent Asian and 25.0 percent of other or mixed race. 43.9 percent were Hispanic of any race. 21.9 percent of the population was foreign born.

There is a large Mexican community in Inland Empire. Filipinos are the largest Asian immigrant group in Inland Empire.

The Centers for Disease Control and Prevention reports that in 2006, 33.1 percent of people in the Greater San Bernardino Area were overweight, and 30.8 percent were obese. In 2019, San Bernardino County found that 34.1% of the county's population were obese, with an additional 34.5% being overweight.

A substantial majority of residents (76.6 percent), last comparatively surveyed in 2001, rated their respective counties as good places to live. Over 81 percent of Riverside County residents indicated that their county is a very good or fairly good place to live, while about 72 percent of residents in San Bernardino County felt the same way. Survey respondents cited "nice living area", "good climate", and "affordable housing" as the top positive factors in assessing their respective communities. Smog was by far the most important negative factor affecting respondents' ratings in both counties, while traffic was the second highest concern in Riverside County and crime the second highest concern among San Bernardino County residents.

=== Politics ===
While the region as a whole had traditionally leaned more Republican than the rest of California, newer residents are less likely to identify with the Republican party than longer-term residents (36 percent to 42 percent), and the total number of residents identifying with the Democrats (34 percent) slightly edged over the number identifying with the Republican party (33 percent).

In the 2008 presidential election, Democratic candidate Barack Obama carried both Riverside and San Bernardino counties, becoming only the second Democrat to carry both counties since Lyndon Johnson in 1964. In 2012, Obama repeated this feat and again carried both counties, and the two Inland Empire counties stayed in the Democratic column until Donald Trump flipped them narrowly in 2024. The area continues to be far friendlier to Republicans than Los Angeles County or the San Francisco Bay Area.

Non-Hispanic Whites and non-Hispanic Blacks have the highest participation rates for nearly every type of political activity, while Latinos and Asian Americans lag significantly behind those groups in terms of volunteerism and organizational membership. The 2006 immigration protests have significantly boosted political participation among Latinos.

=== Religion ===
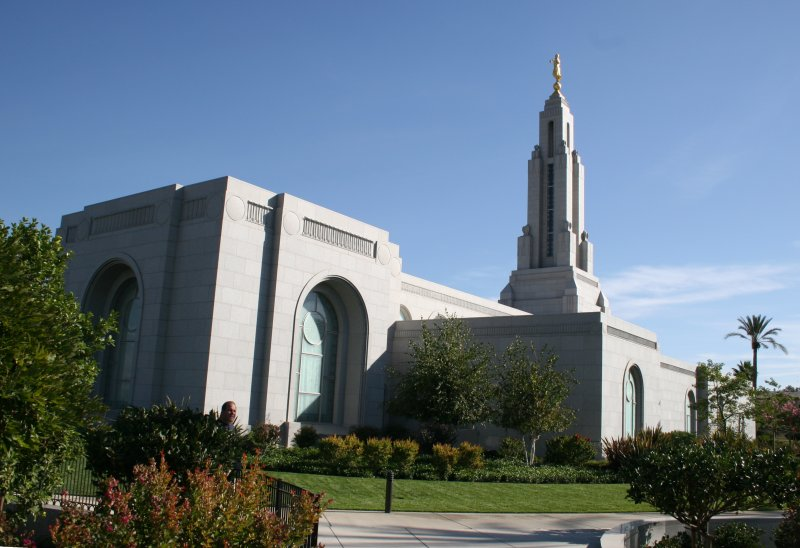
The Redlands California Temple is one of four LDS temples in Southern California.

Many faiths and denominations are found and represented in the area. The Roman Catholic parishes in the region belong to the church's Diocese of San Bernardino.

Seventh-day Adventists operate Loma Linda University.

The Inland Empire has a Jewish community, and additionally, a Jewish American community is in and around the Sun City neighborhood of Menifee. According to the United Jewish Citizens of the Desert, the Coachella Valley has an estimated 20,000 American Jews, one of California's largest Jewish communities, as a result of being a major retirement destination.

The Inland Empire has a Muslim community, the largest concentrations are Rancho Cucamonga, Riverside and Corona, close to California's largest Muslim community in Irvine (Orange County).

=== Crime ===
While the crime index in Riverside and Ontario trends slightly over the state average, San Bernardino has a crime index consistently near or over twice that of the national average. Reflecting nationwide trends, violent crime in the region overall declined or remained consistent in 2009, despite the recession. In the city of Riverside, 10 homicides occurred in 2005, down from 24 in 2003, its highest total since 2003. All but three cases resulted in arrests. In San Bernardino, by contrast, 58 killings occurred in 2005, but only a third of cases in San Bernardino led to arrests, due to a lack of witness cooperation in that city.

Latino gangs have been active in the region since the area's citrus days while a continual migration of numerous African American gangs from the inner city of South LA have flowed into the region since the Watts Riots and 1992 Los Angeles Riots. The increased diversity in the region between 1990 and 2000 is also associated with a 20 percent increase in hate crime in the same period, mostly ascribed to increased gang activity. According to data from the FBI's Uniform Crime Reporting program, taken together, Riverside and San Bernardino counties showed a total of 51,237 crimes reported to county police/sheriffs (but not to city or other agencies) in 2006; this combined total exceeded the totals for all other California counties – considered individually – except for Sacramento.

The region has also been noted as a center of methamphetamine drug production. The Riverside and San Bernardino county sheriffs' departments busted 635 meth labs in 2000; law enforcement has driven most of the meth production industry to Mexico since 2007, but many of the homes discovered to have been used as meth labs before 2006 have since been sold on the market before California law required rigorous decontamination, leading to a legacy of health hazards for unsuspecting renters and home-buyers in the area.

In 2016, federal crime statistics stated that San Bernardino was ranked the most dangerous city in California.

=== Education ===
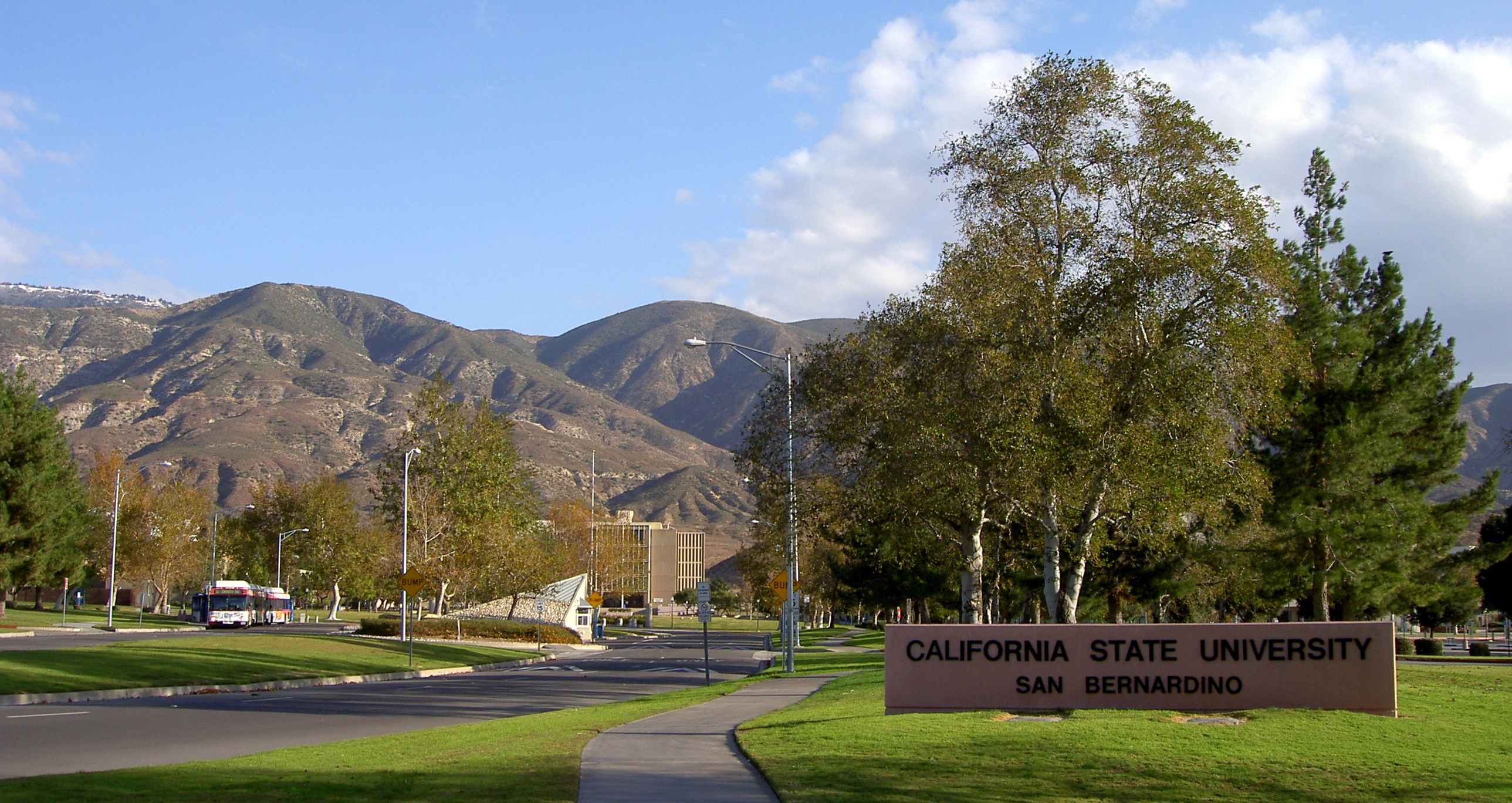
California State University, San Bernardino

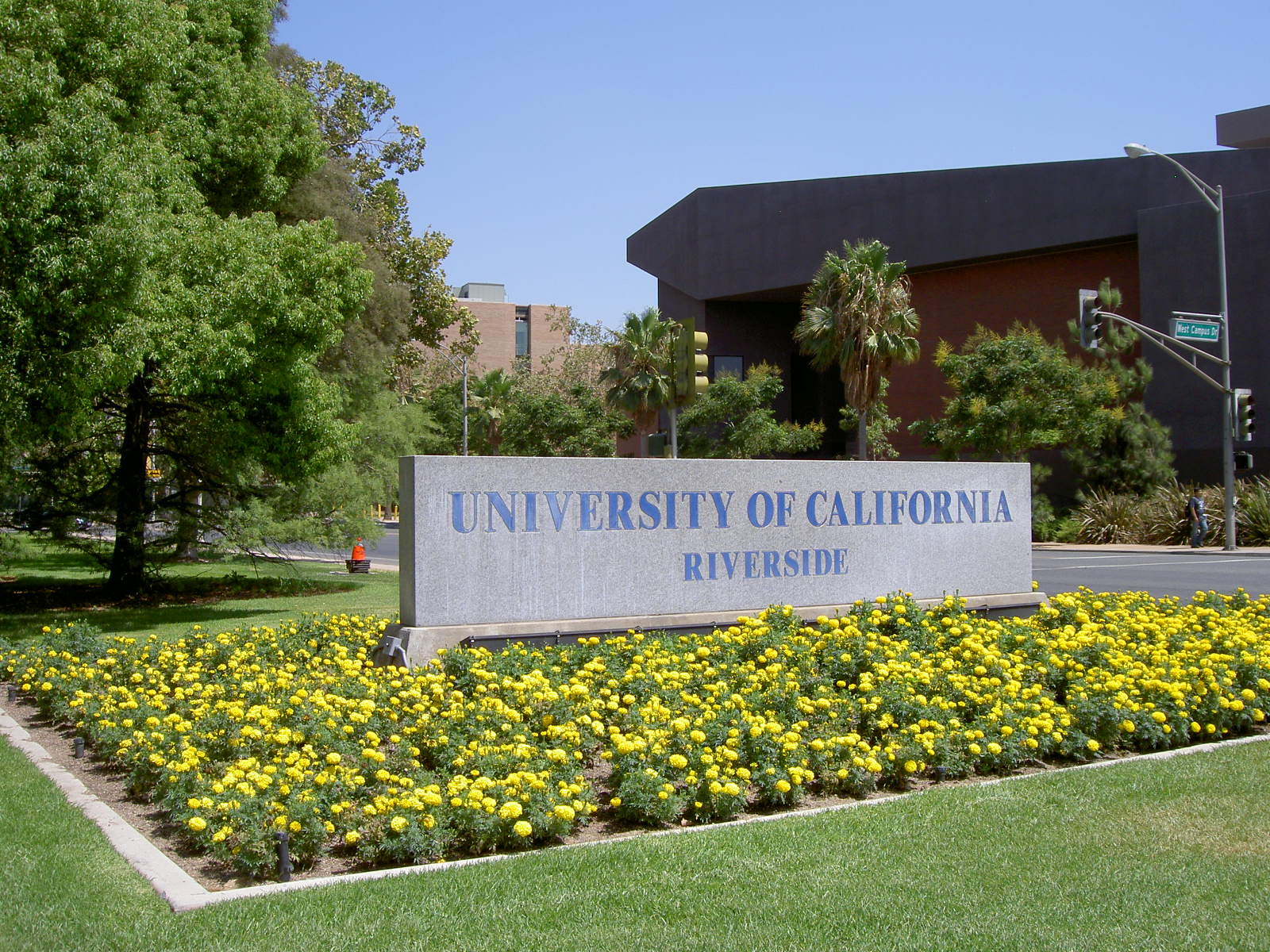
University of California, Riverside

There is a trend of lower educational attainment in the IE, which starts early. Only 37 percent of 3- and 4-year-olds in the region are enrolled in pre-school, with only one school in the region for every 343 children, as compared with 48 percent enrollment in San Diego County. Thirty-five percent of the IE's ninth graders do not graduate from high school, and only 37 percent of its college age residents enroll in a post-secondary education program of some sort. Only 24 percent of the IE's adult residents have attained a college degree or better. Twenty-five percent do not possess a high school diploma. According to past CSUSB President Al Karnig, "We have a very low college attendance rate that is scantly above half of what the average is in other states. We have only have about 20 percent college graduates in the Inland Empire while the average in other states is 38 percent." 21 inland area high schools rank in the top 100 in California for producing dropouts.

Of Inland Empire residents 25 years and over in 2004, 44.4 percent of Asians had bachelor's or higher degrees, and nearly 70 percent had at least attended college. 21.3 percent of Blacks had a bachelor's degree or higher, and 65.2 percent had either a community degree or had attended college. 22.8 percent of Whites had a bachelor's degree or higher, and 60.8 percent had attended college. Of Hispanics, 6.9 percent had a bachelor's or higher degree, and 30.2 percent attended college.

Among students transferring from Inland community colleges to private schools in 2004–05, the most frequent choice was the University of Phoenix.

=== Employment ===
While the Inland Empire led the state in job-growth with 275,000 new jobs between 1990 and 2000, most are in comparatively low-tech fields. San Bernardino and Riverside counties are primarily host to service and manufacturing- or warehousing-oriented industries. Food and administrative services employ the most people in the Inland Empire, while for the state of California, the top industries are in administrative services and professional, scientific and hi-tech-oriented fields. 79.8% of the IE's job growth from 1990 to 2003 was in service-sector jobs. Low-wage industries are abundant in the IE, and the area's high-tech and professional industries pay less than in other regions of California. As many as one-third of working adults commute out of the 27,000-square-mile (70,000 km^{2}) region to find work, the highest proportion of any area in the country. Adding to gridlock, fewer than 5% of the IE's 1,249,224 working-age residents use public transportation to get to work each day. 14.5% carpool, while 79.7% typically drive alone to work in their cars.

In 2007, the region had an unemployment rate of 6.1%, while overall jobless claims in California were at 5.4% and 4.4% nationally. In 2008, unemployment in the area increased to 9.5%, at a time when the state average was 8.2% and the national average approximately 6.5%. Unemployment reached an all-time high of 15% in 2010, second in the nation only to Detroit among metropolitan areas with populations over 1 million.

County	2016 estimate	2010 census	Change	Area	Density
Riverside County, California	2,387,741	2,189,641	+9.05%	7,206.47 sq mi (18,664.7 km^{2})	331/sq mi (128/km^{2})
San Bernardino County, California	2,140,096	2,035,210	+5.15%	20,056.92 sq mi (51,947.2 km^{2})	107/sq mi (41/km^{2})
Total	4,527,837	4,224,851	+7.17%	27,263.39 sq mi (70,611.9 km^{2})	166/sq mi (64/km^{2})

== Culture ==
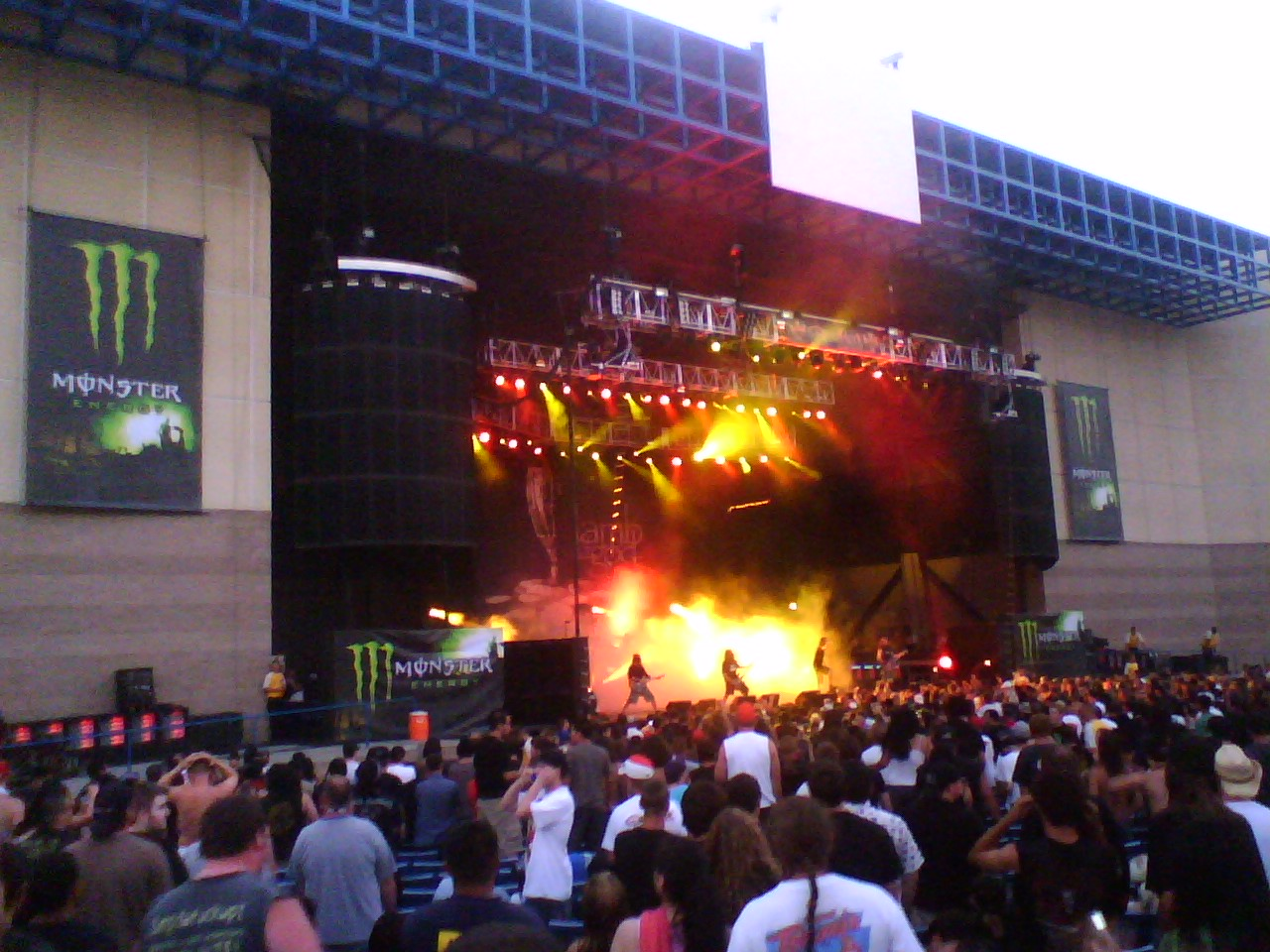
Lamb of God playing at Ozzfest at the San Manuel Amphitheater in Devore, San Bernardino, 2007

The Inland Empire sits adjacent to the San Bernardino Mountains. Lake Arrowhead and Big Bear are just some of the lakes located in the mountains. Lake Arrowhead becomes very popular in the summertime, while Big Bear becomes popular in the winter for skiing and snowboarding activities. Various locations in the Inland Empire provide venues for cultural performances and entertainment. The Victoria Gardens Cultural Center, which is owned and operated by the City of Rancho Cucamonga, opened in the Fall of 2006 providing theatre, concerts and family entertainment to the region. The San Manuel Amphitheater in San Bernardino's Devore neighborhood is the nation's largest outdoor amphitheater. San Bernardino's "Route 66 Rendezvous (the largest classical carshow in the US)", an annual street fair and classic car show, draws a half-million people from around the world. The Palm Springs Aerial Tramway in Palm Springs is a popular attraction, rising to more than 8500 feet.

=== Music ===
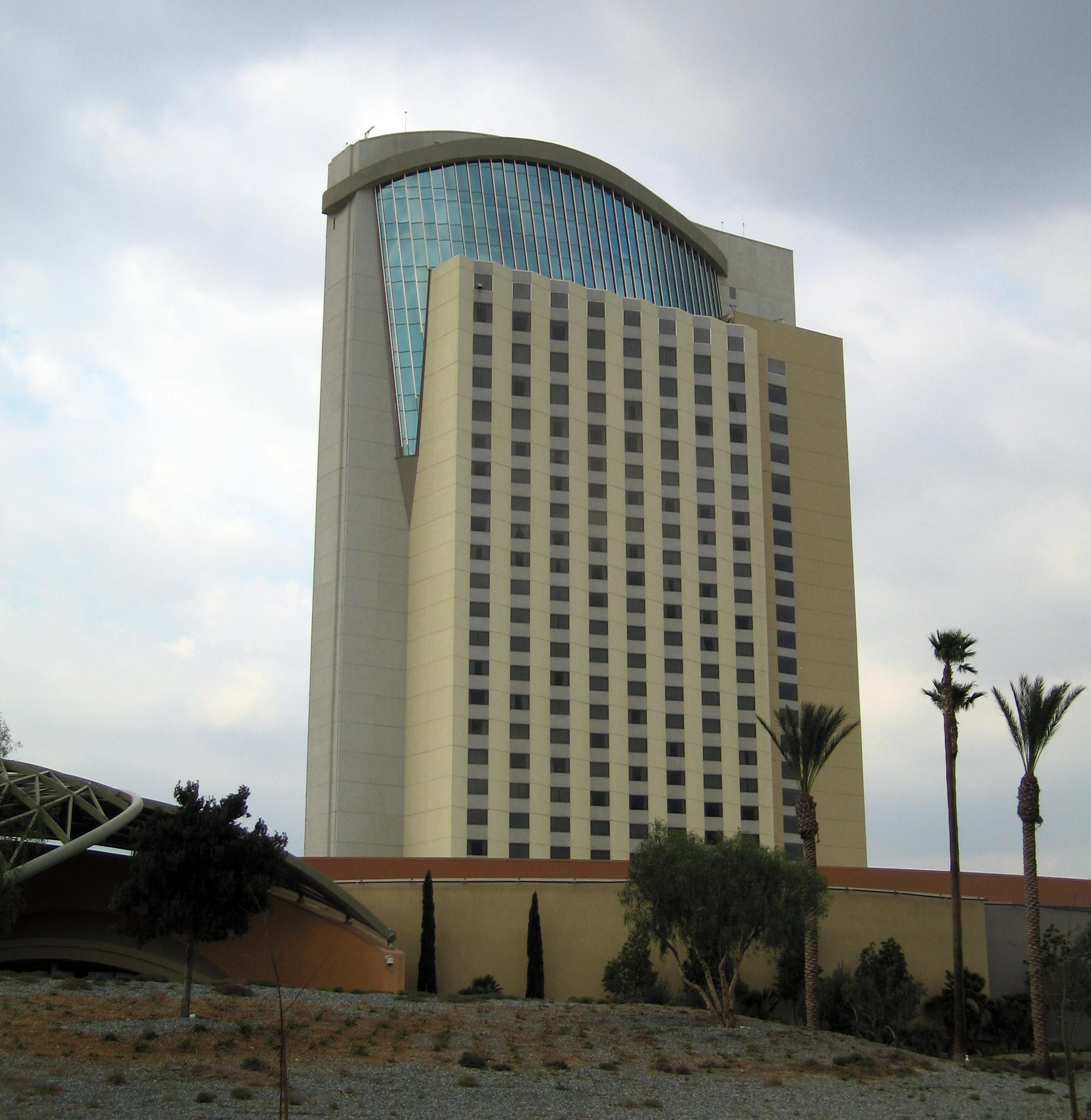
At 330 feet (100 m) high, the Morongo Casino, Resort & Spa tower is the tallest building in the Inland Empire. Concerts and events are booked inside.

Established bands from the IE include Alien Ant Farm, Hepcat, The Bellrays, and the Voodoo Glow Skulls, from Riverside, and Cracker from Redlands, and The Mountain Goats from Chino. House music artist DJ Lynnwood got his start at the age of ten spinning records at KUOR-FM in Redlands. Local hip-hop artists such as Suga Free, Saint Dog, 40 Glocc, Young Noble from the Outlawz, J.J. Fad, Noa James, Lil Xan and A Lighter Shade of Brown have brought about attention to the growing Hip hop community in and around the region. The Jerkin' street dance culture originated from the Inland Empire-based hip-hop groups New Boyz and Audio Push. A number of artists associated with the Palm Desert Scene forged the genre of desert rock, as well as playing a large role in the genre of stoner rock. A Danish record label, Musikministeriet, recently opened up an office in Redlands in hopes of further cultivating the IE music scene.

Frank Zappa performed in Upland on Foothill Boulevard during the early 1960s, where he played shows on a makeshift stage for college crowds. Zappa also purchased Pal Recording Studio on Archibald Avenue in Rancho Cucamonga, where the Surfaris had recorded the surf music classic "Wipe Out". He dubbed it Studio Z and began making recordings that eventually led to the founding of Zappa's group The Mothers of Invention. Until his death in December 2012, singer Ray Collins of the Mothers of Invention lived in the area. Zappa mentions the Inland Empire in the song "Billy the Mountain".

From the late 80s until the late 90s, many up-and-coming musical acts, such as Rage Against the Machine, Blink-182 and No Doubt cut their teeth playing venues in Riverside. These historic venues (Spanky's Cafe and the De Anza Theatre) have since been closed and converted to other purposes.

=== Performing arts ===
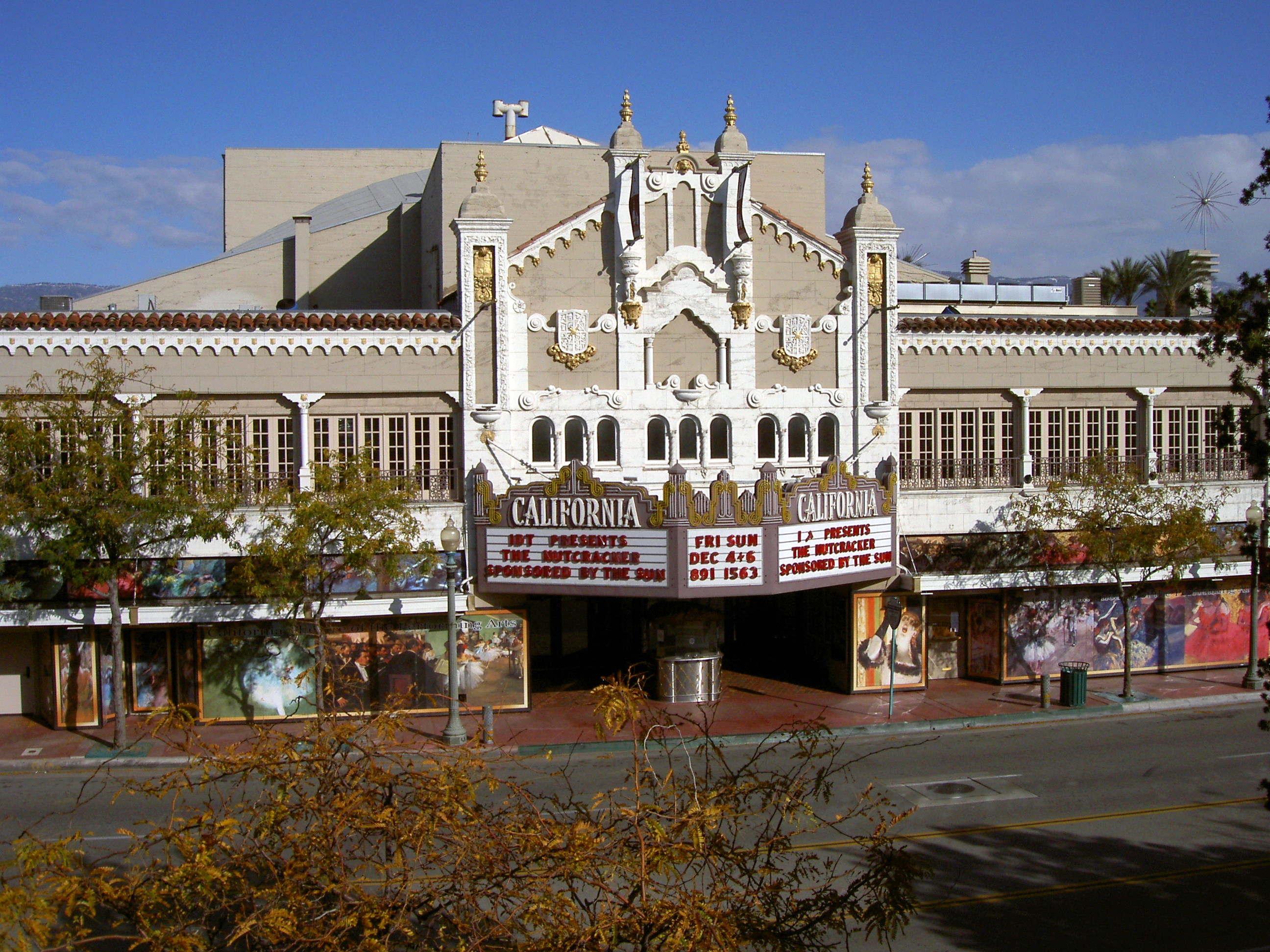
California Theatre in downtown San Bernardino

Orchestras in the IE include the Redlands Symphony, which performs at the University of Redlands, the Riverside County Philharmonic, which performs at the Riverside Municipal Auditorium, the San Bernardino Symphony, which performs at the California Theatre, and the Victor Valley Symphony, which performs at Victor Valley College. Theatrical Arts International is housed at the California Theatre as well. With the largest subscriber base in the Inland Empire, Theatrical Arts International presents the largest caliber tours available, including such blockbusters as Cats, Hairspray, Mamma Mia, and Miss Saigon. There are many other large theater programs in the community. The Riverside Fox Theater, also known as the Fox Performing Arts Center, was built in 1929 and is a Spanish Colonial Revival style building in the heart of downtown Riverside, California. The theater is the centerpiece of Riverside's Arts & Culture initiative and underwent a major renovation and restoration to become a regional performing arts facility. Renovation was completed in the Fall 2009, with a grand reopening in January 2010. At Chaffey High School in Ontario, they have a very large theater program that puts on shows in the fall and in the spring on one of the largest high school stages in the Inland Empire. The Inland Empire Harmony Carousel Chorus provides music in Barbershop Quartet productions.

=== Sports ===
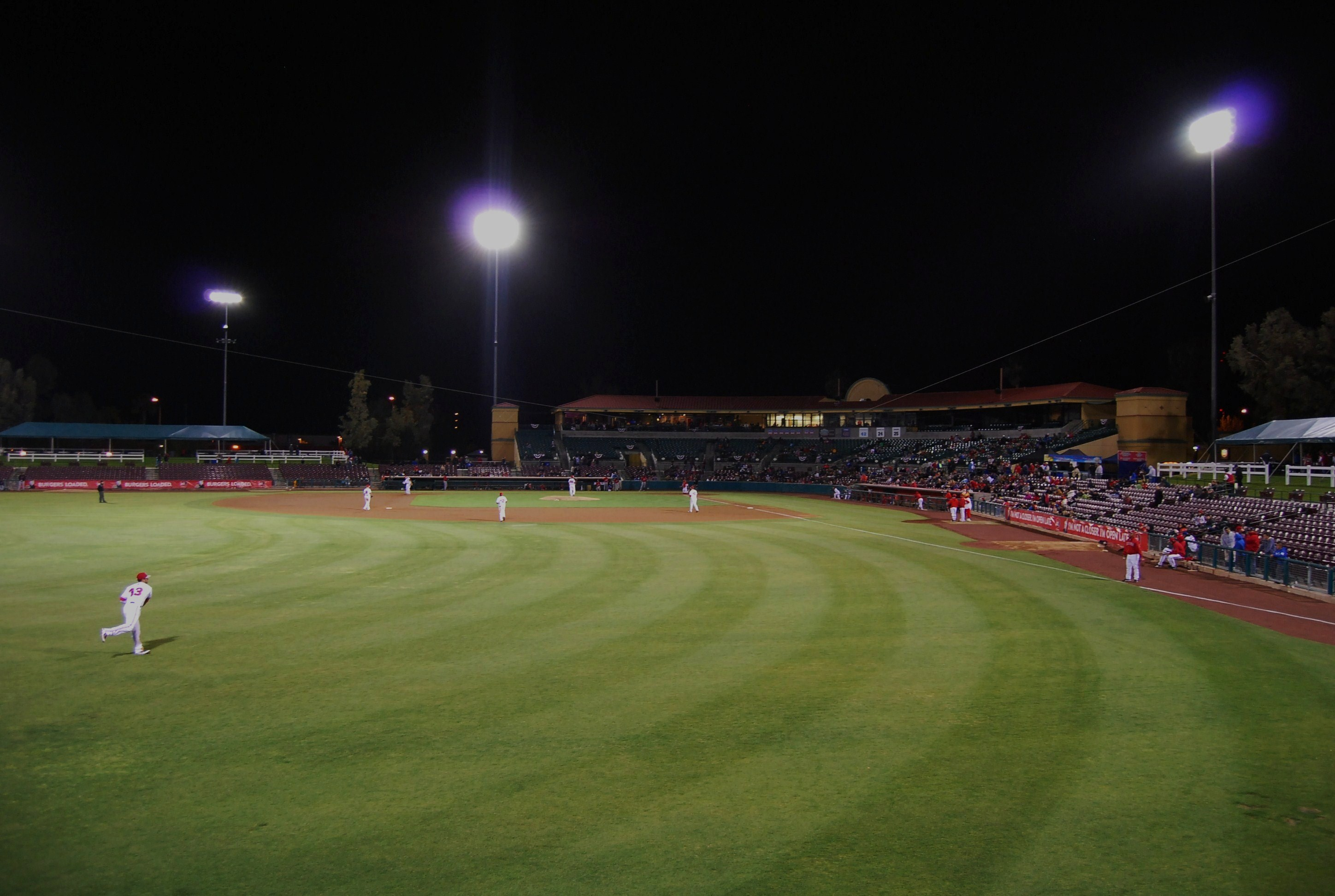
Inland Empire 66ers playing at San Manuel Stadium in downtown San Bernardino

The Inland Empire is the largest metropolitan area in the United States without a major professional sports team. However, it is part of the Greater Los Angeles area which includes teams in Los Angeles and Orange counties. The area is home to numerous minor league baseball, basketball, and ice hockey teams. The Inland Empire team with the most championships is the Inland Empire 66ers of San Bernardino, who won their most recent championship in 2013.

The Auto Club Speedway, located in Fontana, opened in 1997. It contains an oval, a road course, and a dragstrip for auto racing. The Speedway is located approximately 2 miles (3.2 km) from the former Ontario Motor Speedway site, the latter of which is currently the site of the Toyota Arena. The Riverside International Raceway, another defunct motorsport venue, was located about 7 miles (11 km) east of Riverside.

Club	League	Sport	Venue	Founded	Titles
Inland Empire 66ers	California League	Baseball	San Manuel Stadium	1941	6
Lake Elsinore Storm	California League	Baseball	Lake Elsinore Diamond	1994	2
Ontario Tower Buzzers	California League	Baseball	ONT Field	2026	0
Rancho Cucamonga Quakes	California League	Baseball	LoanMart Field	1993	1
Coachella Valley Lakers	NBA G League	Basketball	Acrisure Arena	2026	0
Coachella Valley Firebirds	American Hockey League	Ice hockey	Acrisure Arena	2022	0
Ontario Reign	American Hockey League	Ice hockey	Toyota Arena	2015	0
Empire Strykers	MASL	Indoor soccer	Toyota Arena	2013	0
Redlands FC	USL2	Soccer	Dodge Stadium	2022	0

In college sports, the Inland Empire features five four-year institutions that represent all three NCAA divisions, as well as the NAIA.

Program	School	Location	Division	Main conference
California Baptist Lancers	California Baptist University	Riverside	NCAA Division I	Big West Conference
UC Riverside Highlanders	University of California, Riverside	Riverside	NCAA Division I	Big West Conference
Cal State San Bernardino Coyotes	California State University, San Bernardino	San Bernardino	NCAA Division II	California Collegiate Athletic Association
Redlands Bulldogs	University of Redlands	Redlands	NCAA Division III	Southern California Intercollegiate Athletic Conference
La Sierra Golden Eagles	La Sierra University	Riverside	NAIA	California Pacific Conference

=== Media ===
==== Newspapers ====
The Inland Empire is served by four major local newspapers:

- The InlandEmpirePress.com provides online only reporting for the Riverside County & San Bernardino Valley region.
- The San Bernardino County Sun, which serves primarily the San Bernardino Valley region.
- The Inland Valley Daily Bulletin, which serves the southwestern San Bernardino County and eastern Los Angeles County cities of Claremont, La Verne, Pomona, San Dimas, Upland, Rancho Cucamonga, Ontario, Montclair, Chino and Chino Hills.
- The Riverside-based Press-Enterprise also has a few editions over the area.

There is also an Inland Empire edition of the Los Angeles Times. For the segments of the Inland Empire surrounding San Bernardino and Riverside cities, regional newspapers include:

- Inland Empire: The Inland Empire Community News, provides online and print reporting for various cities in the Inland Empire.
- High Desert: the Victor Valley is served by both the Victor Valley News and the Daily Press. Other newspapers include the Antelope Valley Press, and the Barstow Desert Dispatch. Both Victorville and Barstow have a Sunday edition circulated across both areas called the Press-Dispatch.
- Palm Springs & Coachella Valley: The Desert Sun

==== Radio ====
The Inland Empire is ranked 26th (June 2008) in the national radio market as a stand-alone market. When combined with the Greater Los Angeles Area, it is part of the second largest radio market.

Format stations	Public and college	Talk radio
KOLA-FM 99.9 Classics	KVCR-FM 91.9 NPR	KCAA-AM 1050 NBC Radio
KFRG-FM 95.1 Country	KUCR-FM 88.3 UC Riverside	KTIE-AM 590 Conservative talk
KHTI-FM 103.9 Adult Top 40		
KCAL-FM 96.7 Rock	KUOR-FM 89.1 NPR	KMET-AM 1490 Conservative
KGGI-FM 99.1 Hip-Hop/R&B		
KLRD-FM 90.1 Christian contemporary		

Due to the various mountain ranges including San Bernardino, San Gabriel, and Idyllwild, it may be difficult to receive a single station throughout the entire Inland Empire area without interference.

==== Television ====
PBS member station KVCR-TV broadcasts directly to the Inland Empire. The station covers all of Riverside County and San Bernardino County with some Los Angeles area overlap. The station is located on the campus of San Bernardino Valley College. In addition to PBS and original, local content, First Nations Experience (FNX), KVCR's sister station, also broadcasts programming about the indigenous peoples and Native Americans to the Inland Empire.

The current TLC TV series Dr. Pimple Popper, a spin-off of the YouTube channel of dermatologist Sandra Lee, is shot mainly at Skin Physicians & Surgeons, a clinic in Upland run by Lee and her husband Jeffrey Rebish, also a dermatologist.

==== Film ====
While there are no large film production companies or studios based in the Inland Empire, on-location shoots accounted for a total economic impact of $65.2 million in the two-county region in 2006. From 1994 to 2005, filming accounted for over a billion dollars ($1,228,977,456) in total revenues spent in the area. Some famous films shot in the Inland Empire include Executive Decision, U Turn, Erin Brockovich, and The Fast and the Furious. Select scenes from the films Tough Guys, Constantine, The Island, and Tenet were also shot in the Inland Empire's ghost town of Eagle Mountain.

While the 2006 David Lynch film Inland Empire is named after the region, no scenes were shot in the Inland Empire.

Ann Lerner, Albuquerque's film liaison, told the L.A. Times about the AMC cable television series Breaking Bad producers wanted to film in the Inland Empire but switched to New Mexico because of their tax incentives.

Shot Caller (2017) has scenes set in the Inland Empire, called "I.E." in the film.

== Incorporated cities ==
=== Riverside County ===
Riverside County cities	Year incorporated	Population, 2020	Median income, 2018
Banning	1913	31,125	$41,038
Beaumont	1912	51,475	$78,111
Blythe	1916	19,255	$43,141
Calimesa	1990	9,329	$53,366
Canyon Lake	1990	11,000	$97,237
Cathedral City	1981	53,580	$46,370
Coachella	1946	47,186	$33,870
Corona	1896	168,248	$86,790
Desert Hot Springs	1963	29,660	$34,814
Eastvale	2010	66,413	$114,230
Hemet	1910	85,175	$39,653
Indian Wells	1967	5,403	$104,522
Indio	1930	90,751	$74,774
Jurupa Valley	2011	107,083	$76,090
La Quinta	1982	40,660	$79,889
Lake Elsinore	1888	63,453	$77,090
Menifee	2008	97,093	$77,033
Moreno Valley	1984	208,838	$65,449
Murrieta	1991	115,561	$100,080
Norco	1964	27,564	$95,441
Palm Desert	1973	52,986	$57,578
Palm Springs	1938	47,427	$50,361
Perris	1911	80,201	$66,545
Rancho Mirage	1973	19,114	$71,227
Riverside	1883	328,155	$71,967
San Jacinto	1888	51,028	$50,483
Temecula	1989	111,970	$95,918
Wildomar	2008	37,183	$73,282

=== San Bernardino County ===
San Bernardino County cities	Year incorporated	Population, 2020	Median income, 2018
Adelanto	1970	35,663	$40,018
Apple Valley	1988	74,394	$51,314
Barstow	1947	24,268	$39,585
Big Bear Lake	1981	5,206	$51,014
Chino	1910	89,109	$87,090
Chino Hills	1991	82,409	$103,473
Colton	1887	54,118	$50,063
Fontana	1952	213,000	$80,800
Grand Terrace	1978	12,426	$66,912
Hesperia	1988	96,393	$50,271
Highland	1987	55,323	$59,395
Loma Linda	1970	24,535	$53,371
Montclair	1956	39,490	$58,012
Needles	1913	5,248	$31,843
Ontario	1891	182,871	$75,266
Rancho Cucamonga	1977	175,522	$92,773
Redlands	1888	70,952	$72,410
Rialto	1911	104,553	$70,188
San Bernardino	1854	217,946	$49,721
Twentynine Palms	1987	29,258	$41,668
Upland	1906	78,814	$82,426
Victorville	1962	126,432	$60,391
Yucaipa	1989	55,712	$63,657
Yucca Valley	1991	22,236	$45,277

== See also ==
- List of California urban areas
- List of museums in the Inland Empire
