= VGCC =

VGCC may refer to:

- Voltage-gated calcium channel, also known as a voltage-dependent calcium channel
- Vance-Granville Community College, a community college in North Carolina
- Victoria Gardens Cultural Center, a community library and performance venue in Rancho Cucamonga, California
- Video Game Collectors Community, an online community for video game collectors vgcc.ca
