= Victoria Gardens (Rancho Cucamonga) =

- Location: Rancho Cucamonga, California
- Coordinates: 34°06′39″N 117°31′59″W
- Opened: October 28, 2004; 22 years ago
- Manager: Brookfield Properties
- Owner: Redwood West
- Num. of stores: 180
- Num. of anchor tenants: 3
- Website: victoriagardensie.com

Victoria Gardens is a 147-acre (0.59 km^{2}) lifestyle center in Rancho Cucamonga, California, designed to be the downtown center for the City of Rancho Cucamonga.

== Components and events ==
The complex comprises not only department stores, shops, restaurants, and movie theaters, but also a performing arts center, a library, 55,000 square feet (5,100 m^{2}) of office space, and 500 residential units.

Retail anchors are JCPenney, Macy's Men's, Children's, and Home store, a separate Macy's store with the remaining departments, and Bass Pro Shops.

Mall features a food court with various vendors like Sbarro, Mongolian BBQ and Panda Express. It also offers sit-down dining options including Cheesecake Factory, Yard House, Lucilee's Smokehouse Bar-B-Que.

The Victoria Gardens Cultural Center, which features the Rancho Cucamonga Public Library, a performing arts center, and a multi-use reception hall, is owned and operated by the city of Rancho Cucamonga and sits north of the shopping center between the two parking structures.

There are events throughout the year such as the tree lighting and Santa during the holiday season, farmer’s markets, and car shows. Victoria Gardens is the home of the first Bass Pro Shops location in California.

== History ==
The center opened on October 28, 2004, with JCPenney, Macy's, and Robinsons-May (now the Macy's Men's, Children's, and Home store) as the anchors.

The mall increased the city's sales tax income by 44% in its first year of operation.

In 2006, the former Robinsons-May store was converted to a Macy's Men's and Home Store to complement the existing Macy's.

Victoria Gardens is owned by Redwood West.

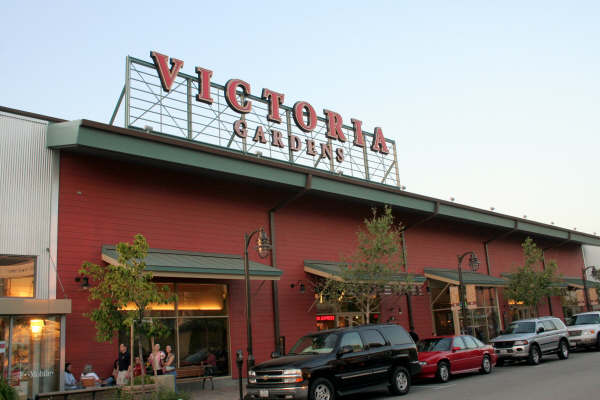

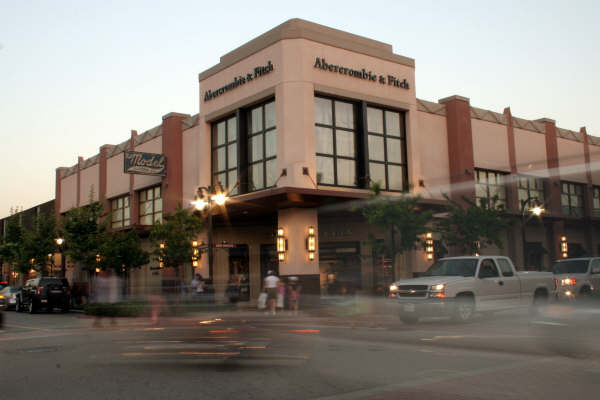
