= Victoria Gardens Cultural Center =

Cultural center in Rancho Cucamonga, California, U.S.

Coordinates: 34°6′46.25″N 117°31′57.62″W

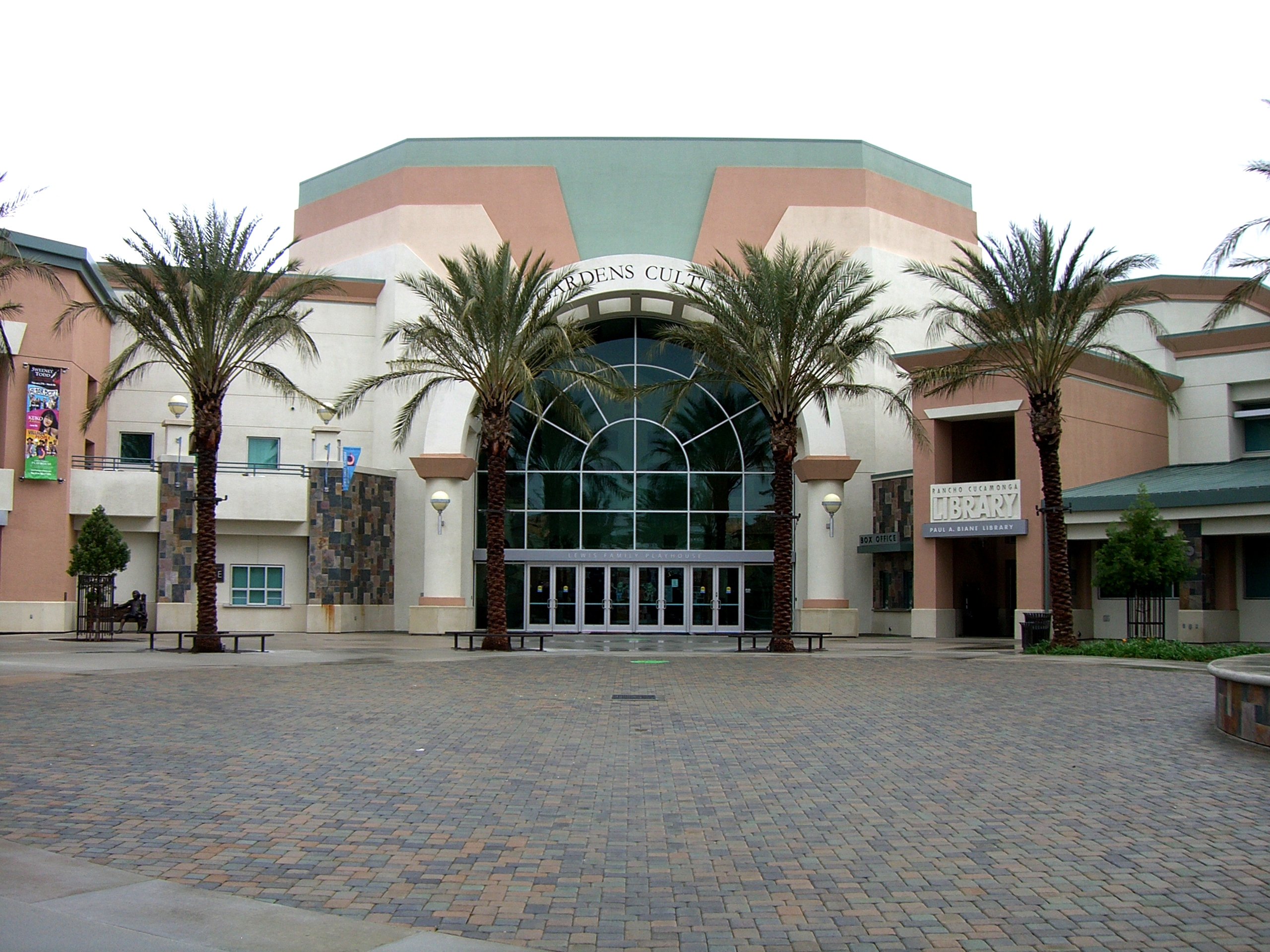
The Victoria Gardens Cultural Center's "Imagination Courtyard"

The Victoria Gardens Cultural Center (VGCC) is a community library and performance venue attached to the Victoria Gardens lifestyle center in Rancho Cucamonga, California. The building (which links the Lewis Family Playhouse, the Paul A. Biane Library, and the 4,500-square-foot (420 m^{2}) Celebration Hall under one roof) officially opened on August 19, 2006. It is supported in part by The Rancho Cucamonga Library Foundation and the Rancho Cucamonga Community Foundation. These two organizations joined together in 2002 to create the Promoting Arts and Literacy (PAL) fundraising campaign. Since then these two groups have continued to hold their annual fundraising events: the Rancho Cucamonga Public Library Telethon and the Community Foundation Gala for the sole benefit of the PAL campaign.

The $33.8 million project was completed without the use of any City of Rancho Cucamonga's General Fund. It was instead financed through a $7.8 million State Library Grant, $5.7 million partnership with Victoria Gardens regional town center developer Forest City Enterprises, private partnerships, Community Development Block Grant funds, and Redevelopment Agency Tax Allocation Bond Funds.

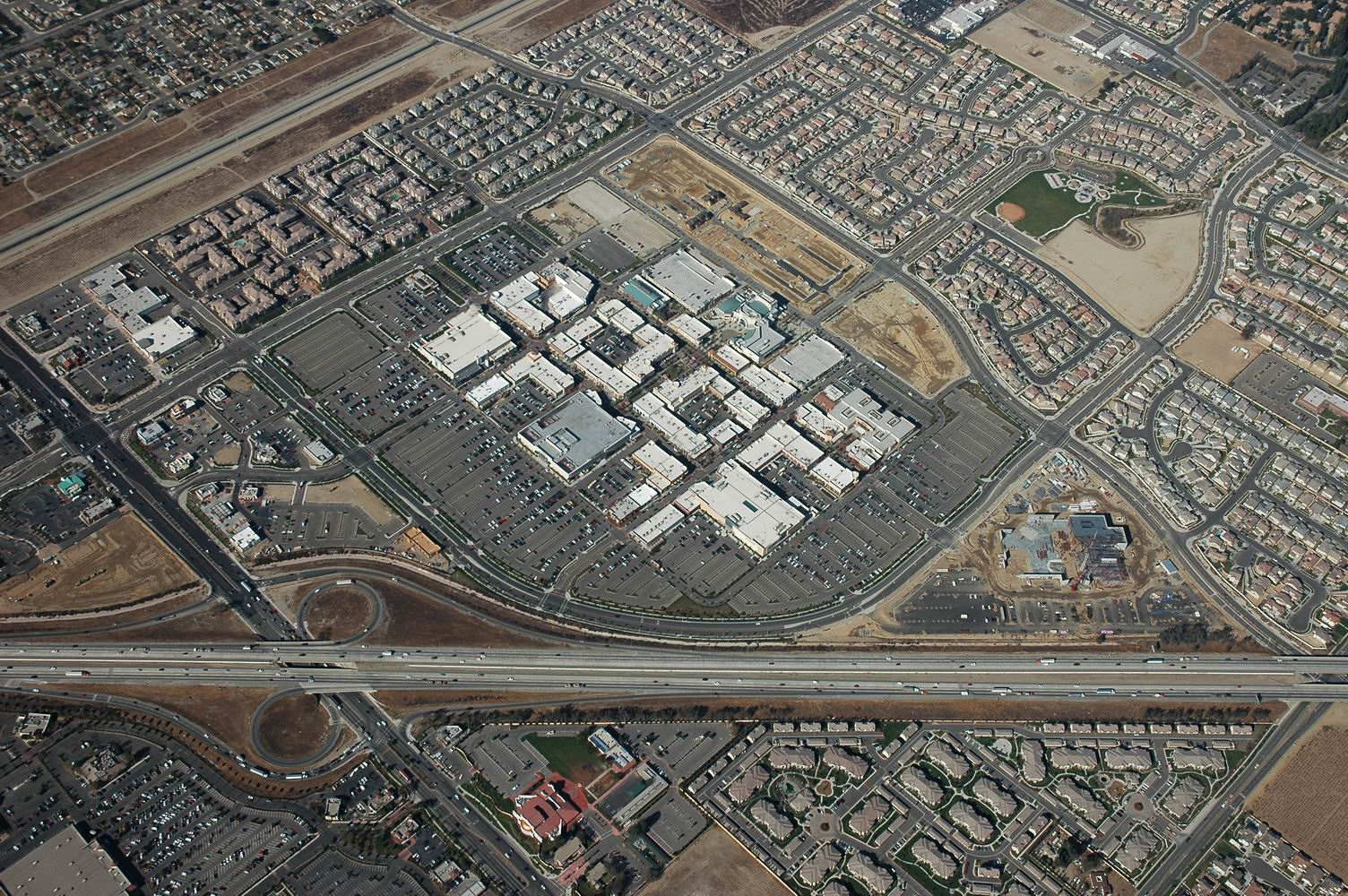
Aerial photo of the Victoria Gardens Mall and the adjacent Cultural Center

== Lewis Family Playhouse ==
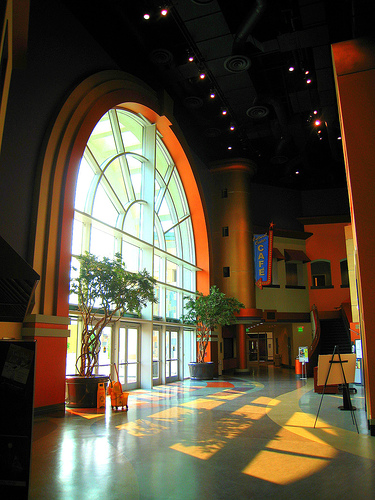
The Lewis Family Playhouse Lobby.

Lewis Family Playhouse is a city-owned and operated performing arts center in the city of Rancho Cucamonga, California. The Playhouse is somewhat unique in that 65 percent of its shows are also owned, operated and produced by the city.

=== Resident theatre companies ===
The resident companies which are owned and operated by the city, include the following:

- The MainStreet Theatre Company is an Equity theater company producing theatrical productions, especially for children and families. Previous shows included Ferdinand the Bull, Suessical, James and the Giant Peach and If You Give a Mouse a Cookie.
- The Rancho Cucamonga Community Theatre program is designed to provide a quality learning and performance experience for youth, teens, and adults in the community. Previous shows include A Christmas Carol, Oliver! and Steel Magnolias.
- Broadway at the Gardens presents a single high quality, high tech, high energy musical theatre production each year. Their premiere production was Sweeney Todd in 2009.
- The Black Box Productions are presented in the Studio Theatre and offer more intimate, more dramatic works. Shows include The Diary of Adam & Eve and Proof.

== Paul A. Biane Library ==
The Paul A Biane Library opened alongside the Lewis Family Playhouse with the Victoria Gardens Cultural center in August 2006. The building was named after San Bernardino County Supervisor Paul Biane, who helped secure more than $1 million USD in tax money to build the library. There have been talks to expand the Biane Library, which has 14,000 square feet (1,300 m^{2}) of space on the second floor that is not utilized. The proposed concept for the space is a children's center.

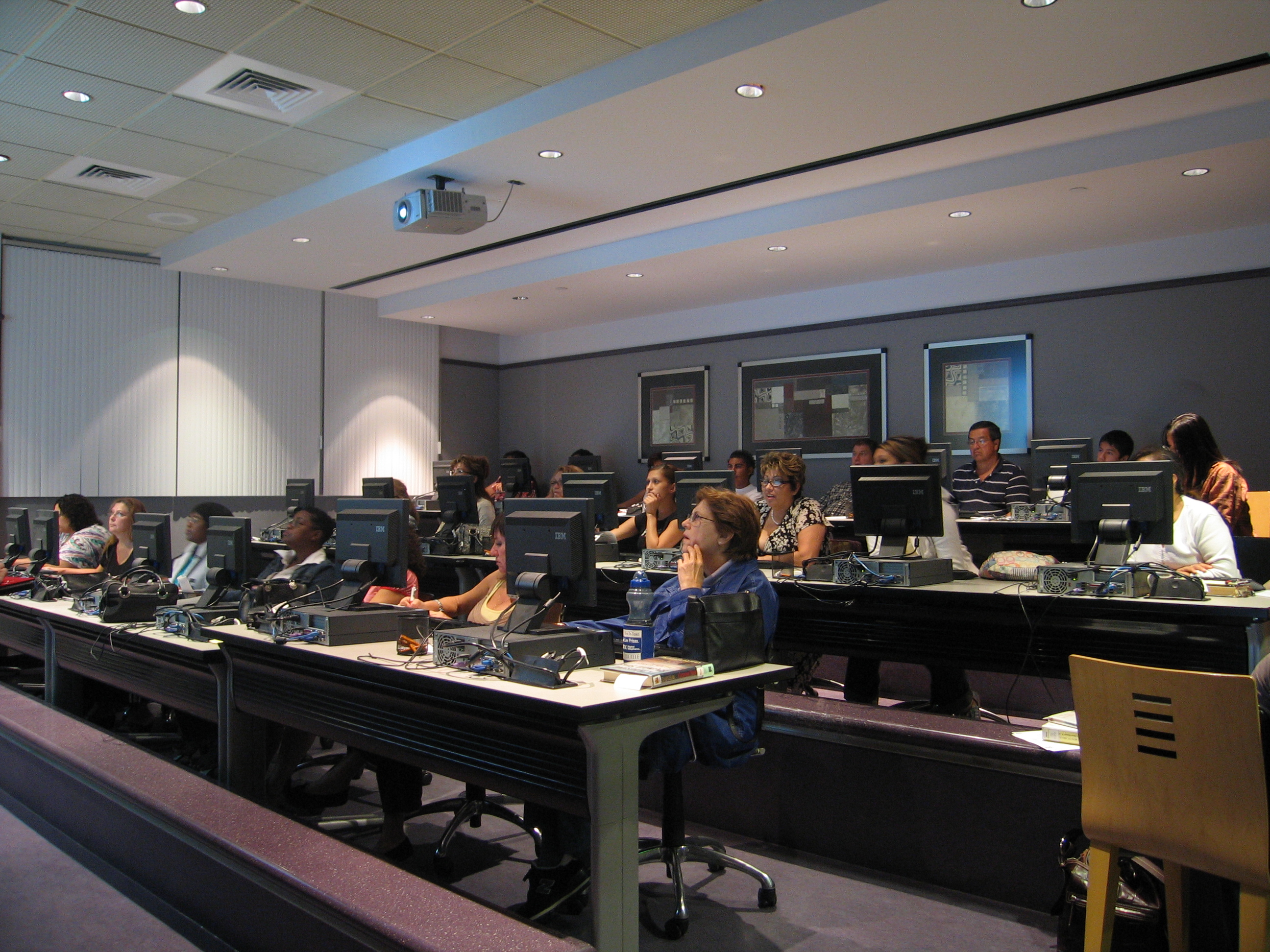
The tech center.

The Library features a somewhat large (21 computer) technology center, five study rooms available for public use that accommodate anywhere from two to six people, a quiet reading room, a 'Boutique Bookstore' and free wireless internet provided by the city of Rancho Cucamonga. The library also has a wide variety of programs designed especially for children and adults. They also occasionally team up with the Lewis Family Playhouse to put on events that use the 4,500-square-foot (420 m^{2}) Celebration Hall rental facility, The Lewis Family Playhouse, the Imagination Courtyard and the library itself.

== Celebration Hall ==
Celebration Hall is a 4,500-square-foot (420 m^{2}) facility with the flexibility of sectioning the hall in up to three rooms. Its main function is to serve as a multi-purpose room with full kitchen amenities and audio/visual capabilities. Patrons can utilize the space for anything from business meetings to wedding receptions.
