= Claremont station (California) =

Rail and bus station in Claremont, California, US

Claremont
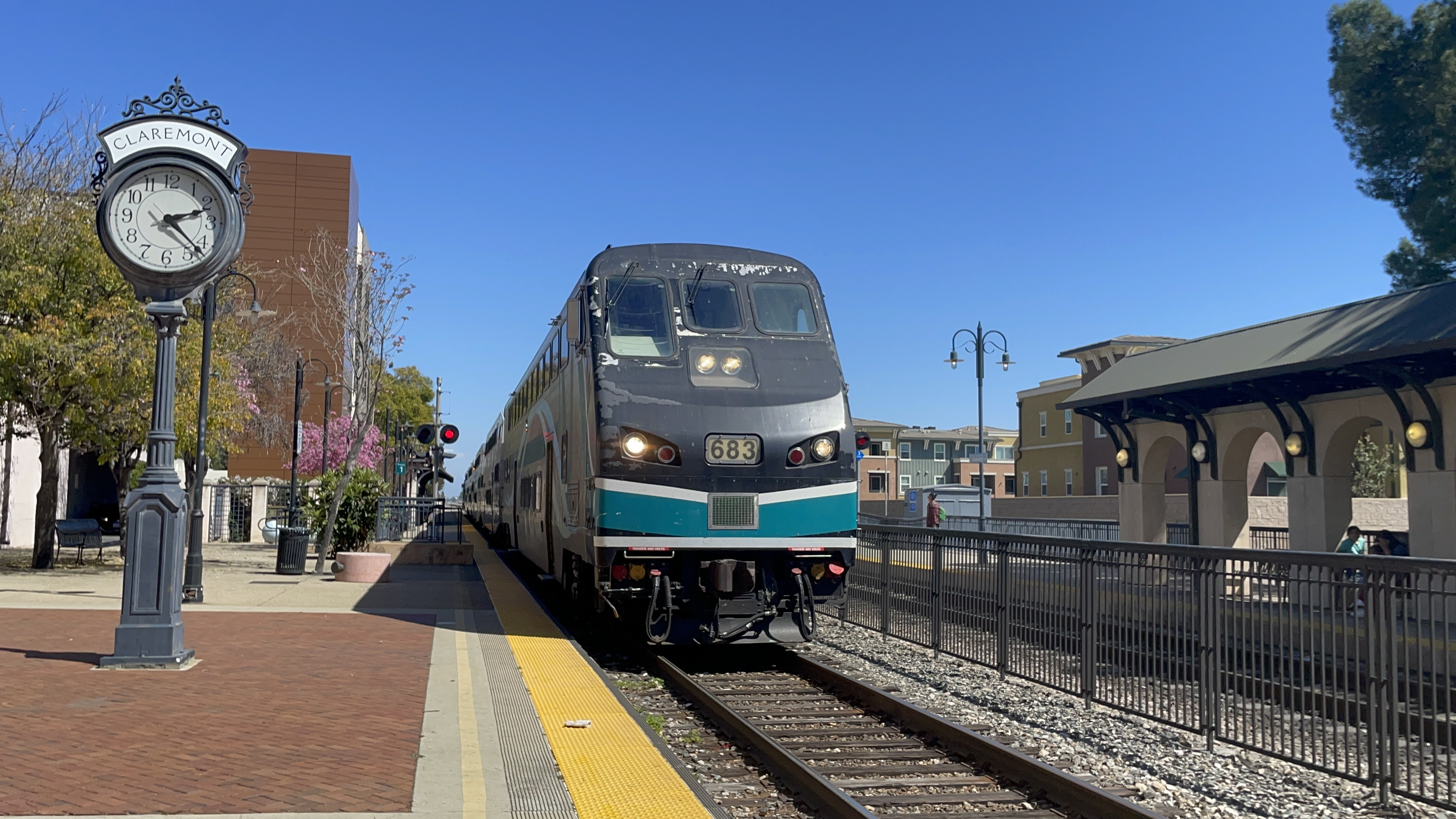
- A westbound train at Claremont station in 2025

General information
- Location: 110 West 1st Street; Claremont, California
- Coordinates: 34.0941°N 117.7168°W
- Line: SCRRA San Gabriel Subdivision
- Platforms: 2 side platforms
- Tracks: 2
- Connections: Foothill Transit: 188, 197, 292, 480, 492; Amtrak Thruway: 19

Construction
- Parking: 396 spaces, 16 accessible spaces
- Accessible: Yes

Other information
- Station code: Amtrak: CLM

History
- Opened: 1927
- Rebuilt: December 7, 1992

Passengers
- FY 2026: 238 (avg. wkdy boardings)

Services
Preceding station	Metrolink	Following station
Pomona–North toward L.A. Union Station	San Bernardino Line	Montclair toward San Bernardino or Redlands
Former services
Preceding station	Atchison, Topeka and Santa Fe Railway	Following station
Pomona toward Los Angeles	Main Line Via Pasadena, Pomona	Upland toward Chicago
Preceding station	Pacific Electric	Following station
Baldy View toward Pacific Electric Building	Upland–San Bernardino (discontinued 1940)	West Upland toward San Bernardino
Baldy View toward Pacific Electric Building	Riverside–Rialto (discontinued 1940)	West Upland toward Riverside
Baldy View toward Pomona	Pomona–Claremont (discontinued 1932)	Terminus
Baldy View toward Pomona	Pomona–Claremont (discontinued 1932)	West Upland (rush hour service) toward Upland
- Atchison, Topeka and Santa Fe Railroad Station
- U.S. National Register of Historic Places
- Location: Claremont, California
- Coordinates: 34°5′38.76″N 117°43′0.48″W
- Built: 1927
- Architect: Atchison, Topeka and Santa Fe Railroad and Sumner Sellit Co.
- Architectural style: Mission Revival-Spanish Colonial Revival
- NRHP reference No.: 82002188
- Added to NRHP: July 15, 1982
Location

Claremont station is a passenger rail and bus station in Claremont, California, United States. It is served by Metrolink's San Bernardino Line which runs from Los Angeles Union Station to San Bernardino–Downtown. The Mission Revival-Spanish Colonial Revival style station is listed on the U.S. National Register of Historic Places as Atchison, Topeka and Santa Fe Railroad Station.

The Claremont station is served by 32 Metrolink San Bernardino Line trains (16 in each direction) on weekdays, between 4:30 a.m. and 10:45 p.m. Weekend train service is less: 16 trains (8 in each direction), on Saturdays and Sundays between 7:21 a.m. and 10:36 p.m.

An extension of the Los Angeles Metro Rail A Line light rail line to Claremont is projected to be completed in 2031.

== History ==
Until November 2016, this station was one of the few Metrolink stations that utilized an existing older depot. The depot was built in 1927 by the Atchison, Topeka and Santa Fe Railway in the Spanish Colonial Revival style, and it was placed on the National Register of Historic Places in 1982. The station was listed in the National Register because of its architecture. The station was renovated at a cost of $2.8 million and reopened for Metrolink use on December 7, 1992. The station was staffed by Foothill Transit and sold bus passes and rail tickets. On November 20, 2016, the interior of the depot was converted into the new home of the Claremont Museum of Art.

== Connecting services ==
The station is designated as the Claremont TransCenter in Foothill Transit literature, and it serves lines 188, 197, 292, 480, and 492.

The Amtrak Thruway 19 provides twice daily connections from the station to/from Bakersfield to the north, and San Bernardino to the east, with several stops in between.

== See also ==
- List of Registered Historic Places in Los Angeles County, California
