= Pomona–Claremont Line =

Pacific Electric streetcar route (1911–1932)

Pomona–Claremont

Overview
- Owner: Ontario and San Antonio Heights Railroad Company (1911–1912) Pacific Electric (1912–1932)
- Locale: Los Angeles County, California
- Termini: Pomona; Claremont Upland (limited service)

Service
- Type: Interurban
- System: Pacific Electric
- Operator(s): Pacific Electric

History
- Opened: January 1, 1911
- Closed: December 31, 1932

Technical
- Track gauge: 1,435 mm (4 ft 8 1/2 in) standard gauge
- Electrification: 1200 / 600 V DC Overhead lines

The Pomona–Claremont Line was a Pacific Electric streetcar line in Southern California. Unlike most of the company's services, cars did not travel to Downtown Los Angeles and instead provided a suburban service between Pomona, Claremont, and Upland.

== History ==
The Ontario and San Antonio Heights Railroad Company opened the line On January 1, 1911 as their second route after the Ontario–San Antonio Heights Line. After Pomona Junction, cars ran over Pacific Electric tracks to the center of Pomona.

Pacific Electric acquired the company on April 13, 1912 and promptly began operating services between Pomona and Ontario. Cars were initially interlined with the Upland–Ontario Line. Service east of Claremont ended in November 1918, which also ended the through-routing. One trip was extended to Upland starting in 1922. By the end of its life in 1932, many trips were short turn shuttles running between Pomona and North Pomona with transfers to the San Bernardino Line.

== Route ==
Originating from the Pomona Pacific Electric Station at Third Street and Garey Avenue, the Pomona–Claremont Line proceeded north on Garey Avenue, as far as Cadillac Drive. From there, the line proceeded in a northeasterly direction in a private right of way until it joined the San Bernardino Line, just east of Maple Avenue. From there, the Pomona–Claremont ran on the San Bernardino Line to College Avenue in Claremont.
