= Ontario and San Antonio Heights Railroad Company =

Railway in California

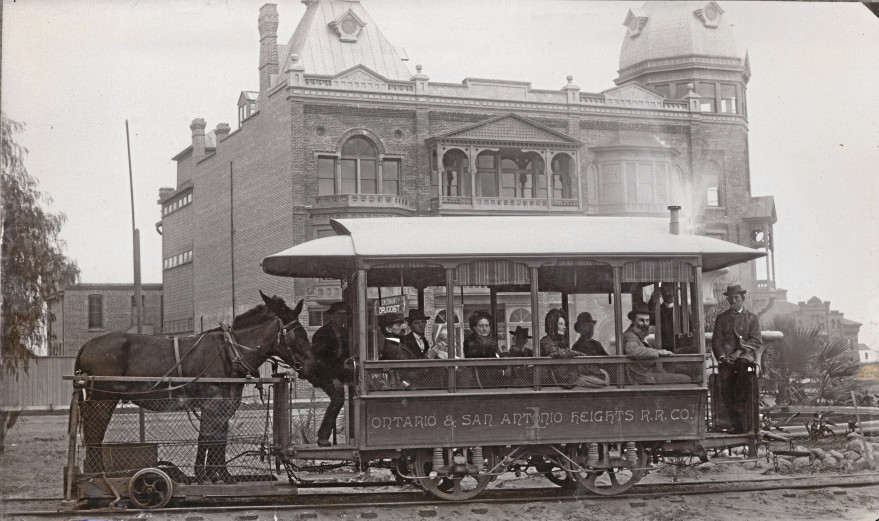
Ontario and San Antonio Heights Railroad Co. mule car in service

Ontario and San Antonio Heights Railroad Company is a former railway company which operated in Ontario, California. The company's service is noted for using a Gravity Mule Car from 1887 to 1895.

The mule-car served Ontario until 1895, when the line was electrified by new owners, Ontario Electric Company. It was occasionally used afterwards, when the electric generator in the powerhouse was flooded. The Ontario Electric Company was merged into the Pacific Light & Power Corporation in 1908, and the extension to Pomona commenced work in 1909, which opened New Year's Day 1911. The railroad would go on to be acquired by the Pacific Electric on April 13, 1912.

== Mule car ==
Operated from 1887 to 1895, a car with a pull-out trailer was utilized for passenger service, allowing the mules to ride on the car body on the downhill segment. Mules provided the propulsion for the uphill segment to Euclid Avenue, taking about 90 minutes. The downhill gravity-powered ride lasted only 30 minutes.

The obituary for the mule Sanky on the front page of the Ontario Daily Report of February 6, 1914 was under the headline, “Mule, Figure in Early History of Ontario, is Dead.” It mentioned that in 1895, Sanky and his partner Moody were sold to farmer C.B. Adams in San Antonio Heights after the inauguration of the electric tram had made them obsolete. When hitched to a harrow for ranch work, they persistently refused to budge and coaxing and force were equally without effect. The farmer had to motivate them by attaching a bell from the old rail car to his harrow. With the familiar signal, the mules started valiantly up the orchard, but at the head of the orchard, Moody and Sanky persisted in attempting to climb onto the harrow for the downward journey, said the obituary. It took weeks before the pair could be trained to plow in both directions.

== Route ==
The railroad operated along Euclid Avenue, connecting the Ontario Southern Pacific station in the south to the Upland Santa Fe station, Euclid Avenue stop of the Pacific Electric Upland–San Bernardino Line, and continuing north to San Antonio Heights.

== Under Pacific Electric ==
Starting with Pacific Electric's acquisition in 1912, the segment from Upland to Ontario was through-routed Pomona–Claremont–Upland Line, providing a one-seat (though indirect) ride between Ontario and Pomona. This line saw service until October 6, 1922. The Upland–San Antonio Heights segment was an independent streetcar service until about July 1924 when system-wide power issues forced bus substitution that was never reversed.

== See also ==
- Pomona–Claremont Line
- Upland–Ontario Line
