= Graber Olive House =

Site of Californian olive packing business

Coordinates: 34.078373°N 117.647573°W

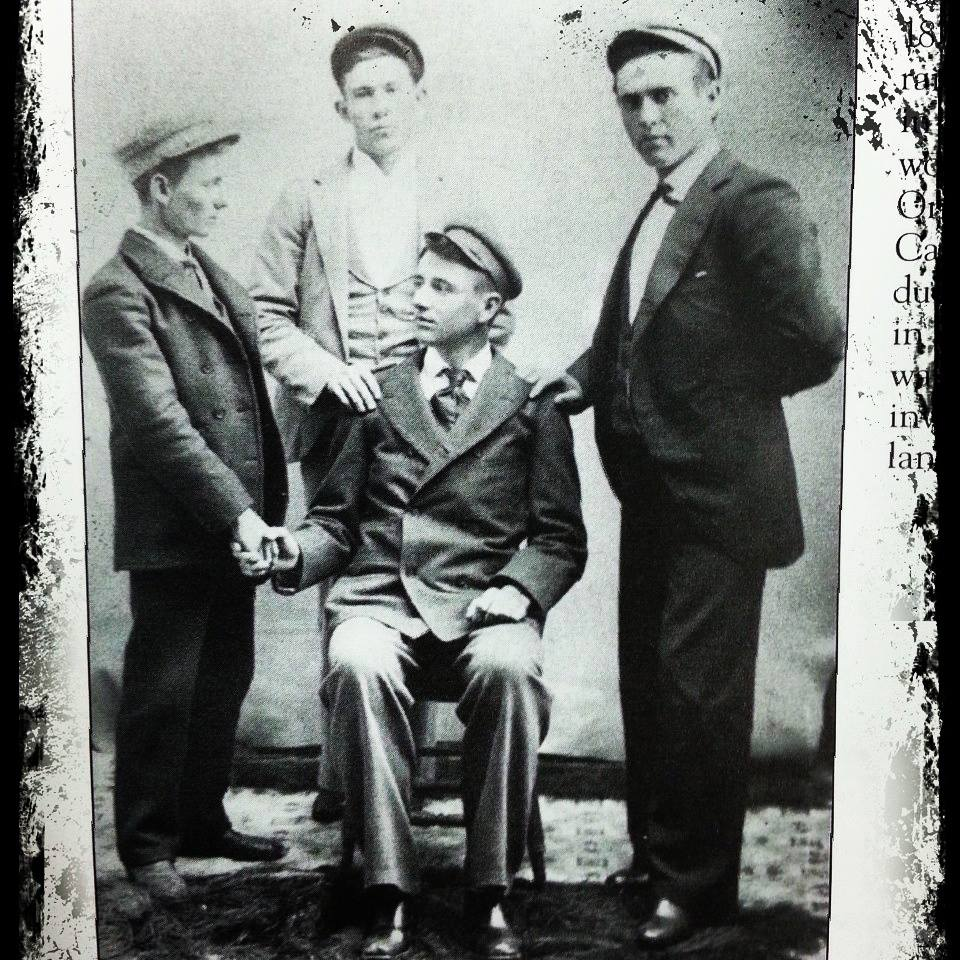
Founder Cliff Graber (sitting) arrived in California soon after this photograph was taken in 1892.

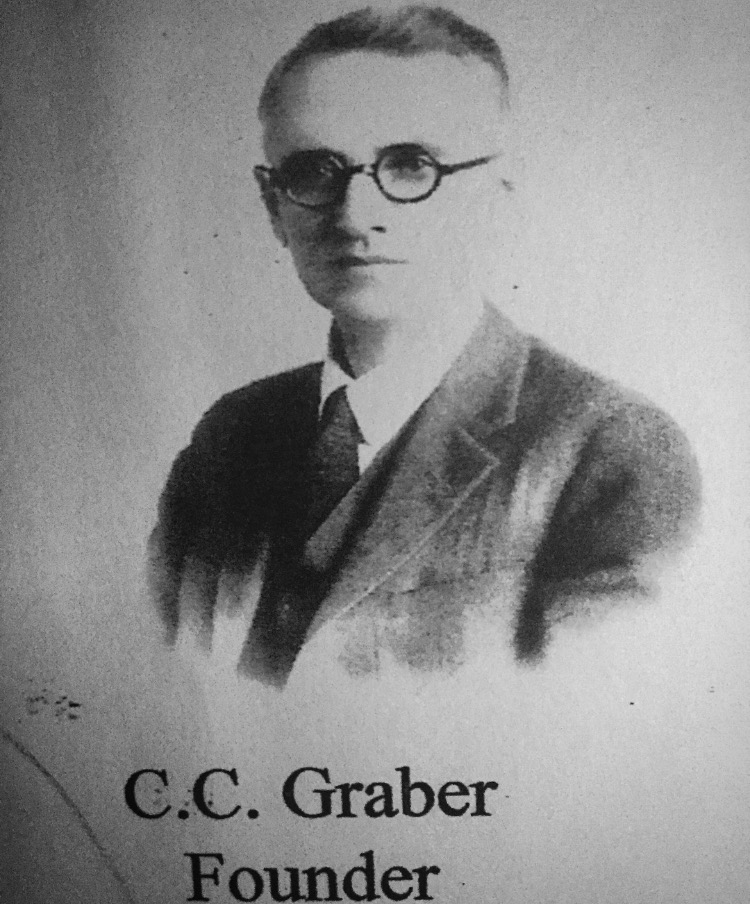
"Cliff" Graber, founder and developer of the C. C. Graber Company that produces Graber Olives

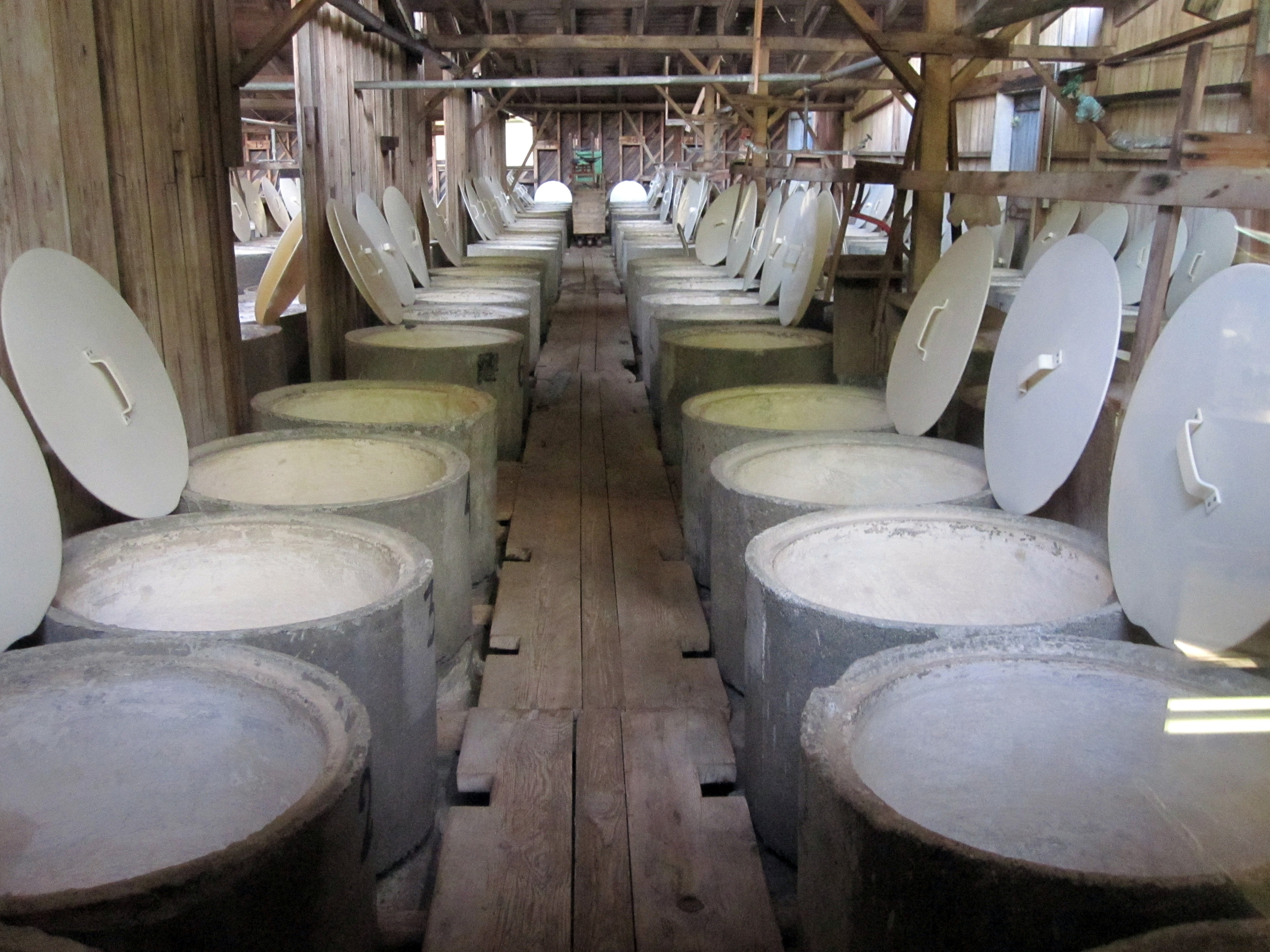
The olive vat room at Graber Olive House

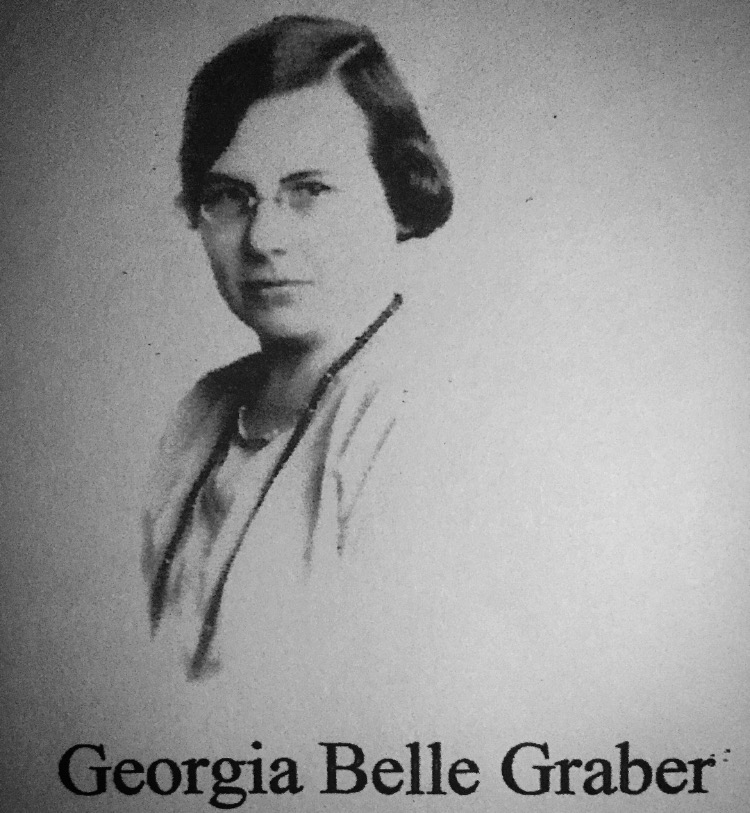
Georgia Belle Coe married Graber in 1905 and participated in the business.

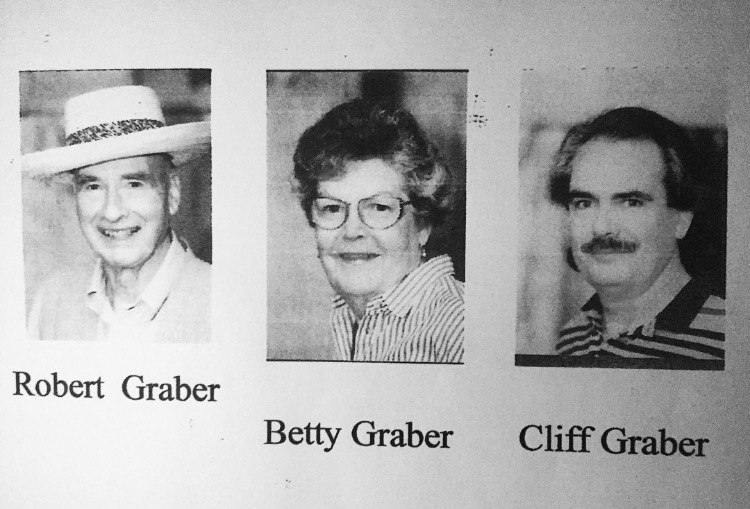
Family members continue to own and operate the business.

The Graber Olive House in Ontario, California, is the original site of the longest operating olive packing business in the United States. The family home, in which the product, designated as Graber Olives, was developed, was designated as historic, and the original farm is designated as a historic site. The business was founded in 1894, two years after Clifford C. Graber and his brother, Charles, arrived from Clay City, Indiana.

== History ==
Acquiring property in Ontario, 19-year-old Clifford ("Cliff") Graber began growing citrus on his newly acquired acreage. Delighting in the taste of the locally grown olives cured by neighboring ranchers, however, he planted olive trees and started curing his own. His olives proved so popular that he soon launched a small-scale business. In 1894, two years after planting his olive trees, Graber began selling vat-cured olives.

He married Georgia Belle Noe in 1905. She participated in the business and sold fresh olives right out of the vats used to hold the olives after they had been picked.

By 1910, Graber had developed a rope-propelled apparatus for grading olives by size. At the same time, he began canning them. A decade later, expanding his operations, he planted his trademark Manzanilla olive trees in Hemet. In 1934, Graber enlarged his cannery on the Ontario site. Nine years later, their sons, Robert and William, took over the business, although Cliff remained active until his death in 1955 at age 83.

By 1963, Robert ("Bob") Graber, who was born in the family home on the Graber Olives property in Ontario, had become sole proprietor of the business. Bob Graber and his wife, Betty, continued to work in the family business along with their son, Cliff, now residing in the family home. At that time, Bob Graber moved the growing operation to 75 acres of olive groves in the San Joaquin Valley, near Porterville, where it remains.

From Porterville the harvested olives are trucked to Ontario during the harvest season, lasting about two months each fall, for canning.

In 2020 the Graber Olive House property was declared a historic district by the City of Ontario.

== Operations ==
The business boasts that their olives are unique because they are tree-ripened before they are picked, according to Flo Duncan, personnel director for Graber Olive House. Duncan also notes that the business is not computerized.

Once the olives arrive at the Ontario site, they are graded by size, then cured in one of 550 concrete vats for three weeks. Water and salt solutions are changed daily. After they are removed from the vats, the olives are fed through a filling wheel, where employees scoop them by hand into aluminum cans running on a conveyor belt.

A "Panama paddle packer" machine creates a 200-degree steam bath as cans are sealed tight with aluminum lids. Then giant pressure cookers, called retorts, pressurize the cans and their contents for 62 minutes at 242 degrees Fahrenheit. After the cans cool, a labeling machine applies their identifications and sizes, from the smallest (size 12) to the largest (size 16).

In a little more than three weeks, Graber Olives progress from tree to can. In a good season, the business processes approximately 150 tons of olives, which they ship to markets, gourmet stores and customers globally, according to Duncan.

Graber Olive House closed during the COVID-19 Pandemic. As of July 2024, they are closed, their website is down, and their social media sites are no longer used.

In October 2025 the family announced they were raising money to save the Graber Olive House from foreclosure stating that "efforts to revive the olive-packing operation have stalled due to setbacks with permits from the city, increasing costs, and needed renovations."

== In the media ==
=== Television ===
In May 2020, the Graber Olive House was featured on a season 19 episode of Ghost Adventures entitled "The Graber Family Farm." Owner Robert Graber Jr. had his staff and other paranormal investigators report paranormal claims of what they all call "The Creeper", a vicious entity, believed to be an elemental that torments them in the vat room. This free publicity increased business.
