= Ontario station (Amtrak) =

Rail station in Ontario, California, US

Ontario, CA
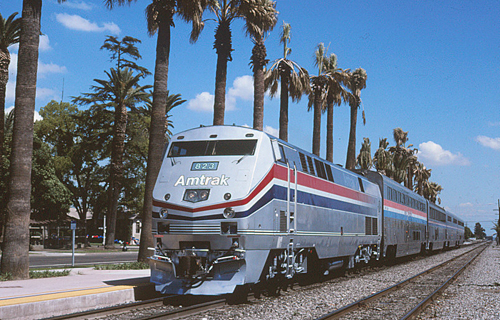
- The Sunset Limited at Ontario station in March 1995

General information
- Location: 198 East Emporia Street; Ontario, California; United States
- Coordinates: 34.0617°N 117.6496°W
- Line: Union Pacific Railroad Alhambra Subdivision
- Platforms: 1 side platform
- Tracks: 2

Other information
- Station code: Amtrak: ONA

History
- Opened: December 1994
- Rebuilt: 1991
- Original company: Southern Pacific

Passengers
- FY 2025: 4,884 (Amtrak)

Services
Preceding station	Amtrak	Following station
Pomona toward Los Angeles	Sunset Limited	Palm Springs toward New Orleans
Pomona toward Los Angeles	Texas Eagle	Palm Springs toward Chicago
Previous services
Preceding station	Southern Pacific Railroad	Following station
Pomona toward Los Angeles	Sunset Route	Colton toward New Orleans
Preceding station	Pacific Electric	Following station
Transit & Commercial Court toward Upland	Upland–Ontario	Terminus
Location

Ontario station is an Amtrak train station in Ontario, California, located on the Union Pacific Railroad Alhambra Subdivision. It is served by the thrice-weekly Sunset Limited/Texas Eagle. The station has a covered, open-air pavilion built by the city in 1991.

Of the 73 California stations served by Amtrak, Ontario was the 70th-busiest in fiscal year 2019, boarding or detraining an average of approximately 11 passengers daily (though the station does not receive daily service).

The Omnitrans Route 61 bus operates daily between this station and Pomona–Downtown station, Ontario International Airport, and Fontana station.

The Amtrak Thruway #19 stops here twice daily, providing service between San Bernardino and Bakersfield, and points in between.

== History ==
Ontario was initially a flag stop on the Southern Pacific Sunset Route.

Local streetcar service was provided nearby at the corner of Euclid and Emporia by the Ontario and San Antonio Heights Railroad Company by 1897. The line was acquired by Pacific Electric in 1912, which continued to operate here until 1928.

The Amtrak station was constructed in 1991, funded by local, county, and state sources. Service began in December 1994, with a dedication for the new station held the following March.
