= Ontario, California =

City in California, United States

- City
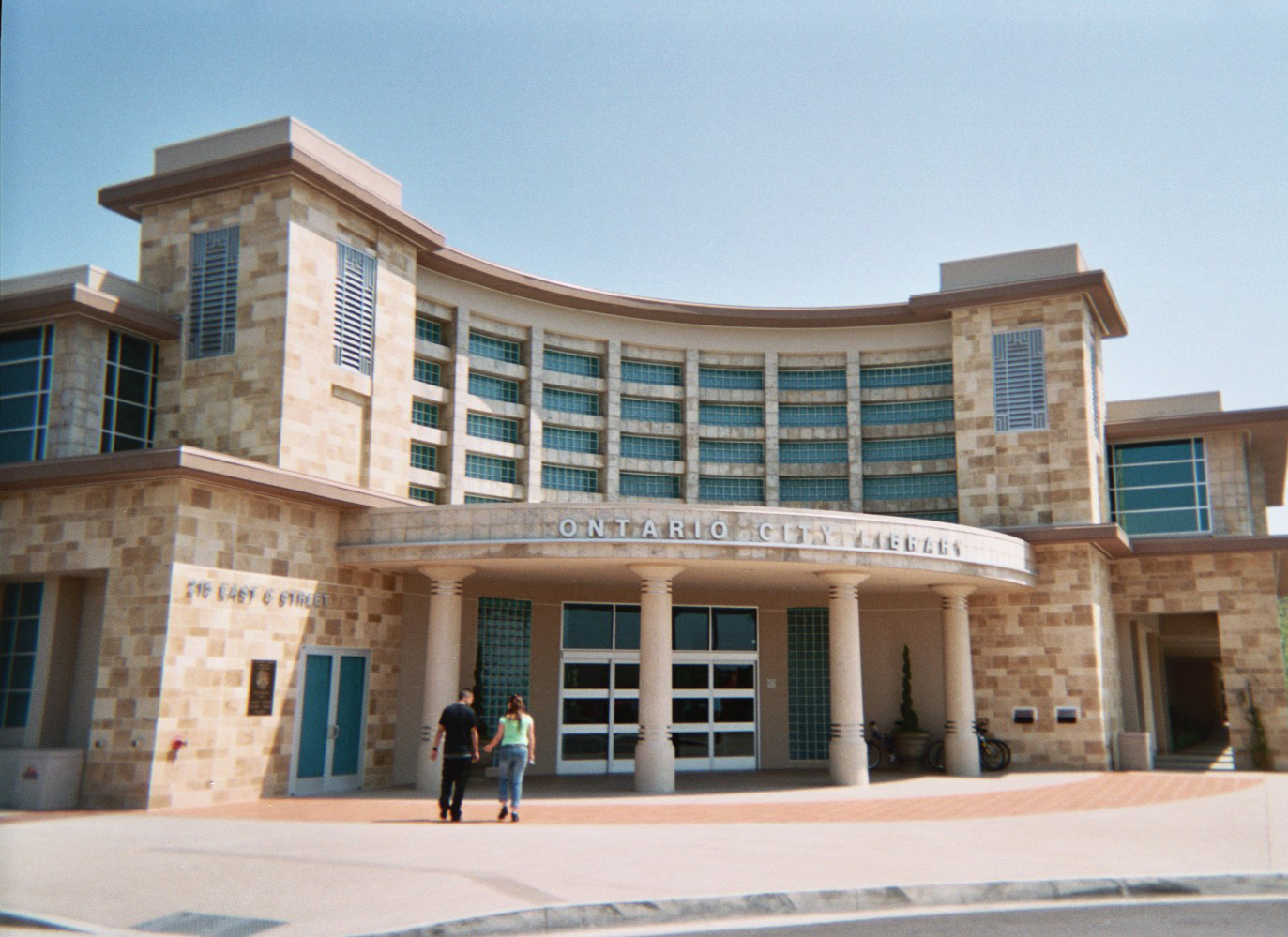
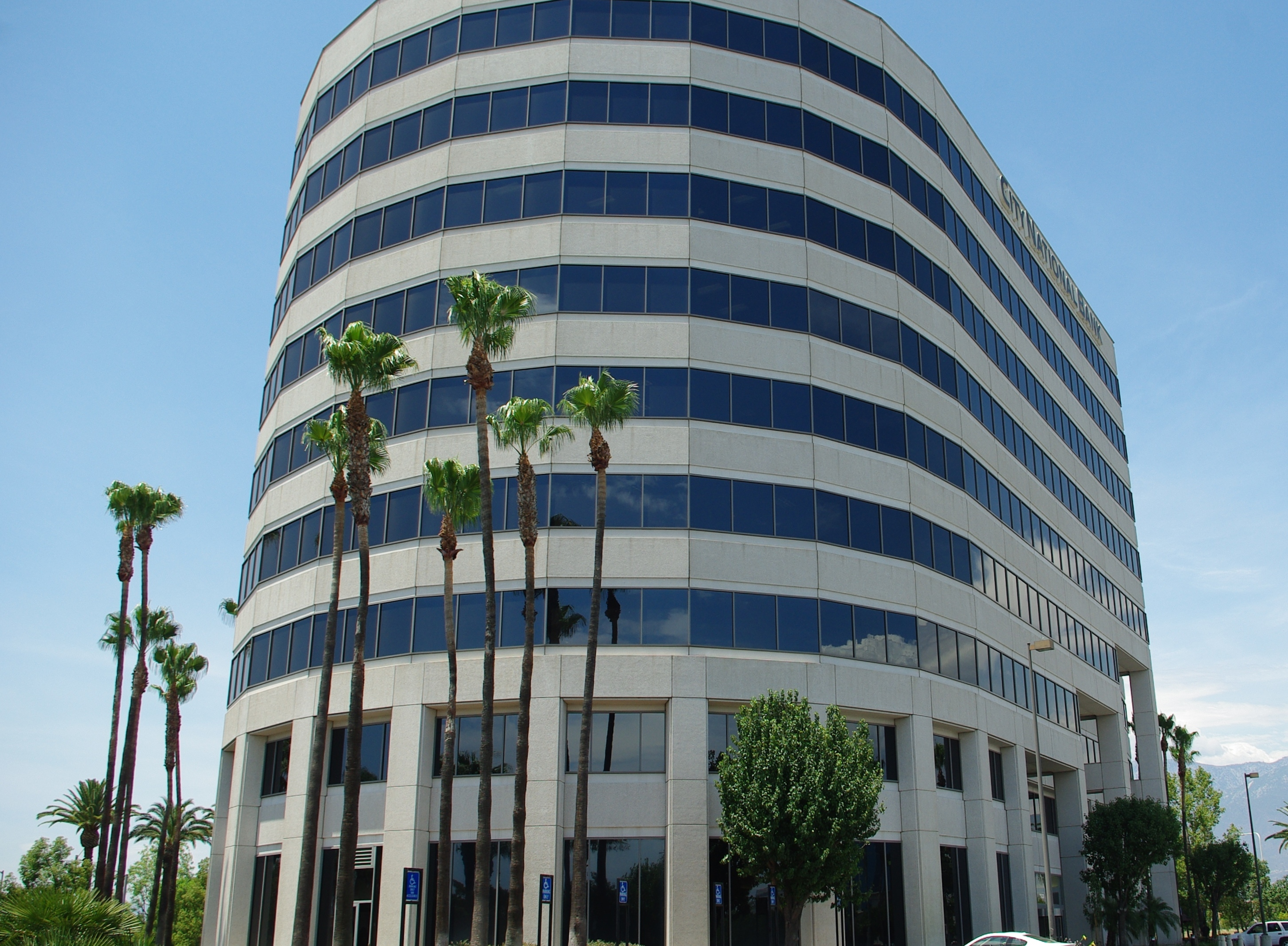
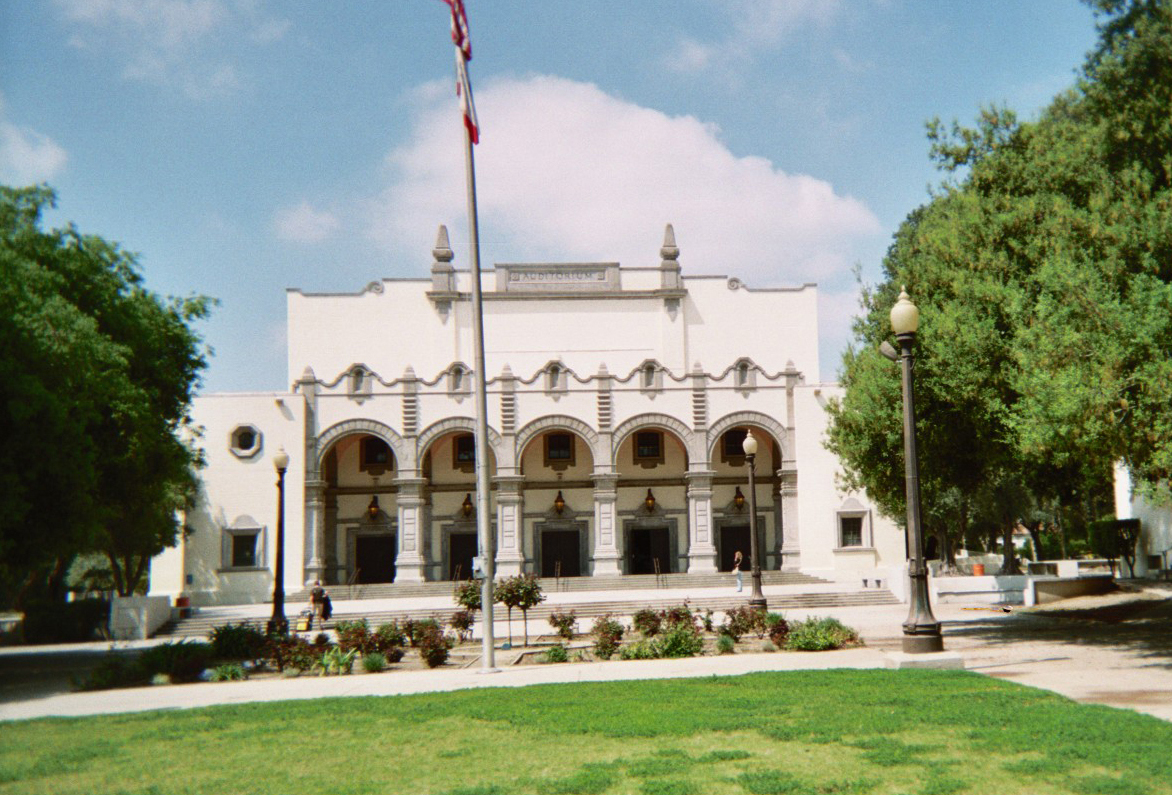
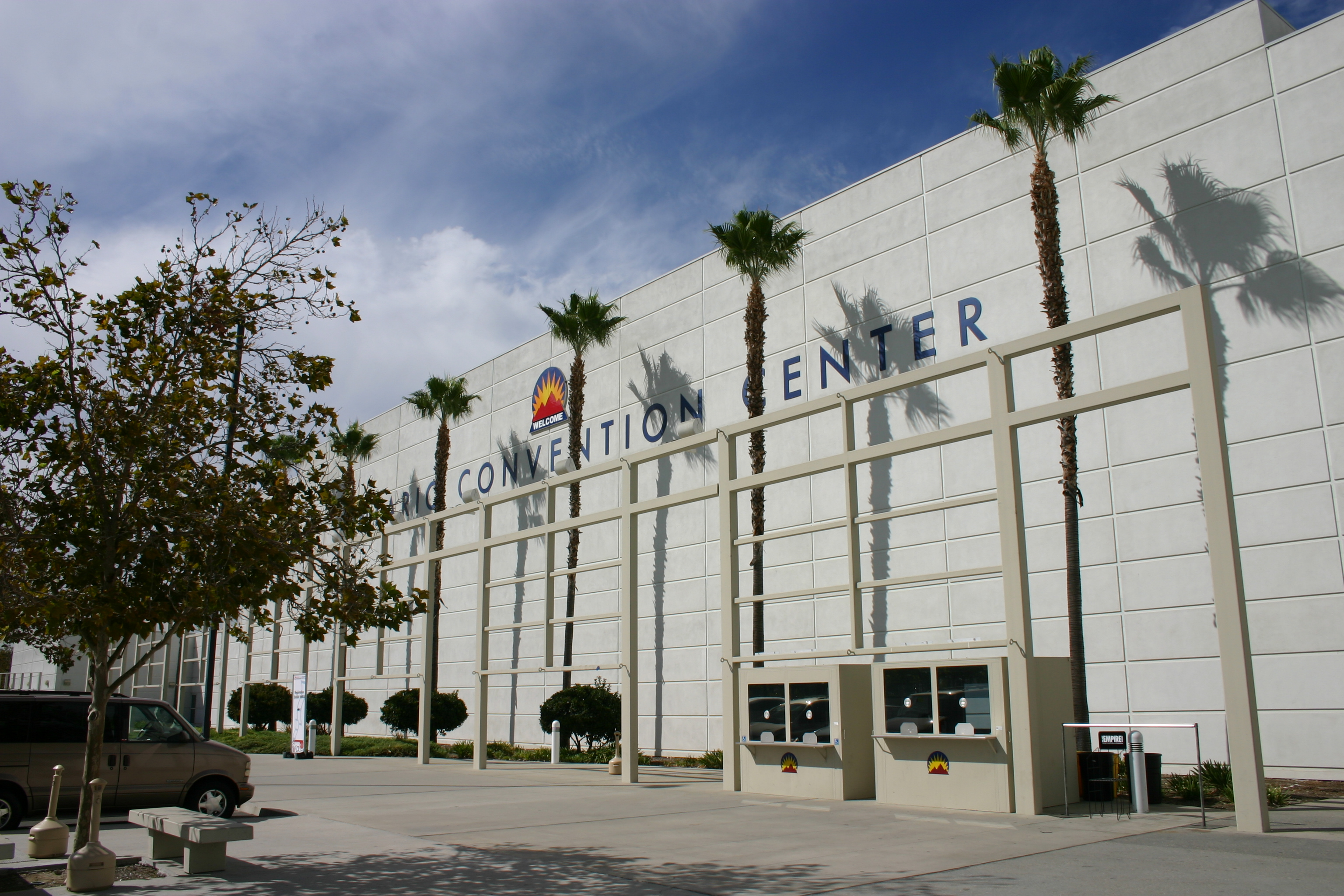
- Clockwise: Ovitt Family Community Library; Empire Towers; Ontario Convention Center; Chaffey High School

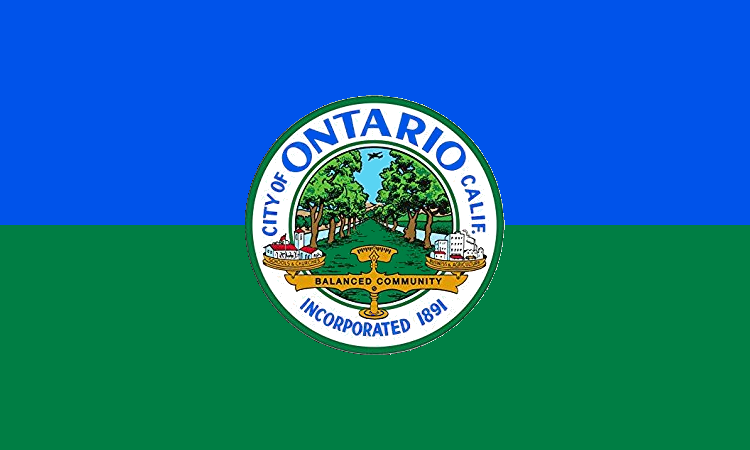
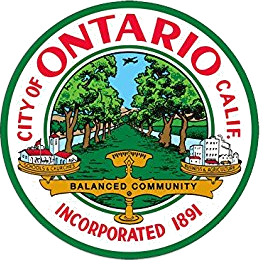
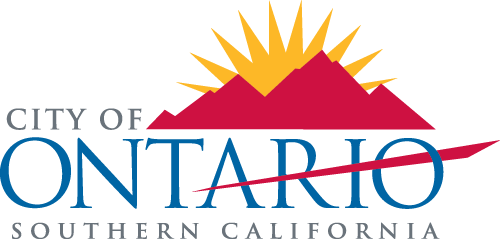
- Flag Seal Coat of arms
- Motto: Southern California's Next Urban Center
- Interactive map of Ontario, California
- Location relative to Los Angeles County Ontario, California (California) Ontario, California (the United States)
- Coordinates: 34°03′10″N 117°37′40″W
- Country: United States
- State: California
- County: San Bernardino
- Incorporated: December 10, 1891
- Named for: Ontario, Canada

Government
  - Type: City Council / City Manager
  - City Council: Mayor Paul S. Leon; Mayor Pro Tem Alan D. Wapner; Debra Dorst-Porada; Jim W. Bowman; Daisy Macias

Area
  - Total: 50.00 sq mi (129.50 km^{2})
  - Land: 49.97 sq mi (129.43 km^{2})
  - Water: 0.031 sq mi (0.08 km^{2}) 0.13%
- Elevation: 1,004 ft (306 m)

Population (2020)
  - Total: 175,265
  - Estimate (2025): 187,013
  - Rank: 3rd in San Bernardino County; 25th in California; 143rd in the United States
  - Density: 3,507/sq mi (1,354.1/km^{2})
- Time zone: UTC−8 (Pacific)
  - Summer (DST): UTC−7 (PDT)
- ZIP codes: 91758, 91761, 91762, 91764
- Area code: 909
- FIPS code: 06-53896
- GNIS feature IDs: 1652764, 2411323
- Website: www.ontarioca.gov

Ontario is a city in southwestern San Bernardino County, California, United States, 35 miles (56 km) east of downtown Los Angeles and 23 miles (37 km) west of downtown San Bernardino, the county seat. Located in the western part of the Inland Empire metropolitan area, it lies just east of Los Angeles County and is part of the Los Angeles metropolitan area. As of the 2020 census, the city had a population of 175,265.

The city is home to Ontario International Airport, which is the 8th-busiest airport in the United States by cargo carried, as of 2026. Ontario handles the mass of freight traffic between the ports of Los Angeles and Long Beach and the rest of the country.

It takes its name from the Ontario Model Colony development established in 1882 by the Canadian engineer George Chaffey and his brothers, William Chaffey and Charles Chaffey. They named the settlement after their home province of Ontario, Canada's most populous province.

== History ==
=== Tovaangar (before 1771) ===
Ontario was inhabited by the Tongva people for over 1,000 years. Their country is now known as Tovaangar. The Ontario area was connected to the village of Cucamonga, whose location is not precisely known. The Native and Indigenous histories of Ontario are unknown and underdeveloped, but there are some digital projects.

The Spanish Empire's New Spain Portolá expedition found and named the Santa Ana River in 1769. They also explored the Cucamonga area.

=== Spanish Empire (1771–1822) ===
In 1771, Franciscans from New Spain settled nearby, and established the Mission San Gabriel Arcángel, founding what is today San Gabriel. They enslaved the Tongva people. The area was now part of the New Spain Province of Las Californias.

Juan Bautista de Anza passed through the area on his 1774 expedition, which created a land route between the province of Sonora and San Gabriel. An Ontario city park and a middle school now bear his name. The route became known as the El Camino Real.

In 1804, the northern part of Las Californias became the new province of Nueva California.

In 1810, the San Gabriel Franciscans took over the Tongva village of Kaawchama (in today's west Redlands), replacing it with the Guachama rancheria. This included a chapel devoted to San Bernardino (beginning the association of the saint with the area). The rancheria was destroyed by the Serrano in 1812, and was rebuilt nearby as the San Bernardino de Sena estancia in 1819.

=== Mexico (1822–1847) ===
In 1822, word of the Mexican triumph in the Mexican War of Independence reached Nueva California, and the lands previously controlled by the Spanish Empire passed to the custody of the Mexican government.

In 1824, the province of Nueva California was renamed Alta California. In 1826, American explorer Jedediah Smith passed through what is now Upland on the first known overland journey from the east coast to the west coast of North America. He used Native American trails that he helped establish as the California Trail. (This later became the National Old Trails Road, Route 66, and today's Foothill Boulevard.)

Use of the San Gabriel mission's Rancho Cucamonga was in 1839 granted to Tiburcio Tapia by Alta Californian governor Juan Bautista Alvarado as part of the secularization of California land holdings. This emancipated the Tongva enslaved there.

The name Mount San Antonio was probably bestowed by Antonio Maria Lugo, owner of Rancho San Antonio near present-day Compton circa 1840, in honor of his patron saint, Anthony of Padua.

In 1845, Rancho Cucamonga was inherited by Tapia's daughter, Maria Prudhomme, and her husband Leon Prudhomme.

=== United States (1847 onward) ===
==== 1800s ====
In January 1847, the United States took control of the area, after the conquest of California during the Mexican-American War, and U.S. control was formalised by the Treaty of Cahuenga. Under the Treaty of Guadalupe Hidalgo in 1848, the United States recognised the existing land tenure, and took formal control of the land. It ruled it under a military administration until a new civilian body was established in December 1849, which became the state of California in September 1850. In February 1850, the interim California government established Los Angeles County. (The earlier Los Angeles municipal government did not cover today's Ontario.)

The new Californian administration soon began a war of extermination against the Tongva, which came to be known as being part of the California genocide. 1850's Act for the Government and Protection of Indians ensured that slavery of the people it covered remained legal.

San Bernardino County was founded in 1853, following the establishment of a new Mormon settlement. A road was built between San Bernardino and Los Angeles that year, passing through Rancho Cucamonga.

Rancho Cucamonga was sold in 1858 to John Rains.

Slavery of Native Americans became illegal in California in 1865.

John Rain's heirs sold Rancho Cucamonga in 1870 to an Isaias Hellman-led syndicate, the "Cucamonga Company". 20 years after the initial application, the California government formally converted the title of the rancho to freehold in 1872.

In 1881, the Chaffey brothers, George and William, purchased a parcel of Hellman's Rancho Cucamonga land, and rights to Mount San Antonio water. The brothers established a settlement they named "Ontario" in honor of the province of Ontario in Canada, where they were from.

The land was sometimes referred to the "San Antonio lands", as they included half the water rights to Mount San Antonio (colloquially known as "Mount Baldy"). They engineered a drainage system channelling water from the foothills of the mountain down to the flatter lands below that performed the dual functions of allowing farmers to water their crops and preventing the floods that periodically afflict them.

They also created the main thoroughfare of Euclid Avenue (California Highway 83), with its distinctive wide lanes and grassy median. A mule-drawn passenger tramway was used from 1887 to 1895 on the central reservation the Avenue, operated by the Ontario and San Antonio Heights Railroad Company.

The San Antonio Water Company was incorporated in October 1882. Since then it has served the area that is today Ontario, Upland and, San Antonio Heights, and to a lesser extent Montclair.

In 1885, the Chaffey brothers opened a campus of the University of Southern California. This included a secondary school.

Also in 1885, the Ontario Record newspaper was founded. (It would later be known as The Daily Report.)

The new "Model Colony" (called so because it offered the perfect balance between agriculture and the urban comforts of schools, churches, and commerce) was originally conceived as a dry town, early deeds containing clauses forbidding the manufacture or sale of alcoholic beverages within the town.

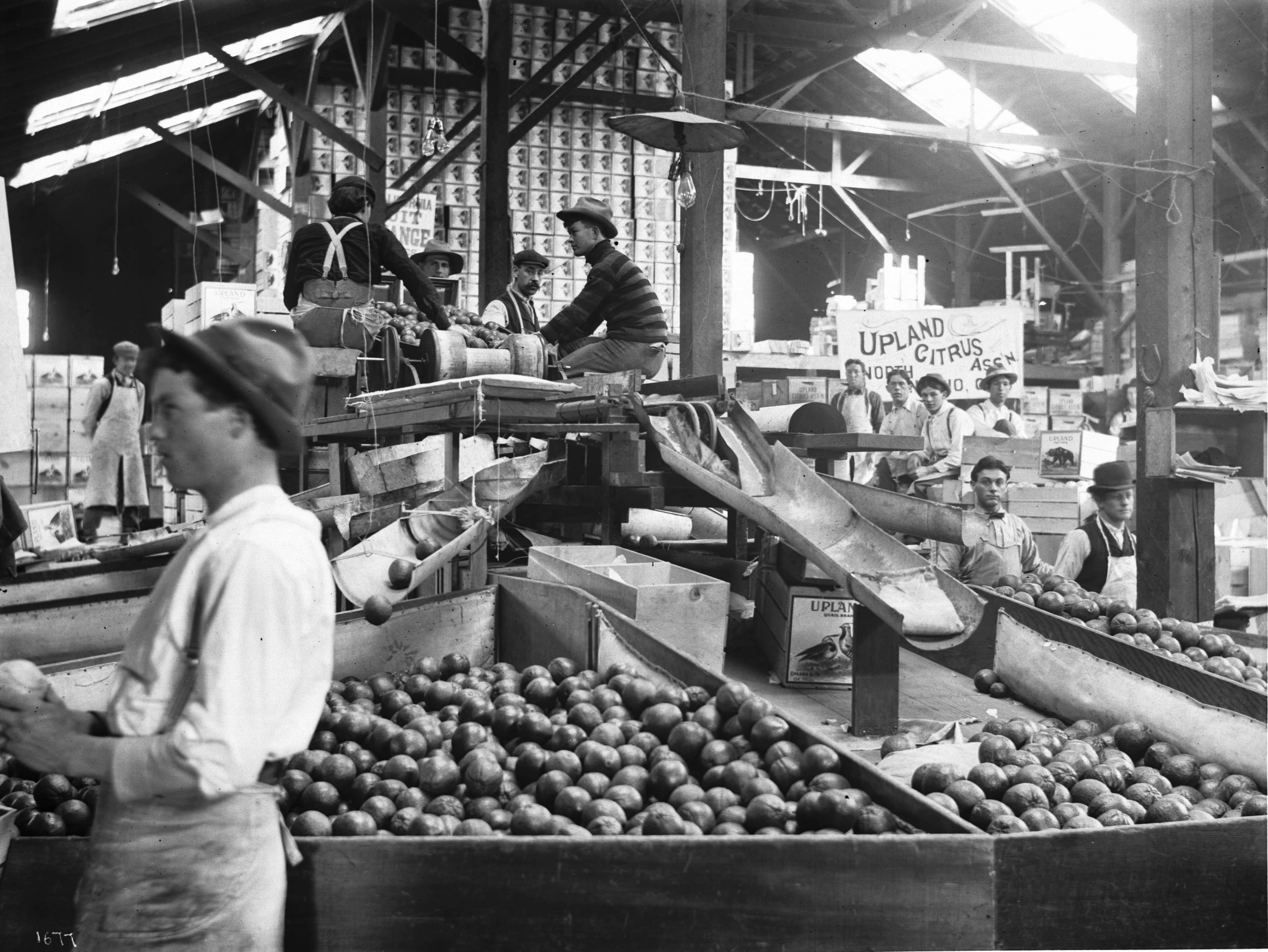
Interior of citrus packing house in Ontario, 1905

Ontario attracted farmers (primarily growing citrus) and ailing Easterners seeking a drier climate (often to treat tuberculosis). To impress visitors and potential settlers with the "abundance" of water in Ontario, a fountain was placed at the Southern Pacific railway station. It was turned on when passenger trains were approaching and frugally turned off again after their departure. The original "Chaffey fountain," a simple spigot surrounded by a ring of white stones, was later replaced by the more ornate "Frankish Fountain", an art nouveau creation now located outside the Ontario Museum of History and Art. Agriculture was vital to the early economy, and many street names recall this legacy. The Sunkist plant remains as a living vestige of the citrus era.

The Chaffey brothers left in 1886 to found the Australian irrigation settlements of Mildura and Renmark, selling their Ontario assets to the Ontario Land & Improvement Company. Its president was Charles Frankish. He founded the Ontario State Bank in 1887, the settlement's first bank.

Central Ontario was incorporated as a city in 1891. The San Antonio Electric Light & Power Company was organized in 1891 to provide electricity to Ontario, Pomona and Redlands.

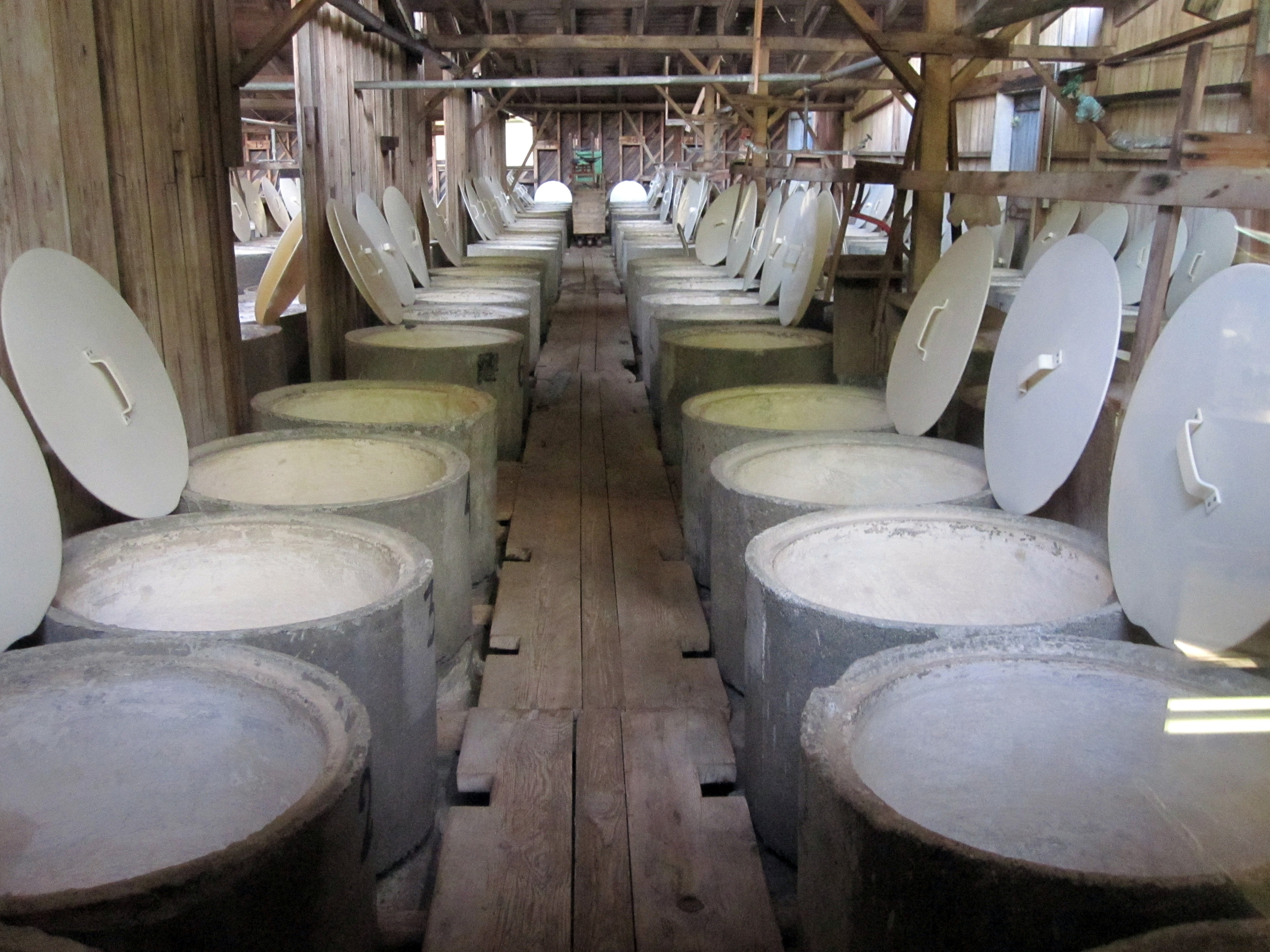
The olive vat room at Graber Olive House in Ontario, California. In 1894, two years after planting olive trees in Ontario, C. C. Graber began selling vat cured olives from the pictured vat room in vats similar to the ones pictured. Graber Olive House is the oldest operating olive packer in the United States.

The Graber Olive House was established in 1894, and is now the longest operating olive packing business in the United States.

In 1895, the Ontario Electric Company was established by Charles Frankish. In its first year it took over the mule-cars, and replaced them with electrical powered vehicles.

==== 1900s ====
The City of Ontario's territory was greatly expanded in 1900.

Tens of thousands of European immigrants came to work in agriculture. In the early 1900s, the first Filipinos and Japanese farm laborers arrived, and later many came to own plant nurseries.

In 1901, the original college closed, and a new Ontario High School replaced it. This soon became Chaffey College, and offered college courses as well as high school education.

Ontario was declared a "model colony" by an act of Congress in 1903.

North Ontario broke away from the city in 1906, calling itself Upland.

In 1912, the streetcar line became the Upland–Ontario Line of Pacific Electric. It was closed in 1928.

In 1929, the city of Ontario established the Ontario Municipal Airport. This is now the Ontario International Airport, and is the largest employer in the city.

AM radio station KOCS began in 1946, which was followed by sister station KOCS-FM in 1947. The stations initially operated as part of The Daily Report, and would go on to change their name, format and ownership many times.

In 1960, the higher education part of Chaffey College moved to nearby Rancho Cucamonga.

From 1970 to 1980, the Ontario Motor Speedway hosted motor racing events including the California 500, and music events like California Jam.

The Cardenas supermarket chain began in Ontario in 1981.

The Daily Report merged with the nearby Progress Bulletin to become the Inland Valley Daily Bulletin in 1990.

An Ontario station of the Metrolink rail service opened in 1993 (it later became known as "Ontario – East").

Large shopping mall Ontario Mills opened to the public on November 14, 1996, on the old Ontario Motor Speedway parking lot.

On December 13, 1996, AMC Theatres opened AMC Ontario Mills 30 in Ontario, which it billed as the "world's largest theater". Three months later, Edwards Theaters opened the Edwards Ontario Palace 22 across the street. If the two adjacent parking lots were treated as one, Ontario now had 52 screens on one parking lot, more than any other location in the United States. The opening of that many screens in the Inland Empire came about as the culmination of a lifelong rivalry between AMC's Stanley Durwood and Edwards Theaters's James Edwards. Edwards was infuriated when he learned Durwood had beaten him to a deal with Ontario Mills, and later told him, "I had to teach you a lesson". As a result, the name Ontario became synonymous with self-destructive rivalry in the North American film exhibition industry. At the ShoWest conference in March 1997, Bill Kartozian, the former head of the National Association of Theatre Owners, told the attendees: "Thou shalt not Ontario each other".

The Ontario Convention Centre opened in 1997.

In 1999, the large agricultural area in the south of Ontario (the "ag preserve") was rezoned for residential and commercial use. This area was now described as the "New Model Colony", before being renamed Ontario Ranch, and finally New Haven.

==== 2000s ====
The University of La Verne opened a law-focused campus in Ontario in 2001.

In 2008, the Ontario Community Events Center opened. It hosts a number of professional minor-league indoor sports teams. Also that year, West Coast University opened a campus in the city.

The headquarters of the Southern Baptist Convention's Gateway Seminary moved to Ontario in 2016.

Amazon opened their largest United States warehouse in Ontario in 2024.

In 2026, a 1.2 million square feet(111483 m2) paper warehouse was set on fire by an arsonist who compared themselves to Luigi Mangione.

== Geography ==
According to the United States Census Bureau, the city has a total area of 50.0 square miles (129 km^{2}). Of that, 49.9 square miles (129 km^{2}) is land and 0.1 square miles (0.26 km^{2}) is water. The total area is 0.13% water.

=== Climate ===
The climate of Ontario is influenced by BSh semi-arid conditions, with hot summers and mild winters. Santa Ana Winds hit the area frequently in autumn and winter. Extremes range from 118 °F (48 °C) down to 25 °F (−4 °C). According to the Köppen Climate Classification system, Ontario has a hot-summer Mediterranean climate, abbreviated "Csa" on climate maps.

Climate data for Ontario, California (Ontario International Airport) (1991–2020 normals, extremes 1998–present)
Month	Jan	Feb	Mar	Apr	May	Jun	Jul	Aug	Sep	Oct	Nov	Dec	Year
Record high °F (°C)	90 (32)	90 (32)	94 (34)	101 (38)	103 (39)	112 (44)	117 (47)	112 (44)	118 (48)	107 (42)	98 (37)	87 (31)	118 (48)
Mean maximum °F (°C)	82.2 (27.9)	82.9 (28.3)	88.5 (31.4)	94.1 (34.5)	96.2 (35.7)	101.4 (38.6)	104.9 (40.5)	106.0 (41.1)	106.9 (41.6)	98.9 (37.2)	92.0 (33.3)	80.7 (27.1)	110.5 (43.6)
Mean daily maximum °F (°C)	67.7 (19.8)	68.1 (20.1)	71.7 (22.1)	75.7 (24.3)	79.8 (26.6)	86.4 (30.2)	93.8 (34.3)	94.9 (34.9)	91.3 (32.9)	82.6 (28.1)	74.7 (23.7)	66.9 (19.4)	79.5 (26.4)
Daily mean °F (°C)	56.1 (13.4)	57.1 (13.9)	60.2 (15.7)	63.4 (17.4)	67.7 (19.8)	73.2 (22.9)	79.2 (26.2)	80.1 (26.7)	77.6 (25.3)	69.8 (21.0)	61.9 (16.6)	55.2 (12.9)	66.8 (19.3)
Mean daily minimum °F (°C)	44.6 (7.0)	46.2 (7.9)	48.7 (9.3)	51.1 (10.6)	55.6 (13.1)	60.0 (15.6)	64.7 (18.2)	65.2 (18.4)	63.8 (17.7)	57.1 (13.9)	49.0 (9.4)	43.6 (6.4)	54.1 (12.3)
Mean minimum °F (°C)	33.9 (1.1)	35.0 (1.7)	39.2 (4.0)	44.0 (6.7)	48.5 (9.2)	54.9 (12.7)	59.3 (15.2)	59.7 (15.4)	55.9 (13.3)	48.4 (9.1)	39.3 (4.1)	33.1 (0.6)	31.3 (−0.4)
Record low °F (°C)	25 (−4)	29 (−2)	33 (1)	33 (1)	42 (6)	46 (8)	56 (13)	56 (13)	51 (11)	41 (5)	32 (0)	28 (−2)	25 (−4)
Average precipitation inches (mm)	2.57 (65)	3.07 (78)	1.64 (42)	0.76 (19)	0.30 (7.6)	0.02 (0.51)	0.05 (1.3)	0.03 (0.76)	0.10 (2.5)	0.41 (10)	0.80 (20)	1.89 (48)	11.64 (296)
Average precipitation days (≥ 0.01 in)	5.1	6.4	5.3	3.6	1.7	0.3	0.6	0.3	0.7	2.2	3.7	5.6	35.5
Source: NOAA (mean maxima/minima 2006–2020)

== Demographics ==
Historical population
Census	Pop.	Note	%±
1890	683		—
1900	722		5.7%
1910	4,274		492.0%
1920	7,280		70.3%
1930	13,583		86.6%
1940	14,197		4.5%
1950	22,872		61.1%
1960	46,617		103.8%
1970	64,118		37.5%
1980	88,820		38.5%
1990	133,179		49.9%
2000	158,007		18.6%
2010	163,924		3.7%
2020	175,265		6.9%
U.S. Decennial Census

=== Racial and ethnic composition ===
The most common country of origin in Ontario besides the United States is Mexico. 19.04% of Ontario's population is Mexican-born. The other most common countries of origin outside the United States in Ontario are the Philippines, El Salvador, Guatemala, Vietnam, Korea, China, Honduras, Thailand and Peru. The most common spoken languages in Ontario besides English are Spanish, Vietnamese, Chinese, Tagalog, other Pacific Island language, Korean, Portuguese, Urdu and Arabic. Roman Catholicism is the most practiced religion. German, Irish, English, Italian and Dutch are the most common ancestries.

Ontario, California – Racial and ethnic composition Note: the US Census treats Hispanic/Latino as an ethnic category. This table excludes Latinos from the racial categories and assigns them to a separate category. Hispanics/Latinos may be of any race.
Race / Ethnicity (NH = Non-Hispanic)	Pop 2000	Pop 2010	Pop 2020	% 2000	% 2010	% 2020
White alone (NH)	42,048	29,898	23,997	26.61%	18.24%	13.69%
Black or African American alone (NH)	11,317	9,598	10,336	7.16%	5.86%	5.90%
Native American or Alaska Native alone (NH)	475	361	409	0.30%	0.22%	0.23%
Asian alone (NH)	5,914	8,078	15,693	3.74%	4.93%	8.95%
Native Hawaiian or Pacific Islander alone (NH)	519	448	415	0.33%	0.27%	0.24%
Other race alone (NH)	284	386	933	0.18%	0.24%	0.53%
Mixed race or Multiracial (NH)	2,840	2,070	3,554	1.80%	1.26%	2.03%
Hispanic or Latino (any race)	94,610	113,085	119,928	59.88%	68.99%	68.43%
Total	158,007	163,924	175,265	100.00%	100.00%	100.00%

=== 2020 ===
The U.S. Census accounts for race by two methodologies. "Race alone" and "Race alone less Hispanics" where Hispanics are delineated separately as if a separate race.

According to the 2020 U.S. census, the racial makeup (including Hispanics in the racial counts) was 24.15% (42,332) White alone, 6.30% (11,045) Black alone, 2.39% (4,184) Native American alone, 9.27% (16,243) Asian alone, 0.31% (549) Pacific Islander alone, 38.04% (66,663) Other Race alone, and 19.54% (24,249) Multiracial or Mixed Race.

According to the 2020 U.S. census, the racial and ethnic makeup (where Hispanics are excluded from the racial counts and placed in their own category) was 13.69% (23,997) White alone (non-Hispanic), 5.90% (10,336) Black alone (non-Hispanic), 0.23% (409) Native American alone (non-Hispanic), 8.95% (15,693) Asian alone (non-Hispanic), 0.24% (415) Pacific Islander alone (non-Hispanic), 0.53% (933) Other Race alone (non-Hispanic), 2.03% (3,554) Multiracial or Mixed Race (non-Hispanic), and 68.43% (119,928) Hispanic or Latino.

The population was 175,265, and the population density was 3,507.3 inhabitants per square mile (1,354.2/km^{2}).

The census reported that 99.4% of the population lived in households, 0.4% lived in non-institutionalized group quarters, and 0.2% were institutionalized.

There were 51,312 households, out of which 43.4% included children under the age of 18, 49.9% were married-couple households, 8.1% were cohabiting couple households, 25.5% had a female householder with no partner present, and 16.5% had a male householder with no partner present. 15.0% of households were one person, and 5.3% were one person aged 65 or older. The average household size was 3.4. There were 40,617 families (79.2% of all households).

The age distribution was 24.7% under the age of 18, 10.2% aged 18 to 24, 30.6% aged 25 to 44, 23.8% aged 45 to 64, and 10.6% who were 65 years of age or older. The median age was 34.0 years. For every 100 females, there were 96.9 males.

There were 53,219 housing units at an average density of 1,065.0 units per square mile (411.2 units/km^{2}), of which 51,312 (96.4%) were occupied. Of these, 54.7% were owner-occupied, and 45.3% were occupied by renters.

In 2023, the US Census Bureau estimated that the median household income in 2023 was $82,806, and the per capita income was $31,141. About 10.7% of families and 12.7% of the population were below the poverty line.

=== 2010 ===
The 2010 United States census reported that Ontario had a population of 163,924. The population density was 3,278.1 inhabitants per square mile (1,265.7/km^{2}). The racial makeup of Ontario was 83,683 (51.0%) White (18.2% Non-Hispanic White), 10,561 (6.4%) African American, 1,686 (1.0%) Native American, 8,453 (5.2%) Asian, 514 (0.3%) Pacific Islander, 51,373 (31.3%) from other races, and 7,654 (4.7%) from two or more races. Hispanic or Latino of any race were 113,085 persons (69.0%).

The Census reported that 163,166 people (99.5% of the population) lived in households, 411 (0.3%) lived in non-institutionalized group quarters, and 347 (0.2%) were institutionalized.

There were 44,931 households, out of which 23,076 (51.4%) had children under the age of 18 living in them, 23,789 (52.9%) were opposite-sex married couples living together, 7,916 (17.6%) had a female householder with no husband present, 3,890 (8.7%) had a male householder with no wife present. There were 3,470 (7.7%) unmarried opposite-sex partnerships, and 384 (0.9%) same-sex married couples or partnerships. 6,741 households (15.0%) were made up of individuals, and 2,101 (4.7%) had someone living alone who was 65 years of age or older. The average household size was 3.63. There were 35,595 families (79.2% of all households); the average family size was 3.98.

The population was spread out, with 49,443 people (30.2%) under the age of 18, 19,296 people (11.8%) aged 18 to 24, 49,428 people (30.2%) aged 25 to 44, 34,703 people (21.2%) aged 45 to 64, and 11,054 people (6.7%) who were 65 years of age or older. The median age was 29.9 years. For every 100 females, there were 99.0 males. For every 100 females age 18 and over, there were 96.8 males.

There were 47,449 housing units at an average density of 948.9 units per square mile (366.4 units/km^{2}), of which 24,832 (55.3%) were owner-occupied, and 20,099 (44.7%) were occupied by renters. The homeowner vacancy rate was 2.0%; the rental vacancy rate was 5.8%. 90,864 people (55.4% of the population) lived in owner-occupied housing units and 72,302 people (44.1%) lived in rental housing units.

During 2009–2013, Ontario had a median household income of $54,249, with 18.1% of the population living below the federal poverty line.

== Economy ==
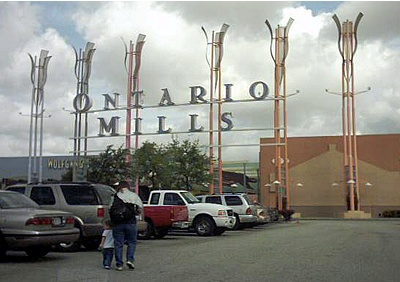
Ontario Mills in 2005

In the years following Ontario's founding, the economy was driven by its reputation as a health resort. Shortly thereafter, citrus farmers began taking advantage of Ontario's rocky soil to plant lemon and orange groves. Agricultural opportunities also attracted vintners and olive growers. The Graber Olive House, which continues to produce olives, is a city historical landmark and one of the oldest institutions in Ontario. Dairy farming is also prevalent, as it continues to be in neighboring Chino. Much of southern Ontario still contains dairy farms and other agricultural farms. However, the area is currently under planning to be developed into a mixed-use area of residential homes, industrial and business parks, and town centers, collectively known as the New Model Colony.

A major pre-war industry was the city's General Electric plant that produced clothing irons. During and after World War II, Ontario experienced a housing boom common to many suburbs. The expansion of the Southern California defense industry attracted many settlers to the city. With California's aerospace industry concentrated in Los Angeles and the Bay Area, the Ontario International Airport was used as a pilot training center. Today, Ontario still has a manufacturing industry, the most notable firm being flashlight manufacturer Maglite. Manufacturing has waned, and Ontario's economy is dominated by service industries and warehousing. Major distribution centers are operated by companies such as AutoZone, Cardinal Health, MBM, Genuine Parts/NAPA, and Nordstrom.

Ontario is also home to Niagara Bottling, The Icee Company, clothing companies Famous Stars and Straps and Shiekh Shoes, Scripto U.S.A., and to Phoenix Motorcars, who employs over 150 employees in Ontario.

=== Top employers ===
According to the city's 2023 Annual Comprehensive Financial Report, the top employers in the city are:

#	Employer	# of employees
1	Ontario International Airport	5,000–9,999
2	United Parcel Service (UPS)	5,000–9,999
3	Workforce Personnel, Inc	5,000–9,999
4	Chaffey Union High School	1,000–4,999
5	City of Ontario	1,000–4,999
6	Ontario-Montclair School District	1,000–4,999
7	Primary Care Assoc Med Group	1,000–4,999
8	FedEx	500–999
9	The Home Depot	500–999
10	QVC, Inc	500–999

=== Tourism ===
The Greater Ontario Convention and Visitors Bureau implemented a tourism marketing district and adopted an aggressive five-year strategic plan focusing on marketing initiatives to bring visitors to the region, build brand and destination awareness while enhancing the local economy.

== Arts and culture ==
Ontario is home to three museums, the Ontario Museum of History and Art, the Chaffey Community Museum of Art, and the Ontario Police Museum.

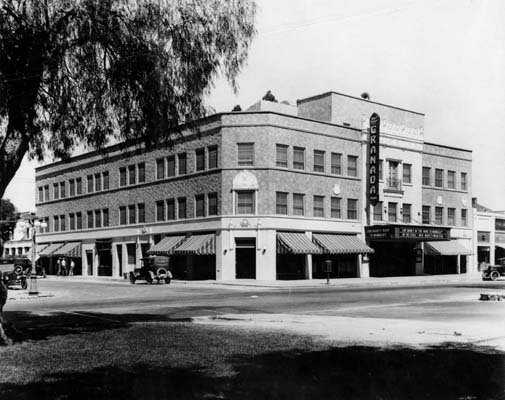
Granada Theatre, c. 1940

Built in 1925, The Granada Theatre was leased to West Coast Junior Theater. By the 1940s, the theater had become part of the Fox West Coast Theater chain. The Granada Theatre was designed by architect L.A. Smith.

Ontario is also the home to the second largest consumer quilt show in the US, Road to California. The quilt show books over 2,400 room nights and has a recorded attendance of over 40,000 attendees.

The Ontario post office contains two oil on canvas murals, The Dream depicting founder Chaffey with surveyors and The Reality which shows a view of the completed Euclid Avenue, painted by WPA muralist Nellie Geraldine Best in 1942.

Since 1958, Ontario has placed three-dimensional nativity scenes on the median of Euclid Avenue during the Christmas season. The scenes, featuring statues by the sculptor Rudolph Vargas, were challenged in 1998 as a violation of church-state separation under the California Constitution by an atheist resident, but the dispute was resolved when private organizations began funding the storage and labor involved in the set-up and maintenance of the scenery in its entirety. To support the nativity scenes the Ontario Chamber of Commerce started a craft fair called "Christmas on Euclid".

The All-States Picnic, an Independence Day celebration, began in 1939 to recognize the varied origins of the city's residents. Picnic tables lined the median of Euclid Avenue from Hawthorne to E Street, with signs for each of the country's 48 states. The picnic was suspended during World War II, but when it resumed in 1948, it attracted 120,000 people. A 1941 Ripley's Believe It or Not! cartoon listed Ontario's picnic table as the "world's longest". As native Californians came to outnumber the out-of-state-born, the celebration waned in popularity until it was discontinued in 1981. It was revived in 1991 as a celebration of civic pride.

== Sports ==
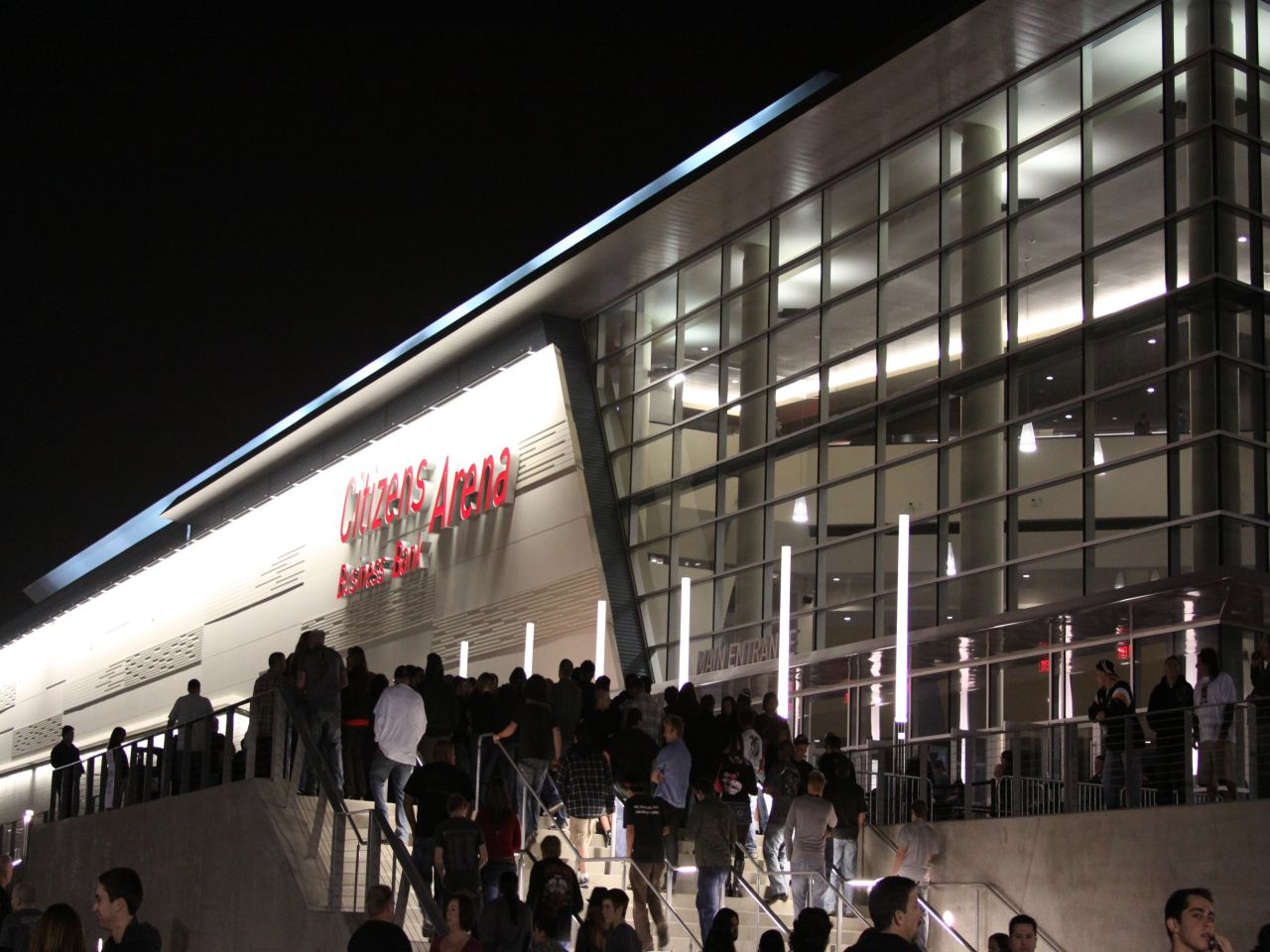
Toyota Arena

The Toyota Arena is a multipurpose arena which opened in late 2008. It is owned by Ontario, but is operated by SMG Worldwide. It is an 11,000-seat multi-purpose arena, the largest enclosed arena in the Inland Empire. Over 125 events are held annually featuring sporting competitions, concerts, and family shows.

The arena had been the home of the Ontario Reign, a former team in the ECHL, that called the arena home from 2008 to 2015. The Los Angeles Kings' affiliate played at the 9,736-seat Toyota Arena. In their debut season of 2008–09, they were second in the league in attendance, averaging 5856 fans per game. The Reign led the ECHL in average attendance in every subsequent year.

In January 2015, the American Hockey League, a minor league above the ECHL, announced that it was forming a new Pacific Division and would be replacing the ECHL Ontario Reign with a relocated team. The Kings relocated the Manchester Monarchs, a franchise they had owned and operated since 2012, and became the Ontario Reign beginning with the 2015–16 AHL season.

The Ontario Motor Speedway was located in Ontario, and held races for USAC, Formula One, NHRA, and NASCAR. It was demolished in 1980 after the Chevron Land Company bought the property.

Club	League	Venue	Established	Championships
Empire Strykers	MASL, Indoor soccer	Toyota Arena	2013	0
Ontario Reign	American Hockey League, Ice hockey	Toyota Arena	2015	1
Ontario Tower Buzzers	California League, Baseball	ONT Field	2025	0

== Government ==
=== Local government ===
The city is governed by a five-member council.

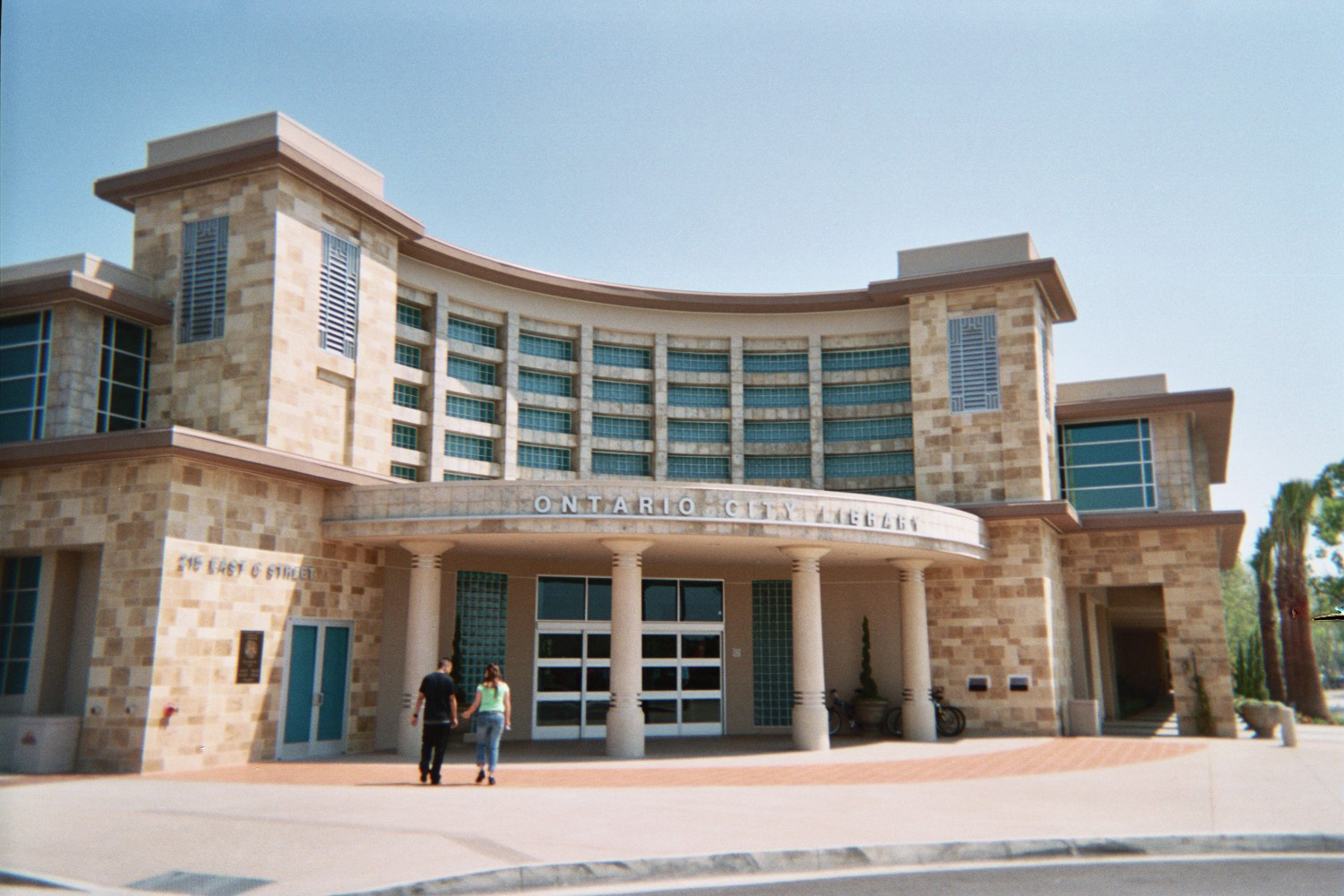
Ontario City Library in 2006

According to the 2009 Comprehensive Annual Financial Report, the city's various funds had $399.4 million in revenues, $305.3 million in expenditures, $1,606.0 million in total assets, $317.6 million in total liabilities, and $412.4 million in cash and investments.

=== State and federal representation ===
In the California State Legislature, Ontario is in the 22nd senatorial district, represented by Democrat Susan Rubio, and in the 53rd Assembly District by Democrat Michelle Rodriguez.

In the United States House of Representatives, Ontario is in California's 35th congressional district, represented by Democrat Norma Torres.

== Education ==
Ontario has five school districts: Ontario-Montclair School District, Mountain View School District, Cucamonga School District, Chino Valley Unified School District, and Chaffey Joint Union High School District within the City borders. There are also several private schools throughout the city as well as two private military schools. Ontario also has nine trade schools. The University of La Verne College of Law is located in downtown Ontario. National University, Argosy University, San Joaquin Valley College and Chapman University have a satellite campus near the Ontario Mills mall. Ontario Christian is located there. Gateway Seminary has a campus in Ontario.

== Infrastructure ==
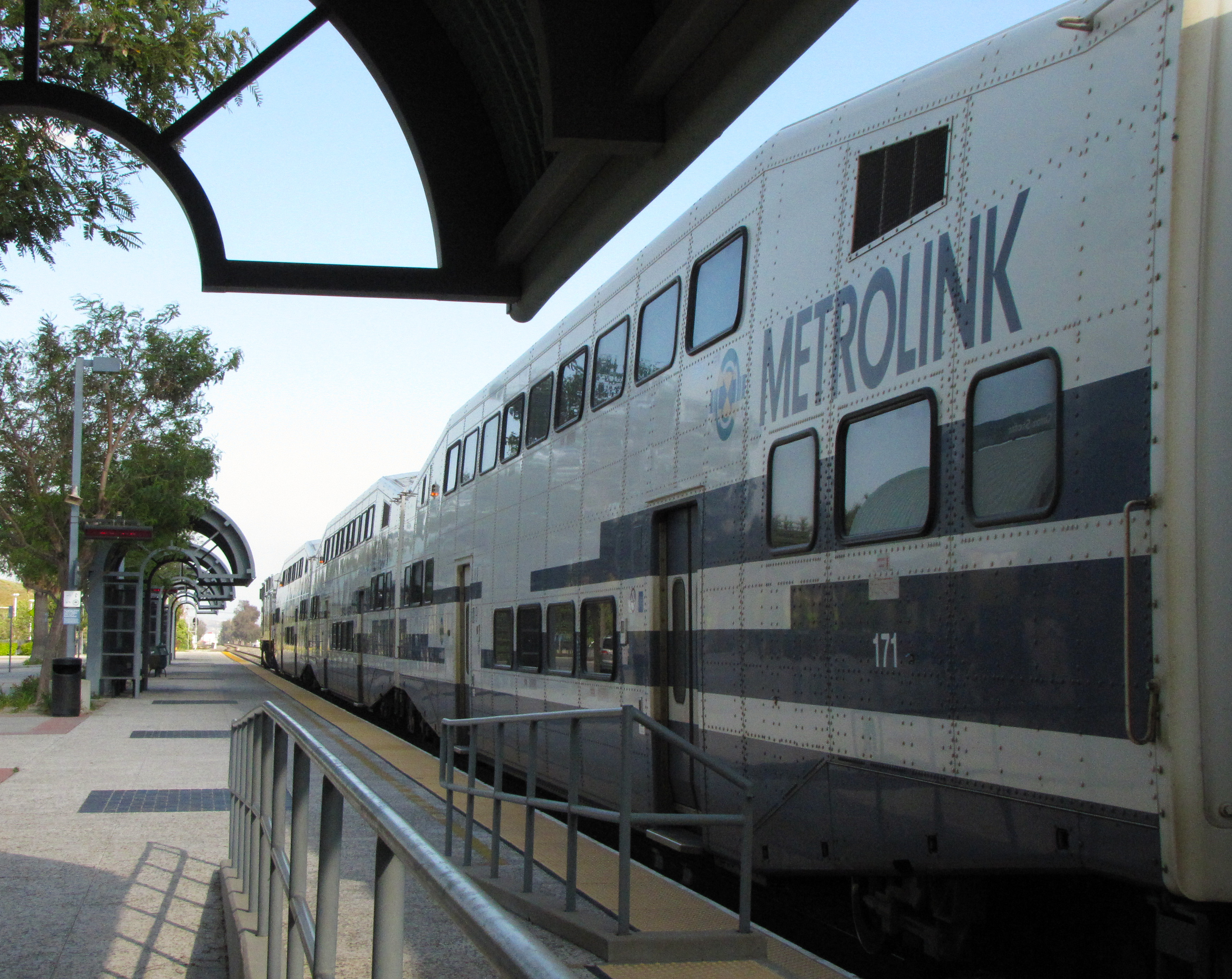
Metrolink train at the East Ontario Station

=== Transportation ===
The Ontario International Airport provides domestic and international air travel. Because of the many manufacturing companies and warehouses in the city, the airport also serves as a major hub for freight, especially for FedEx and UPS.

Because Ontario is a major hub for passengers and freight, the city is also served by several major freeways. Interstate 10 and the Pomona Freeway (State Route 60) run east–west through the city. Interstate 10 is north of the Ontario airport while the Pomona freeway is south of the airport. Interstate 15 runs in the north–south directions at the eastern side of the city. State Route 83, also known as Euclid Avenue, also runs in the north–south direction at the western side of the city.

The Amtrak station is serviced by the Sunset Limited and Texas Eagle lines. The Amtrak Thruway 19 provides twice daily connections from this station to/from Bakersfield to the north, and San Bernardino to the east, with several stops in between.

The Ontario-East Metrolink station is located off of Haven Avenue. It connects Ontario with much of the Greater Los Angeles area, Orange County, and the San Fernando Valley.

Public bus transportation is provided by Omnitrans. Additional bus and rail connections to Los Angeles and elsewhere are available at the nearby Montclair Transit Center. A bus rapid transit line known as the sbX Purple Line is currently being constructed, which will run through the city.

=== Cemeteries ===
The Bellevue Memorial Park is located on West G Street. Spanish–American War Congressional Medal of Honor recipient Frank Fulton Ross is buried there, as is George Chaffey, one of the two founders of the city.

=== Shopping ===
Ontario Mills is a major shopping mall in Ontario; it is also the largest outlet mall in all of California. Cardenas, a supermarket chain specializing in Latin American cuisine, was founded in and is based in Ontario.

== Notable people ==
- Hobie Alter, pioneer surfboard maker and catamaran builder
- Jeff Ayres, basketball player, NBA champion with the San Antonio Spurs
- Rod Barajas, MLB player for the Los Angeles Dodgers and six other MLB teams
- Madge Bellamy, actress
- Jim Brulte, politician
- Jason Bowles, stock car racing driver
- Eudora Stone Bumstead (1860–1892), poet, hymnwriter
- Henry Bumstead, Academy Award-winning cinematic art director and designer
- Beverly Cleary, author and Newbery Medal-winning novelist (1984), The Luckiest Girl and memoir My Own Two Feet
- Andy Clyde, actor, married in Ontario in 1932
- Del Crandall, MLB player and manager, 11-time All-Star, member of 1957 World Series champion Braves
- William De Los Santos, poet, screenwriter and film director
- Joseph Dippolito, former underboss of the Dragna crime family
- Landon Donovan, former Los Angeles Galaxy and USMNT player; born in Ontario, raised in Redlands
- Prince Fielder, baseball player for the Texas Rangers, Milwaukee Brewers, and Detroit Tigers
- José Carrera García, professional footballer
- Ana Patricia González, winner of Nuestra Belleza Latina 2010 (Our Latin Beauty 2010) and currently appearing on ¡Despierta América!
- Bill Graber, pole vaulter
- Robert Graettinger, composer
- Cle Kooiman, soccer player
- Ryan Lane, actor
- Nick Leyva, manager of the Philadelphia Phillies (1989–1991)
- Christina "T" Lopez, singer, actress; former member of Latin girl dance-pop band Soluna
- Sam Maloof, furniture designer and woodworker
- Shelly Martinez, professional wrestler
- Anthony Muñoz, 1998 Pro Football Hall of Fame inductee
- Al Newman, former MLB player
- Douglas Northway, Olympic bronze medalist, swimming
- Joan O'Brien, actress, graduate of Chaffey Union High School District
- Charles Phoenix, pop culture humorist, historian, author and chef
- Antonio Pierce, football player
- Sol Ruca, professional wrestler
- Joey Scarbury, singer
- Robert Shaw, conductor
- Mike Sweeney, MLB player for the Kansas City Royals, attended Ontario High School and led 1991 baseball team to undefeated record and state title
- Bobby Wagner, football player, attended Colony High School; middle Linebacker for the Super Bowl champions Seattle Seahawks
- Joseph Wambaugh, author
- Frank Zappa, musician, Rock and Roll Hall of Fame and Grammy Lifetime Achievement Award

== Sister cities ==
Ontario has five sister cities around the world. They are:

- Brockville, Ontario, Canada (since 1977)
- Guamúchil, Sinaloa, Mexico (since 1982)
- Mocorito, Sinaloa, Mexico (since 1982)
- Los Mochis, Sinaloa, Mexico (since 1988)
- Winterthur, Canton of Zürich, Switzerland (Note: However, according to the official website by the city of Winterthur, Ontario is not one of its partner cities.)
- Jieyang, China

== See also ==
- Inland Valley Daily Bulletin (newspaper)
- Ontario and San Antonio Heights Railroad Company
- The Daily Report (newspaper)
- List of U.S. cities with large Hispanic populations
- Greater Los Angeles Area
- Inland Empire Metropolitan Area
