= Upland–Ontario Line =

Pacific Electric streetcar line (1912–1926)

Upland–Ontario

Overview
- Locale: Los Angeles County, California
- Termini: Pomona; Ontario

Service
- Type: Streetcar
- System: Pacific Electric
- Operator(s): Pacific Electric

History
- Opened: 1912
- Closed: October 6, 1928

Technical
- Track gauge: 1,435 mm (4 ft 8 1/2 in) standard gauge
- Electrification: Overhead line, 600 V DC

The Upland–Ontario Line is a former Pacific Electric streetcar line in San Bernardino County, California. Cars did not travel to Downtown Los Angeles and instead provided a local service between Ontario and Upland with through service to Pomona.

== History ==
Pacific Electric acquired the Ontario and San Antonio Heights Railroad Company on April 13, 1912, bringing their Euclid Avenue Line in Upland as well as their branch to Pomona into the interurban network. Connections to main line steam trains were made at Ontario Southern Pacific Station. The Ontario–Upland Line was officially interlined with service to Pomona via North Pomona until 1918, after which Pacific Electric no longer advertised the route as such. The line operated with an irregular schedule between Ontario and Upland until service was abandoned after October 6, 1928.
