= Montclair Transit Center =

Intermodal transit center

Montclair
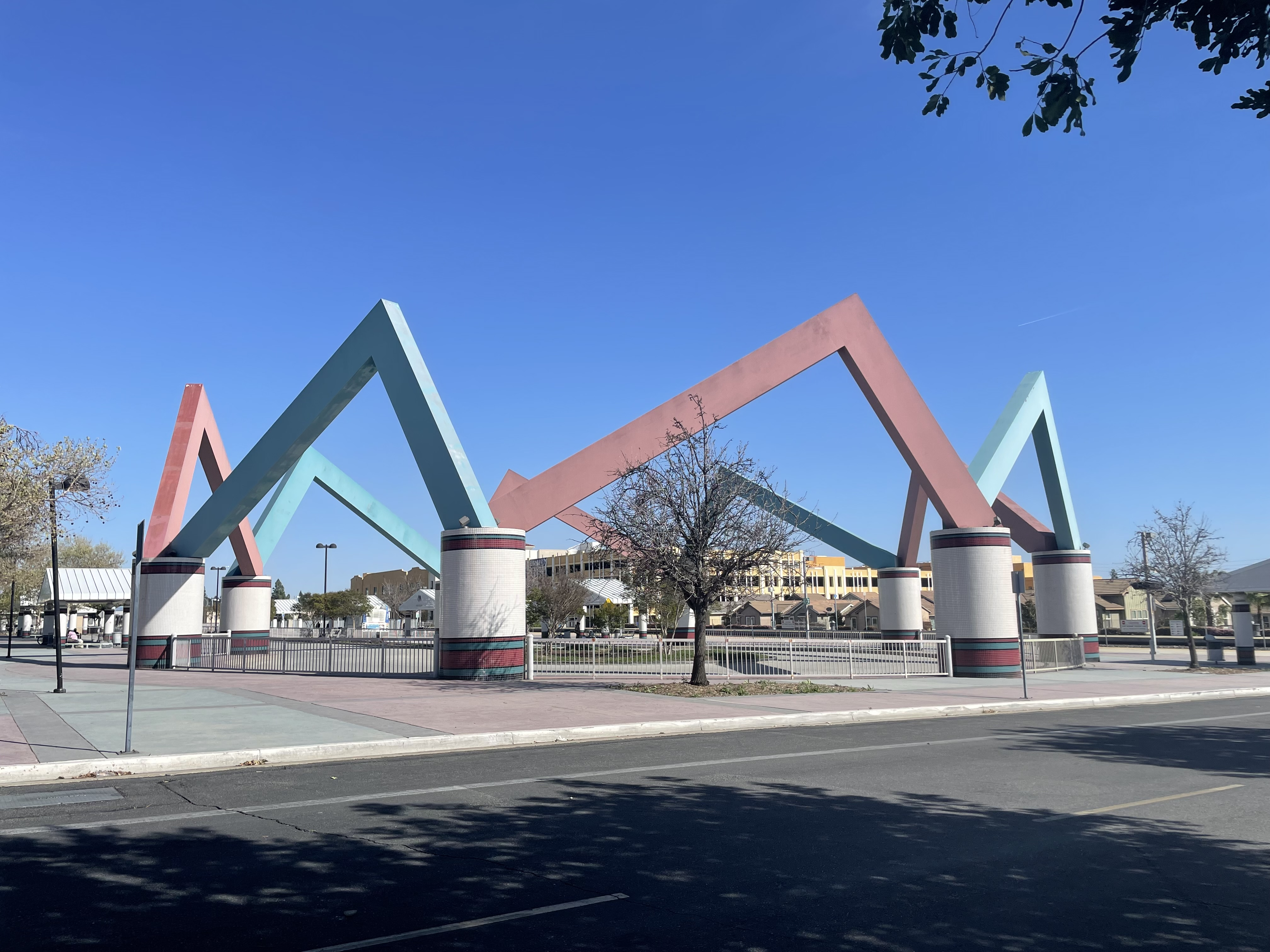
- Montclair Transit Center in 2025

General information
- Location: 5091 Richton Street; Montclair, California; United States
- Coordinates: 34.0940°N 117.6962°W
- Owner: City of Montclair, State of California, San Bernardino County Transportation Authority
- Line: SCRRA San Gabriel Subdivision
- Platforms: 2 side platforms
- Tracks: 2
- Connections: Foothill Transit: Silver Streak, 188, 197, 480, 492, 699; Omnitrans: 66, 84, 85, 88; Riverside Transit Agency: 204

Construction
- Parking: 1,600 spaces, 32 accessible spaces
- Accessible: Yes

History
- Opened: February 22, 1993

Passengers
- FY 2026: 261 (avg. wkdy boardings)

Services
Preceding station	Metrolink	Following station
Claremont toward L.A. Union Station	San Bernardino Line	Upland toward San Bernardino or Redlands
Preceding station	Foothill Transit	Following station
Pomona Transit Center (stops en route) toward Downtown Los Angeles	Silver Streak	Terminus
Location

The Montclair Transit Center (also known as the Montclair Transcenter) is an intermodal transit center located at 5091 Richton Street in Montclair, California. It is located between Central and Monte Vista Avenues on Richton Street, just north of the Montclair Plaza shopping center.

The Montclair Transit Center is served by 32 Metrolink San Bernardino Line trains (16 in each direction) on weekdays, between 4:25 a.m. and 10:39 p.m. Weekend train service is less: 16 trains (8 in each direction) on Saturdays and Sundays between 7:18 a.m. and 10:40 p.m.

The transit center is jointly owned by the City of Montclair, Caltrans, and the San Bernardino County Transportation Authority. Caltrans owns all of the parking spaces, while Montclair and SBCTA jointly own the transit center and Metrolink platform. Omnitrans, Foothill Transit, and the Riverside Transit Agency all provide bus service, with Foothill and RTA providing express service, Foothill providing bus rapid transit service via the Silver Streak, and Foothill and Omnitrans providing local service. It is also a station on the Metrolink San Bernardino Line.

The station serves as the dividing line between Foothill's service area to the west, and Omnitrans' service area to the east. Both agencies accept each other's passes for one transfer outbound from the station.

Greyhound moved to the transit center in 2022 from a location in neighboring Claremont, as part of its transition away from company-operated facilities. The move caused controversy on the Montclair City Council, with one member falsely claiming that the Claremont Greyhound station was a magnet for crime, which was refuted by the city manager and rebuked by other council members. A child care center also operated at the transit center, until it was closed during the COVID-19 pandemic.

The FlixBus boards from the nearby Montclair Plaza mall, at Moreno Street and Lindero Avenue.

Phase 2B of the Foothill Extension project proposes to eventually extend the Los Angeles Metro Rail system east to the Montclair Transit Center. In 2017, Los Angeles Metro board of directors initially approved to extend the A Line (then the Gold Line) to Claremont station in Claremont. However, officials in San Bernardino County convinced planners to further continue the extension east to the Montclair Transit Center, saying the transit center made for a natural terminus for the line. By 2024, SBCTA set aside $80 million in funding to directly fund the construction of the segment of the extension within San Bernardino County. However, at a board meeting on September 3, 2025, the SBCTA board of directors voted to divest what it had allocated, redirecting the funds to other uses due to rising costs and limited local input. The decision placed the Claremont–Montclair segment on indefinite hold. At its January 14, 2026 meeting, Metro's Construction Committee approved $94 million in funding for design and engineering on the Pomona–Claremont segment.
