= Upland station =

Train station

Upland
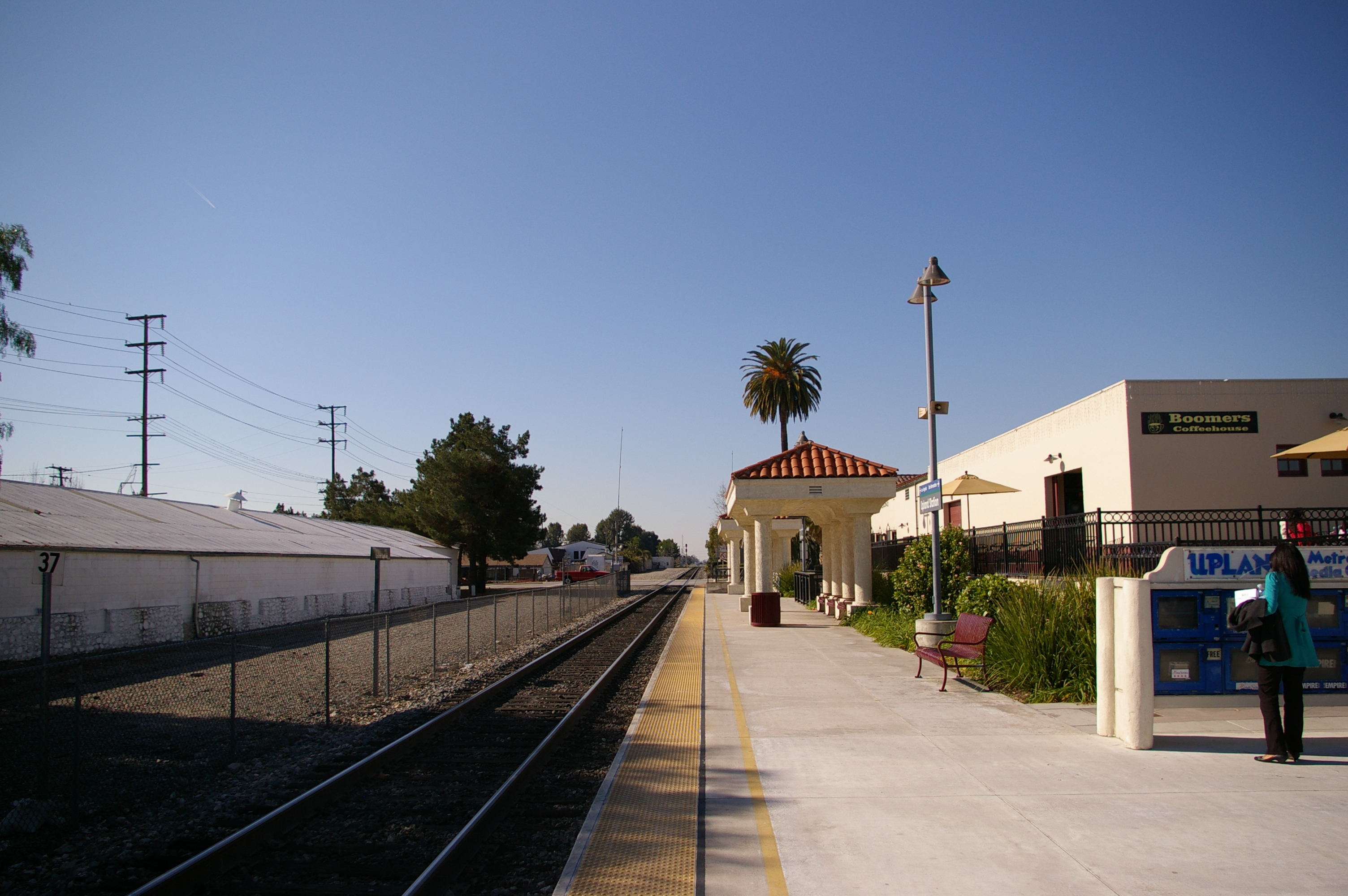
- Upland station in 2008

General information
- Location: 300 East A Street; Upland, California
- Coordinates: 34.0945°N 117.6474°W
- Owner: City of Upland
- Line: SCRRA San Gabriel Subdivision
- Platforms: 1 side platform
- Tracks: 1
- Connections: Omnitrans: 83

Construction
- Parking: 294 paid spaces, 14 accessible spaces
- Cycle facilities: Racks, lockers
- Accessible: Yes

History
- Opened: May 17, 1993

Passengers
- FY 2026: 287 (avg. wkdy boardings)

Services
Preceding station	Metrolink	Following station
Montclair toward L.A. Union Station	San Bernardino Line	Rancho Cucamonga toward San Bernardino or Redlands
Location

Upland station is a railway station at 300 East A Street in Upland, California, just east of Euclid Avenue. It has a park and ride lot with 308 paid spaces. The station is part of the Metrolink commuter railway's San Bernardino Line. The station is owned by the City of Upland.

The Upland station is served by 32 Metrolink San Bernardino Line trains (16 in each direction) on weekdays, between 4:19 a.m. and 10:54 p.m. Weekend train service is less: 16 trains (8 in each direction) on Saturdays and Sundays between 7:12 a.m. and 10:45 p.m.

Omnitrans does not directly serve the station, but runs route 83 along Euclid Avenue, about two blocks away from the platform.
