= Laguna Niguel/Mission Viejo station =

Passenger train station in Laguna Niguel, California, United States

Laguna Niguel/Mission Viejo
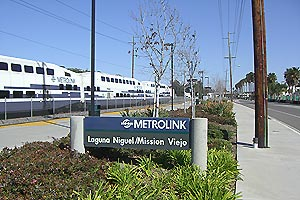
- Metrolink train at Laguna Niguel/Mission Viejo in 2008

General information
- Location: 28200 Forbes Road; Laguna Niguel, California
- Coordinates: 33.5537°N 117.6741°W
- Owner: City of Laguna Niguel and Orange County Transportation Authority
- Line: SCRRA Orange Subdivision
- Platforms: 2 side platforms, 1 bay platform
- Tracks: 3
- Connections: OC Bus: 85, 91, OC Flex; Mission Viejo Shuttle

Construction
- Parking: 460 spaces, 9 accessible spaces
- Cycle facilities: Racks and lockers
- Accessible: Yes

History
- Opened: April 19, 2002

Passengers
- FY 2026: 197 (avg. wkdy boardings)

Services
Preceding station	Metrolink	Following station
Irvine toward San Bernardino–Downtown	Inland Empire–Orange County Line	San Juan Capistrano toward Oceanside
Irvine toward L.A. Union Station	Orange County Line	San Juan Capistrano toward Oceanside
Former services
Preceding station	Amtrak	Following station
Irvine toward San Luis Obispo	Pacific Surfliner	San Juan Capistrano toward San Diego
Location

Laguna Niguel/Mission Viejo station is a station on the Inland Empire–Orange County Line and Orange County Line of the Metrolink commuter rail system around Southern California, United States.

Some Metrolink trains terminate here and the station has an additional siding track with a side platform east of the mainline tracks to store these trains.

== Hours and frequency ==
Laguna Niguel/Mission Viejo station is served by 24 Metrolink Orange County Line trains (12 in each direction) each weekday, evenly spaced throughout the day. Weekend service consists of 4 trains (2 in each direction) on both Saturday and Sunday, running in each direction in the morning and evening. Additionally, the station is served by 13 Metrolink Inland Empire–Orange County Line trains (7 northbound and 6 southbound) each weekday running primarily at peak hours in the peak direction of travel. Weekend service consists of 4 trains (2 in each direction) on both Saturday and Sunday, heading towards Orange County in the morning and towards the Inland Empire in the evening.
