= Commerce station =

Commerce station could refer to:

- Commerce station (California), a railway station in Commerce, California
- Commerce station (Paris Metro), a metro station on the Paris Metro
