= Buena Park (disambiguation) =

Buena Park is a city in Orange County, California, United States.

Buena Park may also refer to:

- Buena Park station, a commuter rail station in Buena Park, California
- Buena Park, Chicago, Illinois
- Buena Park, Wisconsin, an unincorporated community
