= Inland Empire–Orange County Line =

Commuter rail line in Southern California

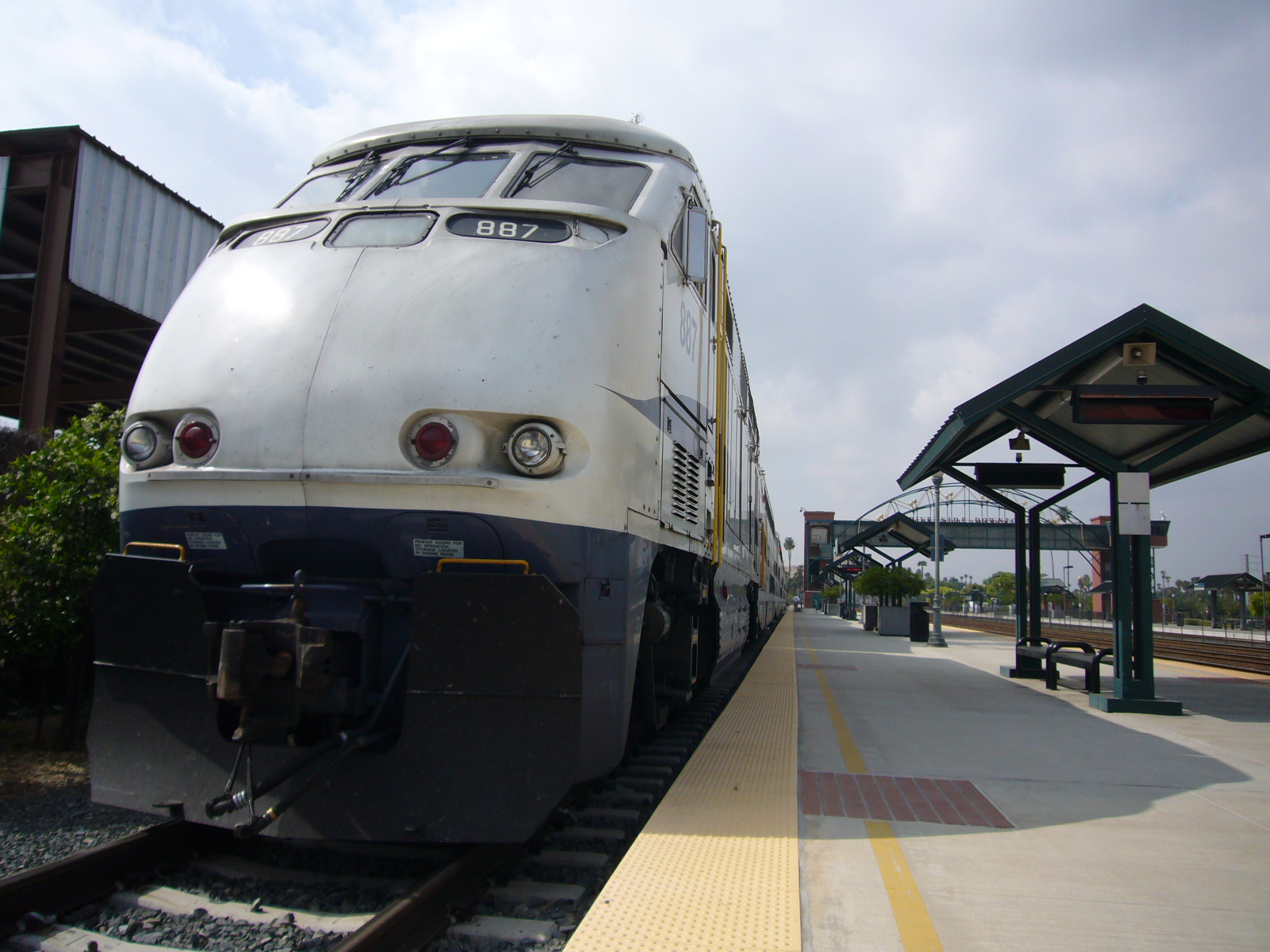
- Metrolink train in Riverside

Overview
- Owner: SCRRA (San Bernardino Downtown-Colton) (Anaheim Canyon–OC/SD County Line (Note: Tracks only, land is owned by OCTA)); BNSF (Colton–Anaheim Canyon); NCTD (OC/SD County Line–Oceanside)
- Locale: Inland Empire, Orange County, and San Diego County
- Termini: San Bernardino–Downtown; Oceanside
- Stations: 16

Service
- Type: Commuter rail line
- System: Metrolink
- Operator: Metrolink
- Daily ridership: 2,462 (weekdays, Q3 2025)

History
- Opened: October 2, 1995
- Extended from Riverside to San Bernardino–Depot: March 4, 1996
- Extended to San Bernardino–Downtown: December 16, 2017

Technical
- Line length: 100.1 miles (161.1 km)
- Character: Elevated and surface-level
- Track gauge: 4 ft 8 1/2 in (1,435 mm) standard gauge
- Operating speed: 90 mph (140 km/h) (top); 39 mph (63 km/h) (average)
Route map
Inland Empire–Orange County Line highlighted in maroon

The Inland Empire–Orange County (IEOC) Line is a commuter rail line run by Metrolink in Southern California. It runs from San Bernardino through Orange County to Oceanside in northern San Diego County. When the line opened it became the first Metrolink line not to serve Union Station in Los Angeles nor cross the Los Angeles River and was the only line until the Arrow service opened in October 2022. The line was also the first suburb-to-suburb commuter rail line in the United States. It runs for 100.1 miles (161.1 km), making it the system's longest line.

The IEOC Line, Metrolink's sixth line to be introduced, opened between Riverside and Irvine on October 2, 1995. Following the completion of track improvements the line opened to San Bernardino on March 4, 1996. With the exception of the Anaheim Canyon station, the line shares all of its stations with the 91/Perris Valley Line, the Orange County Line, the Riverside Line, or the San Bernardino Line.

As of July 2016, eight trains in each direction serve the stations from San Bernardino - Downtown to Laguna Niguel/Mission Viejo on weekdays. The remainder of the trains servicing the IEOC Line cover more to all of the stations, except San Clemente Pier, which is only serviced on the weekends.

In July 2006, the Orange County Transportation Authority created weekend service on the IEOC and Orange County Lines. As of August 2016, the IEOC Line schedule has two trains on Saturday and two on Sunday, each servicing every station, including San Clemente Pier.

Metrolink's Downtown San Bernardino extension to San Bernardino Transit Center opened on December 16, 2017.

== Stations ==
Station	Connections	Location	
San Bernardino–Downtown	Metrolink: Arrow San Bernardino	San Bernardino	San Bernardino County
San Bernardino–Depot	Metrolink: San Bernardino; Amtrak: Southwest Chief	San Bernardino	San Bernardino County
Riverside–Downtown	Metrolink: 91/Perris Valley Riverside; Amtrak: Southwest Chief	Riverside	Riverside County
Riverside–La Sierra	Metrolink: 91/Perris Valley	Riverside	Riverside County
Corona–North Main	Metrolink: 91/Perris Valley	Corona	Riverside County
Corona–West	Metrolink: 91/Perris Valley	Corona	Riverside County
Anaheim Canyon		Anaheim	Orange County
Orange	Metrolink: Orange County	Orange	Orange County
Santa Ana	Metrolink: Orange County; Amtrak: Pacific Surfliner	Santa Ana	Orange County
Tustin	Metrolink: Orange County	Tustin	Orange County
Irvine	Metrolink: Orange County; Amtrak: Pacific Surfliner	Irvine	Orange County
Laguna Niguel/Mission Viejo	Metrolink: Orange County	Laguna Niguel	Orange County
San Juan Capistrano	Metrolink: Orange County; Amtrak: Pacific Surfliner	San Juan Capistrano	Orange County
San Clemente	Metrolink: Orange County	San Clemente	Orange County
San Clemente Pier (weekends)	Metrolink: Orange County; Amtrak: Pacific Surfliner	San Clemente	Orange County
Oceanside	Metrolink: Orange County; Amtrak: Pacific Surfliner; Coaster; Sprinter	Oceanside	San Diego County
