= Santa Ana Regional Transportation Center =

Transit center in Santa Ana, California, United States

Santa Ana
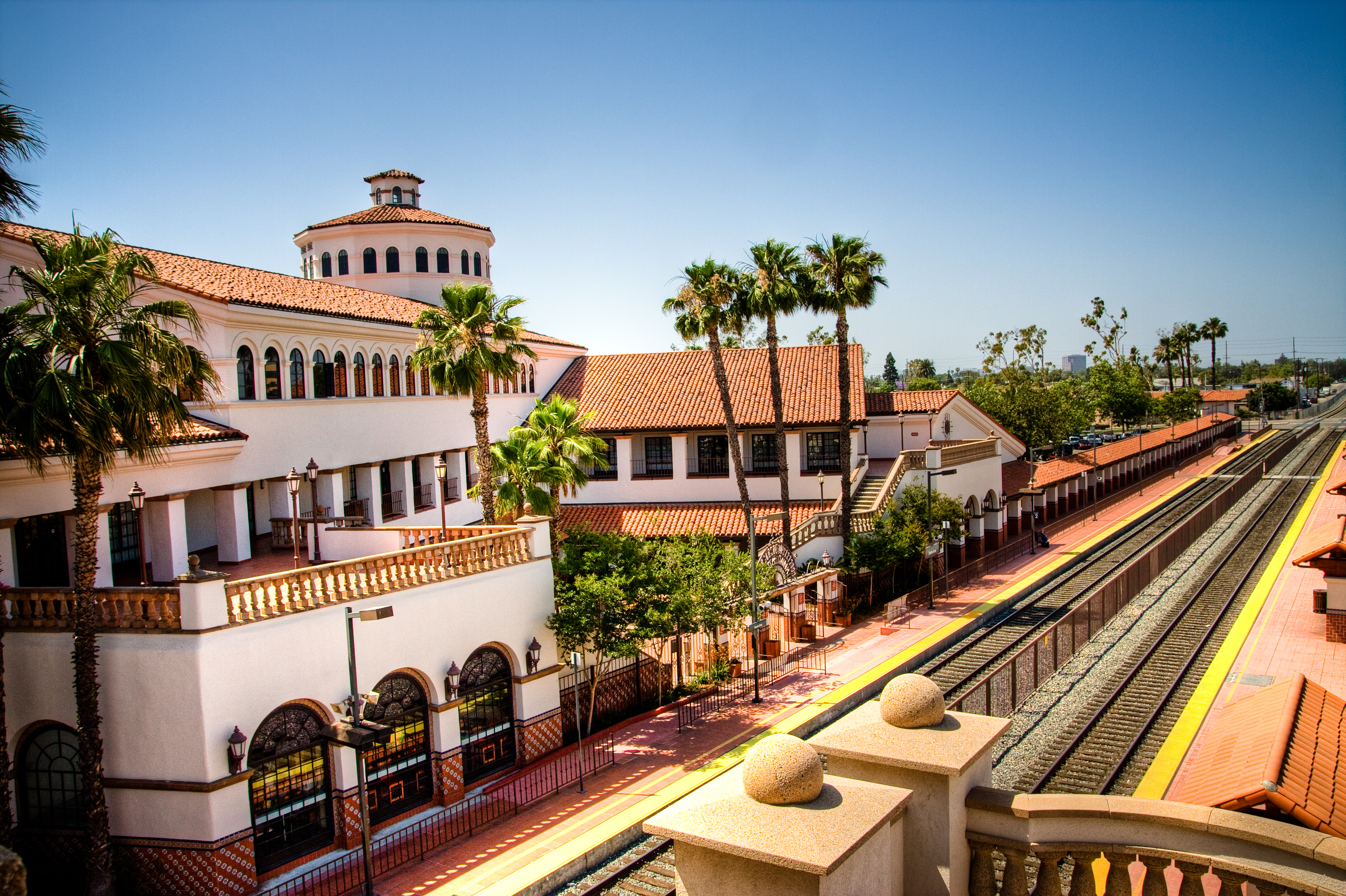
- Santa Ana station, 2008

General information
- Other names: Santa Ana Transit Center; Santa Ana
- Location: 1000 East Santa Ana Boulevard; Santa Ana, California
- Coordinates: 33°45′06″N 117°51′23″W
- Owner: City of Santa Ana
- Line: SCRRA Orange Subdivision
- Platforms: 2 side platforms
- Tracks: 2
- Train operators: Metrolink and Amtrak
- Connections: OC Bus: 59, 83, Rapid 560, 862; Crucero USA; Greyhound Lines

Construction
- Parking: 578 spaces, 13 accessible spaces
- Cycle facilities: Racks and lockers
- Accessible: Yes
- Architect: The Blurock Partnership
- Architectural style: Mediterranean Revival/Spanish Colonial Revival

Other information
- Status: Staffed, station building with waiting room
- Station code: Amtrak: SNA

History
- Opened: September 7, 1985

Passengers
- FY 2025: 109,990 annually (Amtrak)
- FY 2026: 407 weekday boardings (Metrolink)

Services
Preceding station	Amtrak	Following station
Anaheim toward San Luis Obispo	Pacific Surfliner	Irvine toward San Diego
Preceding station	Metrolink	Following station
Orange toward San Bernardino–Downtown	Inland Empire–Orange County Line	Tustin toward Oceanside
Orange toward L.A. Union Station	Orange County Line	Tustin toward Oceanside
Future services
Preceding station	OCTA	Following station
Lacy Street toward Harbor Transit Center	OC Streetcar	Terminus
Former services
Preceding station	Atchison, Topeka and Santa Fe Railway	Following station
Orange toward Los Angeles	Surf Line	El Toro toward San Diego
Orange toward Los Angeles	Surf Line	Irvine Until 1947 toward San Diego
Location

The Santa Ana Regional Transportation Center (shortened to Santa Ana Transit Center and also known as Santa Ana station) is a transit center in Santa Ana, California, United States. It is used by Amtrak's Pacific Surfliner and Metrolink's Orange County Line and Inland Empire–Orange County Line trains. It is also a Greyhound station and a hub for the Orange County Transportation Authority bus system as well as a terminal for international bus services to Mexico.

== History ==
The Santa Ana Regional Transportation Center was preceded by several earlier buildings.

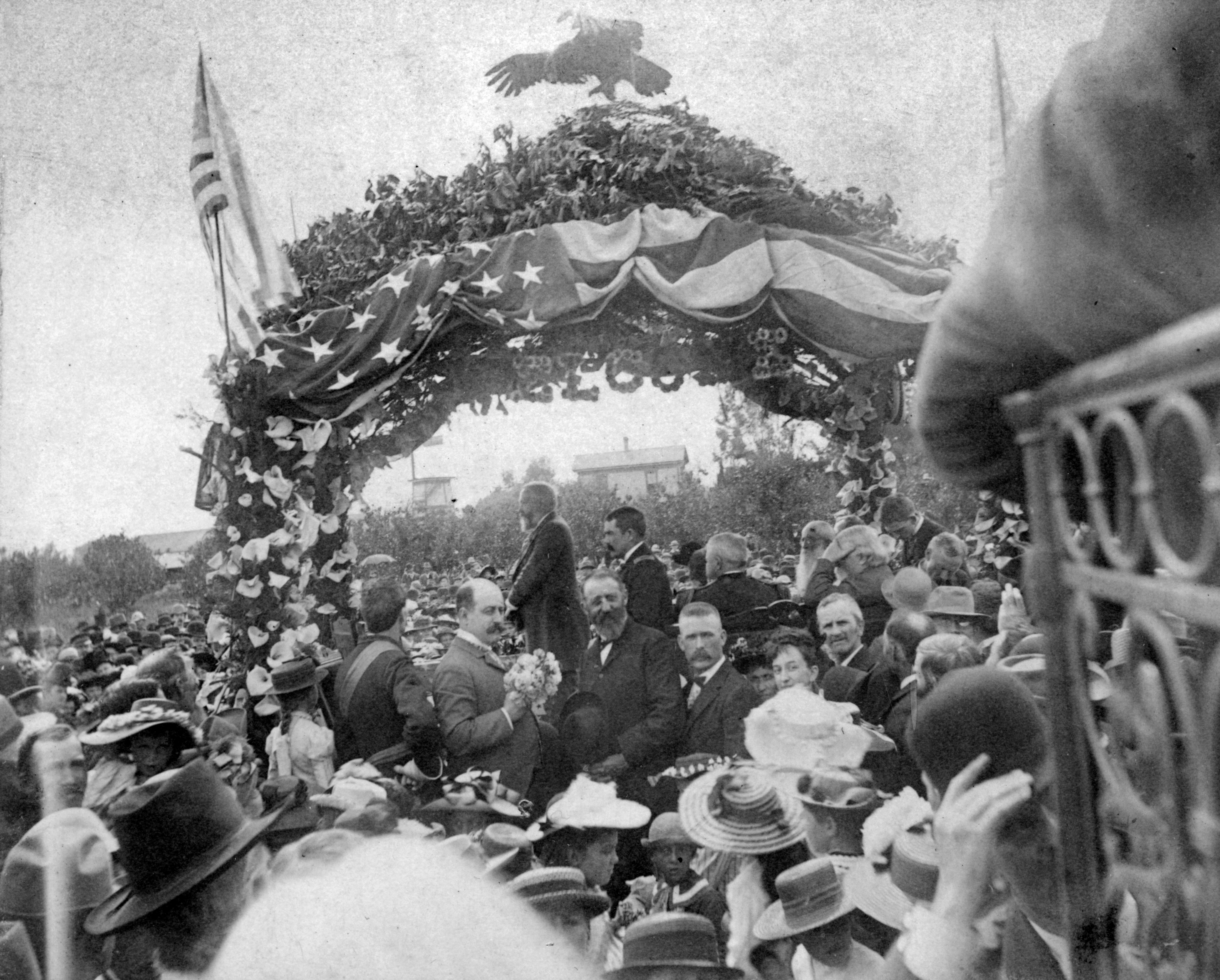
Reception of President Benjamin Harrison at the Santa Ana train station; April 23, 1891

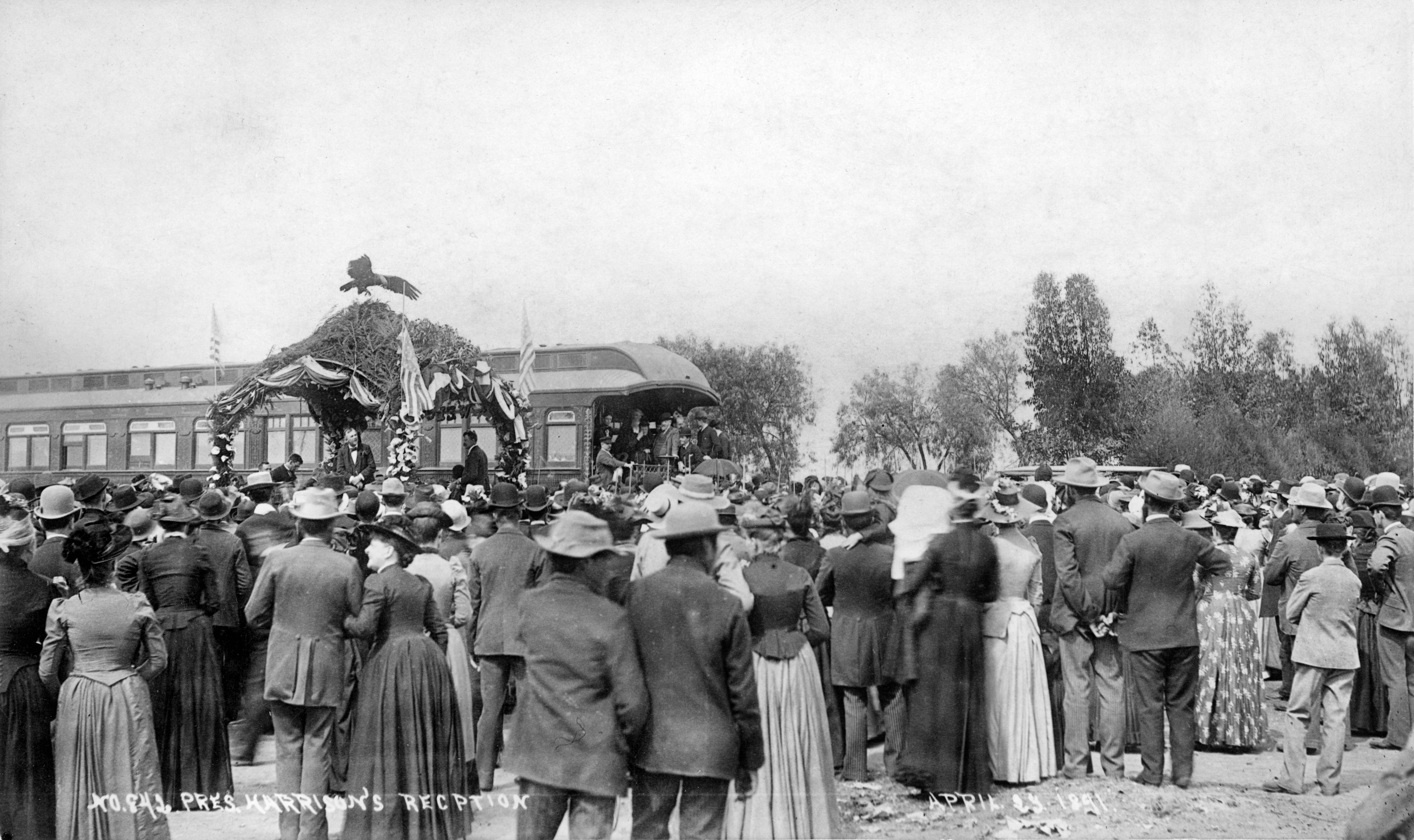
Reception of President Benjamin Harrison at the Santa Ana train station; April 23, 1891

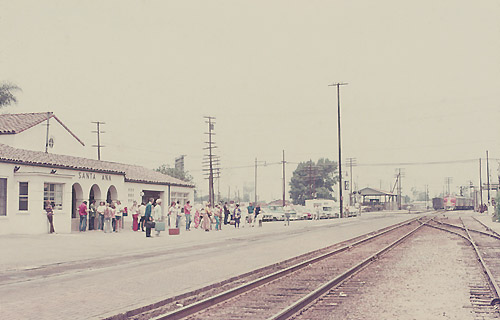
Santa Ana station, July 1973

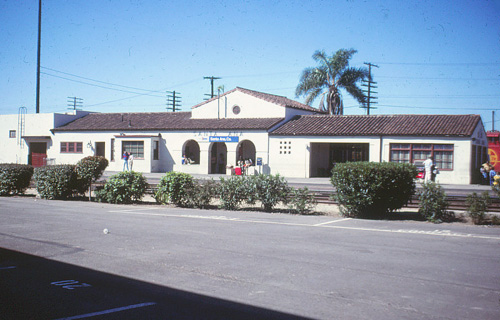
Santa Ana station, April 1981

When the current station opened on September 7, 1985, it was the largest new rail station built in the United States since the completion of the New Orleans Union Passenger Terminal circa 1955. The center was erected on the site of a former Atchison, Topeka and Santa Fe Railway combination depot that had been constructed in 1939 and closed in 1982. The station, which cost approximately $17 million, was funded by the U.S. Department of Transportation, Caltrans, and the city of Santa Ana.

In FY2010 Santa Ana was the 22nd-busiest of Amtrak's 73 California stations, boarding or detraining an average of about 420 passengers daily.

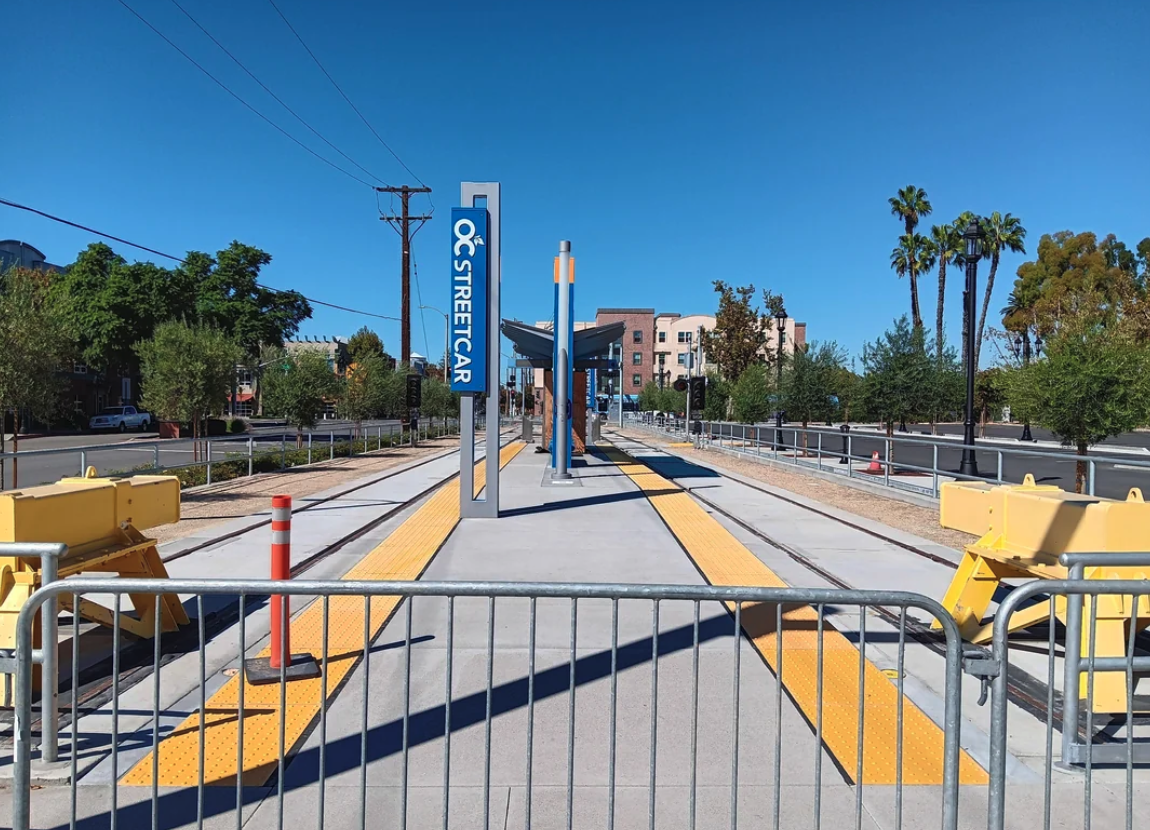
The OC Streetcar platform, just outside the main tracks.

=== Future service ===
Santa Ana Regional Transportation Center will be the eastern terminus of the OC Streetcar, a 4.15-mile (6.68 km) streetcar line through Downtown Santa Ana, a major regional employment area, to a new transit center and Park and Ride in Garden Grove at Harbor Boulevard and Westminster Avenue (both major bus corridors).

== Design ==
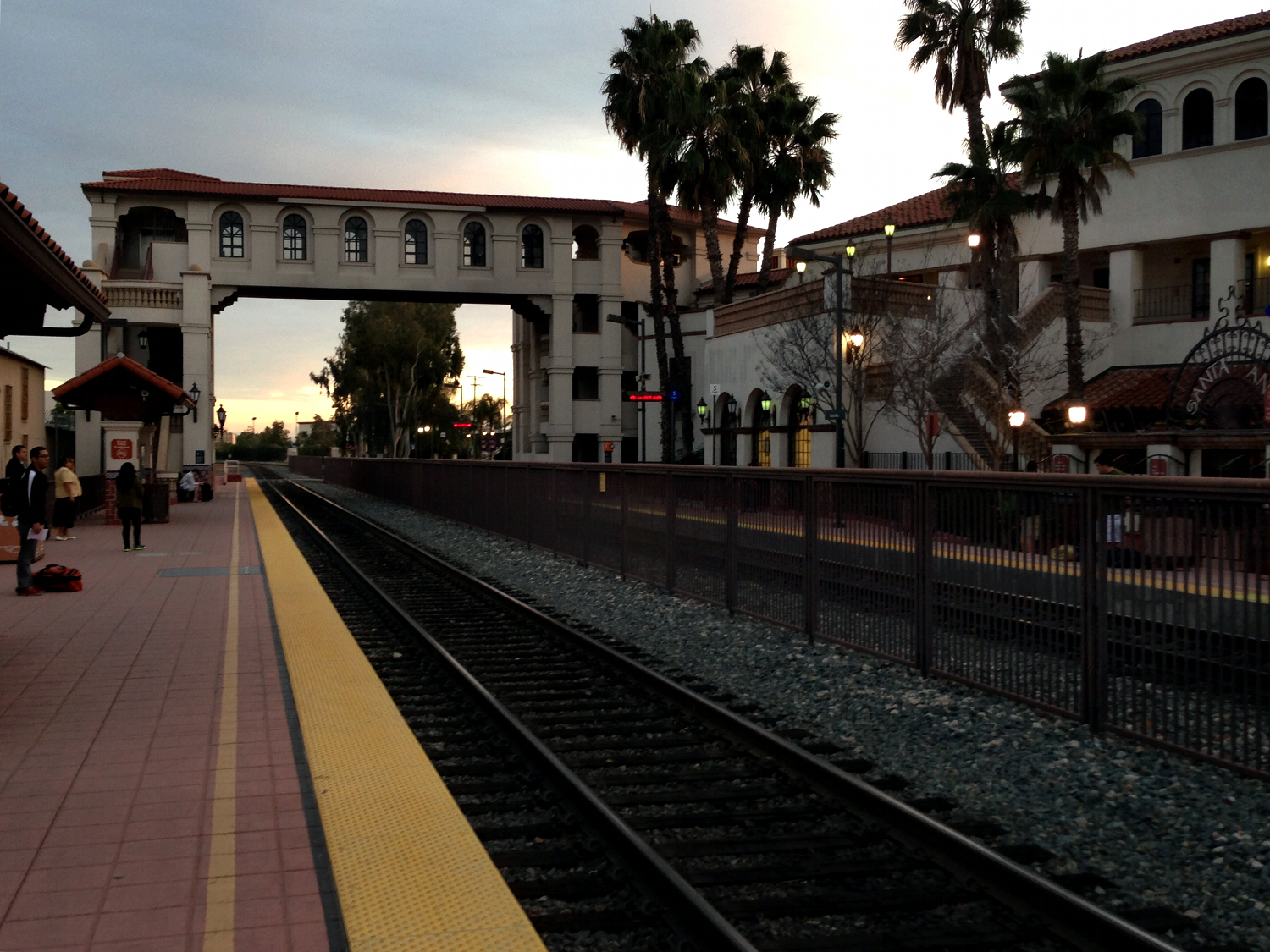
Pedestrian bridge linking northbound Track 1 to The Depot and Track 2.

The station was designed by the Blurock Partnership architectural firm in the Spanish Colonial Revival and Mediterranean Revival architectural styles to complement the region's older buildings. Features include red barrel roof tiles, arcades, colonnades, exterior walls finished to resemble stucco, and the extensive use of painted tiles for decoration.

== Service ==
=== Train hours and frequency ===
Santa Ana Regional Transportation Center is served by 26 Amtrak Pacific Surfliner trains (13 in each direction) evenly spaced throughout the day.

Santa Ana Regional Transportation Center is served by 26 Metrolink Orange County Line trains (13 in each direction) each weekday, evenly spaced throughout the day. Weekend service consists of 4 trains (2 in each direction) on both Saturday and Sunday, running in each direction in the morning and evening.

Additionally, the station is served by 18 Metrolink Inland Empire–Orange County Line trains (9 in each direction) each weekday, running primarily at peak hours in the peak direction of travel. Weekend service consists of 4 trains (2 in each direction) on both Saturday and Sunday, heading towards Orange County in the morning and towards the Inland Empire in the evening.

=== Bus services ===
- OC Bus: 59, 83, Rapid 560, 862
- Crucero USA
- Greyhound Lines

== In popular culture ==
The last scene in the movie Rain Man was filmed at the station. Its exterior and interior appeared in the second season of True Detective in 2015.
