= Orange County Line =

Commuter rail line in Southern California

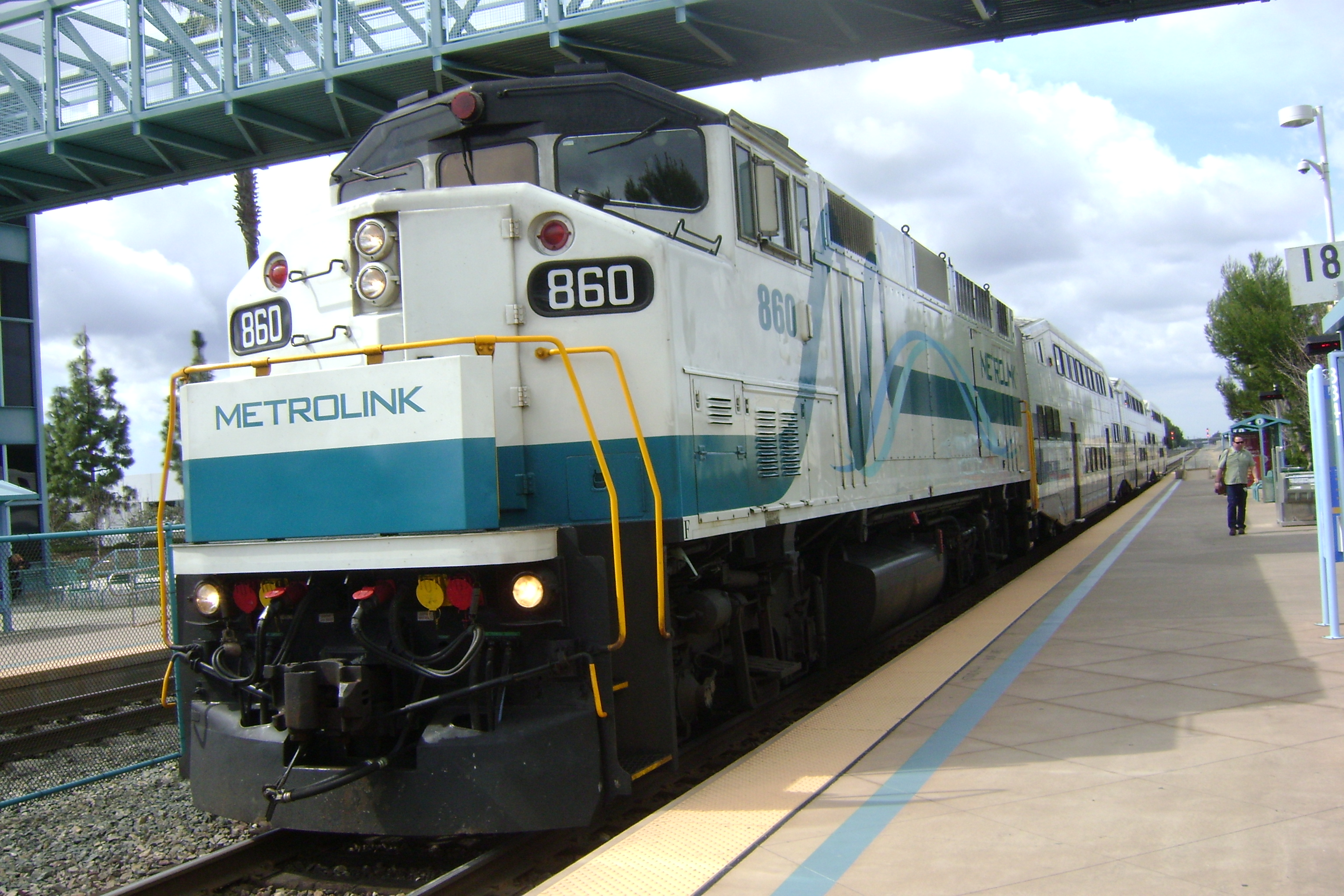
- Metrolink locomotive 860 at Irvine

Overview
- Owner: BNSF (Los Angeles–Fullerton); SCRRA (Fullerton–OC/SD County Line); NCTD (OC/SD County Line–Oceanside)
- Locale: Los Angeles, Orange, and San Diego Counties
- Termini: L.A. Union Station; Oceanside
- Stations: 15

Service
- Type: Commuter rail
- System: Metrolink
- Operator: Metrolink
- Daily ridership: 5,130 (weekdays, Q3 2025)

History
- Opened: April 30, 1990 (as Amtrak Orange County Commuter)
- Transferred to Metrolink, extended to Oceanside: March 28, 1994

Technical
- Line length: 87.2 miles (140.3 km)
- Character: Elevated and surface-level
- Track gauge: 4 ft 8 1/2 in (1,435 mm) standard gauge
- Operating speed: 90 mph (140 km/h) (top); 41 mph (66 km/h) (average)
Route map
Orange County Line highlighted in orange

The Orange County Line is a commuter rail line run by Metrolink from Los Angeles through Orange County to Oceanside in San Diego County, connecting with the Coaster commuter rail service to San Diego. The Orange County Line carries passengers to the primary Metrolink hub at L.A. Union Station in downtown Los Angeles, as well as to many attractions in Orange County including the Knott's Berry Farm area, Angel Stadium of Anaheim and the Honda Center, the Disneyland Resort, Old Town Orange, Santa Ana Zoo, Mission San Juan Capistrano and many more. In San Diego County, it serves the Oceanside Pier and Camp Pendelton.

== History ==
The Orange County Line began on April 30, 1990, as the Orange County Commuter, an Amtrak-operated service between Los Angeles and San Juan Capistrano funded by the Orange County Transportation Authority. The Orange County Commuter made a single weekday round-trip, departing San Juan Capistrano in the morning and returning in the evening. Between July and December 1993 during the Orange County Commuter's final months, both the Commerce and Orange stations opened. Amtrak conveyed the route to Metrolink on March 28, 1994, becoming the "Orange County Line" and Metrolink's fifth route. Service expanded to eight trips in 1995.

In October 2005, the Orange County Transportation Authority announced that it would increase service on the Orange County Line, running trains twenty hours daily, seven days a week every 30 minutes. The first part of the additional service was implemented in June 2006 with Saturday service, and July 2006 with Sunday service. The plan has drawn criticism as many Metrolink stations are located beyond walking distance from important destinations such as Disneyland and the adjacent Anaheim Convention Center, Knott's Berry Farm, and the Irvine Spectrum. Funds for new rolling stock and track improvements were allocated from the voter-approved Measure M half-cent sales tax, while critics had advocated using the money for bus operations or other transit service instead. To address some of these issues, OCTA operates a series of Stationlink shuttle routes that connect Metrolink stations in Orange County to nearby destinations.

As of 2019 service is provided seven days a week, with 29 trains on weekdays, and 8 on weekends. The Amtrak Pacific Surfliner supplements Orange County Line service by providing limited stop service along the corridor and more service during mid-days, nights and weekends.

== Future development ==
The route of the Orange County Line may be used for future extensions of the planned California High-Speed Rail line from Los Angeles Union Station to Anaheim. Potential stops include Norwalk or Fullerton.

The line it uses, the Surf Line, is vulnerable to the effects of coastal erosion and sea level rise in San Clemente, California. Between 2022 and 2023, service was suspended several times due to coastal erosion. Service most recently resumed on May 27, 2023.

Los Angeles Metro also plans to relocate Commerce station to the city of Pico Rivera. The new station will be a full-time stop along both the Orange County Line and the 91/Perris Valley Line. The California High-Speed Rail Authority initially proposed slightly relocating the station to a new location at Maple Avenue, north of Telegraph Road, due to severe physical, operational, and safety conflicts along the LOSSAN Corridor right of way, which it plans to utilize between its Burbank Airport station and the Anaheim Regional Transportation Intermodal Center. However, on February 23, 2023, LA Metro's board of directors unanimously approved a motion to instead conduct a feasibility study into relocating the station somewhere in Pico Rivera. On March 26, 2026, the LA Metro board of directors unanimously approved a motion accepting the results of the feasibility study and to direct staff towards advancing the station into 30% preliminary engineering, site layout design, and CEQA/NEPA environmental review. On October 22, 2026, the LA Metro board of directors unanimously approved a motion allocating up to $6 million in capital seed funding to advance the goals in the previous motion.

== Route ==
While the Orange County Line shares trackage with Amtrak's Pacific Surfliner trains, its northernmost stations (from Los Angeles to Fullerton, excluding Commerce) are shared with the 91/Perris Valley Line and nearly all of its other stations with the Inland Empire–Orange County Line (from Orange to Oceanside).

The Orange County Line runs on the BNSF Railway's Southern Transcon track between Los Angeles and Fullerton, under a shared-right-of-way agreement. Several stations, most notably the ones in downtown Fullerton and Santa Ana, are renovated Spanish Colonial Revival depots originally built by the Atchison, Topeka and Santa Fe Railway. Sections of the line between Santa Ana and Oceanside allow for 90-mile-per-hour (140 km/h) operating speeds.

== Stations ==
Under Amtrak operation the Orange County Commuter stopped at the following stations: Los Angeles, Commerce, Fullerton, Anaheim–Stadium, Orange, Santa Ana, Irvine, and San Juan Capistrano. With the Metrolink takeover in 1994 the southern terminus moved to Oceanside and five infill stations were subsequently added: San Clemente and Norwalk/Santa Fe Springs in 1995, Tustin and Laguna Niguel/Mission Viejo in 2002, and Buena Park in 2007.

Station	Connections	Address	City	County
Oceanside	Metrolink: Inland Empire–Orange County; Amtrak: Pacific Surfliner; Coaster; Sprinter	235 South Tremont Street, Oceanside, CA 92054	Oceanside	San Diego County
San Clemente Pier (weekends only)	Metrolink: Inland Empire–Orange County; Amtrak: Pacific Surfliner	615 Avenida Victoria, San Clemente, CA 92672	San Clemente	Orange County
San Clemente	Metrolink: Inland Empire–Orange County	1850 Avenida Estacion, San Clemente, CA 92672	San Clemente	Orange County
San Juan Capistrano	Metrolink: Inland Empire–Orange County; Amtrak: Pacific Surfliner	26701 Verdugo Street, San Juan Capistrano, CA 92675	San Juan Capistrano	Orange County
Laguna Niguel/Mission Viejo	Metrolink: Inland Empire–Orange County	28200 Forbes Road, Laguna Niguel, CA 92677	Laguna Niguel	Orange County
Irvine	Metrolink: Inland Empire–Orange County; Amtrak: Pacific Surfliner	15215 Barranca Parkway, Irvine, CA 92618	Irvine	Orange County
Tustin	Metrolink: Inland Empire–Orange County	2975 Edinger Avenue, Tustin, CA 92780	Tustin	Orange County
Santa Ana	Metrolink: Inland Empire–Orange County; Amtrak: Pacific Surfliner	1000 East Santa Ana Boulevard, Santa Ana, CA 92701	Santa Ana	Orange County
Orange	Metrolink: Inland Empire–Orange County	100 North Atchison Avenue, Orange, CA 92866	Orange	Orange County
Anaheim	Amtrak: Pacific Surfliner	2626 East Katella Avenue, Anaheim, CA 92806	Anaheim	Orange County
Fullerton	Metrolink: 91/Perris Valley; Amtrak: Pacific Surfliner, Southwest Chief	120 East Santa Fe Avenue, Fullerton, CA 92832	Fullerton	Orange County
Buena Park	Metrolink: 91/Perris Valley	8400 Lakeknoll Drive, Buena Park, CA 90621	Buena Park	Orange County
Norwalk/Santa Fe Springs	Metrolink: 91/Perris Valley	12700 Imperial Highway, Norwalk, CA 90650	Norwalk	Los Angeles County
Commerce (limited service)		6433 26th Street, Commerce, CA 90040	Commerce	Los Angeles County
Los Angeles Union Station	Metrolink: 91/Perris Valley Antelope Valley Riverside San Bernardino Ventura County; Amtrak: Coast Starlight, Pacific Surfliner, Southwest Chief, Sunset Limited, Texas Eagle; Metro: A Line B Line D Line J Line; FlyAway to LAX	800 North Alameda Street, Los Angeles, CA 90012	Los Angeles	Los Angeles County

The October 2017 timetable shows ten weekday trains from Los Angeles to Oceanside and back, eight from Fullerton to Laguna Niguel and back, seven from Los Angeles to Laguna Niguel and back, four from Fullerton to Oceanside, and two from Los Angeles to Irvine and back.

Passengers that have monthly passes can use Pacific Surfliner trains between their station pairs on any day except for specific blacked out days by Amtrak for holidays and special events (such as events at Del Mar) on this line

== See also ==
- Transportation in San Diego County
