= Brea Mall =

Coordinates: 33.91548°N 117.88627°W

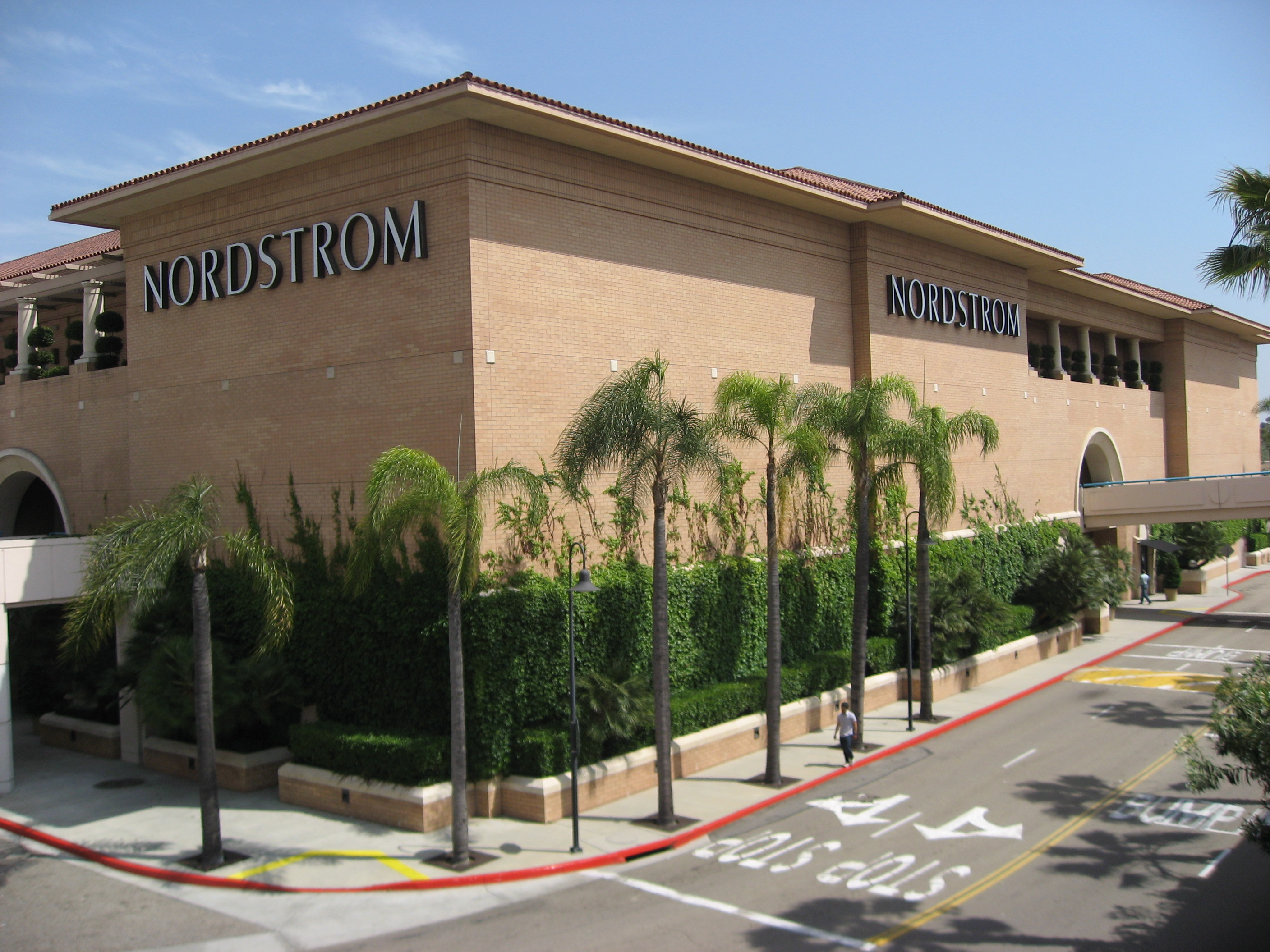
- Northwestern entrance to Brea Mall in April 2007.
- Location: 1065 Brea Mall, Brea, California, United States
- Opened: 1977
- Developer: Homart Development Company
- Manager: Simon Property Group
- Owner: Simon Property Group
- Architect: Architectonics, Inc.
- Num. of stores: 180
- Num. of anchor tenants: 5
- Floor area: 1,281,795 sq ft (119,083 m^{2}) (GLA)
- Floors: 2 (3 in main Macy's, 3rd and 4th floor offices in Nordstrom)
- Public transit: OC Bus: 57, 59, 129, 143, Foothill Transit: 286
- Website: simon.com/mall/brea-mall

The Brea Mall is an enclosed shopping mall located in the Orange County city of Brea, California. Since 1998, the mall has been owned and operated by the Simon Property Group. It is home to four major department stores, 179 specialty shops and boutiques, and a food court. It is 1,281,795 sq ft (119,083 m^{2}). The anchors are Macy's, Macy's Men's & Home, JCPenney, Nordstrom, and Dick’s Sporting Goods. The Dick’s Sporting Goods anchor building includes several shops, stores, and services that were added to the mall as part of a large development.

== History ==
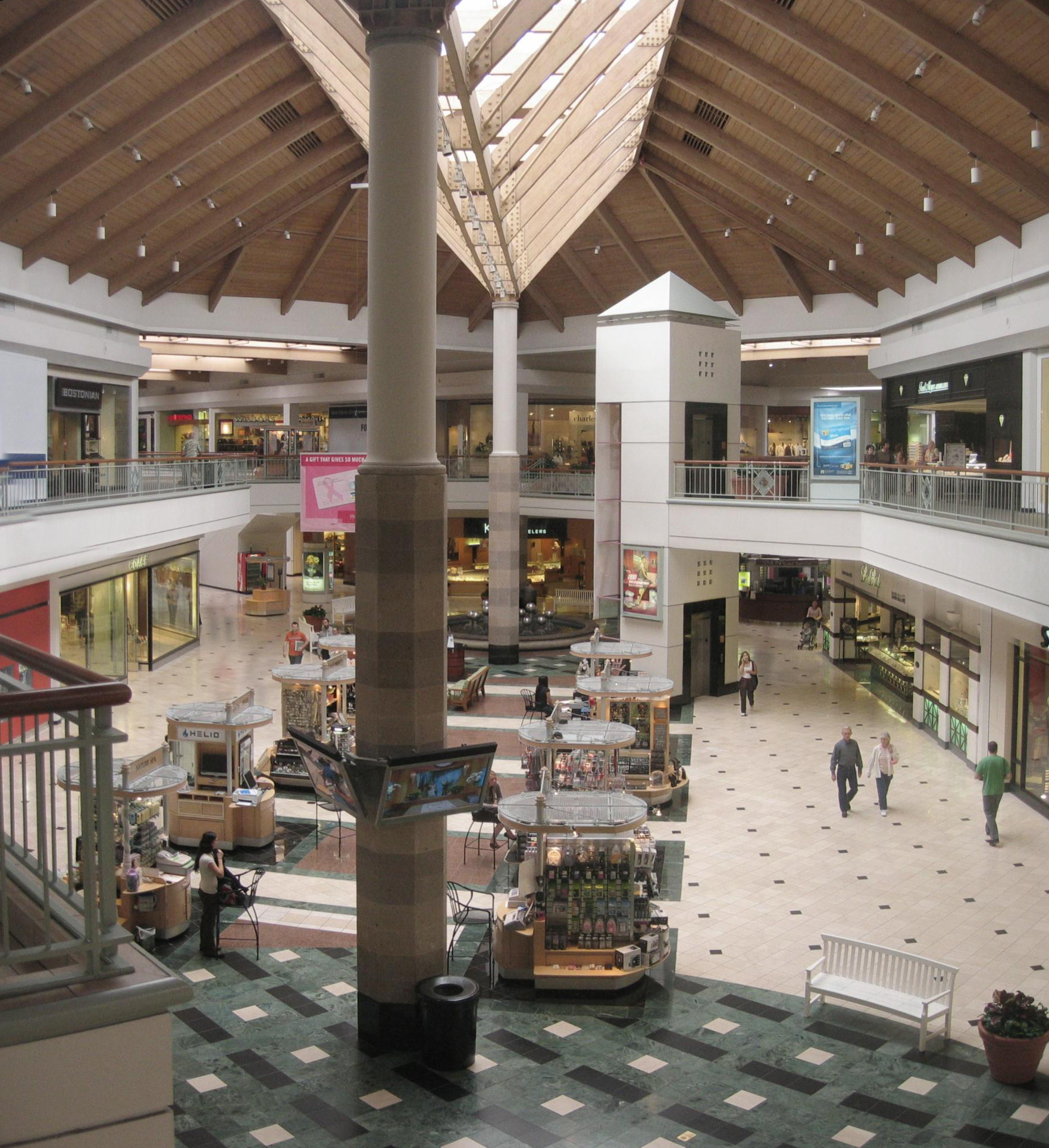
Interior of Brea Mall in May 2007

Plans for Brea Mall were announced by Homart in 1973. Architectonics, Inc. of Dallas was architect for the structure. Dan Coleman & Associates of San Francisco were responsible for master planning the project. The mall opened in 1977. Originally, the mall was anchored by Sears and May Company California. Later, The Broadway was added, and Nordstrom opened their second California store. J. W. Robinson's and a larger Nordstrom were then constructed along with a Y-shaped addition to the main mall in the early 1990s. In 1993, The May Department Stores Company merged J. W. Robinson's and May Company California to form Robinsons-May. As a result, the J. W. Robinson's store was sold to JCPenney (relocated from original location at Orangefair Marketplace in Fullerton), and the May Company California location was renamed and expanded. The Broadway was converted to Macy's after Federated Department Stores, Inc.'s purchase of The Broadway's parent company Carter Hawley Hale Stores in 1996. In 2006, due to the merger between Federated Department Stores and The May Department Stores Company, the Robinsons-May location was converted to a Macy's furniture store. In the 1970s and 1980s, the Brea Mall also had an ice skating rink that was later removed to expand the food court.

On January 4, 2018, Sears announced that its Brea store would close, as part of a plan to close 103 stores nationwide. The store closed on April 8, 2018 and was the mall's last original anchor store to close. On April 9, 2018, Simon announced plans to redevelop the Sears site with a Life Time Fitness as well as new retail, entertainment, and apartments on three levels. It is one of the five malls owned by Simon with Sears anchors being redeveloped. The Sears anchor building was demolished in 2023.

On August 22nd, 2025, Chuck's Arcade, an arcade owned by the parent company of Chuck E. Cheese, Opened In Brea Mall.

Dick’s Sporting Goods announced that they would be opening a new store on the former Sears site. The store was set to become the new anchor tenant and opened in a newly constructed building. Dick’s Sporting Goods announced a grand opening in spring, 2026. The new store is two stories and opened on April 24, 2026.
