= El Toro station (Atchison, Topeka and Santa Fe Railway) =

Former railway station in El Toro, California

El Toro

General information
- Coordinates: 33°37′39″N 117°41′40″W
- System: Former ATSF passenger rail station
- Line: ATSF Surf Line
- Platforms: 1 side platform

Construction
- Structure type: at-grade

History
- Opened: 1888
- Closed: c. 1960s

Former services
Preceding station	Atchison, Topeka and Santa Fe Railway	Following station
Santa Ana toward Los Angeles	Surf Line	San Juan Capistrano toward San Diego
Irvine Until 1947 toward Los Angeles	Surf Line	San Juan Capistrano toward San Diego
Location

El Toro station was a railway station in the former unincorporated community of El Toro, California, which was incorporated as Lake Forest in 1991. It was a stop on the Atchison, Topeka, and Santa Fe Railway (ATSF) Surf Line, which was served by San Diegan passenger trains. The station was located on the north side of El Toro Road.

== History ==
On February 25, 1887, El Toro founder Dwight Whiting granted a right-of-way to ATSF to build the Surf Line through his ranch, connecting Los Angeles and San Diego. The El Toro station opened in 1888, spurring growth in the area. It was used as a connection point for fledgling communities nearby such as Laguna Beach and Modjeska Canyon that were reached by carriage.

The station was demolished in the 1960s amidst a wave of suburban development in the area, including a railroad overpass bridge project adjacent to the site of the station.
