= Buena Park station =

Passenger train station in Buena Park, California, United States

Buena Park
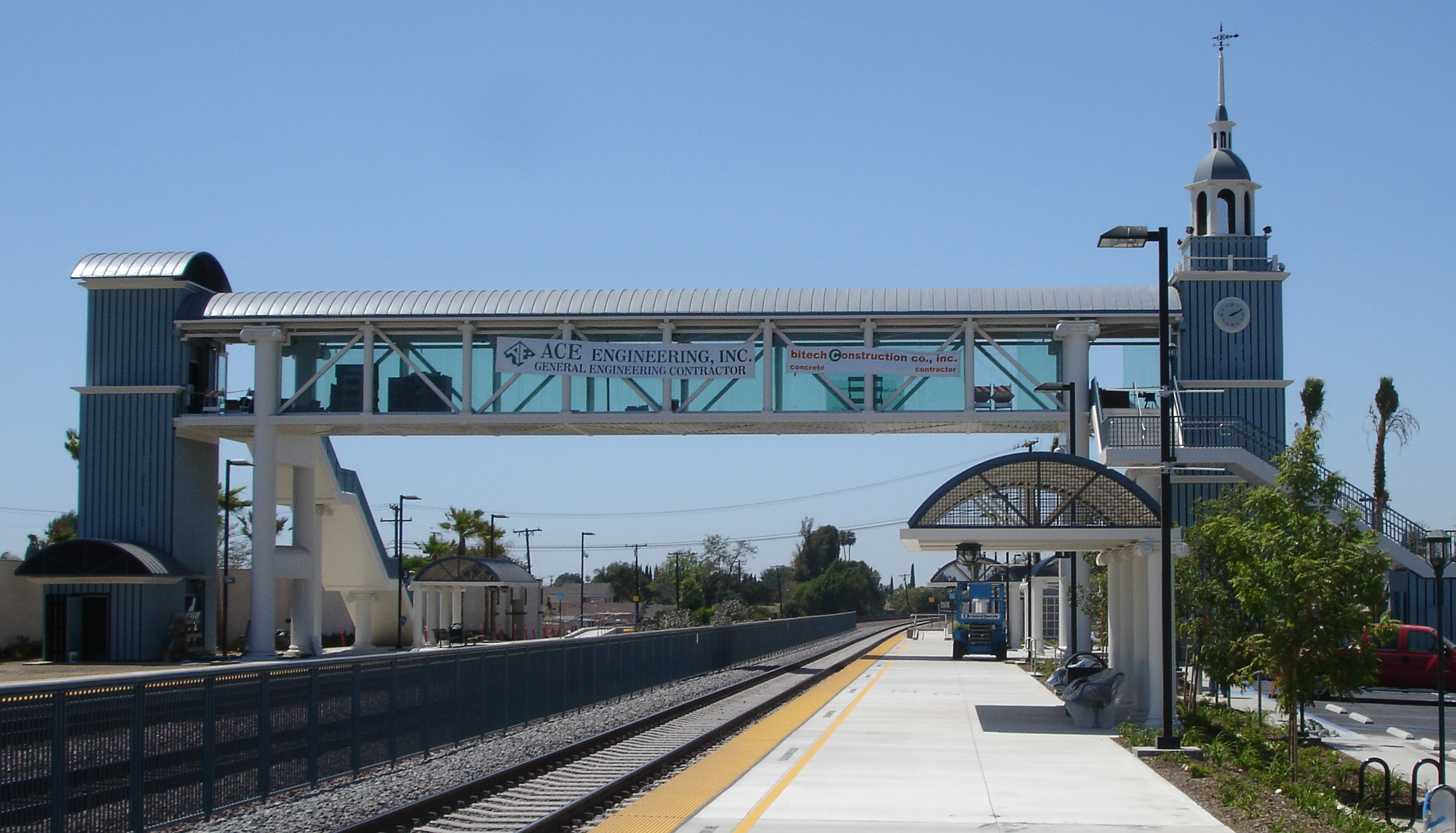
- Buena Park station, just before 2007 opening

General information
- Location: 8400 Lakeknoll Drive; Buena Park, California
- Coordinates: 33°52′34″N 117°59′18″W
- Owner: City of Buena Park
- Line: BNSF San Bernardino Subdivision
- Platforms: 2 side platforms
- Tracks: 3
- Connections: OC Bus: 25, 29A, 123

Construction
- Parking: 302 spaces, 11 accessible spaces
- Accessible: Yes

History
- Opened: September 4, 2007

Passengers
- FY 2026: 405 (avg. wkdy boardings)

Services
Preceding station	Metrolink	Following station
Norwalk/Santa Fe Springs toward L.A. Union Station	91/Perris Valley Line	Fullerton toward Perris–South
Norwalk/Santa Fe Springs toward L.A. Union Station	Orange County Line	Fullerton toward Oceanside
Former services (at AT&SF station)
Preceding station	Atchison, Topeka and Santa Fe Railway	Following station
La Mirada toward Los Angeles	Surf Line	Fullerton toward San Diego
Location

Buena Park station is a train station in Buena Park, California, United States, served by Metrolink commuter rail. It is at the center of a transit-oriented development including townhomes and a housing complex owned by the California State University, Fullerton, near the corner of Dale Street and Malvern Avenue. The station is served by Metrolink's Orange County Line and 91/Perris Valley Line.

The station has a clock tower nearly 70 feet high which echoes a clock tower at nearby Knott's Berry Farm, itself a copy of Independence Hall in Philadelphia. The station includes a 300-car parking lot and a covered pedestrian overpass to allow passengers to cross the tracks.

Construction started in January 2006, and after many delays, the station opened on September 4, 2007. Construction cost $14 million.

The proposed alignment for the California High-Speed Rail project would require the loss of the station or the demolition of about 25 condominiums. The City of Buena Park joined other area municipalities to demand greater consultation from the High-Speed Rail Commission. In response, the California High-Speed Rail Authority agreed to study the possibility of a "shared-track alignment" between Los Angeles and Anaheim that would not require the demolition of the present station or condominiums. Another proposal will move the station two blocks west to Beach Boulevard.

Amtrak(s) Pacific Surfliner and Southwest Chief passes through the station but does not stop in Buena Park.

== Services ==
=== Rail ===
Buena Park is served by Metrolink's Orange County and 91/Perris Valley Lines. Three tracks pass through the station, but only tracks 1 and 3 have platforms for passenger service.

=== Bus ===
The station's driveway has two "zones" that are used for OCTA services.

- Zone 1
  - Route 29A – Southbound to Huntington Beach via Beach Boulevard (SR 39)
- Zone 2
  - Route 123 – Eastbound to Anaheim Canyon Station via Malvern, Chapman and Tustin Avenues or southbound to Golden West Transportation Center in Huntington Beach via Valley View Street, then Bolsa Chica Road
