= Tustin station =

Passenger train station in Tustin, California, United States

Tustin
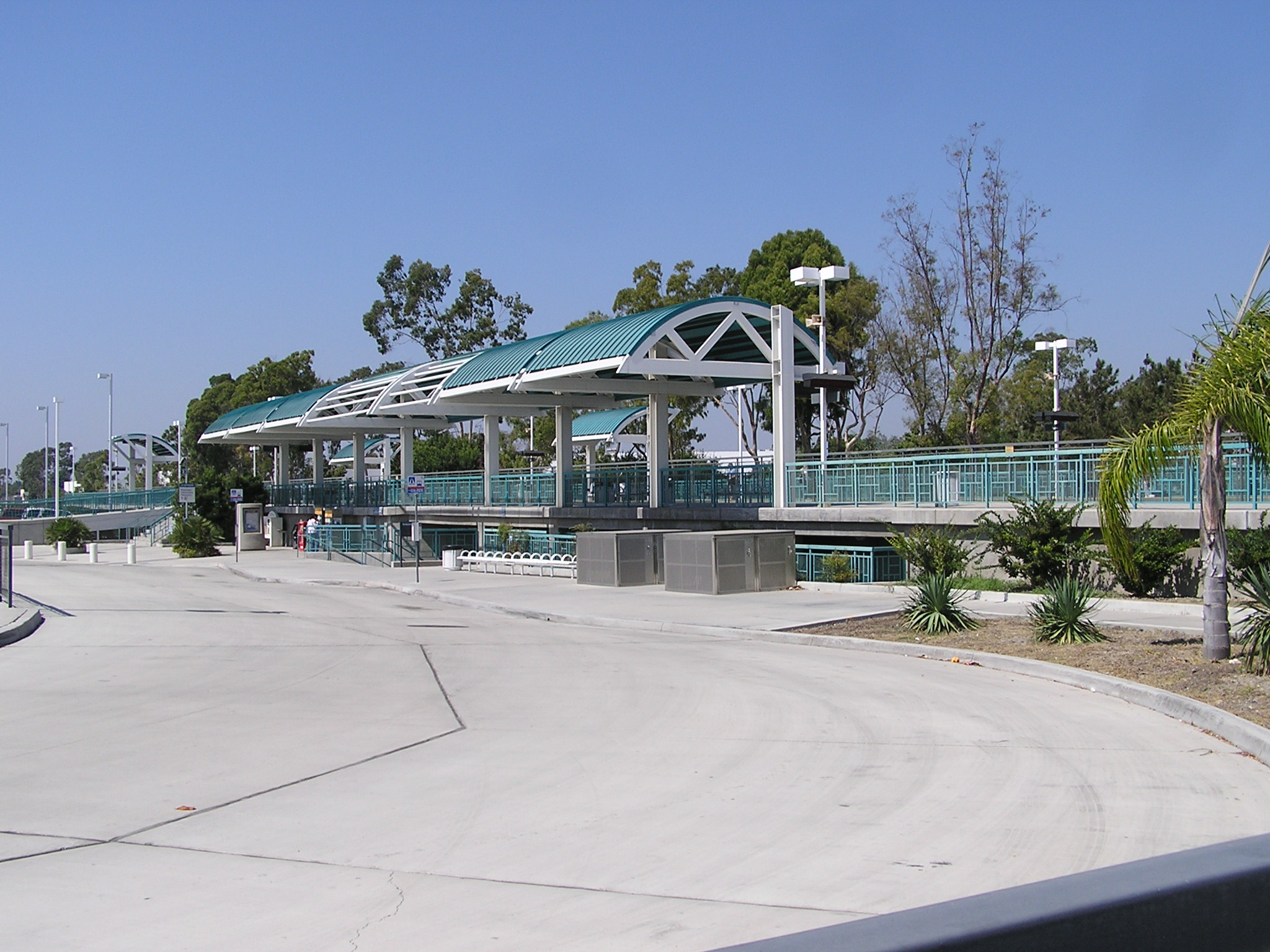
- Tustin station

General information
- Location: 2975 Edinger Avenue; Tustin, California
- Coordinates: 33°42′29″N 117°48′22″W
- Owner: City of Tustin
- Line: SCRRA Orange Subdivision
- Platforms: 2 side platforms
- Tracks: 2
- Bus stands: 8
- Connections: OC Bus: 70, 72, 90, 472, 473; iShuttle: 400A, 401B (formerly)

Construction
- Parking: 432 spaces, 8 accessible spaces
- Cycle facilities: Racks, lockers
- Accessible: Yes

History
- Opened: January 18, 2002

Passengers
- FY 2026: 695 (avg. wkdy boardings)

Services
Preceding station	Metrolink	Following station
Santa Ana toward San Bernardino–Downtown	Inland Empire–Orange County Line	Irvine toward Oceanside
Santa Ana toward L.A. Union Station	Orange County Line	Irvine toward Oceanside
Location

Tustin station is a Metrolink train station in Tustin, California, United States. The station is located in a shopping plaza at the intersection of Jamboree Road and Edinger Avenue. Between October 2010 and September 2011, the parking lot was closed to all cars to facilitate the construction of a five-level, 733-space parking structure. When combined with the 91 surface parking spaces, the station has 824 parking spaces, nearly tripling available parking on site.

OCTA buses and City of Irvine's iShuttle also services the station during peak commute hours. Amtrak's Pacific Surfliner passes through the station at 90 mph (140 km/h) and does not stop in Tustin. The nearest stations served by Amtrak are Irvine and Santa Ana.

== Service ==
=== Trains ===
Tustin station is served by 26 Metrolink Orange County Line trains (13 in each direction) each weekday, evenly spaced throughout the day. Weekend service consists of 4 trains (2 in each direction) on both Saturday and Sunday, running in each direction in the morning and evening.

Additionally, the station is served by 18 Metrolink Inland Empire–Orange County Line trains (9 in each direction) each weekday, running primarily at peak hours in the peak direction of travel. Weekend service consists of 4 trains (2 in each direction) on both Saturday and Sunday, heading towards Orange County in the morning and towards the Inland Empire in the evening.

=== Buses ===
Dock	Operator	Route	Destination
1	iShuttle	400A	South to John Wayne Airport
2	iShuttle	401B	South to Irvine Business Complex
3	OC Bus	72	West to Sunset Beach
4	OC Bus	472	South to Newport Beach
5	OC Bus	473	South to UCI
6	OC Bus	70	West to Sunset Beach
7	OC Bus	70	West to Sunset Beach
8	OC Bus	90	South to Dana Point Harbor
