= Irvine Transportation Center =

Transit center in Irvine, California, United States

Irvine, CA
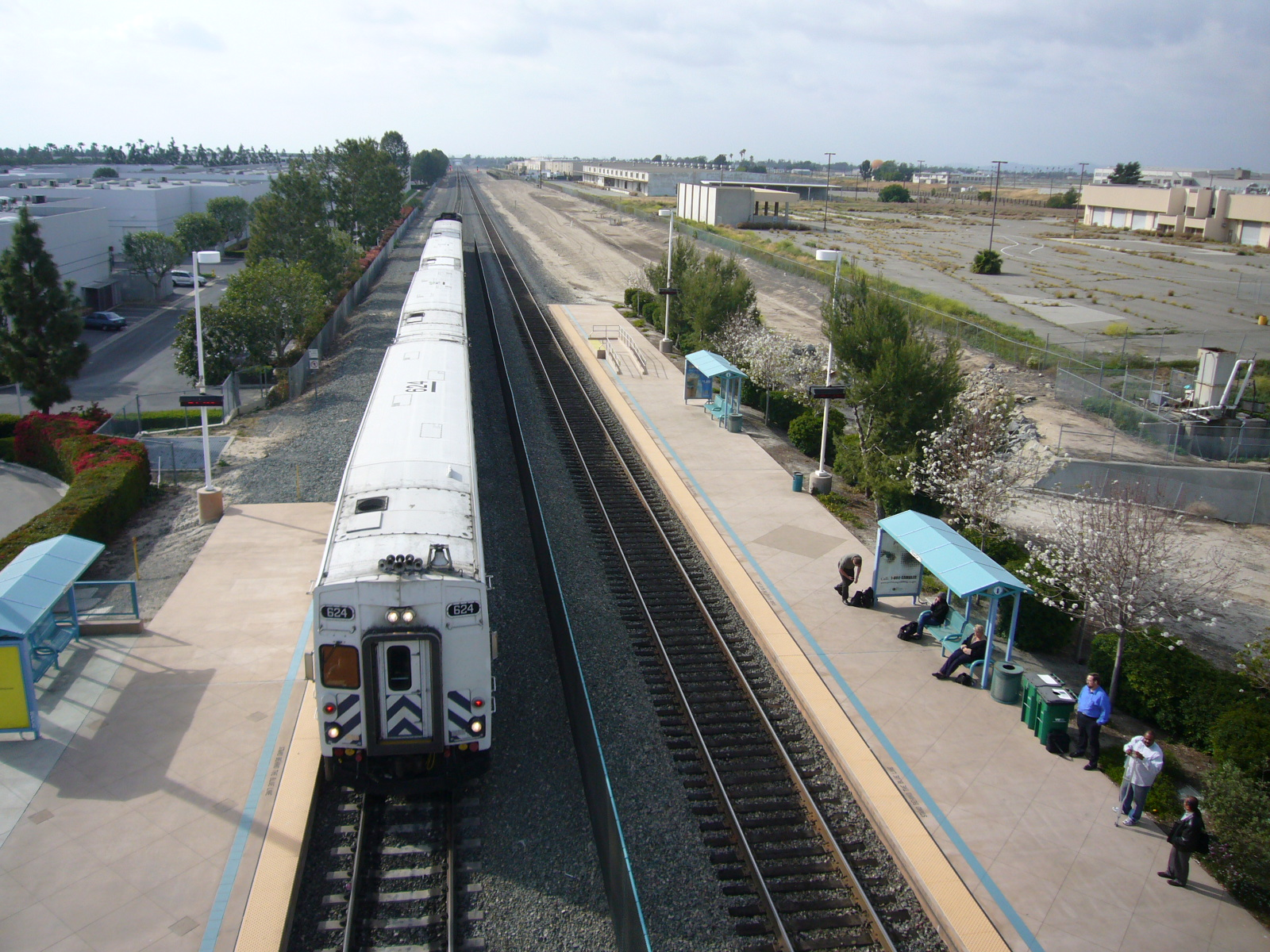
- A Metrolink train pulls in to Irvine, April 2008

General information
- Other names: Irvine Transit Center; Irvine
- Location: 15215 Barranca Parkway; Irvine, California; United States
- Coordinates: 33°39′24″N 117°44′01″W
- Owner: City of Irvine
- Line: SCRRA Orange Subdivision
- Platforms: 2 side platforms
- Tracks: 2
- Bus stands: 8
- Bus operators: OC Bus; Irvine CONNECT; Chapman University Shuttle

Construction
- Parking: 1,650 spaces
- Cycle facilities: Racks and lockers
- Accessible: Yes

Other information
- Status: Unstaffed, station building with waiting room
- Station code: Amtrak: IRV

History
- Opened: June 1, 1990

Passengers
- FY 2025: 244,373 annually (Amtrak)
- FY 2026: 704 weekday boardings (Metrolink)

Services
Preceding station	Amtrak	Following station
Santa Ana toward San Luis Obispo	Pacific Surfliner	San Juan Capistrano toward San Diego
Preceding station	Metrolink	Following station
Tustin toward San Bernardino–Downtown	Inland Empire–Orange County Line	Laguna Niguel/Mission Viejo toward Oceanside
Tustin toward L.A. Union Station	Orange County Line	Laguna Niguel/Mission Viejo toward Oceanside
Former services
Preceding station	Amtrak	Following station
Santa Ana toward Los Angeles	Orange County Commuter	San Juan Capistrano Terminus
Santa Ana toward Los Angeles	San Diegan	San Juan Capistrano toward San Diego
At previous Irvine station (pre-1947)
Preceding station	Atchison, Topeka and Santa Fe Railway	Following station
Santa Ana toward Los Angeles	Surf Line	El Toro toward San Diego
Location

The Irvine Transportation Center (shortened to Irvine Transit Center and also known as Irvine station) is a transit center in the Irvine Spectrum district of southeastern Irvine, California, United States. Located on the southwest end of the decommissioned Marine Corps Air Station El Toro, it is served by Amtrak California's Pacific Surfliner route, two Metrolink commuter rail lines, and multiple OC Bus routes.

The $13 million Irvine Transportation Center opened on June 1, 1990, when Irvine was officially added to the Amtrak timetable as a stop on the route of the San Diegan (later renamed the Pacific Surfliner). On August 25, 2008, a new four-story parking structure was opened to expand available parking at the station by 1,500 spots.

== History ==
Rail history in the vicinity of modern-day Irvine predates the city's incorporation. In 1889, James Irvine II permitted the Atchison, Topeka and Santa Fe Railway to build tracks through Irvine Ranch towards San Diego and establish a station at Myford to serve the local farms. Myford was later renamed Irvine in 1914, and it remained an unincorporated community.

When Santa Fe introduced the San Diegan passenger service in 1938, Irvine was included as a stop on the route. The passenger depot closed in 1947, leaving the town without rail service.

In 1988, the city of Irvine announced plans for a new Amtrak station in the Irvine Spectrum neighborhood, accompanying rapid commercial development in the area at the time. The facility cost US$13 million to build, $4 million of which Caltrans provided. Following an official dedication on May 16, 1990, the Irvine Transportation Center opened on June 1, bringing passenger rail to the area for the first time in 43 years and for the first time since the city's incorporation in 1971.

Amtrak began serving the station on June 6, 1990, five days after its opening. Its inaugural services were the San Diegan, a continuation of the original Santa Fe line that originally served Irvine, and the Orange County Commuter, a once-daily roundtrip from San Juan Capistrano station to Los Angeles Union Station.

In 1994, Amtrak turned over control of the Orange County Commuter service to Los Angeles-based commuter rail Metrolink, and it became the Orange County Line. The Irvine Transportation Center effectively became an inaugural station of the new line, and service was increased from the original once-a-day Commuter schedule.

== Rail ridership ==
In FY2009, Irvine served about 3,000 total passengers daily for Metrolink and Amtrak.

Irvine served a total of 244,373 Amtrak passengers in fiscal year 2025.

== Service ==
=== Rail ===
Irvine Transportation Center is served by 26 Amtrak Pacific Surfliner trains (13 in each direction) evenly spaced throughout the day.

Irvine Transportation Center is served by 26 Metrolink Orange County Line trains (13 in each direction) each weekday, evenly spaced throughout the day. Weekend service consists of 4 trains (2 in each direction) on both Saturday and Sunday, running in each direction in the morning and evening.

Additionally, the station is served by 18 Metrolink Inland Empire–Orange County Line trains (9 in each direction) each weekday, running primarily at peak hours in the peak direction of travel. Weekend service consists of 4 trains (2 in each direction) on both Saturday and Sunday, heading towards Orange County in the morning and towards the Inland Empire in the evening.

=== Buses ===
Dock	Operator	Route	Destination
1	OC Bus	480	AM to Lake Forest; PM to Irvine Station
2	not in service		
3	not in service		
4	Irvine CONNECT	Yale-Barranca	To Yale/Irvine
4	Chapman University	Rinker Train Shuttle	Chapman University Rinker Health Science Campus
5	OC Bus	86	East to Mission Viejo; West to Costa Mesa
6	not in service		
7	not in service		
8	not in service		

=== Former bus services ===
FlyAway (bus) coach service to Los Angeles International Airport was formerly provided from the station, but was discontinued due to low ridership.

== See also ==
- Orange County Great Park
