= Orange station (California) =

Transit center in Orange, California, United States

Orange
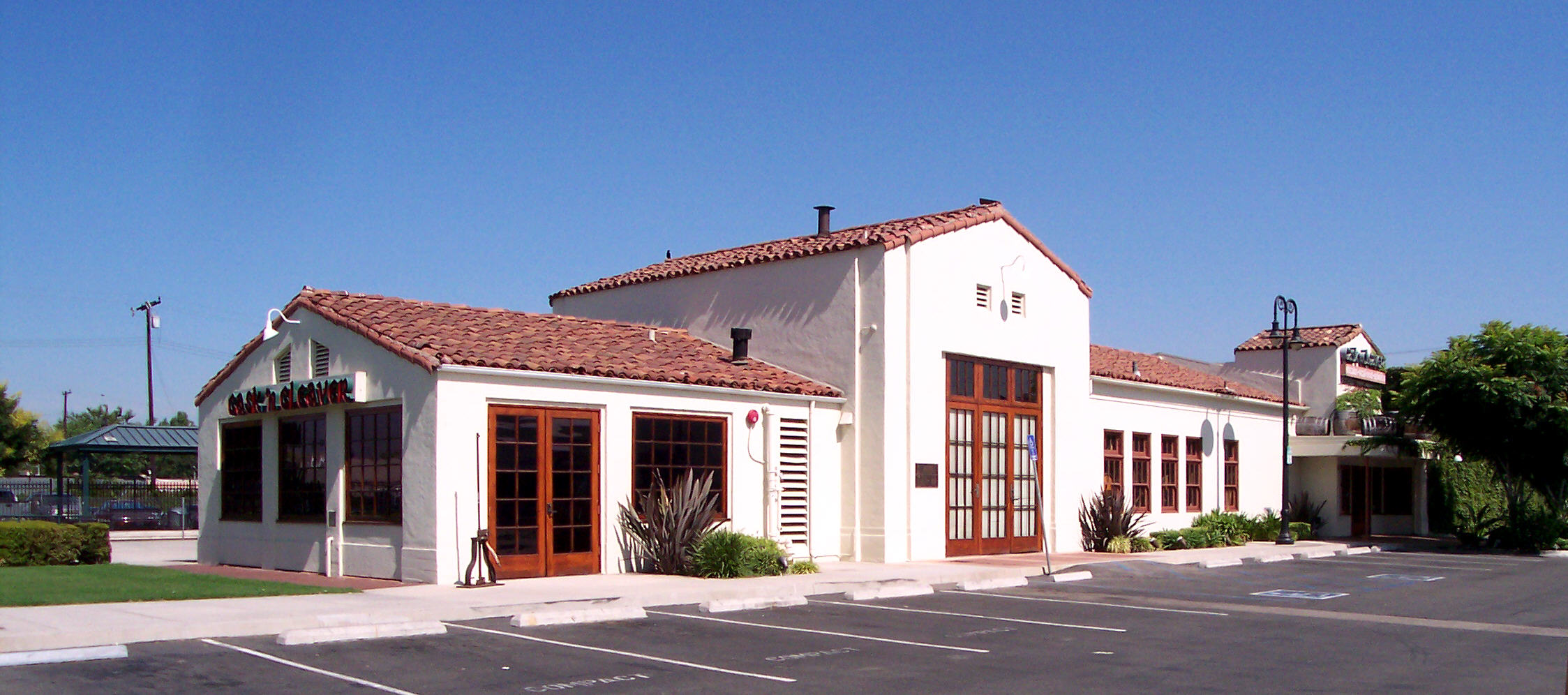
- The former Atchison, Topeka, and Santa Fe Railway depot at the station site, now a restaurant

General information
- Other names: Orange Transportation Center; Orange Transit Center
- Location: 100 North Atchison Street; Orange, California
- Coordinates: 33°47′20″N 117°51′26″W
- Owner: City of Orange
- Line: SCRRA Orange Subdivision
- Platforms: 2 side platforms
- Tracks: 2
- Connections: OC Bus: 54, 56, 59, 453; Chapman University Shuttle

Construction
- Parking: 825 spaces
- Cycle facilities: Racks and lockers
- Accessible: Yes

History
- Opened: 1888
- Rebuilt: 1938, 1993

Passengers
- FY 2026: 432 (avg. wkdy boardings)

Services
Preceding station	Metrolink	Following station
Anaheim Canyon toward San Bernardino–Downtown	Inland Empire–Orange County Line	Santa Ana toward Oceanside
Anaheim toward L.A. Union Station	Orange County Line	Santa Ana toward Oceanside
Former services
Preceding station	Amtrak	Following station
Anaheim toward Los Angeles	Orange County Commuter	Santa Ana toward San Juan Capistrano
Anaheim toward San Luis Obispo	Pacific Surfliner	Santa Ana toward San Diego
Preceding station	Atchison, Topeka and Santa Fe Railway	Following station
Anaheim toward Los Angeles	Surf Line	Santa Ana toward San Diego
Location

Orange station (formally the Orange Transportation Center, also known as the Orange Transit Center) is an intermodal transit center in Orange, California, United States. It is served by Metrolink trains and Orange County Transportation Authority buses. The station is located adjacent to the Chapman University campus and four blocks from Plaza Park, in the center of the city's Old Towne neighborhood. The station occupies the site of two former Atchison, Topeka and Santa Fe Railway depots. The present depot was dedicated on May 1, 1938, and closed in 1971 when Santa Fe discontinued its passenger service. It now houses a restaurant and was designated a historic landmark by the city on November 15, 1990.

== History ==
The first rail service in the City of Orange was the Santa Ana, Orange & Tustin Street Railway, a 4.04-mile (6.5 km) horsecar line that began operating between Santa Ana and Orange in 1886. One year later, the Santa Ana & Orange Motor Road Company purchased the line and operated it using a steam "dummy" car and a single gasoline motorcar. In 1906, Henry Huntington acquired the company under the auspices of the Los Angeles Inter-Urban Railway, which later became part of the Pacific Electric Railway, and electrified the line. Passenger service over the new line, operated by Pacific Electric, began on June 8, 1914. The route also provided freight service to local citrus growers in direct competition with the Santa Fe. In 1961, Pacific Electric sold its operations to the Southern Pacific Railroad, which ultimately abandoned the line in 1964.

The Santa Fe, through its affiliate the Southern California Railway, laid its first tracks through Orange in 1886 and established its first Orange depot in 1888. The route later became part of the railroad's Surf Line, and by 1925, 16 daily passenger trains, including the Santa Fe's San Diegan, stopped in Orange. During peak growing seasons, as many as 48 carloads of citrus fruit, olives, and walnuts were also shipped daily from the Orange depot.

Passenger service returned to the station on December 6, 1993, when Amtrak's Orange County Commuter began stopping there. The Orange County Commuter became Metrolink's Orange County Line on March 28, 1994. The Inland Empire–Orange County Line began serving the station when the line opened on October 2, 1995.

On October 29, 2007, Amtrak added Orange as a stop on the Pacific Surfliner route. Initially, two morning and two evening trains stopped at the station each day. By 2010, however, the station was serving an average of only seven passengers per day. Because of low ridership, Amtrak discontinued the stop in early 2013.

== Service ==
Rail connections to Los Angeles, the Inland Empire, and Northern San Diego County are provided by the Metrolink regional commuter rail network. The Metrolink platform is situated adjacent to the former Santa Fe depot in the downtown Historic District, which is also home to an Orange County Transportation Authority (OCTA) bus station. The former Santa Fe mainline links the cities of Los Angeles, Riverside, and San Diego via a junction north of the station.

=== Hours and frequency ===
Orange station is served by 26 Metrolink Orange County Line trains (13 in each direction) each weekday, evenly spaced throughout the day. Weekend service consists of 4 trains (2 in each direction) on both Saturday and Sunday, running in each direction in the morning and evening.

Additionally, the station is served by 18 Metrolink Inland Empire–Orange County Line trains (9 in each direction) each weekday, running primarily at peak hours in the peak direction of travel. Weekend service consists of 4 trains (2 in each direction) on both Saturday and Sunday, heading towards Orange County in the morning and towards the Inland Empire in the evening.

=== Bus docks ===
The station has three bus docks:

- Dock 1 – OC Bus: 54, 59
- Dock 2 – OC Bus: 56, 453 (weekday peak hours, peak direction only)
- Dock 3 – Chapman University shuttle (weekdays)
