= Commerce station (California) =

Rail station in Commerce, California, United States

Commerce
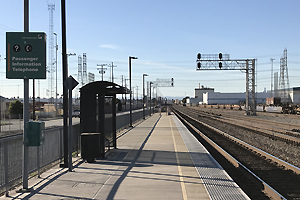
- Commerce station in February 2022

General information
- Location: 6433 26th Street; Commerce, California
- Coordinates: 33°59′26″N 118°8′36″W
- Owner: City of Commerce
- Line: BNSF San Bernardino Subdivision
- Platforms: 1 side platform
- Tracks: 4
- Connections: City of Commerce Transit: 100, 500; Montebello Bus Lines: 30; Los Angeles Metro Bus: 62

Construction
- Parking: 135 spaces, 5 accessible spaces
- Accessible: Yes

History
- Opened: July 28, 1993

Passengers
- FY 2026: 33 (avg. wkdy boardings)

Services
Preceding station	Metrolink	Following station
L.A. Union Station Terminus	Orange County Line	Norwalk/Santa Fe Springs toward Oceanside
91/Perris Valley Line does not stop here
Former services
Preceding station	Amtrak	Following station
Los Angeles Terminus	Orange County Commuter	Fullerton toward San Juan Capistrano
Los Angeles Terminus	San Diegan	Fullerton toward San Diego
Location

Commerce station is a Metrolink commuter rail station in the city of Commerce, California. It is served by Metrolink's Orange County Line running from Los Angeles Union Station to Oceanside. The 91/Perris Valley Line from Los Angeles Union Station to Riverside shares the track with the Orange County Line; however, no 91/Perris Valley Line trains actually serve the Commerce station. On weekdays, this station is served by 7 Orange County Line trains (4 inbound trains in the morning and 3 outbound trains in the afternoon) each weekday. There is no midday, reverse-peak, or weekend service to this station.

Los Angeles Metro plans to relocate the station to the city of Pico Rivera. The new station will be a full-time stop along both the Orange County Line and the 91/Perris Valley Line. The California High-Speed Rail Authority initially proposed slightly relocating the station to a new location at Maple Avenue, north of Telegraph Road, due to severe physical, operational, and safety conflicts along the LOSSAN Corridor right of way, which it plans to utilize between its Burbank Airport station and the Anaheim Regional Transportation Intermodal Center. However, on February 23, 2023, LA Metro's board of directors unanimously approved a motion to instead conduct a feasibility study into relocating the station somewhere in Pico Rivera. On March 26, 2026, the LA Metro board of directors unanimously approved a motion accepting the results of the feasibility study and to direct staff towards advancing the station into 30% preliminary engineering, site layout design, and CEQA/NEPA environmental review. On October 22, 2026, the LA Metro board of directors unanimously approved a motion allocating up to $6 million in capital seed funding to advance the goals in the previous motion.

== History ==
Commerce opened on July 28, 1993, as an infill station for Amtrak's Orange County Commuter and some San Diegan trains. The Orange County Commuter became Metrolink's Orange County Line when that line opened on March 28, 1994. Amtrak service ended in October 1998.
