= Fullerton Transportation Center =

Transit center in Fullerton, California, U.S.

Fullerton, CA
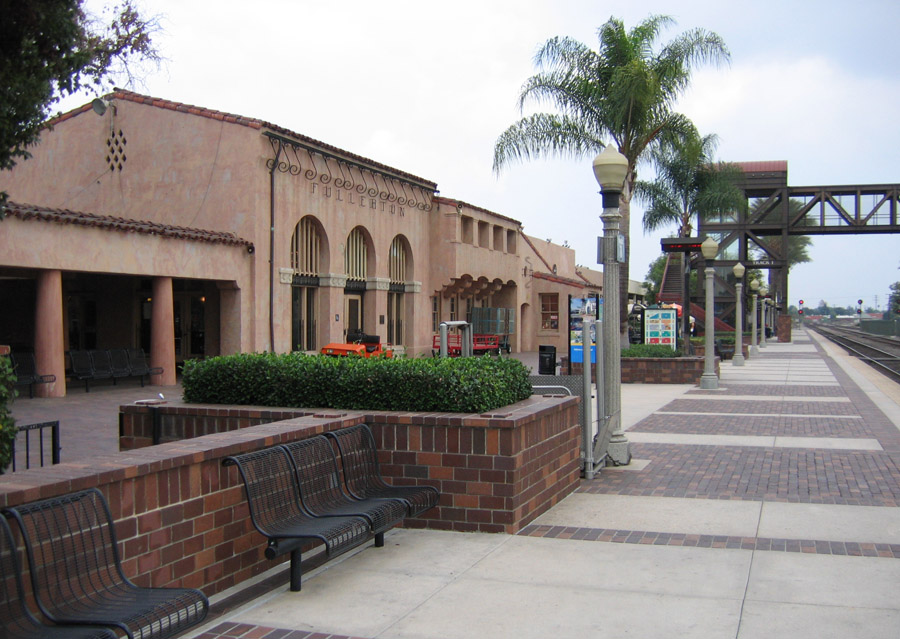
- Fullerton station trackside

General information
- Other names: Fullerton Transportation Center
- Location: 120 East Santa Fe Avenue; Fullerton, California; United States
- Coordinates: 33°52′07″N 117°55′20″W
- Owner: BNSF Railway and City of Fullerton
- Lines: BNSF San Bernardino Subdivision (main lines); SCRRA Orange Subdivision (bay platform)
- Platforms: 2 side platforms, 1 bay platform
- Tracks: 4
- Bus stands: 6
- Connections: Amtrak Thruway: 1, 39; OC Bus: 26, 43, 47, 123, 143, 543

Construction
- Parking: 1,321 spaces, 40 accessible spaces
- Cycle facilities: Racks and lockers
- Accessible: Yes

Other information
- Status: Staffed, station building with waiting room
- Station code: Amtrak: FUL

History
- Opened: 1888 (AT&SF)
- Rebuilt: 1930, 1993
- Original company: Atchison, Topeka and Santa Fe Railway

Passengers
- FY 2025: 230,141 annually (Amtrak)
- FY 2026: 911 weekday boardings (Metrolink)

Services
Preceding station	Amtrak	Following station
Los Angeles toward San Luis Obispo	Pacific Surfliner	Anaheim toward San Diego
Los Angeles Terminus	Southwest Chief	Riverside toward Chicago
Preceding station	Metrolink	Following station
Buena Park toward L.A. Union Station	91/Perris Valley Line	Corona–West toward Perris–South
Buena Park toward L.A. Union Station	Orange County Line	Anaheim toward Oceanside
Former services
Preceding station	Amtrak	Following station
Los Angeles Terminus	Desert Wind 1986-1997	San Bernardino toward Chicago
Preceding station	Atchison, Topeka and Santa Fe Railway	Following station
Rivera toward Los Angeles	Main Line Via Fullerton, Riverside	Placentia toward Chicago
Los Angeles Terminus	Surf Line	Anaheim toward San Diego
Preceding station	Union Pacific Railroad	Following station
La Habra toward East Los Angeles	East Los Angeles – Anaheim	Anaheim Terminus
Preceding station	Pacific Electric	Following station
Harvard Avenue toward Pacific Electric Building	Fullerton	Terminus
- Santa Fe Railway Passenger and Freight Depot (Fullerton, California)
- U.S. National Register of Historic Places
- Area: 1 acre (0.4 ha)
- Built: 1930
- Architect: E. J. Herbert
- Architectural style: Mission/Spanish Colonial Revival
- NRHP reference No.: 91002031
- Added to NRHP: February 5, 1992
- Fullerton Union Pacific Depot
- U.S. National Register of Historic Places
- Area: 0.8 acres (0.3 ha)
- Built: 1923
- Built by: Union Pacific Railroad
- Architect: John and Donald Parkinson
- Architectural style: Mission Revival style/Spanish Colonial Revival
- NRHP reference No.: 83003551
- Added to NRHP: October 12, 1983
Track layout
Location

The Fullerton Transportation Center is a transit center located in Fullerton, California, United States. It is served by Amtrak's Pacific Surfliner and Southwest Chief trains, as well as Metrolink's 91/Perris Valley Line and Orange County Line trains. It is also a major bus depot for the OC Bus system, and is one of the major transportation hubs of Orange County.

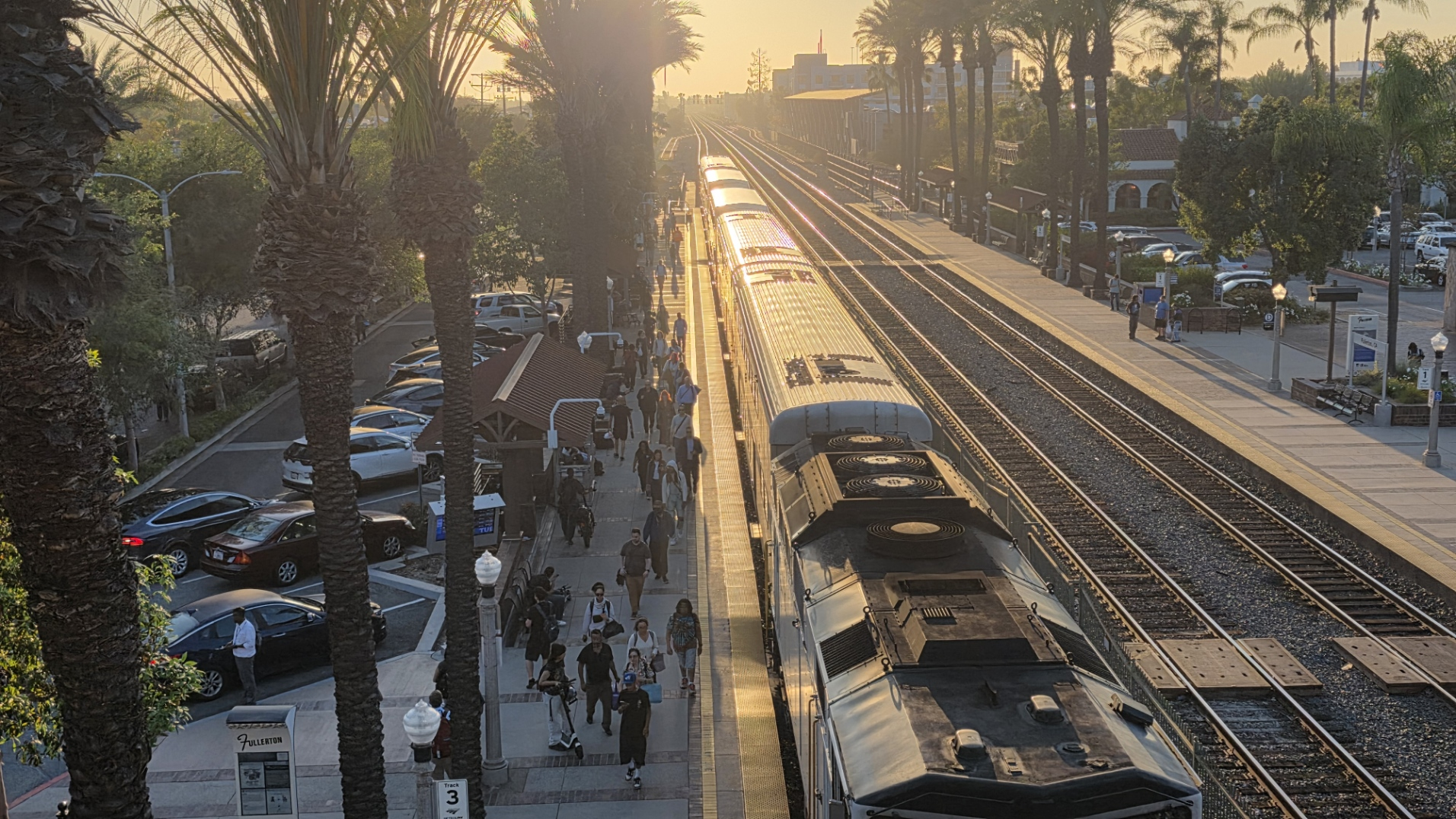
Passengers getting on and off of Metrolink Train in Fullerton Station

== History ==
The Atchison, Topeka and Santa Fe Railway opened its first Fullerton station in 1888.

The station has three historic depots on site: one built in 1923 by the Union Pacific Railroad, another built in 1930 by the Atchison, Topeka and Santa Fe Railway, and the third used by the Pacific Electric starting in 1918. The two mainline depots are on the National Register of Historic Places.

The 1930 Santa Fe depot serves as an Amtrak ticket office and passenger waiting area and has a cafe. It features Spanish Colonial Revival style architecture, as evidenced by the stuccoed walls, red tile roof, and decorative wrought ironwork.

The Union Pacific Railroad was the third railway to lay tracks through Fullerton and to build a depot. The 1923 Mission Revival style building was designed by John and Donald Parkinson. Fullerton's redevelopment agency moved the station next to the Santa Fe depot in 1980 to preserve it. Now it is occupied by an Old Spaghetti Factory restaurant.

Pacific Electric constructed an interurban railway to Fullerton in 1917, terminating just north of the Santa Fe station and provided a transfer point to their system. The Mission Revival style depot was built the following year. Their passenger service lasted until January 1938. Greyhound Bus service called at the depot between 1936 and 1976.

In September 1983, the Orange County Transit District (now the Orange County Transportation Authority) opened the Fullerton Transportation Center bus depot which is located across the street from the station, and is served by OCTA routes 26, 43, 47, 123, 143, and 543.

This station became one of the original nine stations on the Metrolink Orange County Line when it opened on March 28, 1994 and also one of the original 7 stations when the 91 Line (now the 91/Perris Valley Line) opened on May 6, 2002.

In the late 1990s, the Fullerton Railway Plaza Association (FRPA) began fundraising and lobbying for the creation of an interactive railroad attraction or museum at the site, while continuing preservation efforts. Railroad Days was not held in 2009, and FRPA looked elsewhere, choosing to hold its 2010 event in neighboring Brea. The organization subsequently changed its name to the Southern California Railway Plaza Association (SCRPA). However, Railroad Days for 2020 was cancelled in response to the COVID-19 pandemic.

The California High-Speed Rail Authority is considering the station as a possible stop on the first phase of the California High-Speed Rail project.

As of 2024, Amtrak plans to reconstruct the platforms for accessibility by FY 2025.

== Service ==
The station is served by the Metrolink 91/Perris Valley Line and Orange County Line commuter rail services, plus Amtrak intercity Pacific Surfliner and long-distance Southwest Chief services. However, eastbound and westbound Southwest Chief trains stop only to board and discharge passengers, respectively.

The BNSF Railway San Bernardino Subdivision has three tracks through the station. Westbound passenger trains use the north track and its side platform; eastbound trains use the south track and side platform. The center track is for freight use only. An additional siding track with a side platform south of the mainline tracks is used for short turn trains that run between Fullerton and Laguna Niguel or Oceanside.

Fullerton Train Museum
- Established: 2001
- Location: Fullerton, California
- Coordinates: 33.869069137506536°N 117.92173663640419°W
- Type: Railroad museum
- Website: https://fullertontrainmuseum.org/

== Fullerton Train Museum ==
The Fullerton Train Museum is a railroad museum in Fullerton, California. The museum is operated by a non-profit organization and allows free entry. The museum also provides free guided tours biweekly on the first and third Saturdays through seven restored railroad cars, dated from 1929 to 1967. It also runs events to promote railroad safety for children and adults. Since its inception, The Fullerton Train Museum has annually hosted Railroad Days. The museum also holds spring, Halloween, and Christmas events.

The museum's permanent collection consists of seven cars and one locomotive, most conserved to "in-service" condition:

- Atchison, Topeka & Santa Fe 1604 Palm Leaf — a 10 roomette-6 double bedroom (10-6) lightweight sleeper built by American Car & Foundry in 1951 for the Super Chief. Later Amtrak 2753; private car registry PPCX 800237 before acquisition by SCRPA. The Palm Leaf is believed to be the last surviving car of Santa Fe's Palm-series sleepers.
- Atchison, Topeka & Santa Fe 999110 — Ce-1 class cupola caboose (waycar) built by American Car & Foundry in 1929.
- Southern Pacific 4049 — C-40-4 class bay-window caboose built by Pacific Car & Foundry in 1961.
- Union Pacific 3752 (ex-UP 25052) — CA-3 class tall-cupola caboose built by Mount Vernon Car Manufacturing Company in 1942; moved to Fullerton in November 2015 for display with the existing cabooses.
- Union Pacific 5001 Starlight Cafe — 85-ft lunch-counter diner-lounge rebuilt by Union Pacific from its 5000-series diner-lounge cars; owned by the Pacific Railroad Society (PRS) and on long-term loan to SCRPA at Fullerton.
- Union Pacific 6101 Cajon Pass — 85-ft dormitory-lounge built by ACF in 1949; owned by PRS and on long-term loan to SCRPA at Fullerton.
- Union Pacific 5492 — St. Louis Car "Chair" coach; sold to Amtrak in 1985(4. Amtrak 4552), then used in Glendale, California as part of the Carney's hot dog restaurant chain. Moved to the Fullerton Train Museum in October, 2024, it is being converted into a display and activity area.
- Metrolink 851 — EMD F59PH; The first rostered locomotive built for Metrolink in 1992. Used for commuter train service until 2024. Moved to the Fullerton Train Museum in January 2026.

== See also ==
- List of railway museums in the United States
