= Anaheim Canyon station =

Passenger train station in Anaheim, California, United States

Anaheim Canyon
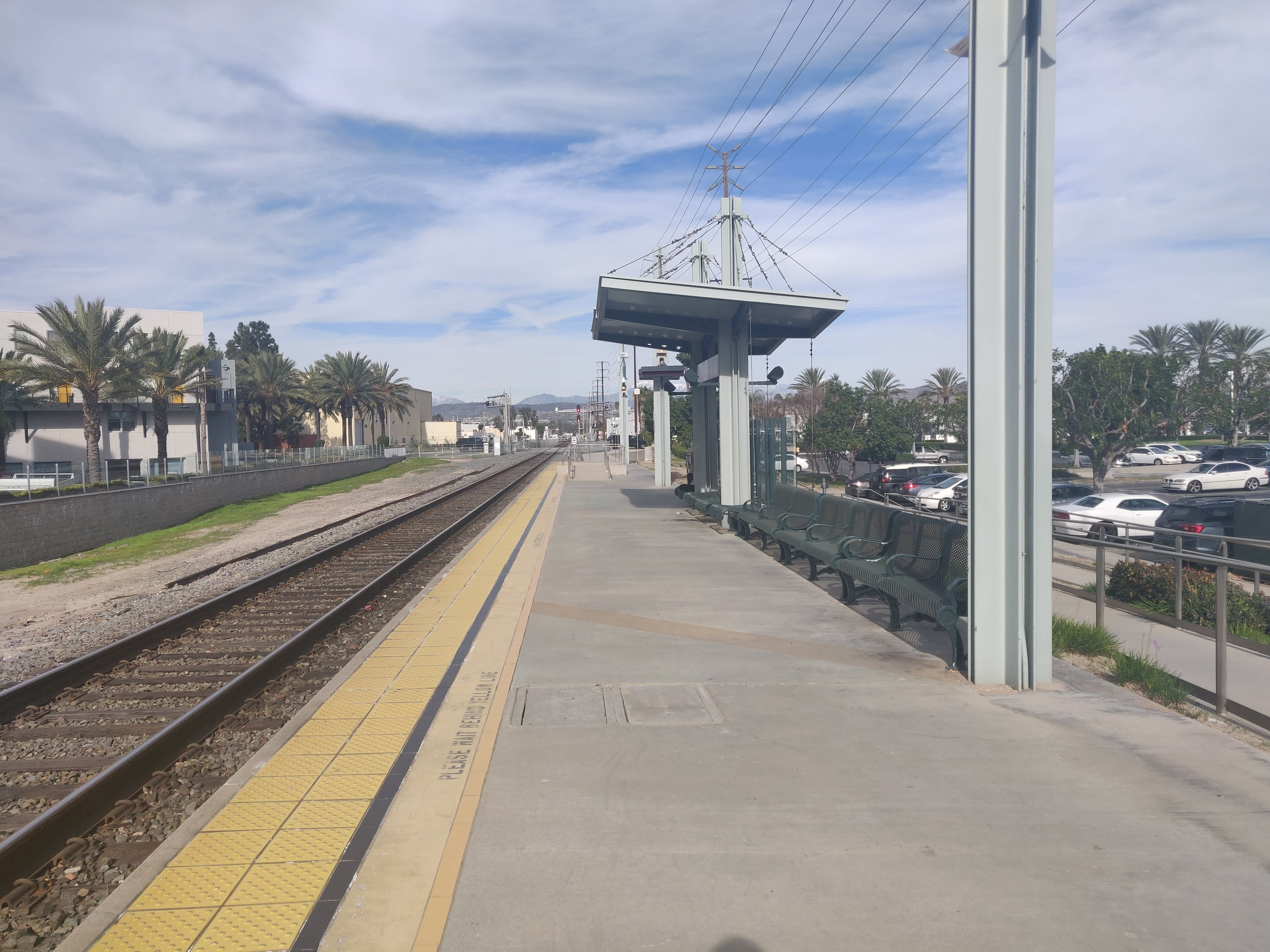
- Anaheim Canyon station platform in 2020 before the second track and platform was added

General information
- Location: 1039 North Pacificenter Drive; Anaheim, California
- Coordinates: 33°51′15″N 117°50′26″W
- Owner: City of Anaheim
- Line: SCRRA Olive Subdivision
- Platforms: 2 side platforms
- Tracks: 2
- Bus stands: 4
- Connections: OC Bus: 38, 71, 123

Construction
- Parking: 149 spaces, 8 accessible spaces
- Cycle facilities: Racks
- Accessible: Yes

History
- Opened: August 5, 1996; 30 years ago

Passengers
- FY 2026: 164 (avg. wkdy boardings)

Services
Preceding station	Metrolink	Following station
Orange toward Oceanside	Inland Empire–Orange County Line	Corona–West toward San Bernardino–Downtown
Former services
Preceding station	Atchison, Topeka and Santa Fe Railway	Following station
Orange toward Los Angeles	Main Line Via Fullerton, Riverside	Corona toward Chicago
Location

Anaheim Canyon station is a Metrolink train station in Anaheim, California, United States, served by the Inland Empire–Orange County Line. The station is adjacent to the Anaheim Canyon industrial and professional area. It is also a stop for Orange County Transportation Authority buses.

Anaheim Canyon station is served by 14 Metrolink Inland Empire–Orange County Line trains (7 in each direction) each weekday, running primarily at peak hours in the peak direction of travel. Weekend service consists of 4 trains (2 in each direction) on both Saturday and Sunday, heading towards Orange County in the morning and towards the Inland Empire in the evening.

In 2021, work began on improvements including a 3,400-foot (1,000 m) second track with a second passenger platform. The project also includes an extension of the existing passenger platform and improvements to grade crossings at nearby La Palma Avenue and North Tustin Avenue. The second track and new platform were completed in 2023.
