= Riverside station =

Riverside Station may refer to:

== Train stations in the United Kingdom ==
- Avon Riverside railway station in Bitton
- Barking Riverside railway station in Barking
- Beckton Riverside station in Beckton
- Cardiff Riverside Junction railway station in Cardiff
- Liverpool Riverside railway station in Liverpool
- Matlock Riverside railway station in Matlock
- Preston Riverside railway station in Preston
- Tilbury Riverside railway station in Tilbury
- Totnes (Riverside) railway station in Littlehempston
- Windsor & Eton Riverside railway station in Windsor

== Train stations in the United States ==
- Stations in Riverside, California:
  - Riverside-Downtown station, an Amtrak and Metrolink station
  - Riverside-La Sierra station, a Metrolink station
  - Riverside–Hunter Park/UCR station, a Metrolink station
  - Riverside station (Union Pacific Railroad), a former Union Pacific Railroad station
- Riverside station (Illinois) in Riverside, Illinois
- Riverside station (MBTA) in Newton, Massachusetts
- Riverside station (Metro-North) in Greenwich, Connecticut
- Riverside station (New York) in Riparius, New York
- Riverside station (River Line) in Riverside Township, New Jersey
- Cedar–Riverside station in Minneapolis, Minnesota

== Other ==
- Riverside station (OC Transpo) in Ottawa, Canada
- Riverside Generating Station in Dundalk, Maryland
