= Greyhound Mexico =

Greyhound subsidiary

Greyhound de Mexico
- Parent: Greyhound Lines
- Founded: 1958
- Headquarters: Mexico City
- Service area: Mexico; United States
- Website: Official Website

Greyhound de México, S.A. de C.V. is a Mexican non-carrier subsidiary of Dallas, Texas, based Greyhound Lines, providing marketing services in Spanish for other subsidiary companies with cross-border bus routes. Greyhound Lines has two subsidiaries operating in Mexico, each of which provide service to destinations in northern Mexico: Greyhound Lines México, S. de R.L. de C.V., serving points within Mexico and between Mexico and the United States; and Americanos U.S.A., L.L.C., serving the cross-border market. Greyhound Lines have also entered into an agreement with Grupo Estrella Blanca, the largest bus operator in Mexico, and other Mexican bus lines, all of which provide connections to many more destinations.

== Americanos U.S.A. ==
Americanos U.S.A., L.L.C. is a Delaware company based in Dallas Texas, with cross-border bus services operating between Tijuana, Baja California, and San Ysidro, California; Mexicali, Baja California, and Calexico, California; Ciudad Juárez, Chihuahua, and El Paso, Texas; Nuevo Laredo, Tamaulipas, and Laredo, Texas; Reynosa, Tamaulipas, and McAllen, Texas; and Matamoros, Tamaulipas, and Brownsville, Texas. Greyhound started the service in 1999.

== Greyhound Lines México ==
Greyhound Lines México, S. de R.L. de C.V. is a Mexican company based in Monterrey, Nuevo León, with services operating within Mexico, between Monterrey, Nuevo León, and Nuevo Laredo, Tamaulipas, and continuing across the border into Laredo, Texas. Greyhound started the service on July 15, 2015.
