= OC Bus =

Transit bus system in Orange County, California

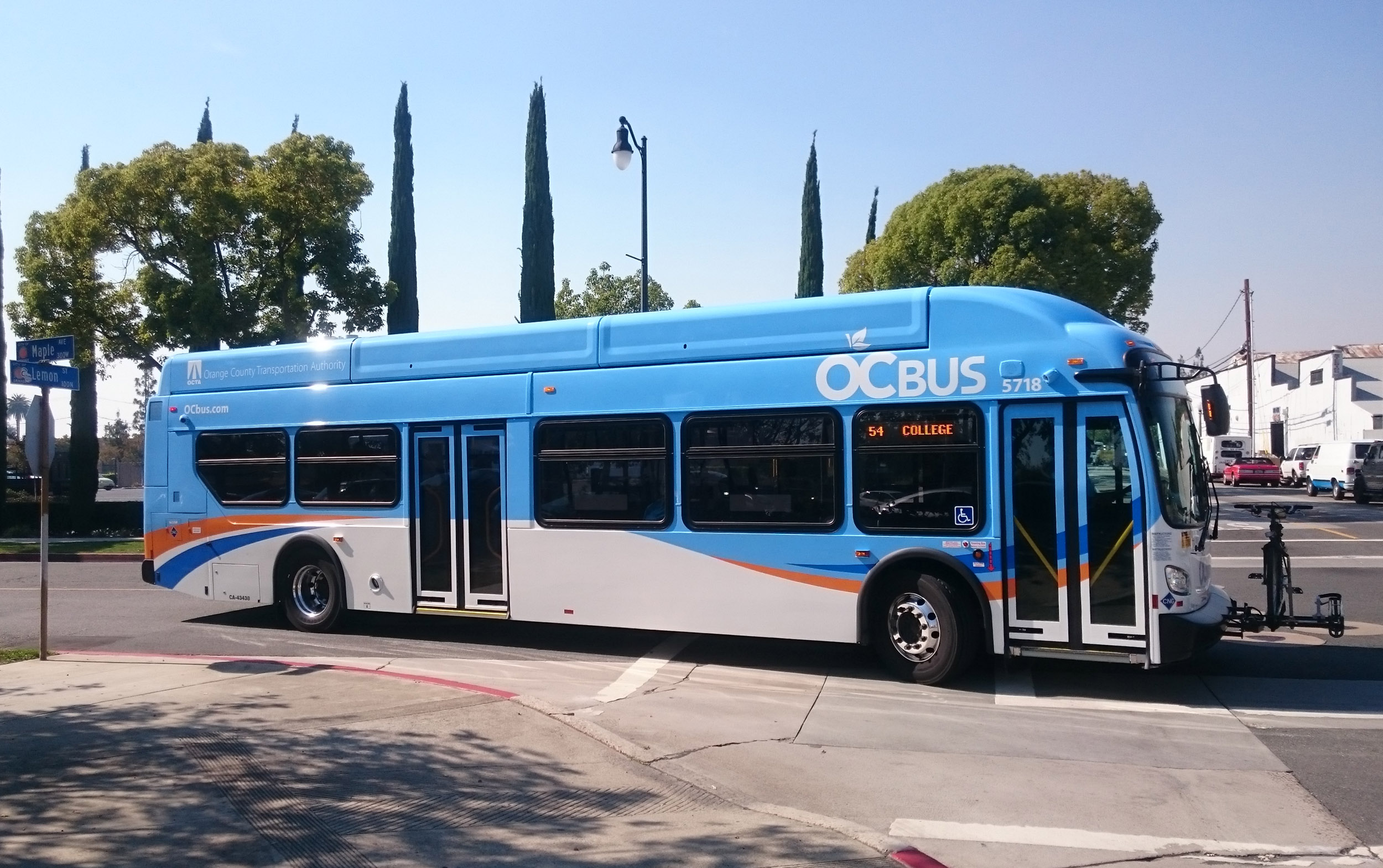
- OC Bus in Orange, California
- Parent: Orange County Transportation Authority (OCTA)
- Founded: August 1972 as the Orange County Transit District
- Headquarters: 550 S. Main St; Orange, California, USA
- Service area: Orange County
- Service type: Transit bus
- Routes: 51
- Stops: 5,161
- Fleet: 449 buses
- Daily ridership: 115,100 (weekdays, Q2 2026)
- Annual ridership: 36,571,900 (2025)
- Fuel type: CNG, battery electric, hydrogen fuel cell
- Operator: OCTA; Keolis (Anaheim & Irvine); Transdev (OC ACCESS)
- Website: Official website

OC Bus is the transit bus service operated by the Orange County Transportation Authority (OCTA), serving every city in Orange County. Some of the lines serve the Los Angeles County border communities of Lakewood, La Mirada, Cerritos, Artesia, Hawaiian Gardens, and Long Beach. As of November 2025, there are 51 routes in the system.

The agency is the second-largest public transportation provider in the metropolitan area after the Los Angeles County Metropolitan Transportation Authority. Its predecessor agencies include not only the prior Orange County Transit District but also such diverse entities as the Pacific Electric Railway and the South Coast Transit Corporation. In 2005, OCTA was judged America's Best Public Transportation System by the American Public Transportation Association, for its record gains in bus and Metrolink commuter trains ridership that it operates or funds.

The Authority's administrative offices are located in the city of Orange and it maintains bus operations bases in the cities of Garden Grove, and Santa Ana. Keolis operates about 40% of OCTA's Fixed Routes out of the Anaheim and Irvine bases, while Transdev operates OCTA's paratransit base for the authority's ACCESS service, also in Irvine.

All OCTA buses are equipped with bike racks, articulated buses carry two bike racks, while the rest of the fleet carry three bike racks. In addition, all OCTA buses come with free WiFi onboard.

The longest is route 1 (Long Beach–San Clemente) which utilizes Pacific Coast Highway for the vast majority of its 40-mile (64 km) route, with trips take an average of 2 to 2.5 hours.

== Routes ==
=== 1-99 (Local Routes) ===
Routes with numbers less than 100 are fixed routes that cover almost every city in Orange County. Buses operate on most major arterial streets. Route 1 is the only single-digit route, acquiring the number from California State Route 1.

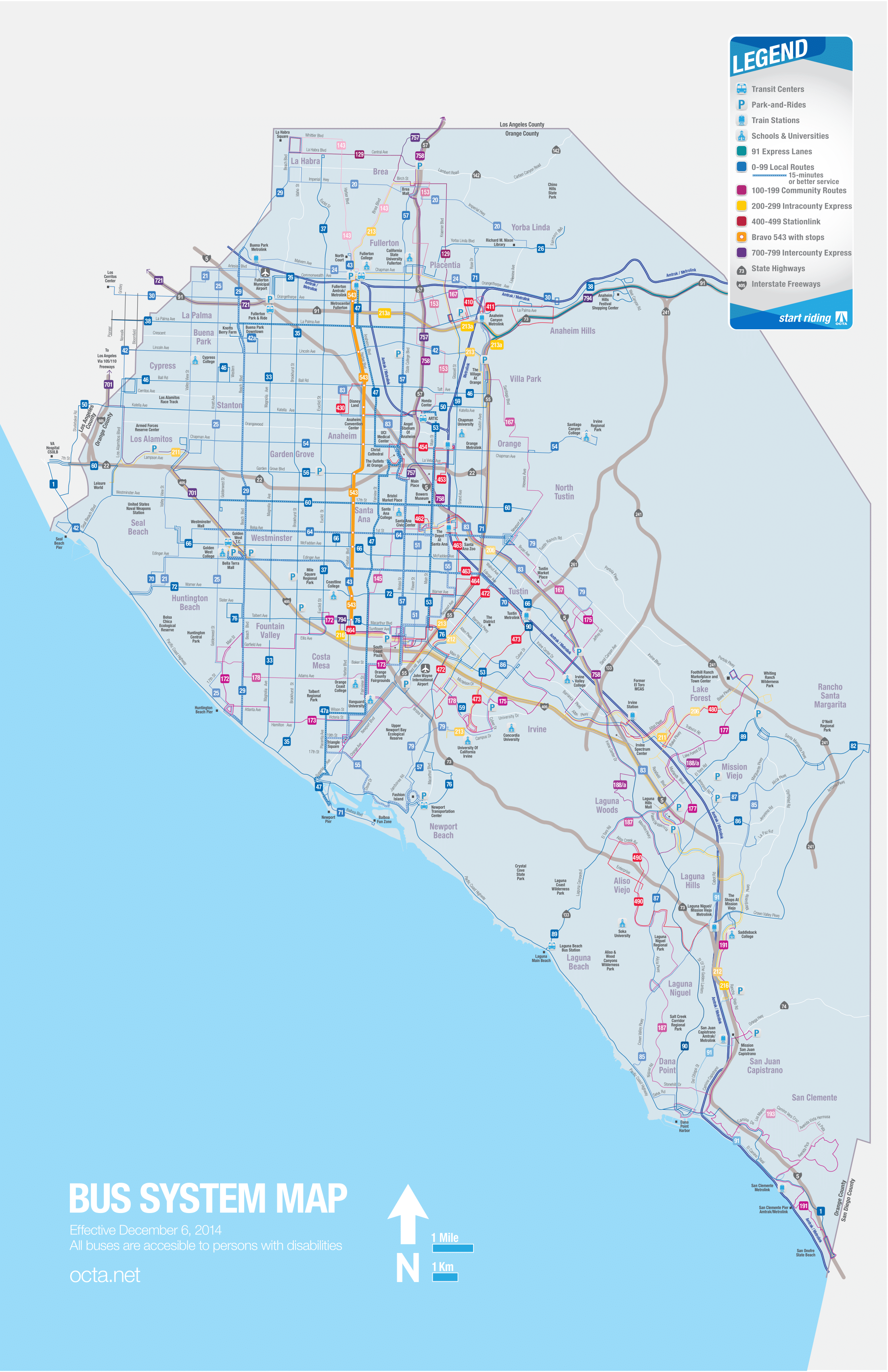
Map of the OCTA bus system

| Route | Terminals | | via | Notes |
|---|---|---|---|---|
| 1 | Long Beach Cal State Long Beach | San Clemente El Camino Real & Avenida Santa Margarita | Pacific Coast Hwy | Longest OCTA Bus route; Serves Newport Transportation Center |
| 1 | Newport Beach Newport Transportation Center (short line) | San Clemente El Camino Real & Avenida Santa Margarita | Pacific Coast Hwy | Longest OCTA Bus route; Serves Newport Transportation Center |
| 25 | Fullerton Fullerton Park & Ride | Huntington Beach Pacific Coast Hwy & 1st St | Goldenwest St, Knott Av | |
| 26 | Fullerton Fullerton Park & Ride | Yorba Linda Lemon Dr & Main St | Commonwealth Av, Yorba Linda Bl | Serves Fullerton Transportation Center and Cal State Fullerton |
| 29A | Buena Park Buena Park Metrolink Station | Huntington Beach Pacific Coast Hwy & 1st St | Beach Bl | Operates alongside Rapid Route 529 between Fullerton Park & Ride and Goldenwest Transportation Center; Serves Knott's Berry Farm |
| 29A | Buena Park Buena Park Metrolink Station | Huntington Beach Pacific Coast Hwy & 1st St | Beach Bl | Serves Knott's Berry Farm, Goldenwest Transportation Center and Golden West College |
| 30 | Cerritos Los Cerritos Center | Anaheim Hills Esperanza Rd & Fairlynn Bl | Orangethorpe Av | Serves Fullerton Park and Ride |
| 33 | Fullerton Fullerton Park & Ride | Huntington Beach Pacific Coast Hwy & Magnolia St | Magnolia St | |
| 35 | Fullerton Fullerton Park & Ride | Costa Mesa Park Av and 19th St | Brookhurst St, Orangethorpe Ave | |
| 37 | La Habra 1st Av & Euclid St | Fountain Valley MacArthur Bl & Hyland Av | Euclid St | |
| 38 | Cerritos Los Cerritos Center | Anaheim Hills Esperanza Rd & Fairlynn Bl | Del Amo Bl, La Palma Av | Serves Knott's Berry Farm, Buena Park Downtown and Anaheim Canyon Metrolink Station |
| 42/A | Long Beach Norwalk Bl & Wardlow Av | Orange The Village at Orange | Los Alamitos Bl, Lincoln Av | Serves Cypress College; Route 42A serves Braille Institute on Dale St and Crescent Av |
| 43 | Fullerton Berkeley Av & Harbor Bl | Costa Mesa Park Av and 19th St | Harbor Bl | Operates alongside Rapid Route 543 between MacArthur Bl and Fullerton Transportation Center; Serves Fullerton College, Fullerton Transportation Center, Disneyland and Orange Coast College |
| 46 | Seal Beach Electric Av and Main St | Orange The Village at Orange | Ball Rd, Taft Av, Los Alamitos Bl, Seal Beach Bl | Serves Disneyland |
| 46 | Long Beach Norwalk Bl & Wardlow Av (short line) | Orange The Village at Orange | Ball Rd, Taft Av, Los Alamitos Bl, Seal Beach Bl | Serves Disneyland |
| 47 | Fullerton Fullerton Transportation Center | Newport Beach Balboa Bl & 23rd St | Anaheim Bl, Fairview St | Serves The Outlets at Orange and Orange Coast College |
| 50 | Long Beach Cal State Long Beach | Orange The Village at Orange | Katella Av | Serves Disneyland, Angel Stadium and ARTIC |
| 53 | Anaheim Anaheim Regional Transportation Intermodal Center | Irvine Yale Loop & Alton Pkwy | Main St | Operates alongside Rapid Route 553; Serves MainPlace Mall |
| 53 | Anaheim Anaheim Regional Transportation Intermodal Center | Santa Ana MacArthur Bl & Main St (short line) | Main St | Operates alongside Rapid Route 553; Serves MainPlace Mall |
| 54 | Garden Grove Chapman Av & Valley View St | Orange Santiago Canyon College (Mon-Sat) | Chapman Av | Does not operate east of Rancho Santiago Bl on Sundays; Serves Orange station |
| 54 | Garden Grove Chapman Av & Valley View St | Orange Rancho Santiago Bl & Chapman Av (Sun) | Chapman Av | Does not operate east of Rancho Santiago Bl on Sundays; Serves Orange station |
| 55 | Santa Ana Flower St & 6th St | Newport Beach Newport Transportation Center | Standard Av, Bristol St, Fairview St, 17th St | Serves South Coast Plaza and Orange Coast College |
| 56 | Garden Grove Chapman Av & Valley View St (early AM / late PM) | Orange; Orange station | Garden Grove Bl | |
| 56 | Garden Grove Belgrave Av & Valley View St | Orange; Orange station | Garden Grove Bl | |
| 57 | Brea Brea Mall | Newport Beach; Newport Transportation Center | State College Bl, Bristol St, Jamboree Rd | Serves Cal State Fullerton, Angel Stadium, The Outlets at Orange, Santa Ana College, and South Coast Plaza |
| 57 | Fullerton Cal State Fullerton (short line) | Costa Mesa Anton Bl & Sakioka Dr (short line) | State College Bl, Bristol St, Jamboree Rd | Serves Cal State Fullerton, Angel Stadium, The Outlets at Orange, Santa Ana College, and South Coast Plaza |
| 59 | Brea; Brea Mall | Irvine UC Irvine | Birch St, Kraemer Bl, Glassell St, Grand Av, Von Karman Av | Serves Orange station and Santa Ana Regional Transportation Center |
| 60 | Long Beach Cal State Long Beach | Tustin; Larwin Square | Westminster Ave, 17th St | Operates alongside Rapid Route 560; Serves Santa Ana College |
| 60 | Westminster Main St & Locust St (weekends) | Santa Ana Fruit St & Tustin Av (weekends) | Westminster Ave, 17th St | Operates alongside Rapid Route 560; Serves Santa Ana College |
| 64 | Westminster Westminster Mall | Tustin Larwin Square | Bolsa Av, 1st St | |
| 66 | Huntington Beach Goldenwest Transportation Center | Irvine Irvine Valley College | McFadden Av, Walnut Av | |
| 66 | Huntington Beach Goldenwest Transportation Center | Tustin Bryan Av & Newport Av (short line) | McFadden Av, Walnut Av | |
| 70 | Huntington Beach Warner Av & Pacific Coast Hwy | Tustin Tustin Metrolink Station | Edinger Av | Serves Golden West College and Goldenwest Transportation Center |
| 71 | Yorba Linda UCI Health–Placentia | Newport Beach Superior Av & Placentia Av | Tustin Av, Red Hill Av, Newport Bl | Serves The Village at Orange |
| 72 | Huntington Beach Warner Av & Pacific Coast Hwy | Tustin Tustin Metrolink Station | Warner Av | Serves The District Of Tustin |
| 76 | Huntington Beach Talbert Av & Beach Bl | Santa Ana John Wayne Airport | Talbert Av, MacArthur Bl | |
| 79 | Tustin; Larwin Square | Newport Beach Newport Transportation Center | Bryan Av, Culver Dr, University Dr | Serves UC Irvine |
| 83 | Fullerton Fullerton Park & Ride | Laguna Hills Laguna Hills Transportation Center | I-5, Main St | Serves Disneyland, MainPlace Mall and Santa Ana Regional Transportation Center |
| 85 | Laguna Niguel Niguel Rd & Crown Valley Pkwy | Mission Viejo Portola Plaza | Marguerite Pkwy, Crown Valley Pkwy | Serves The Shops at Mission Viejo and Saddleback College |
| 86 | Costa Mesa South Coast Plaza | Mission Viejo Oso Viejo Community Park | Alton Pkwy, Jeronimo Rd | Serves Irvine Spectrum Center and Irvine Transportation Center |
| 89 | Mission Viejo; Portola Plaza | Laguna Beach Laguna Beach Bus Station | El Toro Rd, Laguna Canyon Rd | Serves Laguna Hills Transportation Center |
| 90 | Tustin Tustin Metrolink Station | Dana Point Golden Lantern & Dana Point Harbor Dr | Irvine Center Dr, Moulton Pkwy, Golden Lantern St | Serves Irvine Valley College and Irvine Spectrum Center |
| 91 | Laguna Hills Laguna Hills Transportation Center | San Clemente Calle de Los Molinos & Avenida Pico | Paseo De Valencia, Camino Capistrano, Del Obispo St | Serves The Shops at Mission Viejo and Saddleback College |

=== 100s (Community Routes) ===
Routes with numbers in the 100s descended from the old RunAbout service that formerly served residential neighborhoods, or provide service to portions of 1-99 routes that have reduced demand. Three routes (129, 143, 153) were truncated from routes 29, 43, 47, 53, and 59 as a result of March 2010 service change; the 153 was later discontinued in February 2023. These routes are operated by Keolis, although between February 2022 and June 2023 OCTA temporarily operated many of these routes in-house except for the 129, 143, and 177, likely due to contractor driver shortages.

| Route | Terminals | | via | Notes |
|---|---|---|---|---|
| 123 | Anaheim Anaheim Canyon Metrolink Station | Huntington Beach Goldenwest Transportation Center | Artesia Bl, Malvern Av, Chapman Av, Valley View St, Bolsa Chica Rd | Serves Cal State Fullerton, Fullerton Transportation Center, Fullerton College, Buena Park Metrolink Station, Cypress College, and Golden West College |
| 129 | Buena Park Buena Park Metrolink Station | Brea Brea Mall | Beach Bl, La Habra Bl, Brea Bl, Birch St | Serves Brea Mall |
| 143 | La Habra Beach Bl & La Habra Bl | Brea Brea Mall | Whittier Bl, Harbor Bl, Brea Bl, Birch St | Serves Fullerton Transportation Center and Cal State Fullerton |
| 150 | Santa Ana Flower St & 6th St | | Flower St, Fairview St | Clockwise route; Serves South Coast Plaza and Santa Ana College |
| 151 | Santa Ana Flower St & 6th St | | Flower St, Fairview St | Counter-clockwise route; Serves South Coast Plaza and Santa Ana College |
| 167 | Orange The Village at Orange | Irvine UC Irvine | Meats Av, Santiago Bl, Wanda Rd, Hewes St, Newport Av, Irvine Bl, Jeffrey Rd, Campus Dr | Serves Irvine Valley College |
| 177 | Laguna Niguel Niguel Rd and Crown Valley Pkwy | Mission Viejo Los Alisos Blvd and Mustang Run | Alicia Pkwy, Muirlands Bl, Lake Forest Dr, Portola Pkwy, Santa Margarita Pkwy | Serves Laguna Hills Transportation Center |
| 178 | Huntington Beach Yorktown Av & Goldenwest St | Irvine UC Irvine | Adams Av, Birch St, Campus Dr | Serves Orange Coast College |

=== 400s (StationLink) ===
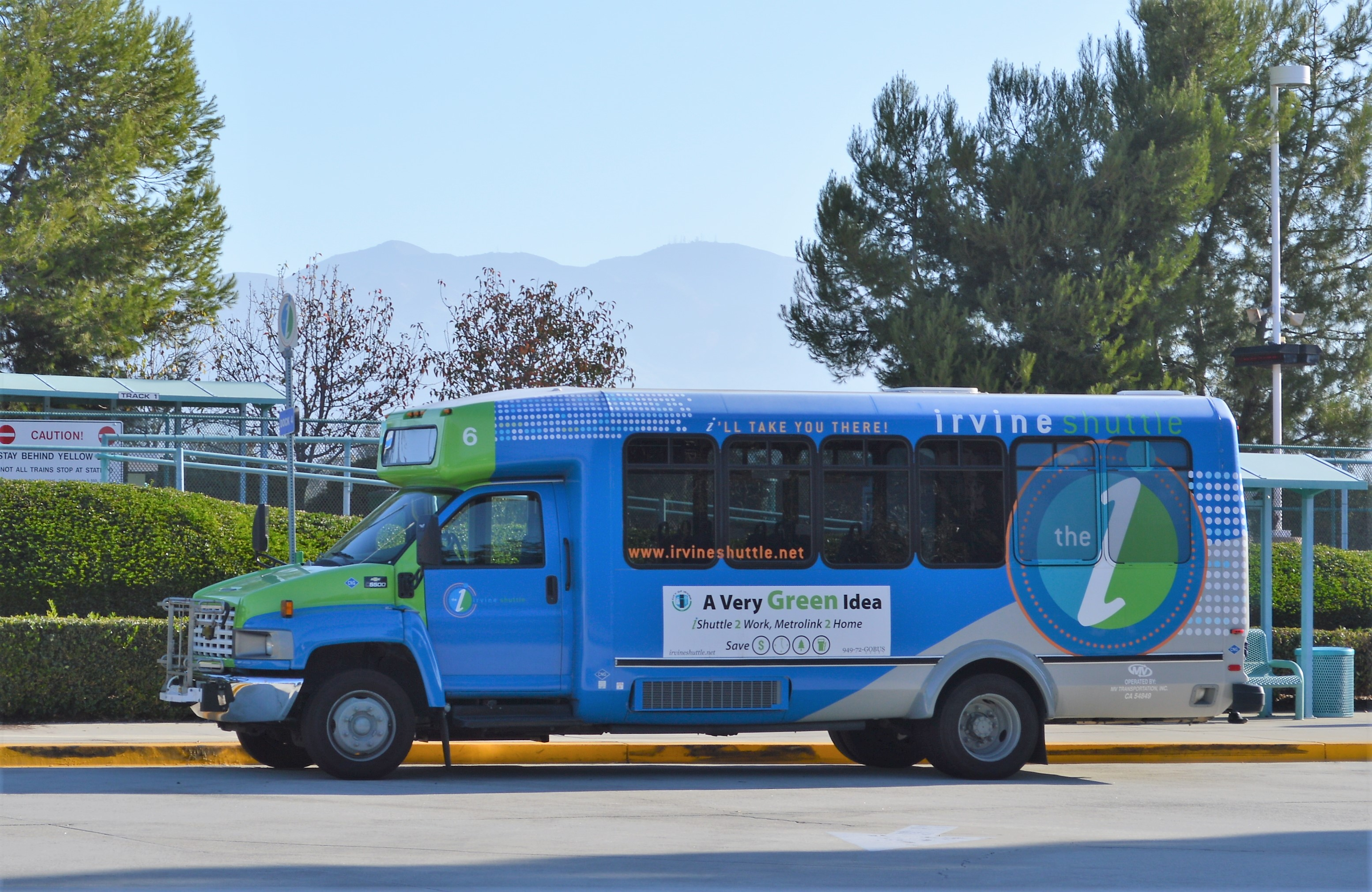
Irvine Shuttle (iShuttle), operated by the OCTA at the Irvine Transportation Center in Irvine, California

Routes with numbers in the 400s are "StationLink" routes which travel between Metrolink stations and business districts. These routes operate only during weekday rush hours and do not operate reverse peak services. These routes are operated by Keolis.

| Route | Terminals | | via | Notes |
|---|---|---|---|---|
| 453 | Orange Orange station | Orange La Veta Av & Pepper St | Chapman Av, Main St, La Veta Av | Served from/to Metrolink Rail Line Stations |
| 472 | Tustin Tustin Metrolink Station | Irvine Food and Drug Administration | Edinger Av, Red Hill Av, Campus Dr, Jamboree Rd | Served from/to Metrolink Rail Line Stations |
| 473 | Tustin Tustin Metrolink Station | Irvine UC Irvine | Edinger Av, Harvard Av | Served from/to Metrolink Rail Line Stations |
| 480 | Irvine Irvine Transportation Center | Lake Forest Lake Forest Dr & Regency Ln | Alton Pkwy, Bake Pkwy, Lake Forest Dr | Served from/to Metrolink Rail Line Stations |

==== Former iShuttle services ====
Until June 28, 2025, OC Bus operated the iShuttle bus service.

| Route | Terminals | | via | Notes |
|---|---|---|---|---|
| 400A | Tustin Tustin Metrolink Station | Santa Ana; John Wayne Airport | Von Karman Av | Irvine Shuttle (iShuttle) service |
| 401B | Tustin Tustin Metrolink Station | Irvine 2101 Business Center | Jamboree Rd, Michelson Dr | Irvine Shuttle (iShuttle) service |
| 403D | Irvine Irvine Transportation Center | Irvine Irvine Center Dr & Sand Canyon Av | Alton Pkwy | Irvine Shuttle (iShuttle) service |

=== 500s (Rapid Routes) ===
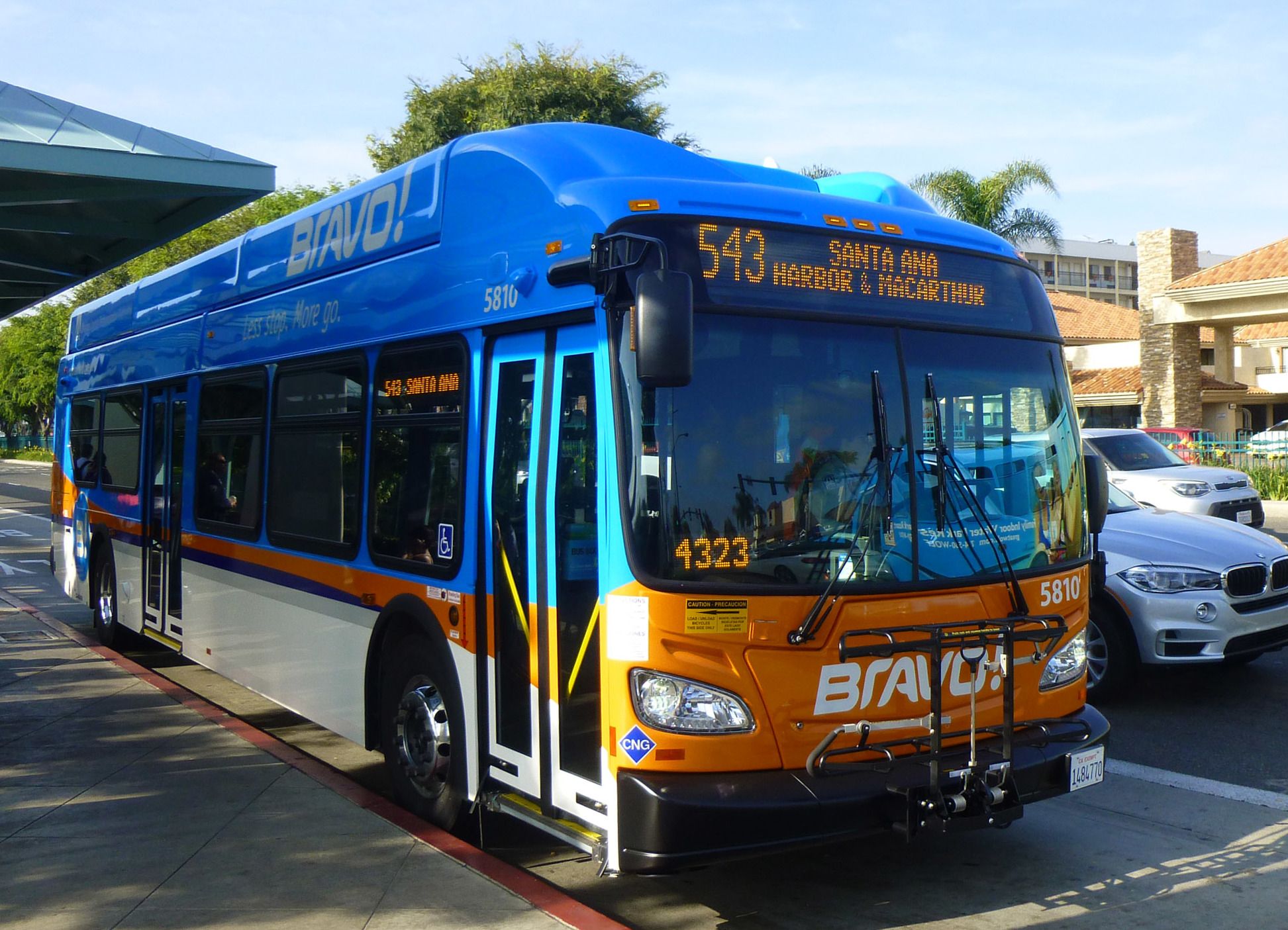
OC Bus on Rapid Route 543 at Disneyland Resort in Anaheim, California

Routes with numbers in the 500s are "Rapid" routes that operate on heavily used routes making limited stops and at transfer points to other routes. It is named according to the parent route it accompanies, for adding the number five to the beginning of the route indicating that it is a Rapid express route. Rapid routes use a dedicated fleet of buses and have different color schemes from regular route buses.

| Route | Terminals | | via | Notes |
|---|---|---|---|---|
| 529 | Fullerton Goldenwest Transportation Center | Fullerton Fullerton Park & Ride | Beach Bl | Limited stop service; Operates alongside Route 29/29A; Serves Knott's Berry Farm |
| 543 | Fullerton Fullerton Transportation Center | Costa Mesa Harbor Bl & MacArthur Bl | Harbor Bl | Limited stop service; Operates alongside Route 43; Serves Disneyland |
| 553 | Anaheim Disneyland | Costa Mesa Sunflower Av & Bristol St | Main St, Katella Av | Limited stop service; Operates alongside Route 53; Serves MainPlace Mall; Serves ARTIC |
| 560 | Santa Ana Santa Ana Regional Transportation Center | Westminster Main St & Locust St | 17th St, Westminster Av | Limited stop service; Operates alongside Route 60; Serves Santa Ana College |

=== 800s (City Shuttle) ===
Routes with numbers in the 800s are City Shuttle routes. Route 862, the first and only 800 series route, serving as a circulator route in Downtown Santa Ana and was introduced in October 2019, replacing former StationLink Route 462.

| Route | Terminals | via | Notes |
|---|---|---|---|
| 862 | Santa Ana Santa Ana Regional Transportation Center | Civic Center Dr | Counter-clockwise route |

== Bus fleet ==
=== Active fleet ===
| Image | Make/Model | Fleet numbers | Year | Propulsion | Assigned Divisions | Notes |
|---|---|---|---|---|---|---|
| | New Flyer XHE40 | 1111–1130 | 2018, 2025 | Hydrogen | Santa Ana | Funded in part by the California Air Resources Board's Low Carbon Transportation and Air Quality Improvement Program; 1121,1122 have not entered service yet, 1123-1130 have yet to be received |
| | New Flyer XE40 | 1201–1220 | 2021–2022, 2025 | Battery electric | Garden Grove, Santa Ana | 1203–1207 used in OC Bus Rapid service; 1211-1219 are 2025 vehicle, 1212, 1213, 1215 entered service 8/3/26; 1214, 1216-1220 have not entered service yet |
| | Gillig Low Floor Plus CNG 40' | 2101-2199, 2201-2266, 2301–2336 | 2021-2023 | CNG | Garden Grove; Santa Ana; Anaheim | 2101 is a 2021 pilot bus; 2306–2326 used in OC Bus Rapid service; 2102–2173 are 2022 models; 2174–2266 and 2301-2336 are 2023 models; 2327-2336 are with a Suburban Configuration; Buses are equipped with at-seat USB charging ports |
| | New Flyer C40LFR | 5501-5599, 5601-5678, 7501-7529 | 2006–2008 | CNG | Garden Grove | All but 4 5500s were retired; All 5600s and 29 buses in the 7500s retired; 13 units were sold to the Santa Cruz Metro |
| | New Flyer C40LFR | 5121-5150, 7530-7592 | 2008 | CNG | Garden Grove Santa Ana | Some of the 7500s were retired |
| | New Flyer XN40 | 5701–5799, 5801–5858 | 2015–2017 | CNG | Anaheim; Irvine; Santa Ana | 5801–5814 formerly used in OC Bus Rapid service, later replaced with OC Bus decals for use in local service.; 5701 is a 2015 model, all other subsequent units are 2016 models |
| | New Flyer XN40 | 5861–5866 | 2018 | CNG | Santa Ana | Formerly used in Bravo service, later replaced with OC Bus decals for use in local service. |
| | Gillig Low Floor Plus CNG 29' | 6381–6392 | 2020–2021 | CNG | Irvine | Formerly used on the Irvine Shuttle (iShuttle) service, now transferred to Irvine Connect shuttle service in 2025. |
| | New Flyer XN60 | 7601–7620 | 2013 | CNG | Santa Ana | 7617 was retired in April 2025 |
| | New Flyer XN60 | 7621–7636 | 2016 | CNG | Santa Ana | |

== See also ==
- Bus stations in Orange County, California
- Bus transportation in California
- Public transportation in Orange County, California topics
