= The Village at Orange =

- Location: Orange, California
- Coordinates: 33.8259°N 117.8382°W
- Opened: August 16, 1971; 55 years ago
- Closed: January 31, 2024; 2 years ago (interior only)
- Num. of stores: 75
- Num. of anchor tenants: 10 (8 open, 2 vacant)
- Floor area: 855,911 square feet (79,516.7 m^{2})
- Floors: 1 (2 in former Sears)

The Village at Orange, formerly known as the Orange Mall and later as The Mall of Orange, is an outdoor shopping center and a former small enclosed shopping mall located in Orange, California, United States. The mall, one of Orange's first, opened for consumer entry in 1971, and was composed of both internal merchants and external anchor tenant buildings, the original latter of which only Walmart remains operational. In September 2023, TVO Management, the mall's property manager, announced that the internal portion of the mall would close on or by January 31, 2024. The mall ceased internal operations on the date provided by TVO Management, marking the end of 52 years of constant public operation in Northern Orange. The Village at Orange currently operates as a conventional outdoor shopping center.

== History ==
In 1967, a "standalone" Sears department store opened to customers on what had been an empty commercial lot at the intersection of North Tustin Street and East Meats Avenue in the city of Orange, California.

In 1970, plans for an enclosed shopping mall and several external anchor facilities to be erected on the remainder of the lot and attached to the Sears department store emerged. This proposed shopping center, constructed on a 63-acre (25 ha) portion of the lot, would cost $30 million to build and was designated as the “Orange Mall." The developer was Harry Newman Jr., president of Newman Properties (Long Beach, California) and president of the International Council of Shopping Centers. The architectural firm was Ainsworth & McClellan (Pasadena, California). In accordance with the intended design, an anchor tenant location of the department chain The Broadway would be constructed at a size of 167,500 square feet (15,560 m^{2}) and the preexisting Sears department store accounting for 273,500 square feet (25,410 m^{2}), with the mall's total size being 900,000 square feet (84,000 m^{2}), featuring 80 internal retail stores and a parking lot designed for 4,700 vehicles. The mall also hosted frequent community events, seasonal shopping themes and decorations, and had a dedicated play area for children. It would be the first mall in Southern California featuring wall-to-wall carpeting throughout its central interior. The mall opened for consumer entry on August 16, 1971.

On December 16, 1971, just four months following the grand opening of the mall, movie theater chain AMC announced the opening of their Orange Mall 6 location at the shopping center. The theater was billed as the first motion picture complex to support six full-sized viewing screens built on the West Coast of the United States. The theater was contained in a separate construction from the mall itself but on the same lot, and had 1,800 seats, with a proportional amount being divided separately amongst multiple rectangular viewing areas.

In 1977, a Woolworth's department store, which had been an anchor tenant of the mall, closed its doors and its retail construction was reoccupied by a JCPenney department store.

The Broadway department store at the mall closed in 1996 due to the chain being purchased by Macy's, and the site was renovated and repurposed for a new Walmart department store.

On April 20, 1997, AMC's Orange Mall 6 location closed its doors to customers.

The shopping center completed a $57 million renovation in 2003. The mall received a "facelift," new furnishings were installed, and an overall change in architecture and design of the mall was introduced in order to appeal to a younger demographic. Existing internal merchants received internal and external renovations, new internal merchant locations were built and opened, and a food court was added to the center's design, encircling the middle of the internal section of the mall.

In July 2009, Linens 'n Things closed its department store location at the mall, as part of the chain's bankruptcy and nationwide mass retail closure. Later that same year, a Sprouts Farmers Market opened at the site of the former Linens 'n Things location.

The internal, enclosed portion of the mall underwent a brief period of renovation in 2015.

On March 17, 2017, JCPenney announced the closure of its department store location at the mall, as part of a plan to close 138 stores nationwide. The store closed on July 31, 2017.

On January 29, 2021, Sears announced that it would also be closing its department store location at the mall on April 18 of that same year, as part of a plan to close 23 stores nationwide. This left Walmart as the only remaining operational retailer occupying an original anchor tenant building, with Sears having been the last original anchor tenant utilizing its inaugural building before its closure.

In 2022, Sears Auto Center, which had remained operational as a separate construction past the closure of the Sears department store of the previous year, stopped offering services to consumers and closed its doors.

On September 12, 2023, TVO Management, the property manager assigned to the mall, announced that plans had been made for The Village at Orange mall to cease operation and close its doors to consumer entry effective on or by January 31, 2024. The announcement was made via written correspondence to all tenants, internal and external, of the mall and its surrounding lot. "The evolution of the retail industry" and "a change in customer shopping preferences" were among the reasons cited by the property manager for the shutdown. The closure would only affect the internal, enclosed portion of the mall, and all merchants which also had externally-accessible entrances, as well as any remaining anchor tenants, would remain operational beyond this date.

The Interior of the Village at Orange closed on January 31, 2024, following years of poor fiscal performance, sub-par storefront and product selections, dysfunctional mall management, and a sharp decrease in clientele visitations. This marked the end of a 52-year operational reign, cementing the mall's legacy as one of the first and most-notable in the City of Orange. Demolition of the mall interior took place throughout 2024.

The tenants available from the outside of the mall or in buildings not connected to the main mall remain open including several restaurants and larger stores such as HomeGoods, PetSmart, CVS, and Trader Joe's.

CVS closed in the spring of 2024 along with Party City, which turned into an Ulta Beauty store. As of now, TVO Management plans to build residential housing units.
