= List of Metrolink (California) stations =

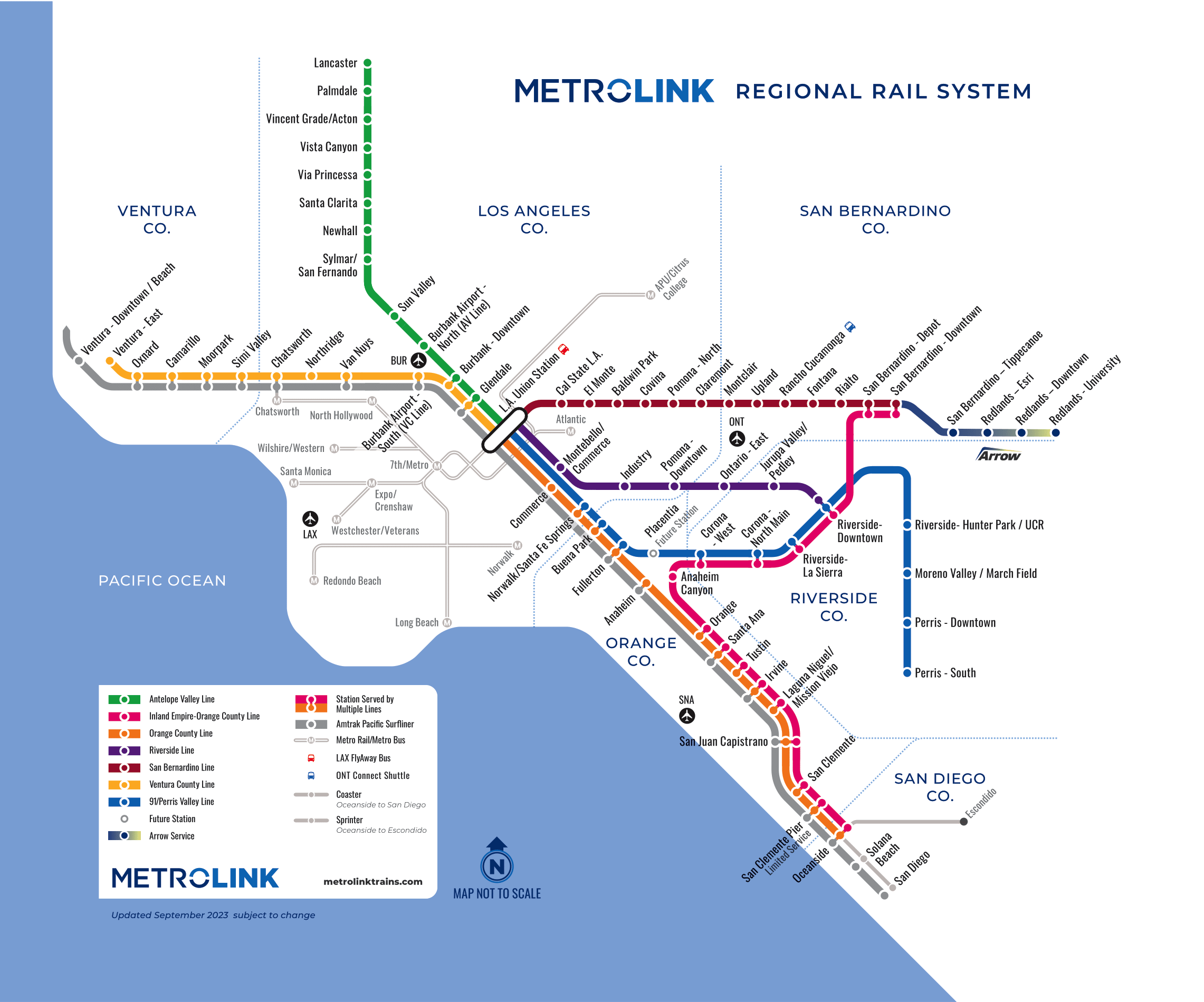
System map (as of September 2023)

Metrolink is the commuter rail system serving the Greater Los Angeles area of Southern California. The system is governed by the Southern California Regional Rail Authority (SCRRA) and operated under contract by Amtrak, serving five counties in the region—Orange, Los Angeles, Riverside, San Bernardino, and Ventura—as well as the city of Oceanside in San Diego County. The network consists of 68 stations along eight lines, with a total route length of 545.6 miles (878.1 km). Arrow is operated under a contract with the San Bernardino County Transportation Authority (SBCTA).

== Lines ==
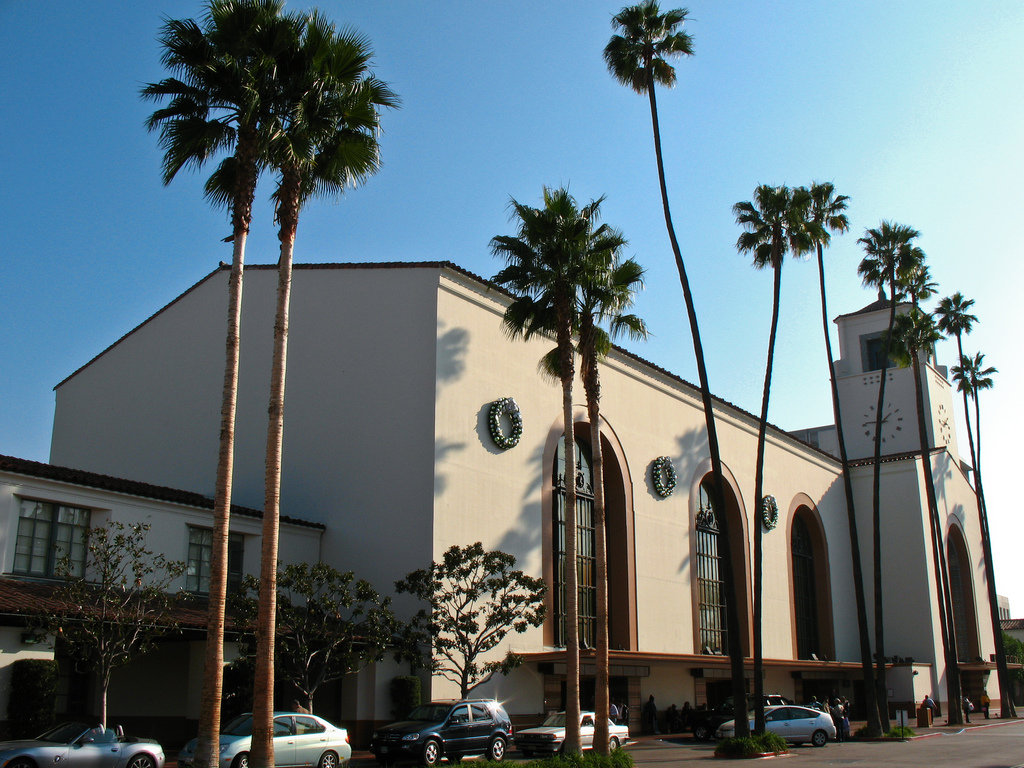
Union Station in Los Angeles serves as a hub for Metrolink, with six out of eight Metrolink lines terminating at the station.

Metrolink lines
Name	Length	Stations	Termini	Ridership (weekday)
Antelope Valley Line	76.6 miles (123.3 km)	13	Lancaster (north); L.A. Union Station (south)	3,876
Inland Empire–Orange County Line	100.1 miles (161.1 km)	16	San Bernardino–Downtown (north); Oceanside (south)	2,331
Orange County Line	87.2 miles (140.3 km)	15	L.A. Union Station (north); Oceanside (south)	5,116
Riverside Line	58.8 miles (94.6 km)	7	L.A. Union Station (west); Riverside–Downtown (east)	1,121
San Bernardino Line	56.5 miles (90.9 km)	16	L.A. Union Station (west); San Bernardino–Downtown (east); Redlands–Downtown (express only)	6,054
Ventura County Line	76.6 miles (123.3 km)	12	Ventura–East (west); L.A. Union Station (east)	2,457
91/Perris Valley Line	83.8 miles (134.9 km)	12	L.A. Union Station (west); Perris–South (east)	2,509
Arrow	9 miles (14 km)	5	San Bernardino–Downtown (west); Redlands–University (east)	478

== Stations ==
†	Termini

Station	Image	Line(s) (Note: Where more than one line serves a station, lines are listed in the order of opening.)	Rail connections	Location	Date opened	Wkdy. boardings	Ref(s).
Anaheim	The front of Anaheim station	Orange County Line	Amtrak: Pacific Surfliner	Anaheim	December 6, 2014	315	
Anaheim Canyon	The platform at Anaheim Canyon station	Inland Empire–Orange County Line		Anaheim	August 5, 1996	164	
Baldwin Park	The platform at Baldwin Park station	San Bernardino Line		Baldwin Park	May 24, 1993	216	
Buena Park	The platforms at Buena Park station	Orange County Line 91/Perris Valley Line		Buena Park	September 4, 2007	405	
Burbank Airport–North	The platform at Burbank Airport–North station	Antelope Valley Line		Burbank	May 14, 2018	100	
Burbank Airport–South	Burbank Airport–South station in 2012 when it was named Bob Hope Airport station	Ventura County Line	Amtrak: Pacific Surfliner Coast Starlight	Burbank	April 24, 1995	109	
Cal State L.A.	The pedestrian bridge at Cal State LA station connecting the Metrolink platform with the Metro Busway platform	San Bernardino Line		Los Angeles	October 26, 1994	380	
Camarillo	A train at Camarillo station	Ventura County Line	Amtrak: Pacific Surfliner	Camarillo	February 14, 1994	81	
Chatsworth	The platform and building at Chatsworth station	Ventura County Line	Amtrak: Pacific Surfliner	Los Angeles	October 26, 1992	175	
Claremont	A westbound train at Claremont station in 2025	San Bernardino Line		Claremont	December 5, 1992	238	
Commerce	The platform at Commerce station	Orange County Line		Commerce	March 28, 1994	33	
Corona–North Main	Corona–North Main station, 2009	Inland Empire–Orange County Line 91/Perris Valley Line		Corona	November 22, 2002	433	
Corona–West	The platform at Corona–West station	Inland Empire–Orange County Line 91/Perris Valley Line		Corona	October 2, 1995	327	
Covina	Covina station from the east end of the platform looking west	San Bernardino Line		Covina	October 26, 1992	342	
Downtown Burbank	The Burbank Downtown station building	Antelope Valley Line Ventura County Line	Amtrak: Pacific Surfliner	Burbank	October 26, 1992	467	
El Monte	The platform at El Monte station	San Bernardino Line		El Monte	October 26, 1992	203	
Fairplex (fair days)		San Bernardino Line		La Verne			
Fontana	Fontana station	San Bernardino Line		Fontana	November 22, 1993	440	
Fullerton	Trackside at Fullerton station	Orange County Line 91/Perris Valley Line	Amtrak: Pacific Surfliner Southwest Chief	Fullerton	March 28, 1994	911	
Glendale	The Glendale station building	Antelope Valley Line Ventura County Line	Amtrak: Pacific Surfliner	Glendale	October 26, 1992	350	
Industry	Industry station from the east end of the platform looking west	Riverside Line		Industry	June 14, 1993	197	
Irvine	A train at Irvine station	Orange County Line Inland Empire–Orange County Line	Amtrak: Pacific Surfliner	Irvine	March 28, 1994	704	
Jurupa Valley/Pedley	The platform at Jurupa Valley/Pedley station, 2017	Riverside Line		Jurupa Valley	June 14, 1993	59	
L.A. Union Station†	The Los Angeles Union Station main building	Antelope Valley Line San Bernardino Line Ventura County Line Riverside Line Orange County Line 91/Perris Valley Line	Amtrak: Pacific Surfliner Coast Starlight Southwest Chief Sunset Limited Texas Eagle Los Angeles Metro: A Line; B Line; D Line	Los Angeles	October 26, 1992	7,861	
Laguna Niguel/Mission Viejo	A train at Laguna Niguel/Mission Viejo station, 2008	Orange County Line Inland Empire–Orange County Line		Laguna Niguel	April 22, 2002	197	
Lancaster†	The Lancaster station building	Antelope Valley Line		Lancaster	January 24, 1994	444	
Montclair	Montclair Transcenter in 2025	San Bernardino Line		Montclair	February 22, 1993	261	
Montebello/Commerce	The platform at Montebello/Commerce station	Riverside Line		Montebello	September 8, 1997	99	
Moorpark	A train at Moorpark station	Ventura County Line	Amtrak: Pacific Surfliner	Moorpark	October 26, 1992	105	
Moreno Valley/March Field	Moreno Valley/March Field station, 2016	91/Perris Valley Line		Moreno Valley	June 6, 2016	119	
Newhall	Exterior of the Newhall station	Antelope Valley Line		Santa Clarita	March 18, 2000	278	
Northridge	The platform at Northridge station	Ventura County Line	Amtrak: Pacific Surfliner	Los Angeles	February 14, 1994	326	
Norwalk/Santa Fe Springs	Norwalk/Santa Fe Springs station in 2016, with a BNSF freight train on the left track	Orange County Line 91/Perris Valley Line		Norwalk	July 17, 1995	543	
Oceanside†	A Metrolink train (center) and a Coaster train (right) at Oceanside station	Orange County Line Inland Empire–Orange County Line	Amtrak: Pacific Surfliner NCTD: Coaster; Sprinter	Oceanside	March 28, 1994	223	
Ontario–East	A train at Ontario–East station	Riverside Line		Ontario	June 14, 1993	156	
Orange	The platform at Orange station	Orange County Line Inland Empire–Orange County Line		Orange	March 28, 1994	432	
Oxnard	Oxnard Transit Center portal	Ventura County Line	Amtrak: Pacific Surfliner Coast Starlight	Oxnard	April 4, 1994	106	
Palmdale	The Palmdale Transportation Center building	Antelope Valley Line		Palmdale	April 25, 2005	388	
Perris–Downtown	A train at Perris–Downtown station	91/Perris Valley Line		Perris	June 6, 2016	133	
Perris–South†	The platform at Perris–South station	91/Perris Valley Line		Perris	June 6, 2016	131	
Pomona–Downtown	The Pomona–Downtown station building	Riverside Line	Amtrak: Sunset Limited Texas Eagle	Pomona	February 5, 2001	86	
Pomona–North	A train at Pomona–North station	San Bernardino Line	Los Angeles Metro: A Line	Pomona	October 26, 1992	278	
Rancho Cucamonga	The platform at Rancho Cucamonga station	San Bernardino Line		Rancho Cucamonga	November 1, 1994	432	
Redlands–Downtown†	Redlands–Downtown station	San Bernardino Line Arrow		Redlands	October 24, 2022	110	
Redlands–Esri	Redlands–Esri station site, under construction in March 2021	Arrow		Redlands	October 24, 2022	28	
Redlands–University†	Redlands–University station, under construction in October 2021	Arrow		Redlands	October 24, 2022	118	
Rialto	The Rialto station building at night	San Bernardino Line		Rialto	May 17, 1993	267	
Riverside–Downtown†	A train at Riverside–Downtown station at night	Riverside Line Inland Empire–Orange County Line 91/Perris Valley Line	Amtrak: Southwest Chief	Riverside	June 14, 1993	654	
Riverside–Hunter Park/UCR	A train at Riverside–Hunter Park/UCR station	91/Perris Valley Line		Riverside	June 6, 2016	88	
Riverside–La Sierra	The entrance to Riverside–La Sierra station	Inland Empire–Orange County Line 91/Perris Valley Line		Riverside	October 2, 1995	433	
San Bernardino–Depot	Trackside at San Bernardino Depot	San Bernardino Line Inland Empire–Orange County Line	Amtrak: Southwest Chief	San Bernardino	May 17, 1993	367	
San Bernardino–Downtown†	A San Bernardino Transit Center sign	San Bernardino Line Inland Empire–Orange County Line Arrow		San Bernardino	December 16, 2017	678	
San Bernardino–Tippecanoe	The platform at San Bernardino–Tippecanoe station	Arrow		San Bernardino	October 24, 2022	25	
San Clemente	The platform at San Clemente station	Orange County Line Inland Empire–Orange County Line		San Clemente	March 6, 1995	40	
San Clemente Pier (Note: Weekend service only.)	The platform at San Clemente Pier station	Orange County Line Inland Empire–Orange County Line	Amtrak: Pacific Surfliner	San Clemente	June 15, 1996	4	
San Juan Capistrano	A trackside view of San Juan Capistrano station	Orange County Line Inland Empire–Orange County Line	Amtrak: Pacific Surfliner	San Juan Capistrano	March 28, 1994	64	
Santa Ana	A view of Santa Ana station	Orange County Line Inland Empire–Orange County Line	Amtrak: Pacific Surfliner	Santa Ana	March 28, 1994	407	
Santa Clarita	The entrance to Santa Clarita station	Antelope Valley Line		Santa Clarita	October 26, 1992	234	
Simi Valley	The platform at Simi Valley station	Ventura County Line	Amtrak: Pacific Surfliner Coast Starlight	Simi Valley	October 26, 1992	163	
Sun Valley	The platform at Sun Valley station	Antelope Valley Line		Los Angeles	April 30, 2001	78	
Sylmar/San Fernando	The open-sheltered platforms of Sylmar/San Fernando station	Antelope Valley Line		Los Angeles	January 26, 1994	377	
Tustin	A streetside view of Tustin station	Orange County Line Inland Empire–Orange County Line		Tustin	January 21, 2002	695	
Upland	The platform at Upland station	San Bernardino Line		Upland	May 17, 1993	287	
Van Nuys	The Van Nuys station building	Ventura County Line	Amtrak: Pacific Surfliner Coast Starlight	Los Angeles	October 26, 1992	129	
Ventura–East†	A train at East Ventura station at sunset	Ventura County Line		Ventura	November 11, 2002	16	
Via Princessa	The platform at Via Princessa station	Antelope Valley Line		Santa Clarita	February 7, 1994	191	
Vincent Grade/Acton	Vincent Grade/Acton station	Antelope Valley Line		Acton	January 31, 1994	93	
Vista Canyon	The platform at Vista Canyon station	Antelope Valley Line		Santa Clarita	October 23, 2023	56	

== Closed stations ==
Station	Line(s)	Location	Notes	References
Auto Club Speedway (race days)	San Bernardino Line	Fontana	Not a regular service stop; instead was only in service for events at the Auto Club Speedway until the racetrack closed in 2023.	

== Future stations ==
Station	Line(s)	Location	Status	Planned opening date	References
Pacoima	Antelope Valley Line (Infill station)	Los Angeles	Planned		
Placentia	91/Perris Valley Line (Infill station)	Placentia	Planned		
L.A. General Medical Center	San Bernardino Line (Infill station)	Los Angeles	Proposed		
Pico Rivera	91/Perris Valley Line, Orange County Line (Infill station)	Pico Rivera	Proposed		
Mead Valley	91/Perris Valley Line (Infill station)	Mead Valley	Planned		
