= Burbank station =

Burbank station may refer to:

- Burbank station (DART), light rail station in Dallas
- Downtown Burbank station, commuter rail station in Burbank, California

== See also ==
- Burbank Airport station (disambiguation)
