= Vista Canyon Multi-Modal Center =

Transit center in Santa Clarita, California

Vista Canyon
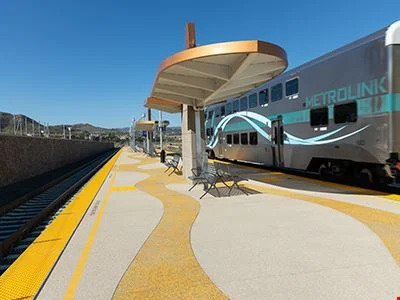
- Vista Canyon station platform

General information
- Location: 27550 1/2 Vista Canyon Boulevard; Santa Clarita, California
- Coordinates: 34°24′47″N 118°26′02″W
- Owner: City of Santa Clarita
- Line: SCRRA Valley Subdivision
- Platforms: 1 island platform
- Tracks: 2
- Bus stands: 8

Construction
- Structure type: Embankment
- Parking: Yes
- Cycle facilities: Racks and 18 lockers
- Accessible: Yes

History
- Opened: October 23, 2023; 2 years ago

Passengers
- FY 2026: 56 (avg. wkdy boardings)

Services
Preceding station	Metrolink	Following station
Vincent Grade/Acton toward Lancaster	Antelope Valley Line	Via Princessa toward L.A. Union Station
Location

The Vista Canyon Multi-Modal Center, also known as the Vista Canyon Regional Transit Center, is a Metrolink commuter rail station and transport hub in the Canyon Country neighborhood of Santa Clarita, California. It is located along Metrolink's Antelope Valley Line.

The station, which opened as infill between the previously existing Vincent Grade/Acton and Via Princessa stations, officially opened on October 23, 2023, following a ribbon-cutting ceremony held on October 20, 2023. An adjacent surface parking lot with 120 parking spaces opened in March 2024.

Vista Canyon Multi-Modal Center is served by 22 Metrolink Antelope Valley Line trains (11 in each direction) each weekday. Weekend service consists of 12 trains (6 in each direction) on both Saturday and Sunday. On all days, trains are evenly spaced throughout the day.

== Overview ==
Built as part of the adjacent Canyon Valley transit-oriented development, the development features a Metrolink commuter rail infill station along the Antelope Valley Line, a bus transfer facility, and a 613-space parking garage. The hub is partly funded by a special tax district of adjacent properties, and by grants from Caltrans. The contract awarded for construction of the train station was valued at $23.7 million.

== History ==
Initial planning for the transit center began in April 2010 and was completed in November 2012. NEPA environmental approval was obtained in June 2014. Pre-construction of the transit center began in September 2016, with construction expected to begin in November.

On October 22, 2019, the Santa Clarita City Council unanimously approved a $1 million construction management contract with RailPros to build out the Metrolink station at Vista Canyon.

Construction of the train station led by Icon West, Inc. began in December 2020. A groundbreaking for the rail station was held the same day as the opening of the parking facility: October 27, 2020. At that time, the station was expected to open in 2022.

== Gallery ==
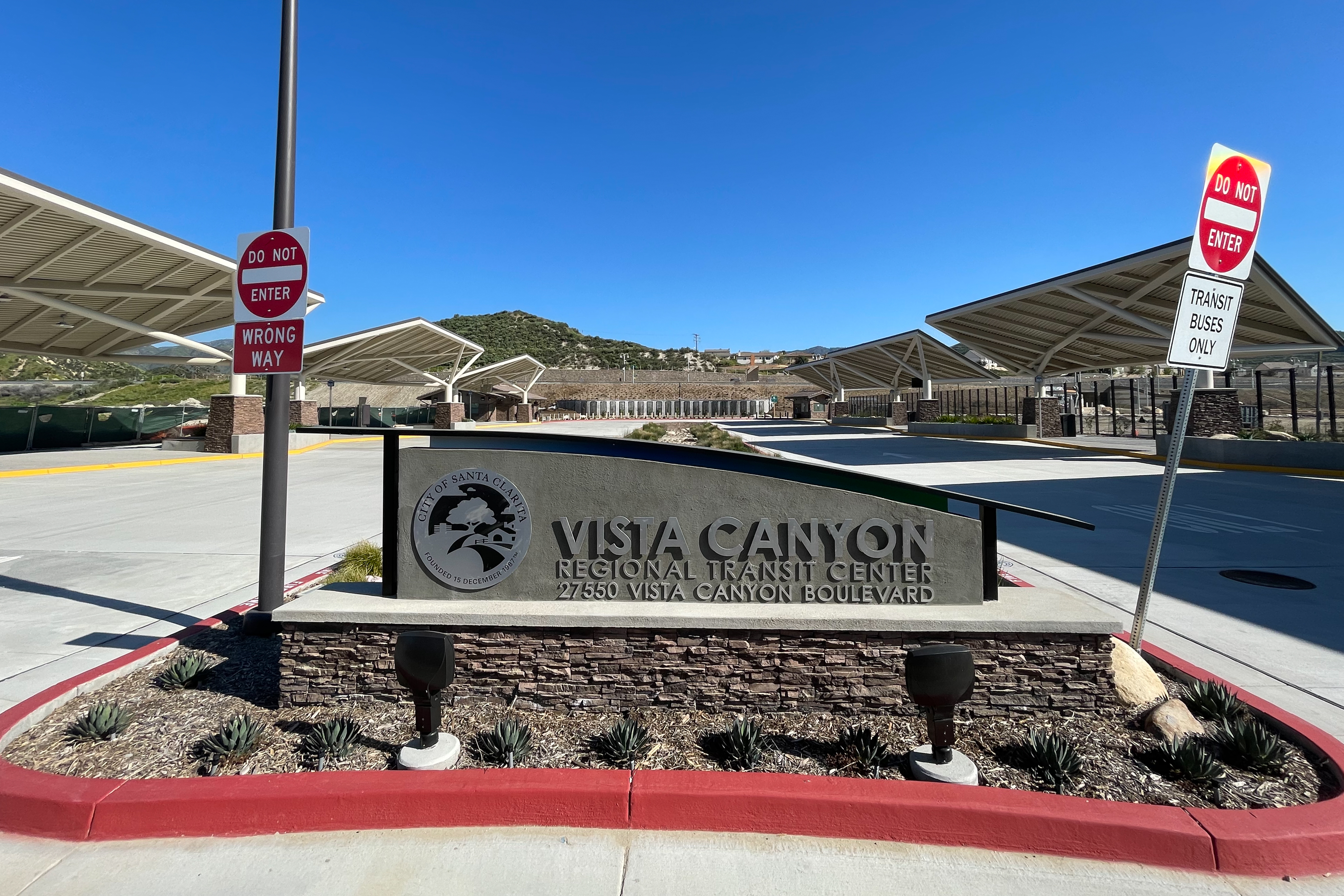
Bus station nearing completion in April 2023

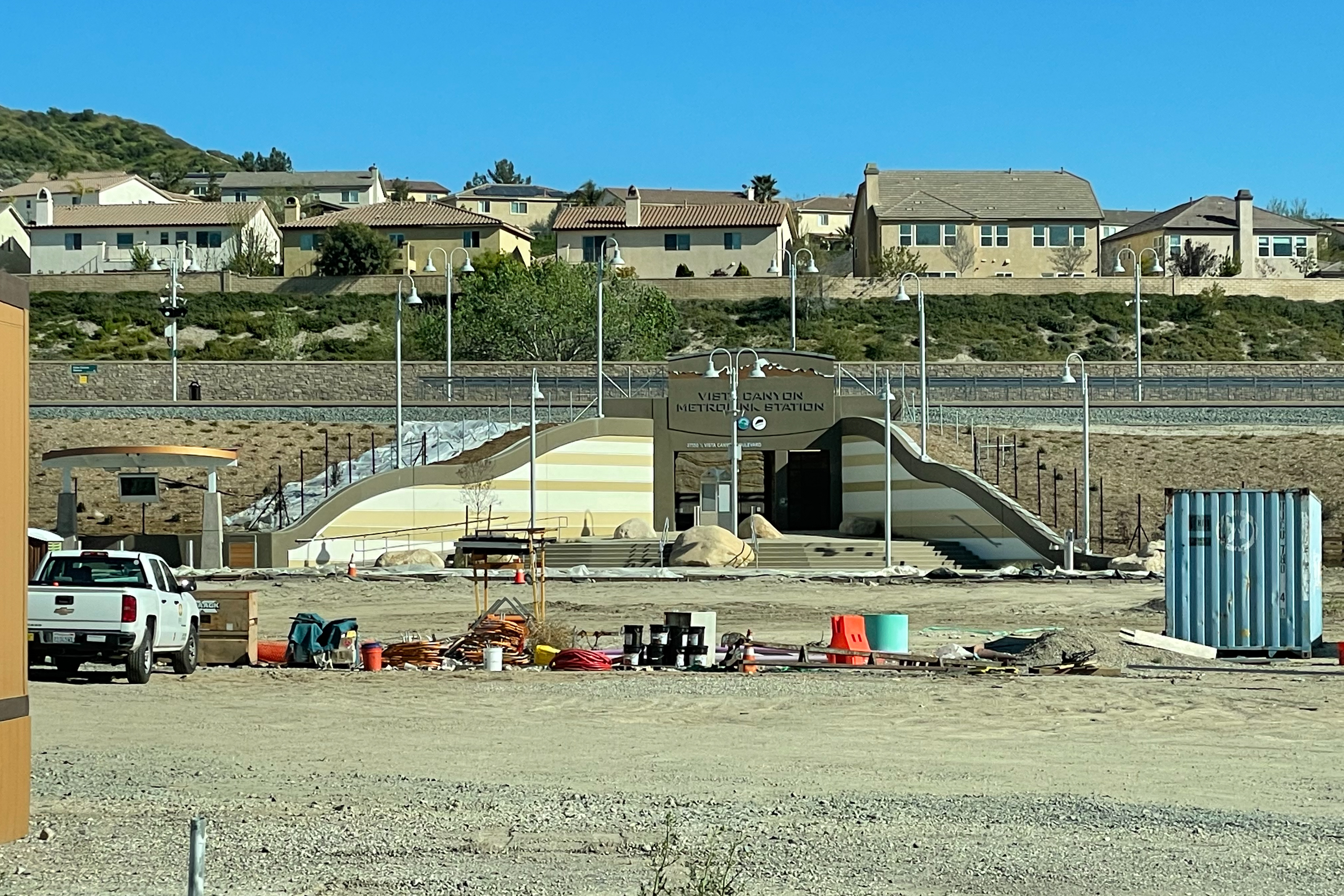
Train station nearing completion in April 2023

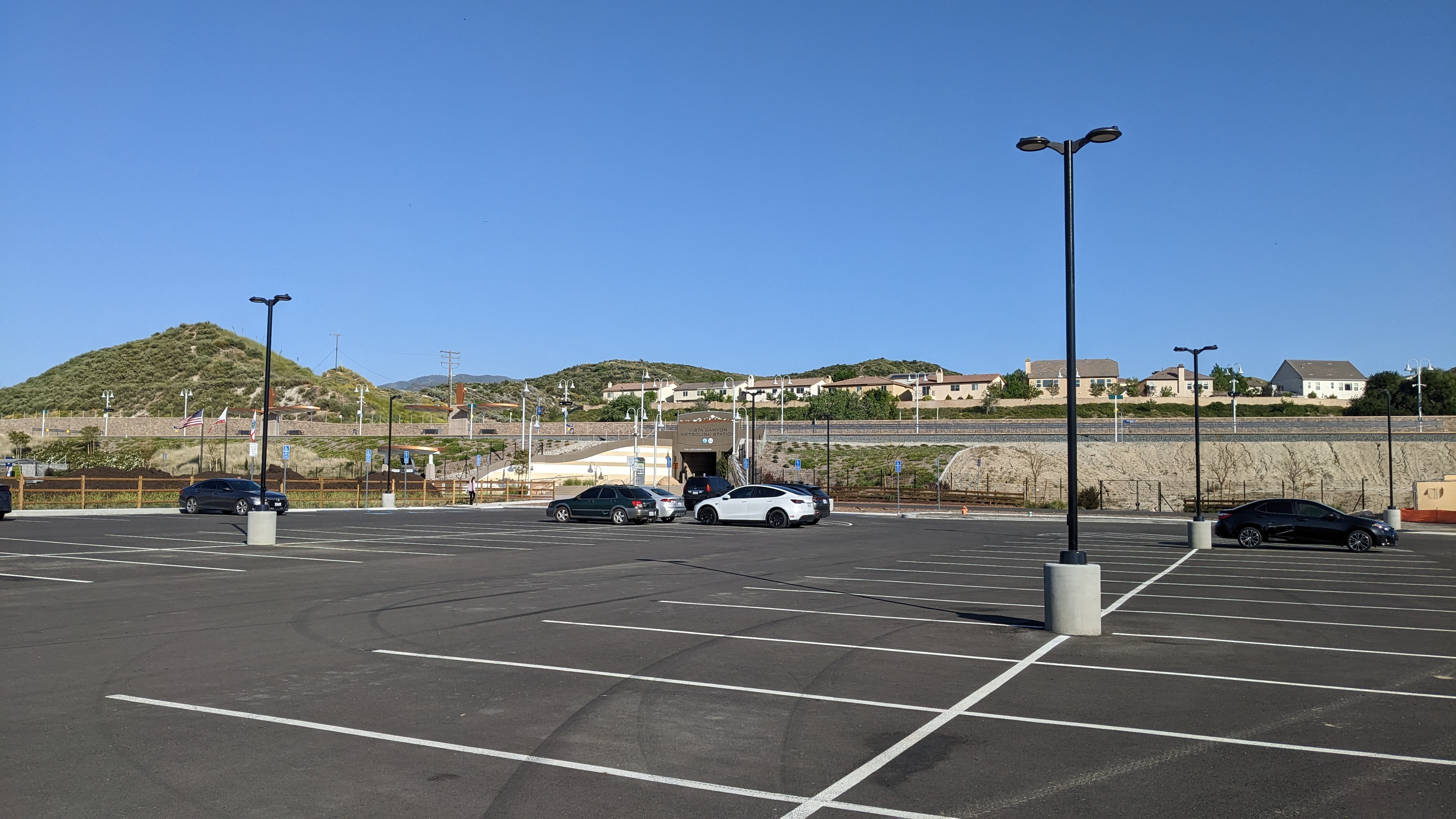
Vista Canyon Metrolink Station and adjacent parking lot in May 2024

== See also ==
- McBean Regional Transit Center
