= Short turn =

Transit early terminus

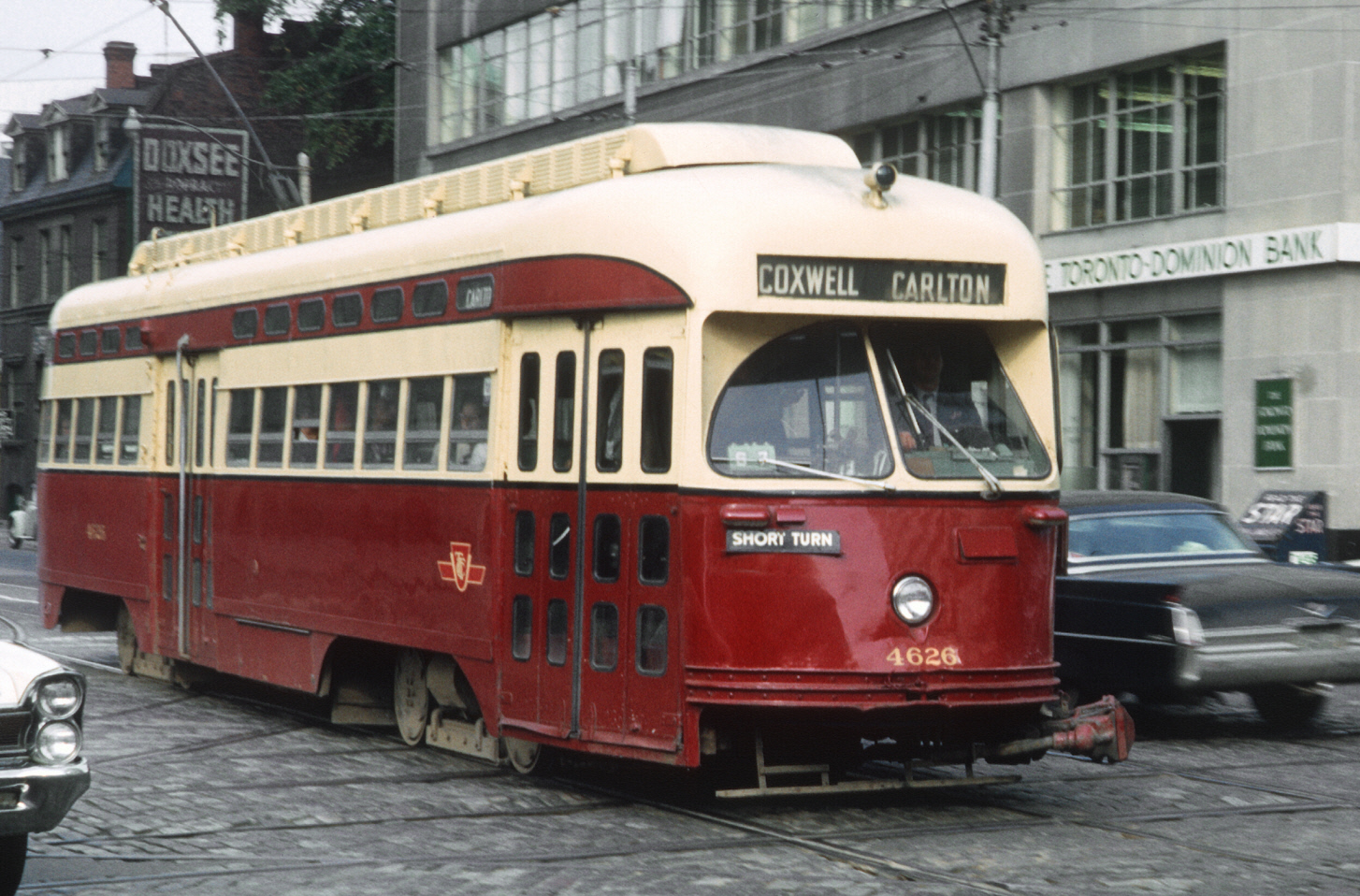
Short turn services are common on the Toronto streetcar network. Pictured is a Carlton streetcar on a short turn service, terminating at Queen-Coxwell Loop in 1965.

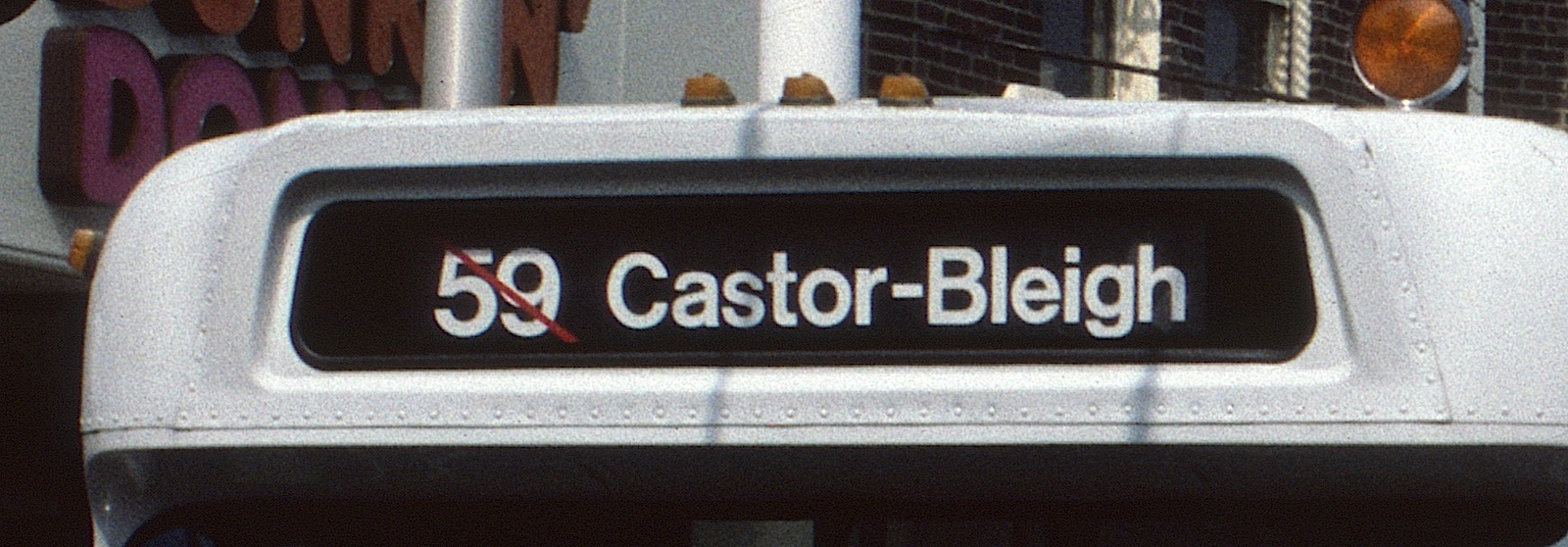
During the era when destination signs were non-electronic types, some transit systems denoted short-turn trips by a slash through the route number.

In public transport, a short turn, short working or turn-back is a service on a bus route or rail line that does not operate along the full length of the route. Short turn trips are often scheduled and published in a timetable, but they may also be unscheduled. Public transport operators use short turns for a variety of reasons, including delays, infrastructure limitations, and uneven passenger demand.

Short turn services often require additional infrastructure to turn vehicles around in the middle of a route. Short turn bus services may not require any infrastructure, using streets to turn around. In comparison, short turn tram or streetcar services may have to use a balloon loop, limiting the locations for short turns. Rail services such as rapid transit and commuter rail have similar limits with short turn locations: they need crossovers, loops, or other special tracks when they short turn.

== Purposes ==
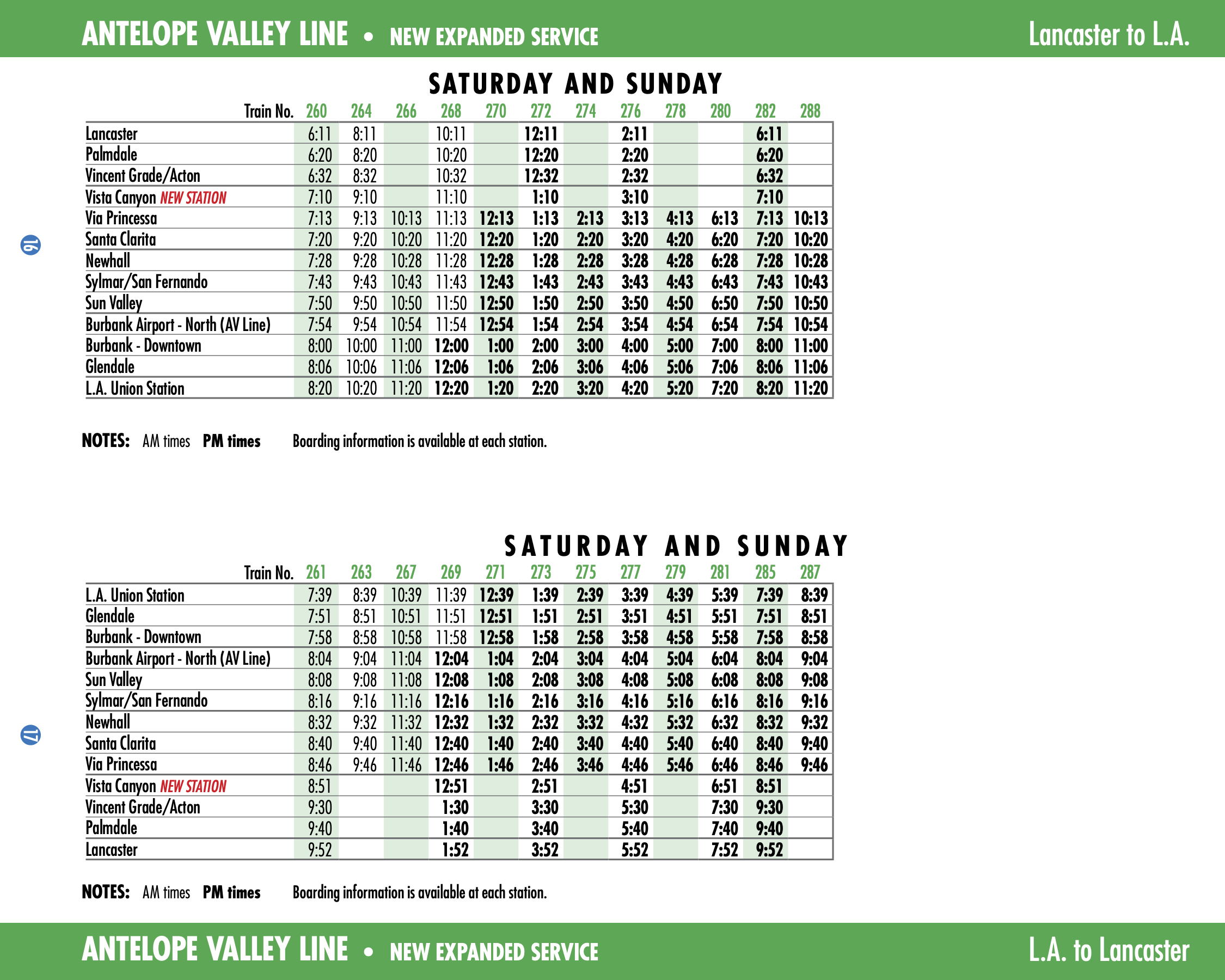
Short turn services in a timetable: some Metrolink Antelope Valley Line trains short turn at Via Princessa station

=== Demand for services ===
Short turns are used on bus routes and rail lines where there is a lower demand for service along the part of the route not served by the short-turning trips. This helps in reducing operating costs. While more economical, these short turns do not necessarily reduce the number of buses needed to operate the full amount of service along the route.

An alternative to this are services that split up into multiple branches. This provides a frequent service on the main route while the individual branches are served less frequently.

=== Crowd management ===
Short turns can aid in reducing overcrowding of buses. By scheduling uneven intervals between full-length and short turn trips, this may lead to accommodation of more riders on the trips coming out of the short turn layover location.

=== Unscheduled short turns ===
Unscheduled short turns occur when services are delayed or disrupted. When bunching occurs, some of the bunched vehicles may be short-turned to provide additional service in the other direction. This practice can allow a vehicle to regain time in its schedule, and it benefits passengers waiting at stops in the opposite direction. Unscheduled short turns are a useful tool for managers of transport services, but must be used in combination with other methods to properly manage delays and bunching.

However, unscheduled short turns are inconvenient for passengers on the vehicle being short-turned, who must disembark before their destination. Passengers and the media are often critical of unscheduled short turns, as seen in Toronto, where a review of Toronto Transit Commission bus and streetcar services found that the TTC short-turned over 333,000 trips between January 2012 and September 2014.

== History ==
An early English-language description of short turn services is in A New English Dictionary On Historical Principles, in its definition of "short running." The dictionary quotes an 1855 document describing stagecoach services in Cornwall, which were successful at that time: "The people patronized the vans to such an extent that short-running coaches were few."

== Short turns by mode of transport ==
=== Buses ===
==== Trolleybuses ====
Short turn services pose a unique challenge for trolleybuses, electric buses that draw power from an overhead line. Conventional trolleybuses must be connected to the overhead lines at all times, and short turn services can only be operated where overhead lines are installed. Some more advanced trolleybuses are equipped with batteries or engines for limited operation away from their overhead lines, which allows for short turns at more locations. Battery technology continues to improve, and increasing numbers of trolleybuses are equipped to operate "off-wire," enabling flexibility for short turns and other service changes. In 1983, battery-equipped trolleybuses were capable of traveling 3.2 km (2 mi) off-wire; in comparison, by 2023, trolleybuses are routinely equipped with batteries that will power the bus for distances of over 16 mi (25 km).

==== Battery-electric buses ====
Battery-electric buses can operate short turn services with minimal infrastructure. Battery-electric buses must be recharged periodically, and many operators of battery-electric buses place chargers at terminals, which may not be served by short turn services. This issue was studied in a 2024 paper by scholars from Xi'an University of Posts and Telecommunications and Beijing Jiaotong University, who highlighted that the high costs of deadheading buses to and from chargers can outweigh the otherwise large benefits of operating short turn services.

=== Bus rapid transit ===
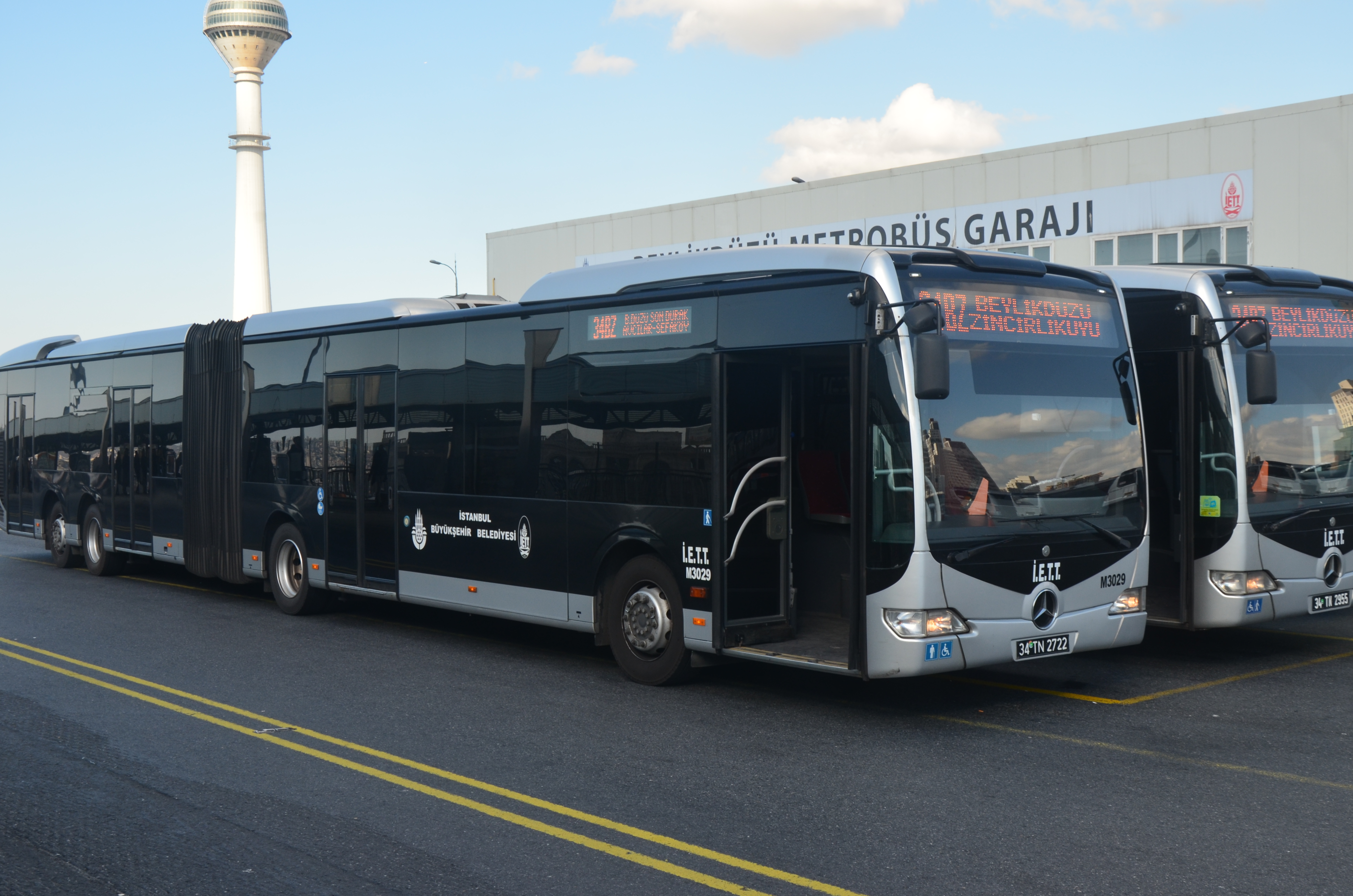
Buses of line 34BZ, a short turn service on the Metrobüs system in Istanbul, at a depot

Bus rapid transit services operate on dedicated infrastructure, away from public roads. This means that to operate short turn services, turnaround points must be provided. On some bus rapid transit services, such as the Metrobüs in Istanbul, short turn services are the majority of services. Full-length services over the whole 52-kilometre (32 mi) line do operate, but short turn services provide an essential part of the Metrobüs service. Metrobüs is one of the busiest bus rapid transit services in the world, with buses arriving as often as every 15 seconds.

=== Streetcars and trams ===
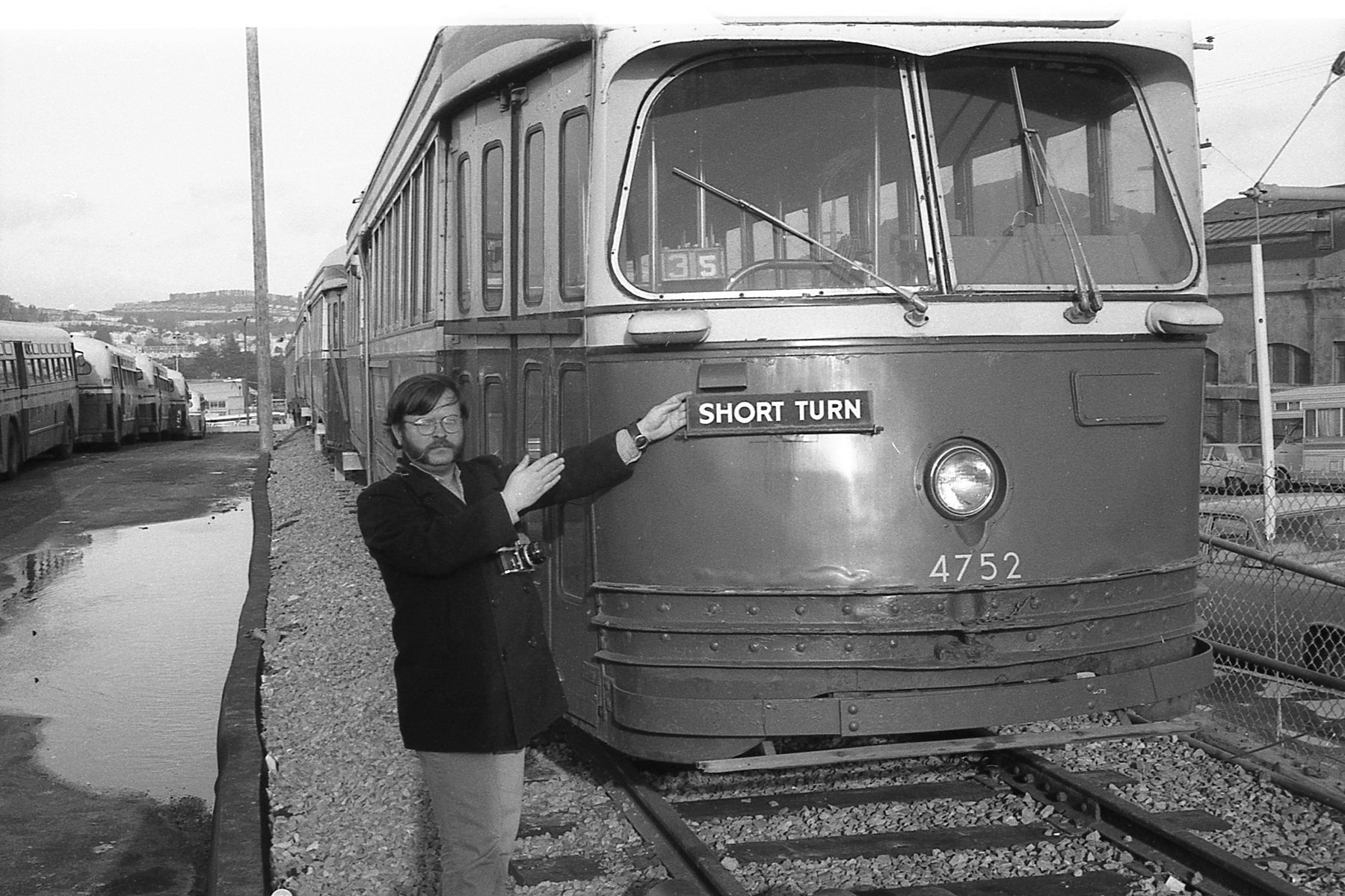
A railfan points to a "Short Turn" sign on an ex-TTC streetcar in storage in San Francisco, 1974

Streetcars (trams) require on-street or off-street infrastructure to operate short turn services. On streetcar systems that operate single-ended cars, such as the Toronto streetcar system, short turn services require a loop of track, either via city streets or as an off-street balloon loop. In Toronto, short turn streetcars are common, both scheduled and unscheduled.

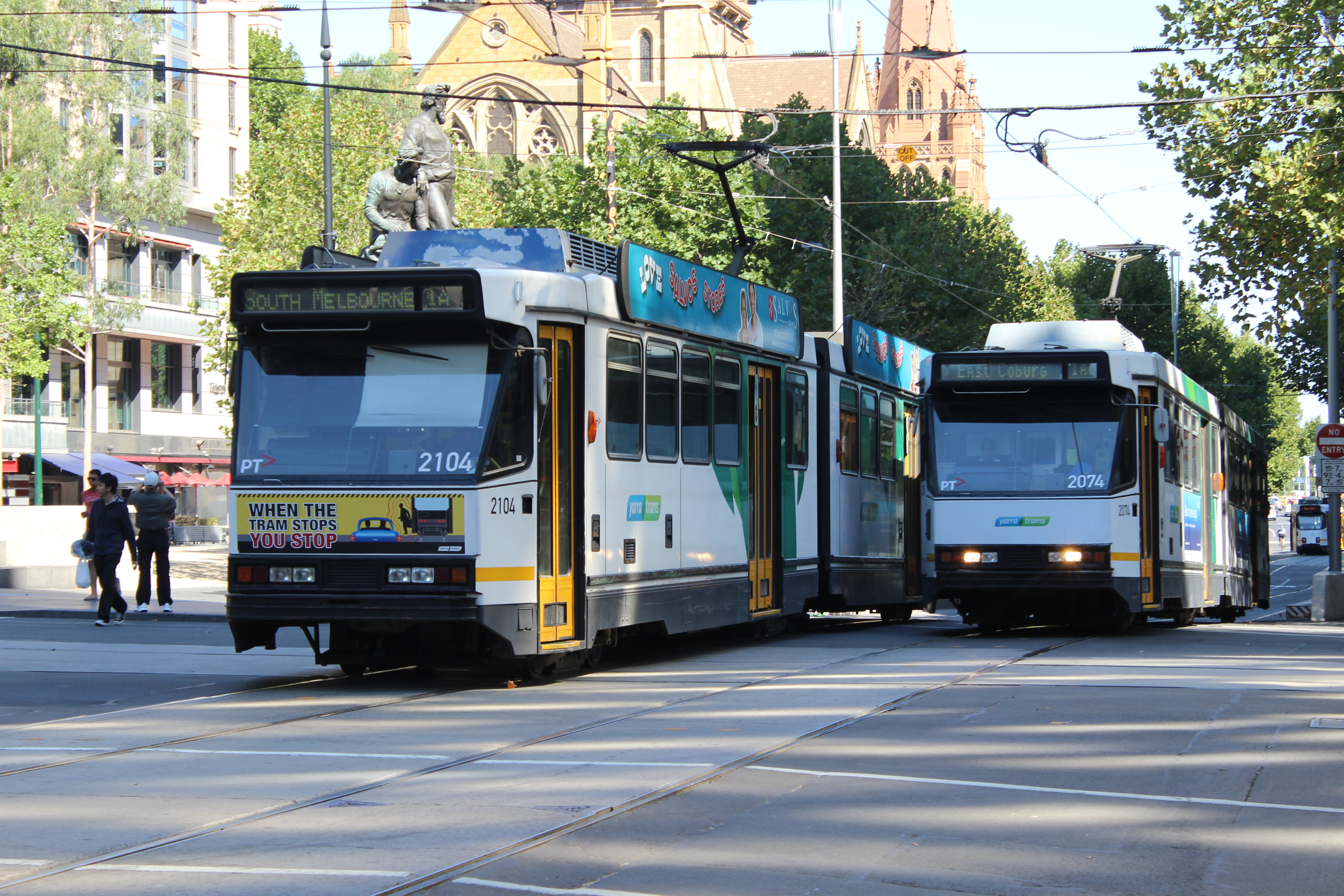
Two route 1a trams, a short working of route 1, on Swanston Street in Melbourne

Short turn services on the tram system in Melbourne, the world's largest, are officially known as "short workings," but are sometimes nicknamed "ghost trams" due to their confusing nature. From 1970 to 2012, short workings were identified by different numbers than their full routes, often using numbers that were unrelated to the original. For example, route 31 was a short working of route 48, and short workings of route 1 were variously signed as routes 2, 2A, 4, and 21. After the system was privatized in 1999, many short workings were no longer published in timetables, leading to further confusion. A reorganization of tram routes in 2012 introduced a new nomenclature for short workings, which uses the suffix "d" to indicate trams terminating at their depot, and "a" to indicate other short workings.

=== Rapid transit (subway, metro) ===
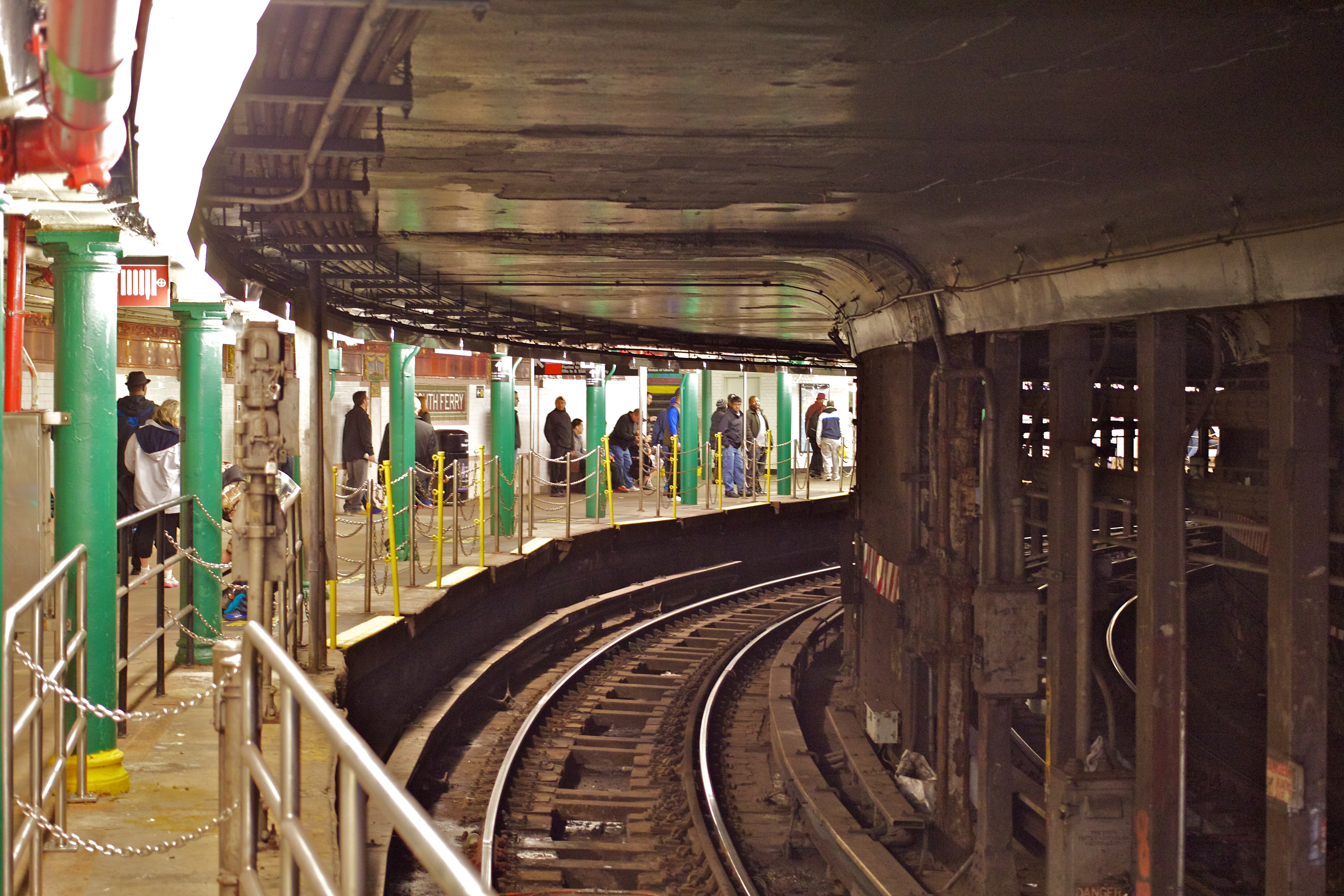
Short-turning 5 trains on the New York City Subway use the inner track of the Old South Ferry loop, which closed to passengers in 1977

Some rapid transit (subway or metro) systems rely heavily on short turn services. An example of this is the New York City Subway, which uses short turn services in multiple locations across the system. Some short turn services are operated due to passenger demand, such as 5 trains on weekends, which originate at their normal northern terminal of Eastchester and terminate at Bowling Green. Short-turn 5 trains continue south from Bowling Green and turn around in the inner track of the Old South Ferry loop, which has been closed to passengers since 1977. Short turn services are also operated during peak times, as some terminal stations cannot turn around enough trains to operate full rush-hour service. This is seen with some F trains, which short turn at Kings Highway instead of running their full route to the line's southern terminus of Coney Island.

=== Commuter rail ===
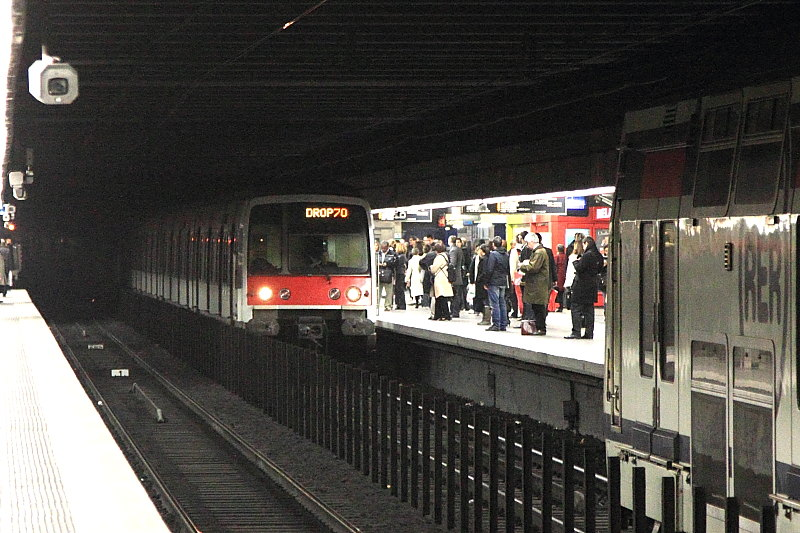
This RER A train at Auber will short turn at Noisy-le-Grand – Mont d'Est, according to its "DROP" mission code

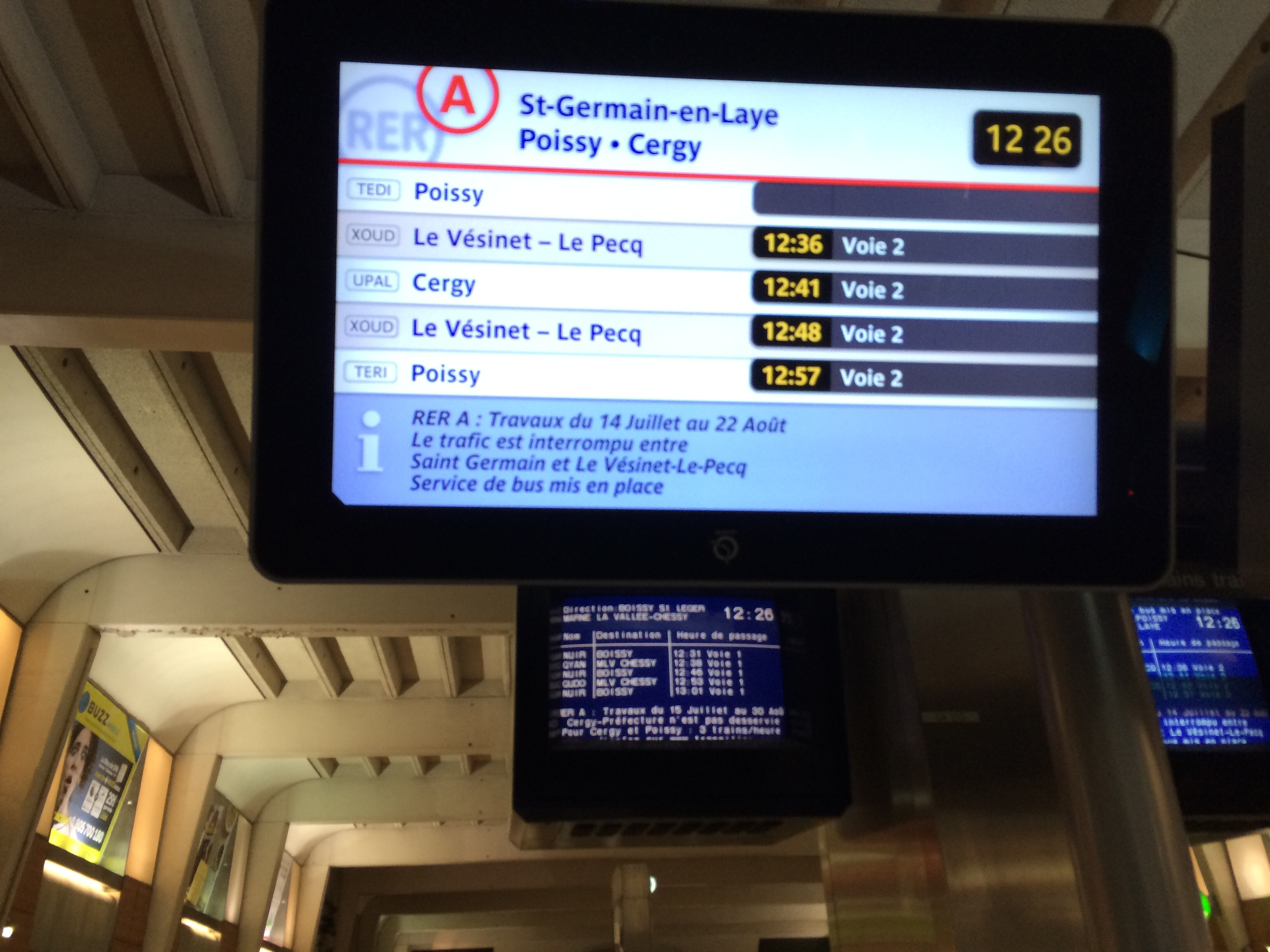
During track work on the A1 branch of the RER A, trains to Saint-Germain-en-Laye had to short turn at Le Vésinet–Le Pecq, with the corresponding "XOUD" mission code

Short turn services are operated on some commuter rail and regional rail systems. A particularly complex example of short turn commuter rail services is seen on the Réseau Express Régional (RER) in the Paris Region of France, whose five lines each feature a high-capacity tunnel through the city centre of Paris and a number of branches in the suburbs. To handle overcrowding in the city centre, the RER operates many short turn services. The complex system of short turn services is communicated with a system of six-character "mission codes," which indicate a train's destination and stopping pattern. When RER services are changed for disruptions, maintenance works, or special events, the mission codes are updated to indicate trains' new destinations.

For example, the pictured RER A train displays a mission code beginning with "DROP." The first character, D, indicates that it is destined for Noisy-le-Grand – Mont d'Est, one of two designated short turn termini on the line's A4 branch to Marne-la-Vallée–Chessy. The pictured information display shows planned maintenance work on the A1 branch to Saint-Germain-en-Laye, which requires trains to short turn at Le Vésinet–Le Pecq, indicated by the mission code "XOUD."

=== Monorail ===
External videos
- Zoo/Stadion station turntable in operation, 1991

The Wuppertal Schwebebahn, a suspended monorail line in Wuppertal, North Rhine-Westphalia, Germany, was formerly capable of operating short turn services. Kluse station featured a turning loop that was destroyed during World War II, and Zoo/Stadion station has featured a loop and a turntable at different points in its history. The Zoo/Stadion turntable operated from 1974 until 2002, when it was shut down due to its regular oil leaks. Following the closure of the Zoo/Stadion turntable, all services operate along the full 13.3 km (8.3 mi) line from Oberbarmen to Vohwinkel.

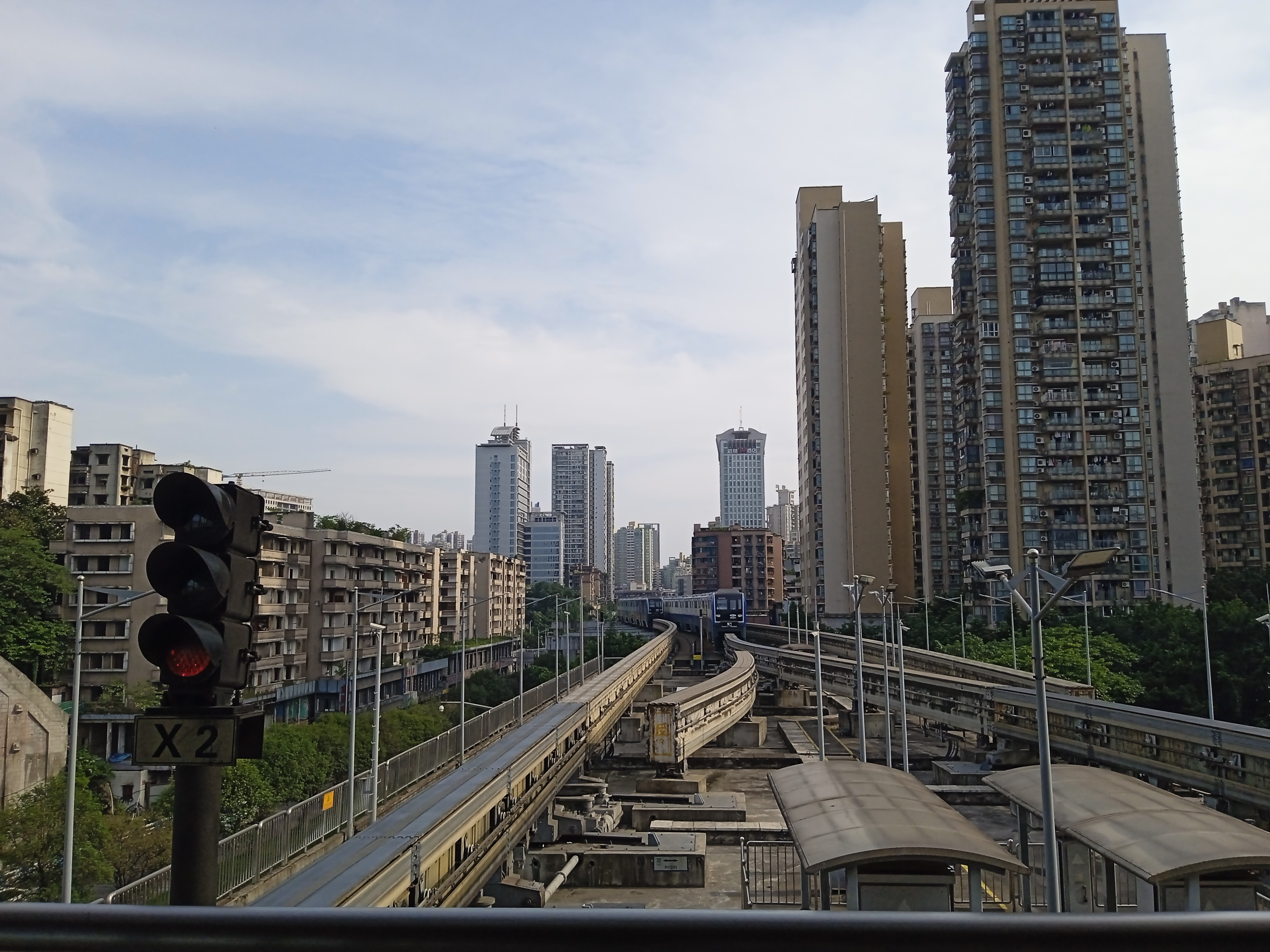
Short turn monorail services require large, complex switches. Pictured is the monorail switch at Sigongli station on Line 3 of Chongqing Rail Transit

Line 3 of Chongqing Rail Transit, the world's busiest monorail line, is equipped for short turns at multiple locations. This infrastructure is a rarity for monorail systems, due to the size, complexity, and cost of switches. The main line of Line 3 is 53.1 km (30 mi) long with 39 stations, 8 of which are equipped to turn trains around. This infrastructure enables the operation of multiple short turn service patterns on Line 3.

The operations of Line 3 were studied in a 2021 paper by scholars from Southwest Jiaotong University and Hong Kong Polytechnic University, who proposed a mathematical model for optimizing short turn train services. The authors of the study argued that operating costs on Line 3 could be reduced by 4% with the mathematically optimized short turn routes generated by their model, while maintaining a similar or better experience for passengers.

== In popular culture ==
Short Turn, a streetcar-themed restaurant on Queen Street in Toronto, is inspired by the Toronto streetcar system's large number of unscheduled short turns. The restaurant features fixtures from retired Toronto streetcars and destination sign-inspired exterior signage.
