= Metrolink stations =

Metrolink stations may refer to:

- List of Metrolink (California) stations
- List of MetroLink (St. Louis) stations
- List of Manchester Metrolink tram stops
