= Eastern Sierra Transit =

Bus transportation provider in the Eastern Sierra Region of California

- Parent: Eastern Sierra Transit Authority
- Founded: November 2006
- Locale: Inyo County, California, Mono County, California
- Service area: Eastern Sierra Region
- Service type: bus service
- Routes: 7 inter-city, 2 local, 1 seasonal shuttle
- Fleet: 63
- Annual ridership: 772,942 (2022)
- Fuel type: Diesel
- Website: ESTA

Eastern Sierra Transit is the operator of public transportation for the Eastern Sierra Region in California (between the Sierra Nevada and the California state line). The agency operates both inter-city and local services. They also offer Dial-a-ride service to disabled passengers in all service areas and to the general public in areas where there is no scheduled fixed-route service. The Eastern Sierra Transit Authority was established in 2006 and took over the operations of Inyo Mono Transit in 2007.

== History ==
In April 2024, Eastern Sierra Transit started the transition of its bus fleet to hydrogen fuel cell vehicles.

== Bus routes ==
Due to its rural and seasonal nature, Eastern Sierra Transit is split into intercity and community routes. Mammoth Lakes operates multiple routes that are seasonally adjusted.

=== Intercity ===
Intercity routes are known as Route 395 routes because they operate on U.S. Route 395. These routes travel from Lancaster to Reno, Nevada.

- Lone Pine to Reno - Route (395 NORTH)
- Mammoth Lakes to Lancaster - Route (395 SOUTH)
- Lone Pine Express - From Lone Pine to Bishop
- Mammoth Express - From Bishop Airport to Mammoth Lakes

=== Community routes ===
Community routes run with a lower frequency and act as a lifeline service.

- Walker to Mammoth Lakes
- Bridgeport to Carson City
- Benton to Bishop
- Tecopa to Pahrump - This route is currently suspended due to the lack of drivers.
