= Sylmar/San Fernando station =

Metrolink stop in the northeast San Fernando Valley

Sylmar/San Fernando
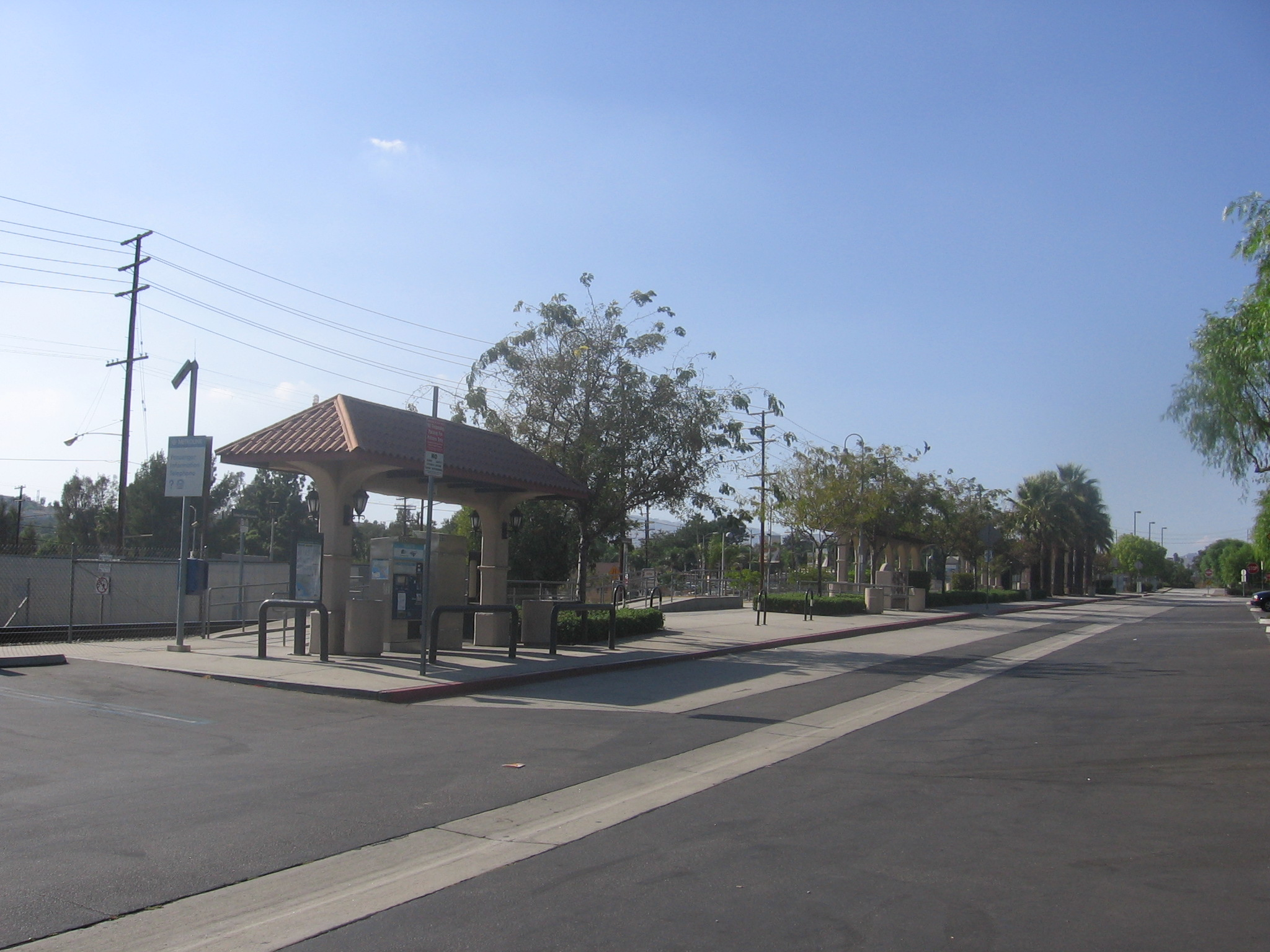
- Open-sheltered platforms of Sylmar/San Fernando Metrolink station.

General information
- Location: 12219 Frank Modugno Drive; Los Angeles, California
- Coordinates: 34°17′32″N 118°27′00″W
- Owner: City of Los Angeles
- Line: SCRRA Valley Subdivision
- Platforms: 1 side platform
- Tracks: 1
- Connections: Los Angeles Metro Bus: 92, 224, 230, 234, 236, 294, Rapid 761; LADOT Commuter Express: 574; LADOT DASH: Sylmar

Construction
- Parking: 375 spaces, 9 accessible spaces
- Cycle facilities: Racks and lockers
- Accessible: Yes

History
- Opened: January 26, 1994

Passengers
- FY 2026: 377 (avg. wkdy boardings)

Services
Preceding station	Metrolink	Following station
Newhall toward Lancaster	Antelope Valley Line	Sun Valley toward L.A. Union Station
Location

Sylmar/San Fernando station is a Metrolink commuter rail train station located in Sylmar, California, (a neighborhood of Los Angeles in the San Fernando Valley) and adjacent to the city of San Fernando. It is served by Metrolink's Antelope Valley Line between Los Angeles Union Station and Lancaster.

Sylmar/San Fernando station is served by 30 Metrolink Antelope Valley Line trains (15 in each direction) each weekday. Weekend service consists of 24 trains (12 in each direction) on both Saturday and Sunday. On all days, trains are evenly spaced throughout the day.

== History ==
The station site was purchased for $1.9 million in March 1992 (equivalent to $4.36 million in 2025). It was previously a farm, with a housing development planned on the parcel. The station was quickly constructed following the 1994 Northridge earthquake, with it opening on January 26 of that year (just nine days after the disaster).

== Connections ==
- Los Angeles Metro Bus: 92, 224, 230, 234, 235, 236, 294, Rapid 761
- LADOT Commuter Express: 574 to LAX and El Segundo
- LADOT DASH: Sylmar
