= Downtown Burbank station =

Railway station in Burbank, California

Downtown Burbank
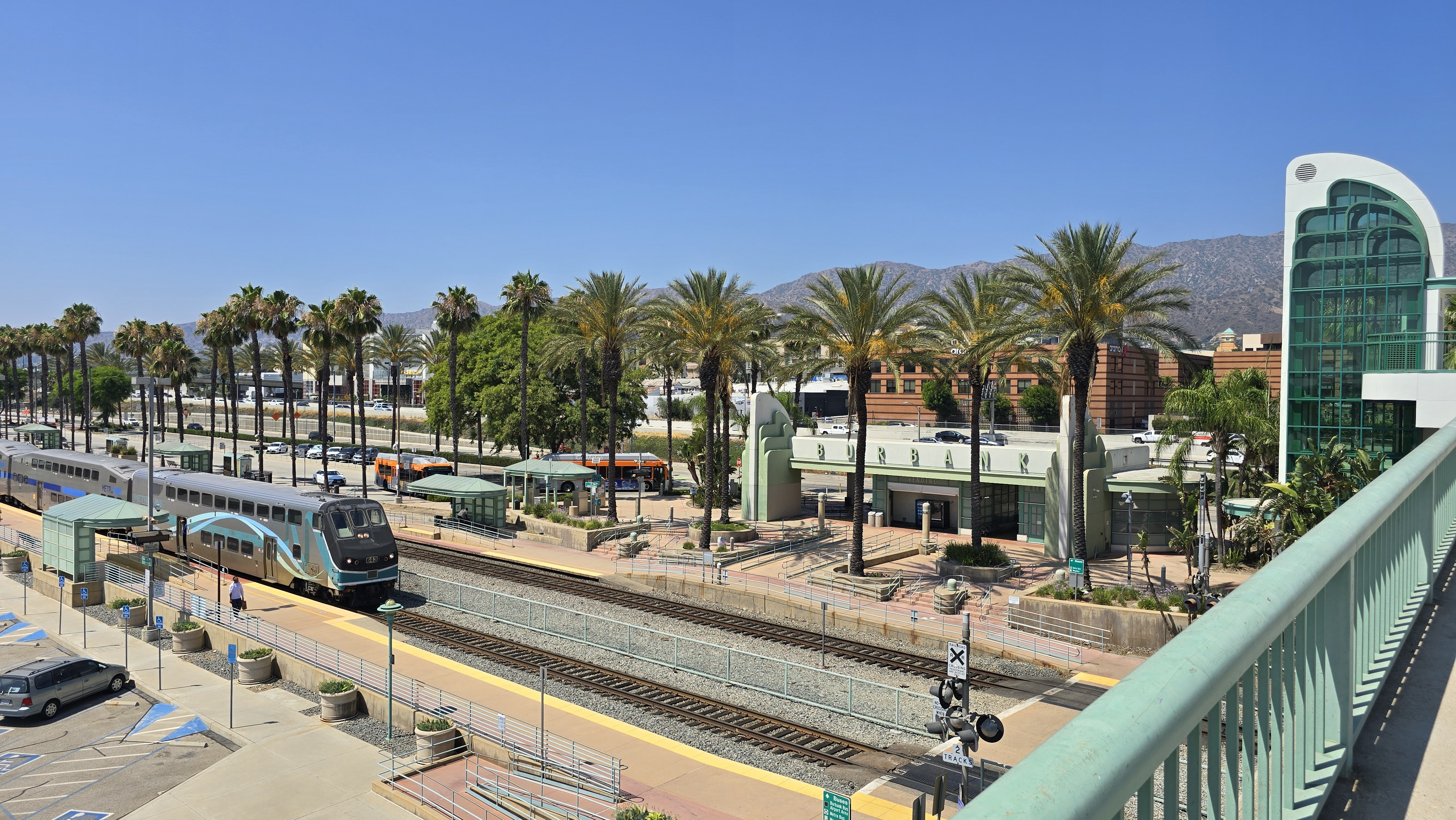
- A Metrolink train on the Antelope Valley Line pulls into Downtown Burbank station, orange Los Angeles Metro Local Busses are in the background, July 2025

General information
- Location: 201 North Front Street; Burbank, California
- Coordinates: 34.178595°N 118.312044°W
- Owner: City of Burbank
- Line: SCRRA Valley Subdivision
- Platforms: 2 side platforms
- Tracks: 2
- Connections: Burbank Bus: Pink; City of Santa Clarita Transit: 794; Glendale Beeline: 12; Los Angeles Metro Bus: 92, 96, 154, 155, 164, 165, 294, Metro Micro North Hollywood/Burbank

Construction
- Parking: 458 spaces, 12 accessible spaces
- Cycle facilities: Secured area
- Accessible: Yes

Other information
- Station code: Amtrak: BBK

History
- Opened: October 26, 1992

Passengers
- FY 2025: 10,852 annually (Amtrak)
- FY 2026: 467 weekday boardings (Metrolink)

Services
Preceding station	Amtrak	Following station
Hollywood Burbank Airport toward San Luis Obispo	Pacific Surfliner (limited service)	Glendale toward San Diego
Coast Starlight does not stop here
Preceding station	Metrolink	Following station
Burbank Airport–North toward Lancaster	Antelope Valley Line	Glendale toward L.A. Union Station
Burbank Airport–South toward Ventura–East	Ventura County Line	Glendale toward L.A. Union Station
Former services
Preceding station	Southern Pacific Railroad	Following station
Roscoe toward Oakland Pier	San Joaquin Valley Line	Glendale toward Los Angeles
Van Nuys toward San Francisco	Coast Line	Glendale toward Los Angeles
Macneil toward Chatsworth	Burbank Branch	Terminus
Location

Downtown Burbank station is a passenger rail station near downtown Burbank, California. It is served by Metrolink's Antelope Valley Line to Lancaster and Ventura County Line to East Ventura with both terminating at Los Angeles Union Station.

Downtown Burbank station is served by 22 Metrolink Ventura County Line trains (11 in each direction) each weekday, running primarily at peak hours in the peak direction of travel. On weekends, 4 Metrolink Ventura County Line trains (2 in each direction) serve the station. Metrolink passengers also have access to 4 Pacific Surfliner trains (2 in each direction) each day through a codesharing arrangement with Amtrak.

== History ==
The Southern Pacific built their line north of Los Angeles to Burbank by mid-1873. The company rebuilt the station in 1927. That building was destroyed in a fire in 1991.

The modern station opened on October 26, 1992, with the inauguration of Metrolink services.

In 2020, the Burbank City Council approved an extension of the Chandler Boulevard Bike Path to the station along a route that will include the under-construction Burbank Channel Bikeway and a connection to the San Fernando Bikeway.

The North Hollywood to Pasadena Bus Rapid Transit Project, a bus rapid transit line, currently under construction and scheduled to open in 2027, will stop at Olive/Lake, nearby, but not at, the station, due to safety concerns regarding the existing Olive Avenue bridge.
