= Burbank Airport station =

Burbank Airport station may refer to:

- Burbank Airport station (California High-Speed Rail), a proposed underground train station on the California High Speed Rail line
- Burbank Airport–North station, a train station serving the Metrolink Antelope Valley Line
- Burbank Airport–South station, a train station serving Amtrak and the Metrolink Ventura County Line
