= Lang Southern Pacific Station =

Historic site in Los Angeles County, California

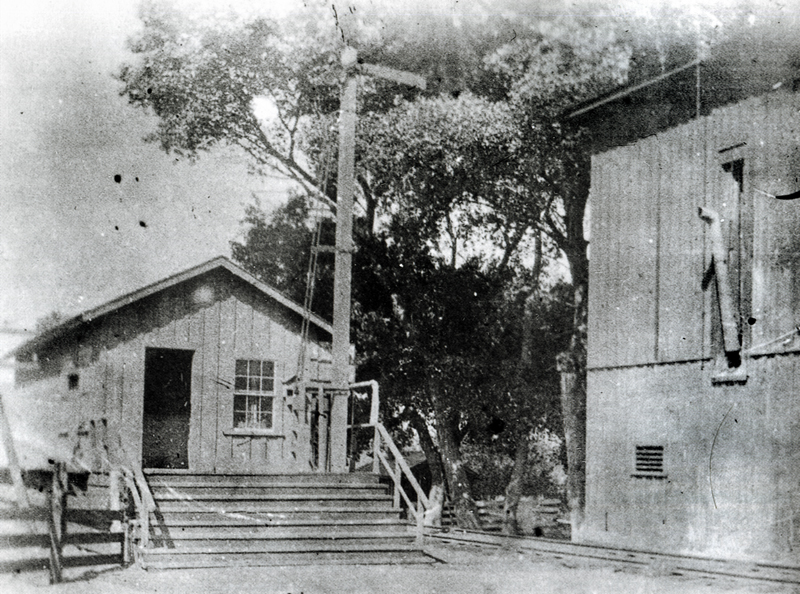
- Lang Southern Pacific Station in 1906, the second depot

- Location within Santa Clarita
- 34.4310°N 118.3791°W
- Location: Near Santa Clarita, California

History
- Built: 1876

California Historical Landmark
- Designated: May 22, 1957
- Reference no.: 590

Lang Station
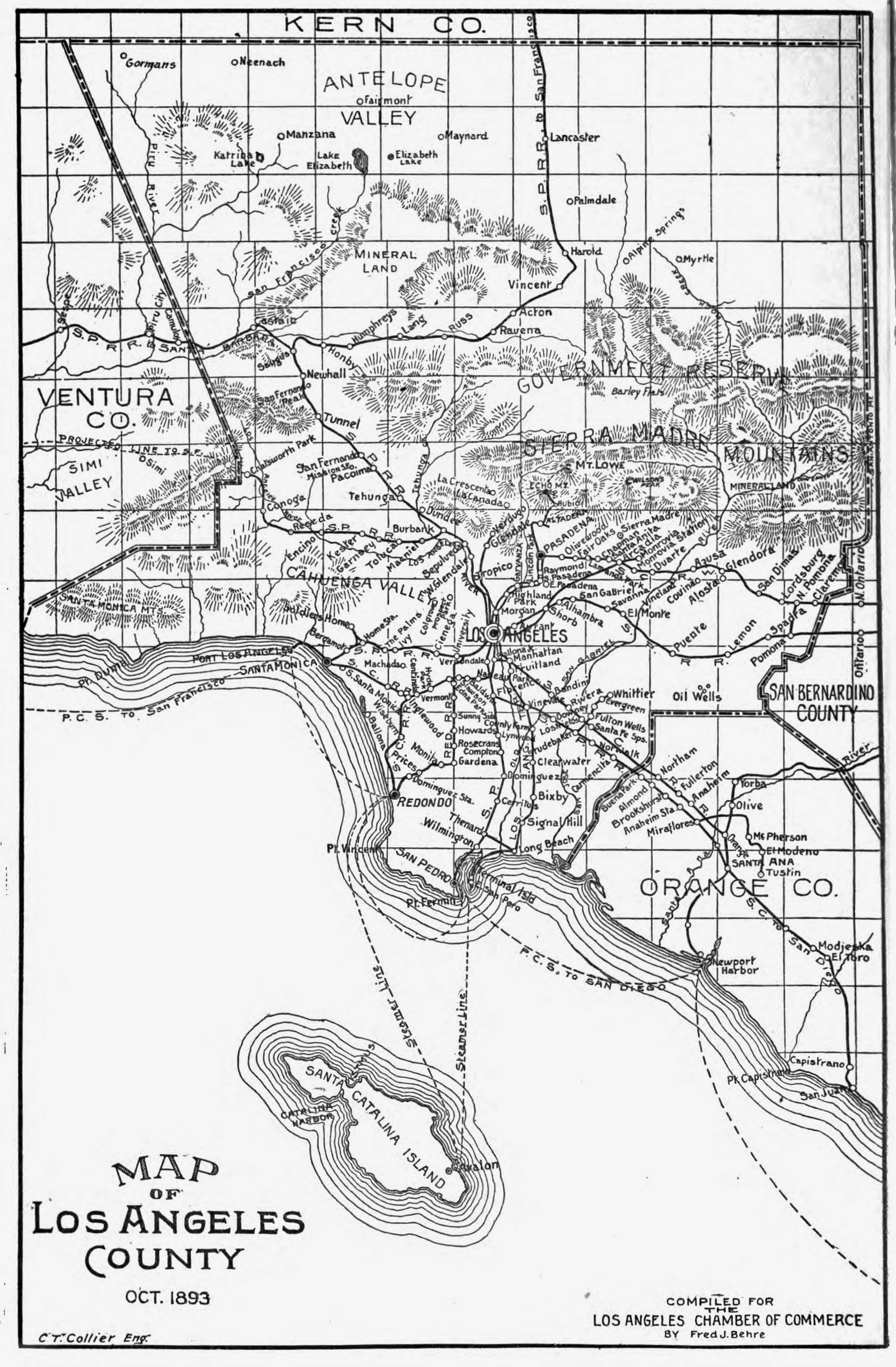
- Lang on a map of Los Angeles County published October 1893 for the World's Columbian Exposition

General information
- Location: Lang's Springs
- Owner: Southern Pacific Railroad

History
- Opened: 1876; 150 years ago
- Closed: 1969; 57 years ago

Services
| Preceding station | Southern Pacific Railroad | Following station |
|---|---|---|
| Russ toward Oakland Pier | San Joaquin Valley Line | Humphreys toward Los Angeles |
Location

Lang Southern Pacific Station is a former Southern Pacific railway station located in Soledad Canyon near the eastern end of Santa Clarita, California. On September 5, 1876, the first railway to Los Angeles was completed at this site. The Lang Southern Pacific Station was designated a California Historic Landmark (No. 590) on May 22, 1957.

== History ==
On September 5, 1876, Charles Crocker, President of the Southern Pacific Company, hammered a golden spike into a railroad tie at this spot. The golden spike was a ceremonial spike that was driven in to celebrate the completion of San Joaquin Valley rail line. The completion of the line connected Los Angeles with San Francisco and First transcontinental railroad line. Four different wood train stations buildings served as the Lang train depot. The original 1873 station was replaced with a new station in January 1888. The second Lang Station Depot was not open long, as it caught fire and was burnt down on August 14, 1888. The third station train depot caught fire and was burnt down on October 5, 1906. The fourth station was taken down in 1969, the California Historic Landmark status given on May 22, 1957, did not save the station from demolishing. The Lang station received its name from John Lang. In 1871 Lang built a hotel at the spot to service the visitors to the nearby mineral springs. Circa 1888, the Lang springs were said to be 10 "white-sulphur" springs described as "clear and cold, with sulphur, magnesia, and iron, in the most agreeable proportions".

The First Transcontinental Railroad was completed in 1869, this connected the East Coast of the United States with San Francisco, but not Los Angeles. The Transcontinental Railroad was completed at Promontory Point, Utah, in May 1869, with two teams working from west to east and one east to west. Charles Crocker was part of the team on the western part of the Transcontinental Railroad. The western crew was built by the Central Pacific Railroad Company. Central Pacific Railroad Company was managed by Collis Huntington, Mark Hopkins, Leland Stanford, and Charles Crocker. The Southern Pacific Railroad was formed from the Central Pacific purchasing smaller railroad companies in California.

Southern Pacific Railroad purchased from Henry Mayo Newhall the San Francisco and San Jose Railroad in 1870. Southern Pacific Railroad purchased shares in Newhall's railroad from the city of San Francisco before the Newall sale. Newhall was appointed a member of the Board of Directors of the Southern Pacific Railroad. Henry Newhall later formed the city of Newhall. Newhall purchased part of Rancho San Francisco in 1875 to form the new city.

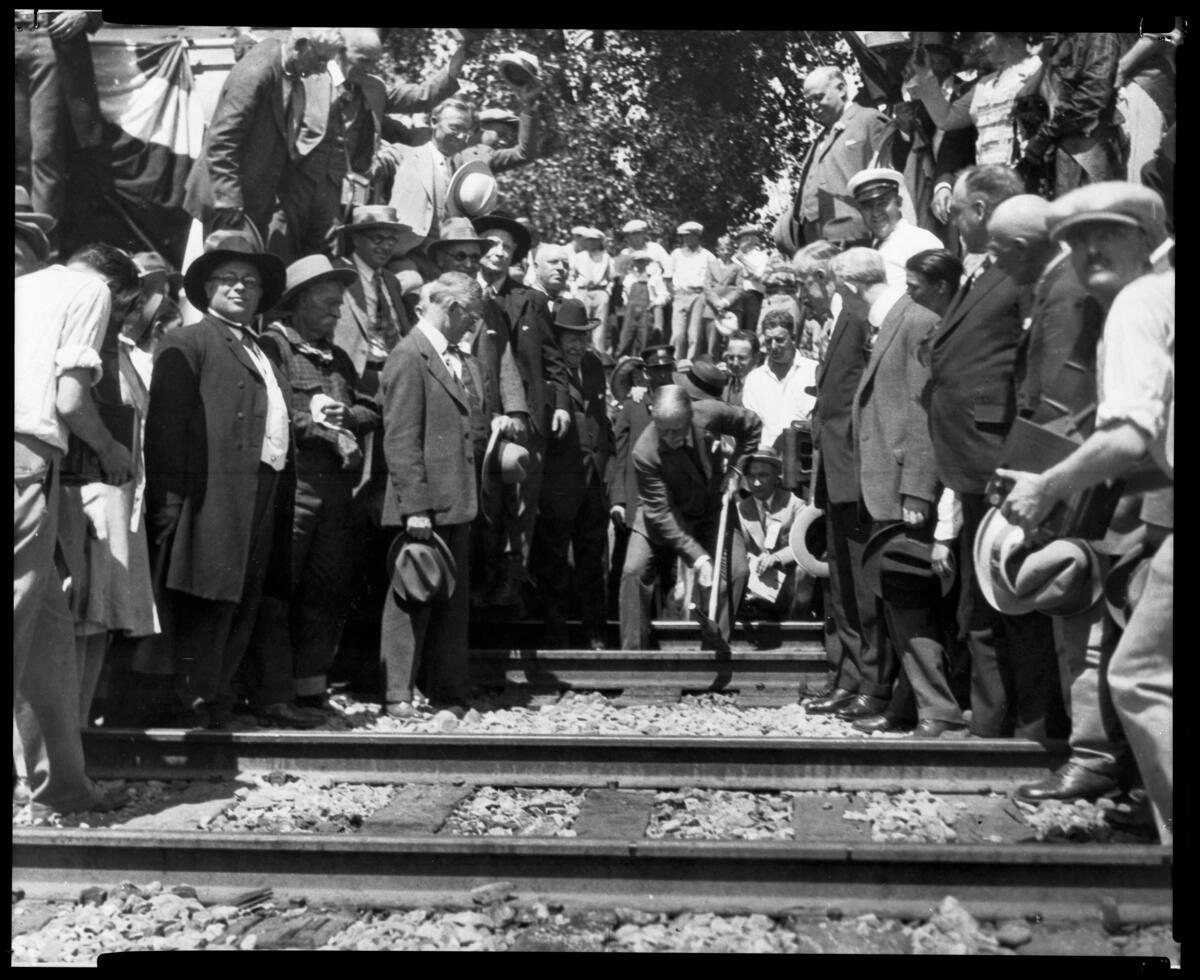
View of William Crocker as he drives a rail spike at the re-enactment of the Southern Pacific Railroad line's completion at Lang Station, September 1926 (CHS-31101.4)

In 1887 the Southern Pacific started to expand and built a line though the Santa Clarita Valley to Ventura. Along the new line, a new town was built called Saugus, the town was named after Saugus, Massachusetts, were Newhall was born. Southern Pacific built two train stations to service the valley: Newhall train station and the Saugus train Station. The Newhall train station is gone. The Saugus train station was in use till the last passenger railroad train service ended in April 1971. Freight rail service stopped in 1979. The Saugus train station closed on November 15, 1978. The Saugus Train Station was saved and moved to a new location on June 24, 1980. The Saugus train station is now next to the William S. Hart Ranch and Museum in Newhall's Heritage Junction.

The right of way of the Southern Pacific rail line is still in use as the Metrolink Antelope Valley Line, with Newhall station, Via Princessa station, Vincent Grade/Acton station and Santa Clarita station.

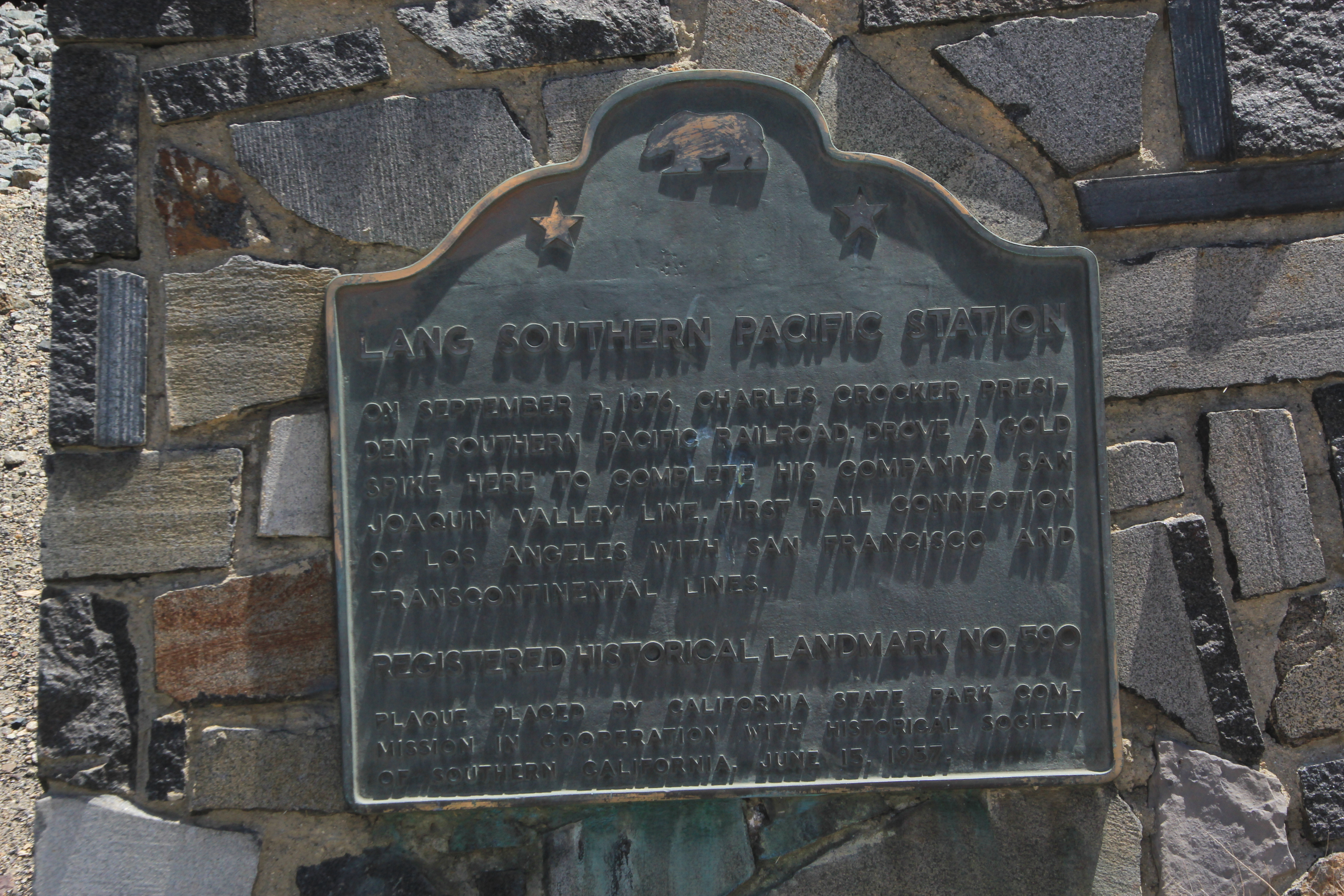
Lang Southern Pacific Station marker

== Marker ==
Marker on the site, next to the rail line tracks, reads:

- NO. 590 LANG SOUTHERN PACIFIC STATION – On September 5, 1876, Charles Crocker, President of the Southern Pacific Company, drove a gold spike here to complete his company's San Joaquin Valley line, the first rail connection of Los Angeles with San Francisco and transcontinental lines."
- Located on Lang Station Road was the road crosses the train track, off California State Route 14 and Soledad Canyon Road, near the Santa Clara River.

== See also ==
- California Historical Landmarks in Los Angeles County
- List of ranchos of California
- Ranchos of Los Angeles County, California
