= Burbank Airport–North station =

Railway station in Burbank, California

Burbank Airport–North
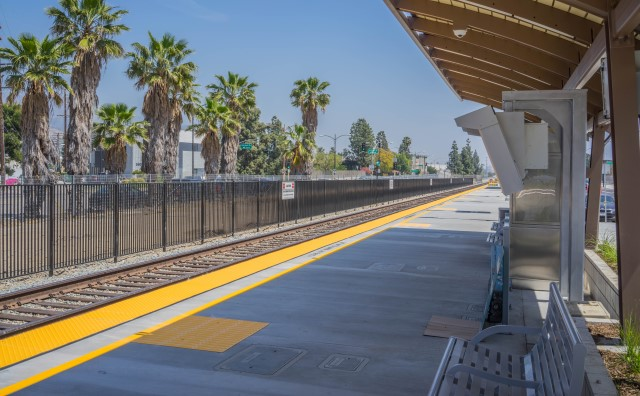
- The platform of Burbank Airport–North station

General information
- Location: 3600 North San Fernando Boulevard; Burbank, California
- Coordinates: 34°12′23″N 118°21′0″W
- Line: SCRRA Valley Subdivision
- Platforms: 1 side platform
- Tracks: 1
- Connections: Hollywood Burbank Airport Shuttle; Los Angeles Metro Bus: 169, 294

Construction
- Cycle facilities: Yes
- Accessible: Yes

History
- Opened: May 14, 2018

Passengers
- FY 2026: 100 (avg. wkdy boardings)

Services
Preceding station	Metrolink	Following station
Sun Valley toward Lancaster	Antelope Valley Line	Downtown Burbank toward L.A. Union Station
Future services
Preceding station	California High-Speed Rail	Following station
Palmdale toward Merced or San Francisco	Phase 1	Los Angeles toward Anaheim
Location

Burbank Airport–North station is a Metrolink train station in the city of Burbank, California. Passengers on the Antelope Valley Line, which travels between Lancaster, California and Union Station in downtown Los Angeles, can connect with the Hollywood Burbank Airport. The station is located near the intersection of San Fernando Boulevard and Hollywood Way and a free shuttle bus facilitates trips to the terminal located one-mile (1.6 km) from the station site. Metrolink ticket holders can also ride Los Angeles Metro Bus routes between the station and the terminal for free.

Burbank Airport–North station is served by 30 Metrolink Antelope Valley Line trains (15 in each direction) each weekday. Weekend service consists of 24 trains (12 in each direction) on both Saturday and Sunday. On all days, trains are evenly spaced throughout the day.

The station was given the name Bob Hope Airport–Hollywood Way during planning, but the name was changed prior to opening.

== History ==
In 2013, an environmental study was conducted as a prerequisite before construction could begin. Groundbreaking for the station was held on June 21, 2013. A Los Angeles County Metropolitan Transportation Authority factsheet dated April 2, 2015, said that construction was scheduled to begin in July 2015 with operations in April 2016. By March 2017, construction had begun on the station. Revenue service began May 14, 2018.

== Connections ==
- Hollywood Burbank Airport Shuttle
- Los Angeles Metro Bus: 169, 294

== Future ==
A planned California High-Speed Rail station will be located underground or below grade adjacent to the existing station. That service will initially operate between Union Station and the San Francisco 4th and King Street station with a planned start in 2033.
