= Vincent Grade/Acton station =

Train station in Acton, California, United States

Vincent Grade/Acton
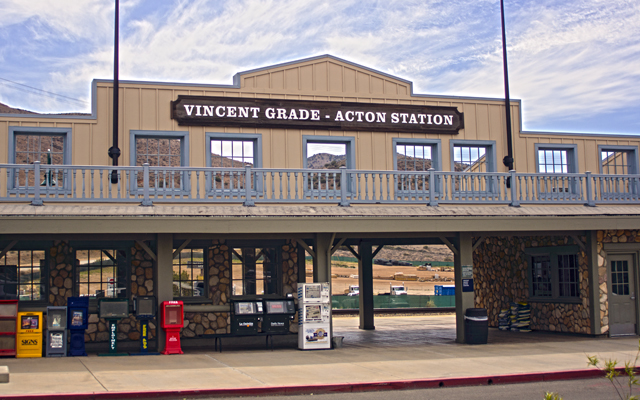
- Vincent Grade/Action station in 2015

General information
- Location: 730 West Sierra Highway; Acton, California
- Coordinates: 34°29′53″N 118°07′05″W
- Owner: Los Angeles County Department of Public Works
- Line: SCRRA Valley Subdivision
- Platforms: 2 side platforms
- Tracks: 2
- Connections: Antelope Valley Transit Authority: 790 (northbound only)

Construction
- Parking: 414 spaces, 16 accessible spaces
- Cycle facilities: Racks and lockers
- Accessible: Yes

History
- Opened: February 1, 1994

Passengers
- FY 2026: 93 (avg. wkdy boardings)

Services
Preceding station	Metrolink	Following station
Palmdale toward Lancaster	Antelope Valley Line	Vista Canyon toward L.A. Union Station
Location

Vincent Grade/Acton station is a Metrolink rail station just north of the community of Acton, California. It is served by Metrolink's Antelope Valley Line from Los Angeles Union Station to Lancaster.

Vincent Grade/Acton station is served by 22 Metrolink Antelope Valley Line trains (11 in each direction) each weekday. Weekend service consists of 12 trains (6 in each direction) on both Saturday and Sunday. On all days, trains are evenly spaced throughout the day.

The station shelters are designed to resemble Wild West-era facades.

This station predominantly serves residents of southern and eastern Palmdale, due to the station's closer proximity to these areas than the Palmdale Transportation Center in northern Palmdale.

== Connections ==
The station is served by Antelope Valley Transit Authority route 790, the North County TRANSporter. The route allows Metrolink passengers on mid-day trains (that only go as far as Newhall station in the Santa Clarita Valley) to travel to the Palmdale station. Vincent Grade/Acton station is only served in the northbound direction, by request from passengers onboard the bus.

== See also ==
- Lang Southern Pacific Station, a California Historic Landmark
