= Via Princessa station =

Train station in Santa Clarita, California, US

Via Princessa
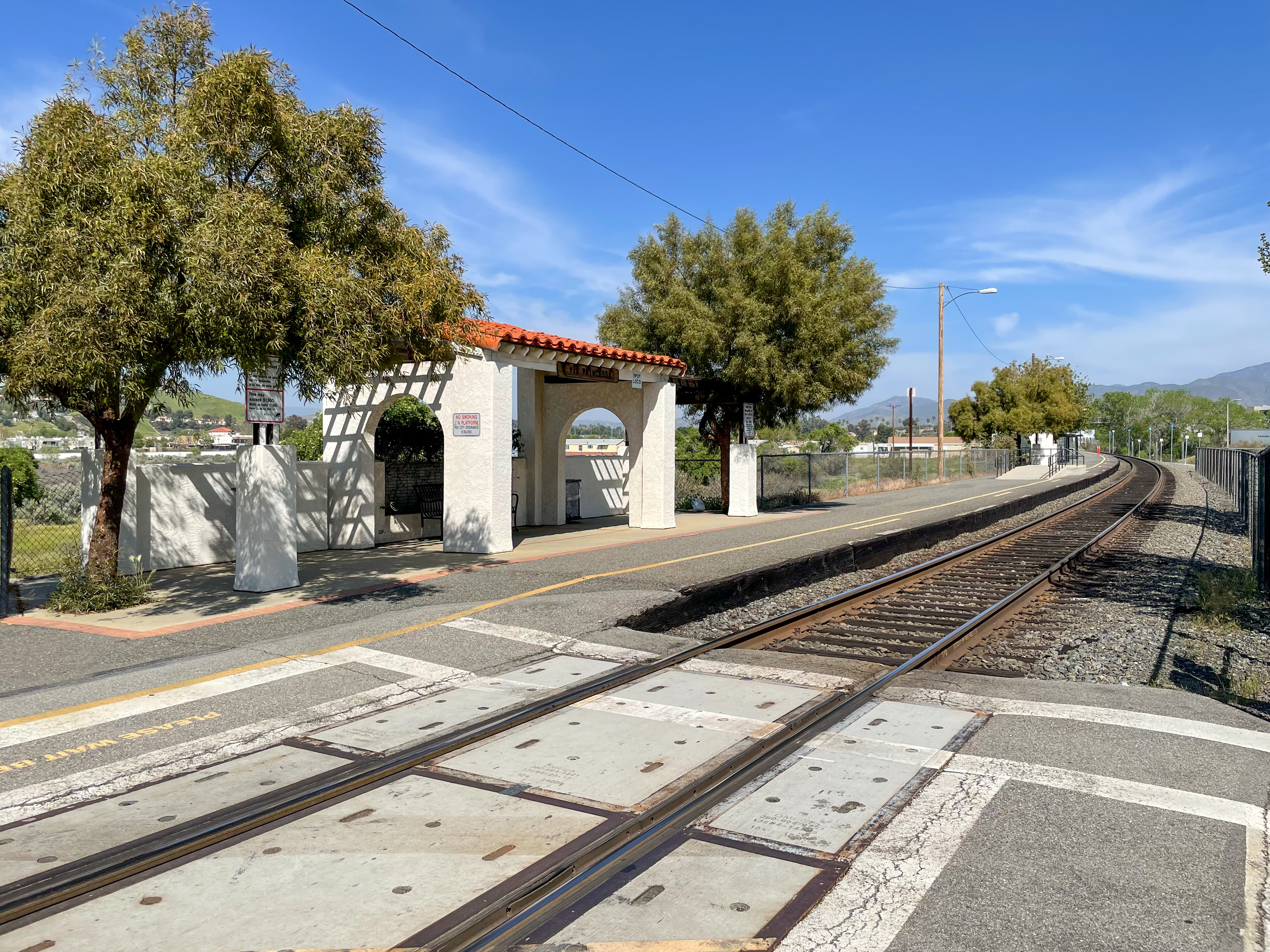
- Via Princessa station platform in April 2023

General information
- Location: 19201 Via Princessa; Santa Clarita, California
- Coordinates: 34°24′30″N 118°28′08″W
- Owner: City of Santa Clarita
- Line: SCRRA Valley Subdivision
- Platforms: 1 side platform
- Tracks: 1
- Connections: City of Santa Clarita Transit: 12

Construction
- Parking: 395 spaces
- Cycle facilities: Racks, 10 lockers, bikeway connection
- Accessible: Yes

History
- Opened: February 7, 1994

Passengers
- FY 2026: 191 (avg. wkdy boardings)

Services
Preceding station	Metrolink	Following station
Vista Canyon toward Lancaster	Antelope Valley Line	Santa Clarita toward L.A. Union Station
Location

Via Princessa station is a Metrolink train station located in the Canyon Country neighborhood of the city of Santa Clarita, California. It is served by Metrolink's Antelope Valley Line between Los Angeles Union Station and Lancaster station.

== History ==
When Metrolink service first began in 1992, trains terminated at the Santa Clarita station, but with plans to extend the line northeast to the Antelope Valley. Those plans were expedited by almost 10 years when the 1994 Northridge earthquake caused the collapse of the freeway connector of State Route 14 onto Interstate 5 at the Newhall Pass interchange. With funding from the Federal Emergency Management Agency, Metrolink constructed an emergency extension of the line along existing rails to Lancaster to help relieve the traffic bottleneck.

The U.S. Navy Seabees construction battalion and crews from the L.A. County Public Works Department were able to construct the stations along the line in just a few days, compared to the normal three to six months. Emergency stations in Lancaster and Palmdale were built in just three days, and Metrolink started operating trains one week after the earthquake struck.

After the earthquake, the existing Santa Clarita station had become crowded as ridership surged. Metrolink built the Via Princessa station to relieve some of that crowding. The Via Princessa station was the last of the emergency stations to be built and opened on February 7, 1994, exactly three weeks after the earthquake hit. The station, like the other emergency stations, offered few amenities on opening day. There was only an asphalt platform, furnished with a few bus stop-style shelters, and a 400 space paved parking lot.

While most of the other emergency stations have since been replaced with permanent stations, the Via Princessa station remains remarkably similar to this day. The station still uses the same asphalt platform built after the earthquake. In the months following the earthquake, permanent shelters were added to the station (although the bus stop-style shelters remained), along with a covered area to purchase tickets from ticket vending machines and a small security guard office. In October 2008, a permanent building containing public restrooms and an office for station security officers was constructed in the station parking lot.

== Service ==
Via Princessa station is served by 30 Metrolink Antelope Valley Line trains (15 in each direction) each weekday. Weekend service consists of 24 trains (12 in each direction) on both Saturday and Sunday. On all days, trains are evenly spaced throughout the day.

== Connections ==
As of March 2025, City of Santa Clarita Transit provides limited direct local bus service to the station via Route 12. On weekday mornings, two trips from Canyon Country drop off passengers at the station, while one evening trip picks up passengers and returns to Canyon Country. Passengers traveling on midday or weekend trains, or those heading south toward the Newhall and Friendly Valley neighborhoods, must use the bus stops on Sierra Highway at Via Princessa, approximately 0.3 miles (0.48 km) away.

For cyclists, an entrance to the Santa Clara River Trail is located on Whites Canyon Road, about 0.7 miles (1.1 km) north of the station. The City of Santa Clarita also offers bicycle lockers for rent at the station for passengers who regularly commute by bike.

== See also ==
- Lang Southern Pacific Station a California Historic Landmark
