= Antelope Valley Line =

Commuter rail line in Los Angeles County, California

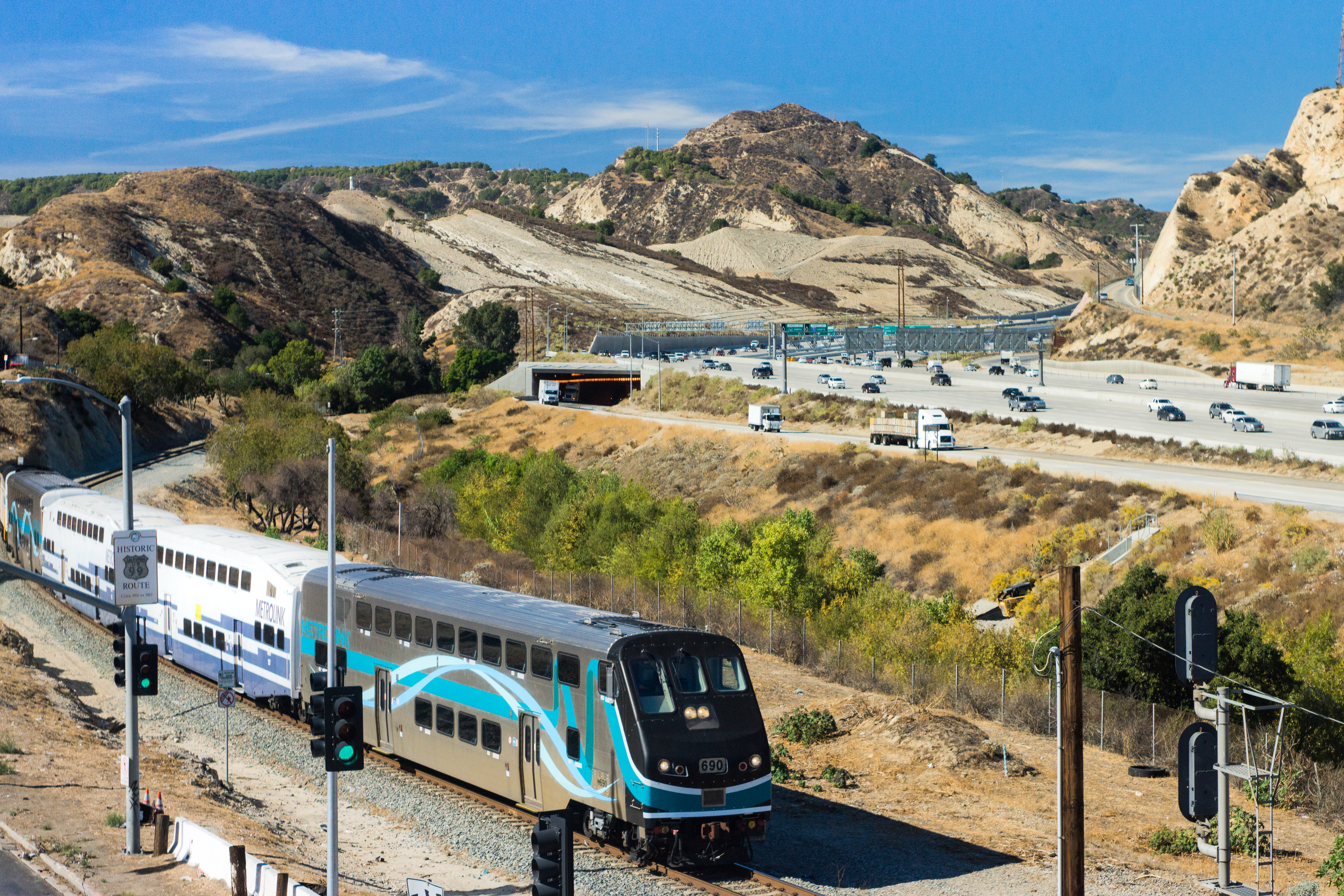
- Antelope Valley Line train descending from the Newhall Pass

Overview
- Owner: Metrolink (track; Los Angeles–Lancaster)
- Locale: Northern Greater Los Angeles Area
- Termini: Lancaster; L.A. Union Station
- Stations: 13

Service
- Type: Commuter rail
- System: Metrolink
- Operator: Metrolink
- Daily ridership: 4,489 (weekdays, Q3 2025)

History
- Opened: October 26, 1992 (as Santa Clarita Line)
- Renamed Antelope Valley Line, extended to Lancaster: January 24, 1994

Technical
- Line length: 76.6 miles (123.3 km)
- Character: Mostly surface-level with one tunnel section
- Track gauge: 4 ft 8 1/2 in (1,435 mm) standard gauge
- Operating speed: 79 mph (127 km/h) maximum 35 mph (56 km/h) average
Route map
Antelope Valley Line highlighted in green

The Antelope Valley Line is a commuter rail line that serves the Northern Los Angeles County area as part of the Metrolink system. The northern segment of the line is rural in character because it travels through the sparsely populated Soledad Canyon between Santa Clarita and Palmdale, serving the small community of Acton along the way. Other portions of its route parallel the former U.S. Route 6, now San Fernando Road and Sierra Highway. This is the only Metrolink line contained entirely within Los Angeles County.

== History ==
The line along the Santa Clara River and into Los Angeles was completed by Southern Pacific in 1876 as the first railway to connect the city to the national network. The last passenger trains operated over the line in 1971.

In 1992 the Los Angeles County Transportation Commission, predecessor of Los Angeles County Metropolitan Transportation Authority, purchased the right of way from Southern Pacific. Control of the line was then transferred to the newly-formed Southern California Regional Rail Authority who prepared the route for commuter rail service. Passenger operations began on October 26, 1992, and was called the Santa Clarita Line at the time. It was one of three original lines in the Metrolink system along with the Ventura County and San Bernardino lines. The route initially ran from Los Angeles Union Station in Downtown Los Angeles to Santa Clarita station, with intermediate stops only at Glendale and Downtown Burbank stations.

=== Earthquake traffic relief ===
Since the beginning of service, Metrolink had plans to extend the line north to the Antelope Valley but these plans were expedited by almost ten years following the 1994 Northridge earthquake. The earthquake caused the collapse of the freeway connector of State Route 14 (the Antelope Valley Freeway) onto Interstate 5 (the Golden State Freeway) at the Newhall Pass interchange, forcing all traffic in both directions to use the parallel truck route to the east of I-5 that was unaffected by the quake. With funding from the Federal Emergency Management Agency the Southern California Regional Rail Authority constructed an emergency extension of the line to Lancaster to help relieve the traffic bottleneck. The U.S. Navy Seabees construction battalion and crews from the L.A. County Public Works Department were able to construct the stations in just a few days, compared to the normal three to six months. Emergency stations in Lancaster and Palmdale were both built in just three days and Metrolink started operating trains one week after the earthquake struck. Over the next five weeks additional emergency stations were added in Sylmar/San Fernando, Vincent Grade/Acton and Santa Clarita (Via Princessa). While most of the emergency stations have since been replaced with permanent stations, the Via Princessa station still uses the same platform built after the earthquake.

=== Service expansion ===
Saturday service on the Antelope Valley Line has been operating since 1999, Sunday service was added in September 2007. As of August 2013, weekend service has expanded to 6 trains on Saturdays and Sundays. Arrivals at LA Union Station are timed to allow passengers to connect with Amtrak trains and trains on Metrolink's Orange County and San Bernardino lines.

Express service was added to the line in May 2011. Two express trains operated in the peak commute direction between Palmdale and Los Angeles (one southbound train in the morning, one northbound train in the evening). Express trains were about 18 minutes faster than trains that stop at all stations. Express service was later removed.

On April 30, 2015, Metrolink announced it will be offering discounted fares to riders on the Antelope Valley Line beginning July 1, 2015 as part of a pilot program. The fare pilot program, which will be in place for six months following the program's launch, will include several new ticket pricing options for riders on the Antelope Valley Line. There will be a 25 percent reduction in fares on all ticket types for trips along the corridor from Los Angeles to Lancaster, with the exception of the Weekend Day Pass, which will remain at its current $10 fare. In addition, a new "station-to-station" fare will be introduced in which riders traveling during off-peak hours (9 a.m. to 2 p.m.) will be able to purchase a one-way ticket to travel between stations for $2 per station. This fare is designed to encourage local trips using Metrolink as an additional mobility option complementing local bus service.

A new Burbank Airport–North station opened in 2018 to serve Antelope Valley Line passengers traveling to Hollywood Burbank Airport. The station is located near the intersection of San Fernando Boulevard and Hollywood Way, with a free shuttle bus for passengers to the airport terminal located approximately one mile away from the station site. Metrolink tickets holders may also make a free Metro bus connection with Metrolink ticket.

In July 2019, additional late evening train service and bi-directional service were being considered. An additional infill station at Vista Canyon in Santa Clarita began construction in 2020. In September 2023, the Metro Board of Directors approved $1.6 million in funding to add more midday and evening round trips starting October 23, 2023. The Vista Canyon station opened the same day the expanded timetable went into service, following a ribbon-cutting ceremony on October 20, 2023.

=== Pacoima plane crash ===
On January 9, 2022, a private Cessna 172 crashed onto the tracks of the Antelope Valley Line at Osborne Street in Pacoima after taking off from nearby Whiteman Airport and was then struck by a Metrolink train. The Cessna's pilot was injured in the initial crash, but Los Angeles Police Department officers on the scene were able to help him out of the wreckage before it was hit by the train. No one aboard the train was injured.

== Future development ==
Metrolink was awarded $107 million in 2020 Intercity Rail Capital Program funds to begin a suite of upgrades to the line that would allow increasing frequencies to half-hourly between Santa Clarita and hourly to Lancaster. The improvements could add two infill stations between Burbank and Union Station, but staff recommend against utilizing multiple units. Metro announced in October 2020 that an environmental impact report is being prepared for a project which would add new double track between the Sylmar/San Fernando and Newhall stations and a second station platform at Santa Clarita Station. Lancaster would get a new center platform and storage tracks with this project.

An expansion to Kern County has been discussed in a 2012 Kern County Council of Governments report. Trains would stop in Rosamond and Mojave.

=== Electrification ===
The California High Speed Rail Authority announced in their Draft 2026 Business Plan that they are looking to invest into the Antelope Valley Line by partnering with Metrolink and L.A. Metro to deliver upgrades to tracks and electrification, similar to their investment into Caltrain's modernization of their line and rolling stock via upgrades like electrification. However, it is unclear if the electrification will be for the entire AV line, or only on shared corridors between Metrolink and CAHSR.

Unlike the investment into Caltrain, where its right-of-way will be used as part of the route, the investment into the line will be intended for initial operations between Los Angeles and Palmdale until the rest of the separated high speed ROW can be built (such as the northern tunnel that runs between Soledad Canyon and Palmdale). Under this plan, high speed trains will be able to continue from Palmdale to Los Angeles via electrified Metrolink ROW, with a tunnel being built under Angeles National Forest to bypass Santa Clarita. High speed trains will be able to enter the tunnel at Soledad Canyon from the north, and just north of Burbank Airport from the south.

The authority states that this plan, if approved, will save billions of dollars in initial construction costs, and will allow high speed rail to service the Los Angeles basin much sooner, albeit at the cost of slower speeds than initially promised thanks to the mountainous terrain the AV line traverses through. This will persist until the rest of the private high speed ROW is built so that high speed trains can run over it instead of the AV line for faster speeds.

=== Pacoima infill station ===
Originally planned to run alongside the Antelope Valley Line right of way to Sylmar/San Fernando station, Phase 2 of the East San Fernando Valley Light Rail Transit Project was replaced by an infill interchange station with the former, located at Van Nuys Boulevard and San Fernando Road, in the Pacoima neighborhood of Los Angeles.

== Service ==
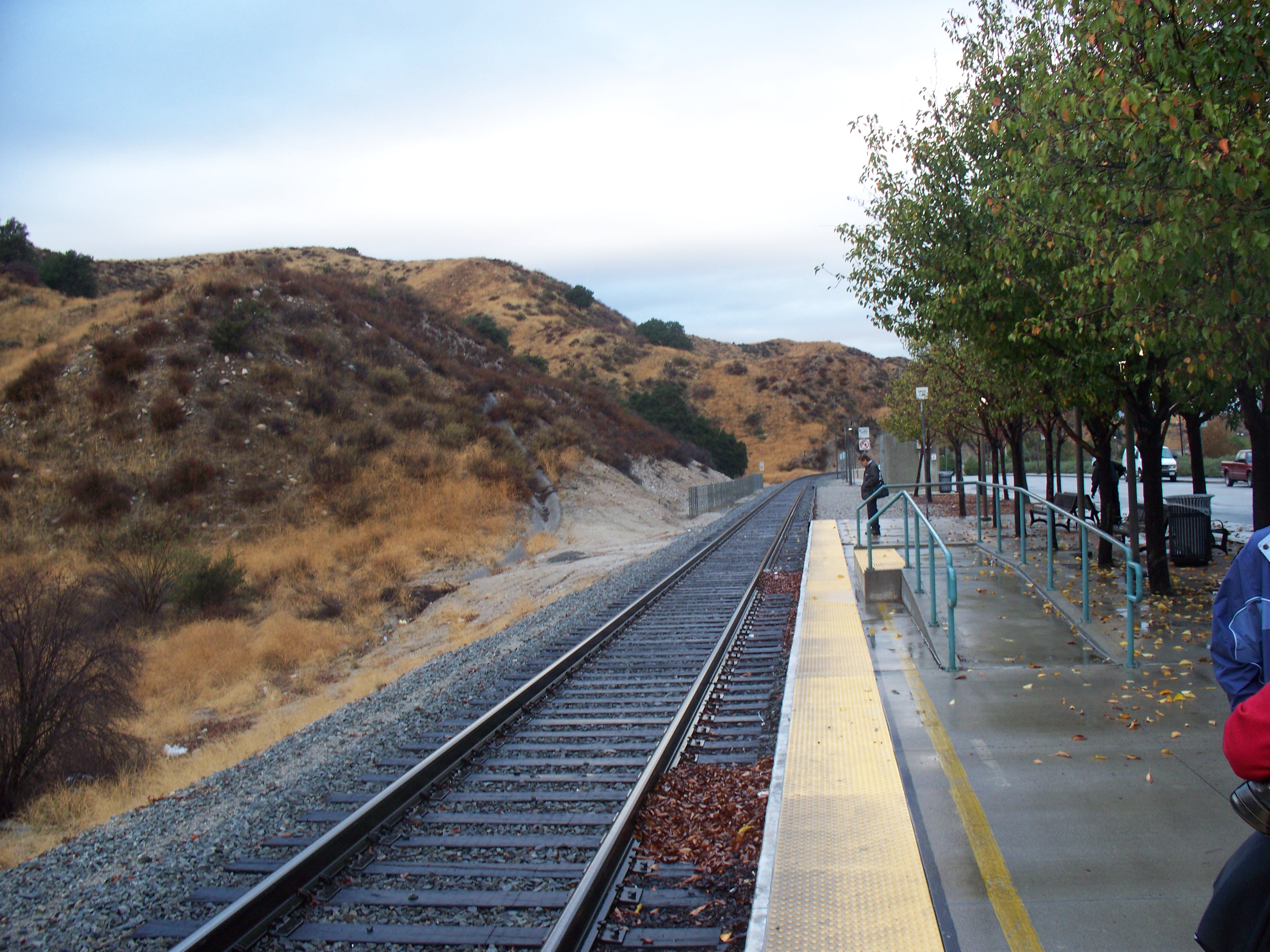
Santa Clarita station in the Soledad Canyon

As of October 23, 2023, the Antelope Valley Line is served by 30 Metrolink trains (15 in each direction) each weekday, evenly spaced throughout the day. Of those trains, 22 travel the entire length of the line from Los Angeles to Lancaster and eight trains short turn, traveling only between Los Angeles and the Vista Canyon station in Santa Clarita. Four of the short turn trains (2 in each direction) are met by Antelope Valley Transit Authority route 790, the North County TRANSporter, a bus route that allows passengers on these trains to travel to the Palmdale station.

On weekends, the Antelope Valley Line is served by 24 Metrolink trains (12 in each direction), evenly spaced throughout the day. Of those trains, 12 travel the entire length of the line from Los Angeles to Lancaster and 12 trains travel only between Los Angeles and the Via Princessa station.

== Stations ==
All stations are located in Los Angeles County.

Station	Connections	Location	Mile Marker
Lancaster		Lancaster	76.5
Palmdale		Palmdale	69.2
Vincent Grade/Acton		Acton	61.5
Vista Canyon		Santa Clarita	
Via Princessa		Santa Clarita	37.9
Santa Clarita		Santa Clarita	34.2
Newhall		Santa Clarita	30.0
Sylmar/San Fernando		Sylmar, Los Angeles	21.9
Sun Valley		Sun Valley, Los Angeles	15.4
Burbank Airport–North	Shuttle to Hollywood Burbank Airport	Burbank	13.7
Downtown Burbank	Metrolink: Ventura County	Burbank	10.8
Glendale	Metrolink: Ventura County; Amtrak: Pacific Surfliner	Glendale	5.8
L.A. Union Station	Metrolink: 91/Perris Valley Orange County Riverside San Bernardino Ventura County; Amtrak: Coast Starlight, Pacific Surfliner, Southwest Chief, Sunset Limited, Texas Eagle; Metro: A Line B Line D Line J Line; FlyAway to LAX	Downtown Los Angeles	0.0

== See also ==
- Lang Southern Pacific Station a California Historic Landmark
