= Sun Valley station =

Railway station in Los Angeles, California, United States

Sun Valley
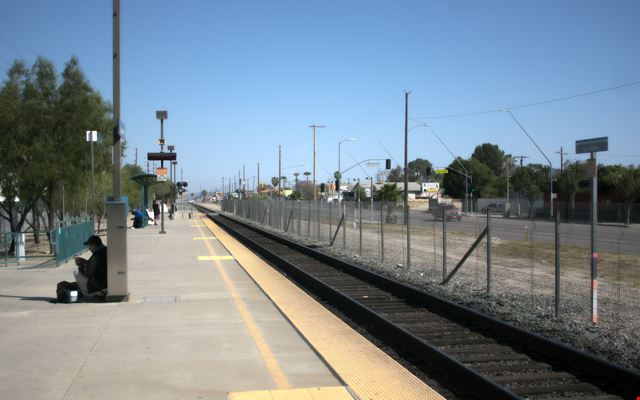
- Sun Valley station platform

General information
- Location: 8360 San Fernando Road; Los Angeles, California
- Coordinates: 34°13′21″N 118°22′26″W
- Owner: City of Los Angeles
- Line: SCRRA Valley Subdivision
- Platforms: 1 side platform
- Tracks: 1
- Connections: Los Angeles Metro Bus: 294

Construction
- Parking: 320 spaces, 8 accessible spaces
- Cycle facilities: Racks and lockers
- Accessible: Yes

History
- Opened: April 30, 2001

Passengers
- FY 2026: 78 (avg. wkdy boardings)

Services
Preceding station	Metrolink	Following station
Sylmar/San Fernando toward Lancaster	Antelope Valley Line	Burbank Airport–North toward L.A. Union Station
Location

Sun Valley station is a Metrolink train station located in the community of Sun Valley in the city of Los Angeles, California. It is served by Metrolink's Antelope Valley Line between Los Angeles Union Station and Lancaster station.

Sun Valley station is served by 30 Metrolink Antelope Valley Line trains (15 in each direction) each weekday. Weekend service consists of 24 trains (12 in each direction) on both Saturday and Sunday. On all days, trains are evenly spaced throughout the day.

== History ==
The station of Roscoe, which was a former name for Sun Valley, was a flag stop on the railroad. It was the site of multiple train robberies conducted by William Haven "Kid" Thompson and Alva Johnson in 1894.

The modern Metrolink station opened on April 30, 2001.

President of the Los Angeles City Council Paul Krekorian introduced a motion on March 22, 2023, to request City Council staff to work with the Los Angeles County Metropolitan Transportation Authority (Metro) and Metrolink regarding relocating the station to either Sunland Boulevard or Van Nuys Boulevard to better serve local residents, better connect with local bus services, and the addition of a second side platform in conjunction with the planned double-tracking of the line through the area. On May 19, 2023, the City Council approved a report calling for a study regarding the feasibility of the proposed changes.
