= Palmdale Transportation Center =

Train station in Palmdale, California, US

Palmdale
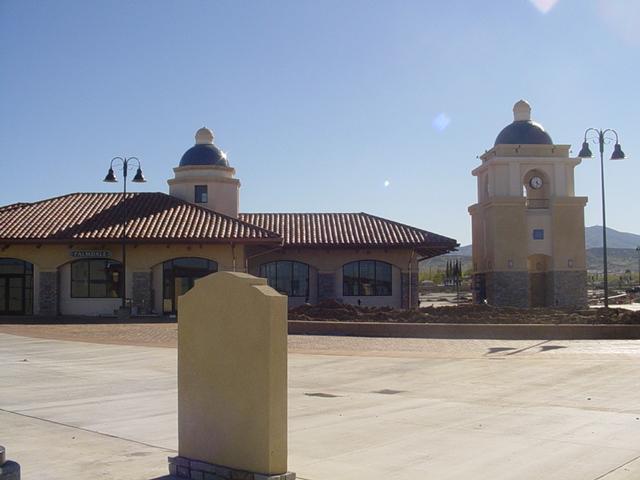
- The Palmdale Transportation Center

General information
- Location: 39000 Clock Tower Plaza Drive; Palmdale, California
- Coordinates: 34°35′27″N 118°07′10″W
- Owner: City of Palmdale
- Line: SCRRA Valley Subdivision
- Platforms: 1 side platform
- Tracks: 2
- Connections: Amtrak Thruway; Antelope Valley Transit Authority: 1, 3, 7, 8, 51, 97, 98, 785, 786, 787, 790

Construction
- Parking: 750 spaces, 18 accessible spaces
- Cycle facilities: 8 lockers Bikeway connections
- Accessible: Yes

History
- Opened: January 24, 1994
- Rebuilt: April 2005

Passengers
- FY 2026: 388 (avg. wkdy boardings)

Services
| Preceding station | Metrolink | Following station |
|---|---|---|
| Lancaster Terminus | Antelope Valley Line | Vincent Grade/Acton toward L.A. Union Station |
Future services
| Preceding station | Brightline | Following station |
|---|---|---|
| Victor Valley toward Las Vegas | Brightline West High Desert Corridor | Los Angeles Terminus |
| Preceding station | California High-Speed Rail | Following station |
| Bakersfield toward Merced or San Francisco | Phase 1 | Burbank Airport toward Anaheim |
Location

The Palmdale Transportation Center is a multi-modal transportation center in the city of Palmdale, California. Featuring a Metrolink rail station, a local bus hub, and commuter bus hub, the center was completely rebuilt in April 2005. It features a "clock tower plaza" which has an enclosed waiting room with concessions and vending, public telephone, restrooms, a bus pass sales office, and security service. The center has four partially enclosed shelters at the bus hub and six partially enclosed shelters for the rail platform. The center also includes a large park and ride facility.

== Rail service ==
Palmdale Transportation Center is served by 22 Metrolink Antelope Valley Line trains (11 in each direction) each weekday. Weekend service consists of 12 trains (6 in each direction) on both Saturday and Sunday. On all days, trains are evenly spaced throughout the day.

== Bus services ==
The center serves as a hub for the Antelope Valley Transit Authority, the city's local bus system as well as a hub for its commuter bus network to Los Angeles. The North County TRANSporter, route 790, allows Metrolink passengers on mid-day trains (that only go as far as Newhall station in the Santa Clarita Valley) to travel to Palmdale station.

Antelope Valley Transit Authority:

- Local: 1, 3, 7, 8, 51
- Commuter: 785, 786, 787, North County TRANSporter (790)
- School: 97, 98

== Future connections ==
A multi-modal high-speed rail station just south of the existing station is designated as a stop on the planned California High-Speed Rail line from San Francisco to Los Angeles.It is also proposed as a stop on the planned Brightline West high-speed rail line to Las Vegas, but not in the first phase of the project.
