= Lancaster station (California) =

Metrolink railway station in Lancaster, California

Lancaster
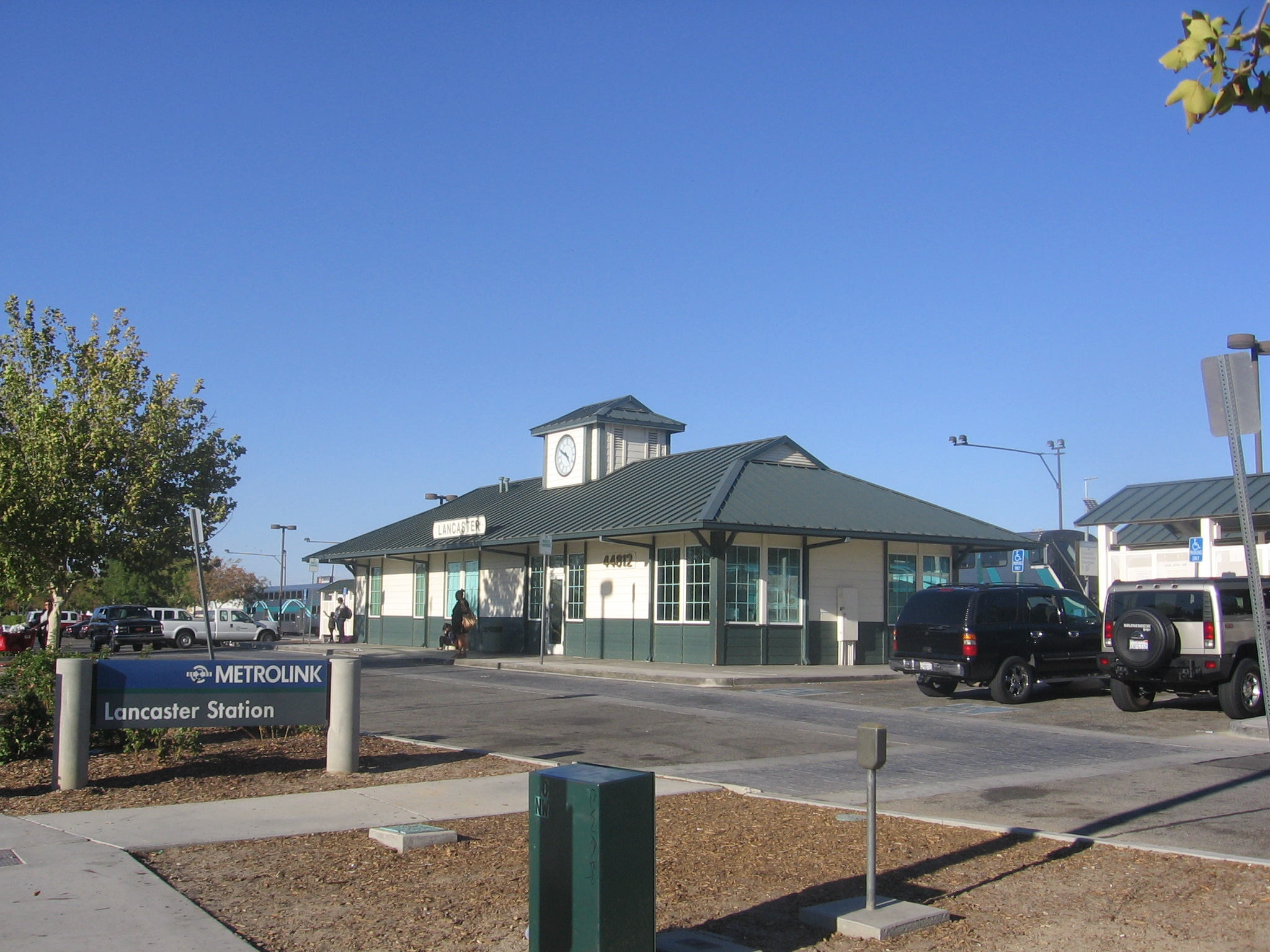
- Lancaster station, 2012

General information
- Location: 44812 Sierra Highway; Lancaster, California
- Coordinates: 34°41′48″N 118°8′12″W
- Owner: City of Lancaster
- Line: SCRRA Valley Subdivision
- Platforms: 1 side platform
- Tracks: 4 (2 bypass tracks, 1 storage track)
- Connections: Antelope Valley Transit Authority: 4, 7, 9, 11; Eastern Sierra Transit Authority: 395 South; Kern Transit: 100, 250

Construction
- Parking: 420 spaces, 5 accessible spaces
- Cycle facilities: Lockers
- Accessible: Yes

History
- Opened: January 24, 1994

Passengers
- FY 2026: 444 (avg. wkdy boardings)

Services
Preceding station	Metrolink	Following station
Terminus	Antelope Valley Line	Palmdale toward L.A. Union Station
Former services (at SP station)
Preceding station	Southern Pacific Railroad	Following station
Mojave toward Oakland Pier	San Joaquin Daylight	Saugus toward Los Angeles
Location

Lancaster station is owned by and located in the city of Lancaster, California. It serves as a transfer point for several public transportation bus routes as well as the final Metrolink train station on the Antelope Valley Line that originates 69 miles (111 km) away in downtown Los Angeles, at Union Station.

Lancaster station is served by 22 Metrolink Antelope Valley Line trains (11 in each direction) each weekday. Weekend service consists of 12 trains (6 in each direction) on both Saturday and Sunday. On all days, trains are evenly spaced throughout the day.

== History ==
Metrolink's Antelope Valley Line originally terminated in Santa Clarita, and was named the Santa Clarita line. Its plans to extend the line were expedited by almost 10 years following the 1994 Northridge earthquake, which collapsed sections of the SR 14 and I-5 freeways. The Navy Seabee construction battalion and crews from the Los Angeles County Department of Public Works built an emergency Lancaster station in three days, and Metrolink service began on January 24, one week after the earthquake.

== Connecting services ==
- Antelope Valley Transit Authority:
  - 4 – Eastside Lancaster
  - 7 – Rancho Vista/Lancaster
  - 9 – Quartz Hill via Avenue H
  - 11 – East/West Lancaster via Avenue I
- Eastern Sierra Transit:
  - 395 (Mammoth Lakes–Lancaster)
- Kern Transit:
  - 100 – Bakersfield–Lancaster
  - 250 – California City–Lancaster
