= 2002 Placentia train collision =

Railway incident in Placentia, California

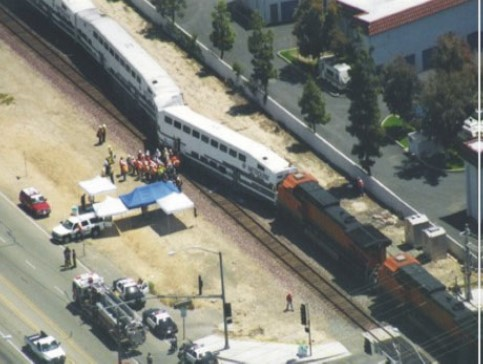
- Aerial photo of the collision

Details
- Date: April 23, 2002, 24 years ago Around 8:10 am
- Location: Placentia, California
- Country: United States
- Line: Inland Empire–Orange County Line
- Operator: Burlington Northern Santa Fe; Metrolink
- Incident type: Collision
- Cause: Failure to stop at signal

Statistics
- Trains: Burlington Northern Santa Fe freight train Metrolink passenger train
- Deaths: 2
- Injured: 141
- Damage: More than US$4,630,000
Route map

The 2002 Placentia train collision occurred at around 8:10 am. PDT on April 23, 2002, when a BNSF Railway freight train and a Metrolink commuter train collided head-on at Control Point Atwood (CP Atwood) in Placentia, California, United States.

This was the first fatal crash in the history of Metrolink, and was the second major rail incident in a week following the derailment of the Amtrak Auto Train in Florida that killed four people.

== Background ==
=== BNSF Train #5340 ===
The crew of Train #5340 came on duty at Burlington Northern Santa Fe's Hobart Yard in Commerce, California, at 2:30 a.m. the morning of the crash. The crew consisted of two men: an engineer and a conductor.

Between 2:30 a.m. and 5:30 a.m. the crew took control of their locomotive consist and connected their train, detaching a single defective car in the process.

Train #5340 consisted of three locomotives: C44-9W 5340 (lead unit), C44-9W 5277 (1st trailing unit), and SD75M 8209 (2nd trailing unit), pulling 27 multi-platform intermodal freight cars (a total of 67 intermodal platforms).

Several trains with higher priority were cleared to depart ahead of Train #5340, delaying their departure. While they waited, the conductor reported taking an hour and a half nap.

Train #5340 was finally cleared to leave at 7:30 a.m. and departed Hobart Yard heading eastbound with a final destination of Clovis, New Mexico.

=== Metrolink Train No. 809 ===
The crew of Metrolink Train No. 809 – consisting of an engineer and a conductor – reported for duty at Riverside, California, at 1:30 a.m. the morning of the crash.

The train consisted of Bombardier cab car 634, a few Bombardier bi-level passenger cars, and F59PH 859.

Prior to operating Train No. 809 the crew uneventfully headed trains to Irvine and Los Angeles, before crewing a return trip to Riverside arriving at 7:05 am.

At 7:32 am. Train No. 809 departed Riverside bound for San Juan Capistrano operating on the Inland Empire–Orange County Line. Train No. 809 was running in push–pull configuration with the locomotive a EMD F59PH at the rear of the train, pushing three Bombardier bi-level passenger cars.

== Crash ==
Metrolink Train No. 809 was scheduled to follow Burlington Northern Santa Fe's San Bernardino Subdivision, making stops at Riverside–La Sierra, Corona–North Main and Corona–West before entering Metrolink's Olive Subdivision at Atwood Interlocking (Control Point Atwood) to head south to Anaheim Canyon station. Approaching the interlocking from the east, Train No. 809 was displayed a "diverging clear" signal to proceed onto the Olive Subdivision.

Approaching the interlocking from the west, Burlington Northern Santa Fe Train #5340 was displayed an "approach" signal at CP Basta (around seven miles from CP Atwood). This "approach" signal indicated that the train needed to slow to 30 mph to prepare to stop ahead.

Around two miles before the interlocking, Train #5340 was displayed another "approach" signal. While the engineer recalled having heard his conductor call out the signal as "clear" and having verbally acknowledged this, he later told investigators that he had not seen the signal himself and had relied on the word of his conductor. Both the engineer and conductor proceeded under the belief that they had a "clear" signal and the engineer returned the train to its normal operating speed of 49 mph.

As Train #5340 approached CP Atwood, the crew noticed that the signal ahead was displaying "stop" and that Metrolink Train No. 809 was directly ahead on the same track. The engineer immediately placed the train in emergency braking mode, however by then it was too late for the nearly mile-long train to stop short of the interlocking.

At nearly the same time, the engineer of Metrolink Train No. 809 (who was alone in the cab at the time) noticed Train #5340 approaching directly ahead on the same track. The engineer placed Train No. 809 in emergency and ran out of the cab and through the train, yelling for passengers to brace themselves.

Train No. 809 – which had been traveling at 25 mph to proceed onto the diverging track – quickly came to a stop short of the interlocking.

When it became clear to the crew of Train #5340 that a collision was inevitable, they jumped clear of the locomotive. Twelve seconds later Train No. 809 was struck head-on by Train #5340, which by then was traveling at around 23 mph. The crash occurred adjacent to the Richfield Road grade crossing. The force of the collision drove Train No. 809 backwards an estimated 243 feet and partially derailed the leading passenger car.

The collision was partially captured on video by a security camera at a nearby commercial storage facility.

== Emergency response and aftermath ==
The Orange County Fire Authority was the first emergency response agency on scene, arriving within three minutes of the initial call-out. Somewhat coincidentally, the Orange County Fire Authority was scheduled to participate in a large-scale joint mass-casualty training drill with the Brea Fire Department the morning of the incident. Both departments were preparing for the drill when they received a call-out to the scene of the crash and subsequently diverted their resources.

The evacuation was largely uneventful. The collision damaged the aft stairwell of the leading passenger car that connected the upper and lower levels, thus momentarily slowing the evacuation of passengers from on the upper deck. Passengers were easily able to remove an emergency window exit and climb out and down a ladder to safety.

Several passengers reported that the engineers' warning as he ran through the train had allowed them to assume positions that they believed prevented them from sustaining more serious injuries.

When emergency responders reached the upper deck, they found two severely-wounded passengers lying in the aisle. Emergency medical care was performed on both passengers at the scene, but unfortunately to no avail. The two fatalities were later reported by the Los Angeles Times to be Robert Kube, 59, of Moreno Valley and Larry Sorenson, 48, of Pedley. Both men were found to have been sitting next to each other at a workstation table facing the direction of travel, and both sustained blunt force trauma. Investigators believed these injuries may have been suffered from striking the table, which was attached to the floor.

A third passenger who had sustained minor injuries in the crash subsequently died a few months later. The National Transportation Safety Board (NTSB) report concluded that her cause of death was unrelated to the injuries she suffered in the collision.

The damage to all railroad equipment was relatively minor, and all equipment involved was repaired and returned to service. Nonetheless, the NTSB investigation estimated the cost of damage to be around US$4,630,000.

== Investigation ==
Investigators determined the probable cause of the crash to have been the inattentiveness of the crew of Burlington Northern Santa Fe Train #5340 to the operation of their train, causing their failure to heed the "approach" signal two miles before the crash. Both men were found to have used their mobile phones during the trip, and at the time they passed the "approach" signal were deep in a discussion regarding their shared previous employment at the same oil refinery.

The lack of positive train control on the Burlington Northern Santa Fe's San Bernardino Subdivision was also listed as a contributing factor.

== In popular culture ==
It was featured in the American docudrama television series Critical Rescue as the disaster of the third episode, "Fateful Journey".
