= Placentia station =

Proposed train station in Placentia, California, United States

Placentia

General information
- Location: Placentia, California
- Coordinates: 33.8684°N 117.8726°W
- Line: BNSF Railway San Bernardino Subdivision
- Platforms: 2 side platforms
- Tracks: 2

Construction
- Parking: Yes

History
- Opening: TBD

Future services
Preceding station	Metrolink	Following station
Fullerton toward L.A. Union Station	91/Perris Valley Line	Corona–West toward Perris–South
Former services (at AT&SF station)
Preceding station	Atchison, Topeka and Santa Fe Railway	Following station
Fullerton toward Los Angeles	Main Line Via Fullerton, Riverside	Prado toward Chicago
Location

Placentia station is a proposed Metrolink infill station located in the city of the same name along Metrolink's 91/Perris Valley Line.

The Orange County Transportation Authority (OCTA) started discussing the station as early as 2012. A station planned for neighboring Yorba Linda was rejected by its local city council on March 16, 2004. The project was approved by the city in 2016, with construction planned to begin in 2018. A former packing house was demolished on the site to make way for the station. As of April 2019 construction was repeatedly delayed, owing to negotiations between Metrolink and the track's owners, BNSF. In January 2020, it was announced that construction of the Placentia Metrolink station would begin later in the year, with the station expected to be open by June 2022, but it has once again been delayed, with OCTA claiming construction of the project is "on hold" until mid-2024.

The cost of the project is due at $34.8 million, of which the city pledged $5.4 million. In 2014, the project was pegged at an estimated $23.42 million, while a 2012 estimate was between $7.5–9 million.
