= Riverside Transit Agency =

Transit system in Riverside County, California, United States

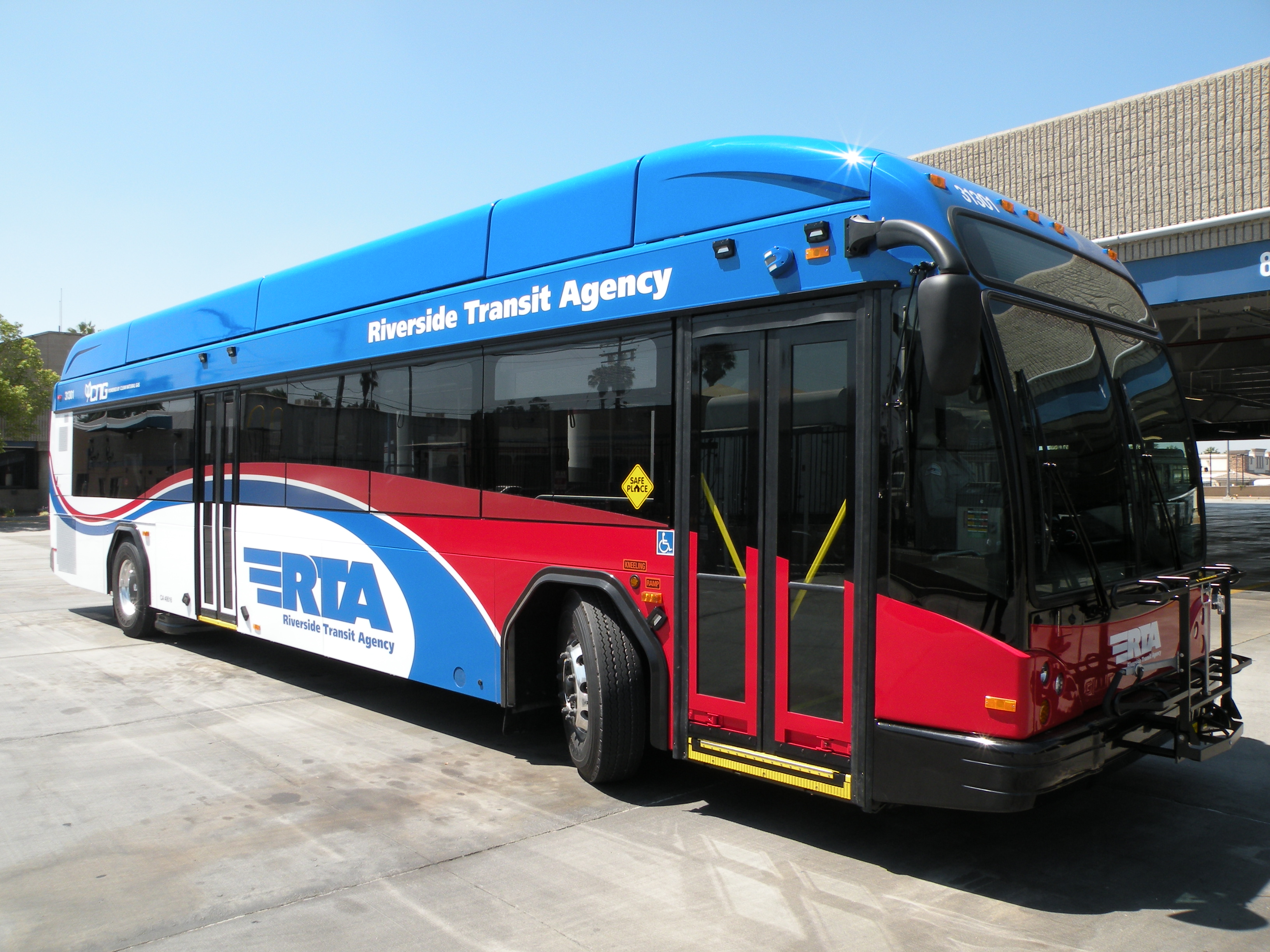
- Founded: 1975
- Headquarters: 1825 Third Street; Riverside, CA 92517-1968
- Service area: Western Riverside County, California, United States
- Service type: Bus service, paratransit
- Routes: 48
- Fleet: 339
- Daily ridership: 22,100 (weekdays, Q2 2026)
- Annual ridership: 6,251,200 (2025)
- Fuel type: Compressed natural gas
- Website: riversidetransit.com

The Riverside Transit Agency (RTA) is the main transit agency for western Riverside County, California, United States. RTA provides both local and regional services throughout the region with 32 fixed-routes, 3 CommuterLink routes, Micro Transit in the Hemet-San Jacinto area, and Dial-A-Ride services using a fleet of 339 vehicles. In the cities of Corona, Beaumont and Banning, RTA coordinates regional services with municipal transit systems. In Riverside, RTA coordinates with the city's Riverside Special Services, which provides ADA complementary service to RTA's fixed-route services.

RTA was established as a joint powers agency on August 15, 1975, and began operating bus service on March 16, 1977.

In 2025, the system had a ridership of 6,251,200, or about 22,100 per weekday as of the second quarter of 2026.

== Governance ==
RTA is governed by a board of directors composed of 22 elected officials from 18 cities in western Riverside County and four members of the County Board of Supervisors.

The member jurisdictions include the cities of Banning, Beaumont, Canyon Lake, Corona, Eastvale, Hemet, Jurupa Valley, Lake Elsinore, Moreno Valley, Menifee, Murrieta, Norco, Perris, Riverside, San Jacinto, Temecula, Wildomar and the unincorporated areas of Riverside County Supervisorial Districts I, II, III and V.

== Rates ==
As of 9-01-2026 ($0.25 a ride before that to 8-31-2026, youths up to 18 free):

Local and RapidLink route fares
| Fare categories | Base fares | 1-day pass | 7-day pass | 30-day pass |
|---|---|---|---|---|
| General | $1.75 | $5 | $20 | $60 |
| Youth (grades 1–12) | $0 | $0 | $20 | $45 |
| Senior/Disabled/Veteran/Medicare | $0.75 | $2.50 | $20 | $30 |
| Child (46" tall or under, up to 3) | $0.50 | | | |

CommuterLink Fares
| Fare categories | Base fares |
|---|---|
| General | $3.5 |
| Youth (grades 1–12) | $3.5 |
| Senior/Disabled/Veteran/Medicare | $2.75 |
| Child (46" tall or under, up to 3) | $0.25 |

CommuterLink + Local + RapidLink fares
| Fare categories | 1-day pass | 30-day pass |
|---|---|---|
| General | $10 | $95 |
| Youth (grades 1–12) | $10 | $95 |
| Senior/Disabled/Veteran/Medicare | $7 | $70 |
| Child (46" tall or under, up to 3) | | |

Dial-A-Ride
| Fare categories | Base fares | Ticket books |
|---|---|---|
| Senior / disabled | $3.50 | $35 |
| Medicare Card Holder | $3.50 | $35 |
| Child (46" tall or under, up to 3) | $0.75 | N/A |

- Rates resumed 9-01-2024 thru 5-31-2026. June through August 2026 rates are $0.25 per ride, except 6–18 (free to all), 6-19 (no service), & Fridays in June, no charge.

=== College passes ===
In September 2006, RTA partnered with the University of California, Riverside (UCR) to provide their students with an all-access bus pass. UC Riverside students get free rides on all fixed-route and CommuterLink buses by swiping their valid university identification cards through any RTA bus farebox when they board. The program, called U-Pass, is designed to help ease traffic congestion around campus, reduce parking problems and encourage ride-sharing. Additionally, RTA operates a trolley service called the Crest Cruiser that is free to UCR students and travels around the university to off-campus housing and retail outlets. Students of La Sierra University have also benefited from U-Pass since January 2009, and California Baptist University joined the program in August 2009.

As of August 21, 2008, RTA has also partnered with Riverside Community College District (RCCD) to provide the same free transit services to students at the Riverside City, Norco College and Moreno Valley college campuses. The program, called Go Pass, requires that students swipe their valid RCCD ID cards through the bus farebox when boarding. As of August 2014, the Go-Pass has logged more than 4.5 million RCCD student rides.

In August 2010, RTA expanded the reach of its Go-Pass program by partnering with the Mt. San Jacinto College District. Students at the Banning, Menifee and San Jacinto campuses who pay their student fees are allowed unlimited rides on all fixed-route and CommuterLink buses with the swipe of their ID card.

=== Fare subsidies ===
Under an agreement with the Riverside County courts, anyone serving as a juror at the Riverside, Banning and Murrieta courthouses is entitled to free travel on any RTA bus.

Any person who meets RTA active duty military, police or fire personnel requirements rides free on RTA fixed-route buses. Active duty military personnel must wear the appropriate uniform at the time of boarding or present to the driver a valid U.S. Uniformed Services ID card indicating active service or a Common Access card indicating uniformed services or active duty. Police and fire personnel must be in full uniform at the time of boarding. Customers must wear the appropriate uniform or show appropriate ID each time they board a bus to receive the discounted fare.

== Transit centers ==
RTA maintains several transit centers throughout their service area. Downtown Riverside is served by the Vine Street Mobility Hub

The Downtown Perris station, located between 1st and 2nd Streets, east of C Street in Perris, opened on January 10, 2010, with six bus bays and a park and ride lot. The center is also a station for weekend excursion trains from the Orange Empire Railway Museum, and is a station on Metrolink's 91/Perris Valley Line.

The Corona Transit Center opened in September 2010, adjacent to the North Main Corona Metrolink station. The center has 8 bus bays, additional park-and-ride parking and a direct connection to the Metrolink station and its associated parking garage via a pedestrian bridge.

Major transfer points are also located at several shopping centers throughout the area such as The Galleria at Tyler, the Moreno Valley Mall, the Hemet Valley Mall, the Outlets at Lake Elsinore, and Temecula's Promenade Mall.

== Routes ==
=== Local routes ===
RTA's service consists of 32 local fixed routes and three CommuterLink Express routes. The fixed-route service includes tourist trolleys (stylized rubber-tired buses, not to be confused with actual trolleys). The agency also provides dial-a-ride service in compliance with the Americans with Disabilities Act.

Local college students ride free with the U-Pass program.

| Route | Terminals | | Via | Notes |
|---|---|---|---|---|
| 1 | Corona Smith Av & 6th St | Riverside UC Riverside (at Bannockburn Village) | Magnolia Av | Serves Corona–North Main Metrolink Station, Galleria at Tyler, California Baptist University, Riverside City College and Vine Street Mobility Hub |
| 3 | Corona Corona Transit Center | Eastvale Amazon Eastvale | Main St, Hammer Av | Serves Norco College |
| 8 | Lake Elsinore Outlet at Lake Elsinore | | Mission Trail, Grand Av | Clockwise and Counter-clockwise route |
| 9 | Lake Elsinore Outlet at Lake Elsinore | Perris Perris Transit Center | Central Av | |
| 10 | Riverside Galleria at Tyler | Riverside Big Springs Rd & Watkins Dr | Lincoln Av | |
| 11 | Moreno Valley Moreno Valley Mall | | Frederick St, Cactus Av & Lasselle St. | Served Lake Perris |
| 12 | Corona Promenade Av & McKinley St | Riverside La Cadena Dr & Interchange St | California Av, Main St | Serves Galleria at Tyler and Riverside City College |
| 13 | Riverside Galleria at Tyler | Riverside Riverside–Hunter Park/UCR Station | Arlington Av | Serves Riverside City College |
| 14 | Riverside Galleria at Tyler | Loma Linda VA Hospital | Indiana Av, Washington St | |
| 15 | Riverside Galleria at Tyler | Riverside Riverside-Downtown Station | Arlington Av | Serves Riverside–La Sierra Metrolink Station and Riverside City College |
| 16 | Riverside UC Riverside (at Bannockburn Village) | Moreno Valley Moreno Valley Mall | Canyon Crest Dr, Box Springs Rd | |
| 18 | Moreno Valley Moreno Valley Mall | | Sunnymead Ranch Pkwy | Loop route, Serves to Ironwood & Moreno Beach via Sunnymead Ranch Parkway. |
| 19 | Perris Perris Transit Center | Moreno Valley Moreno Valley Mall | Perris Bl | Serves Moreno Valley College |
| 20 | Riverside Magnolia Av & Elizabeth St | Moreno Valley Iris Av & Lasselle St | Alessandro Bl | Serves Moreno Valley/March Field Metrolink Station and Moreno Valley College |
| 21 | Riverside Galleria at Tyler | Jurupa Valley Jurupa Valley/Pedley Station | Van Buren Bl | |
| 22 | Perris Perris Station Transit Center | Downtown Riverside University Av & Market St | Alessandro Bl, Old Elsinore Rd | Serves Vine Street Mobility Hub |
| 23 | Temecula Promenade Temecula | Wildomar Palomar St & Wildomar Trail | Murrieta Hot Springs Rd | |
| 24 | Temecula Promenade Temecula | Temecula Redhawk Pkwy & Via Rio Temecula | Pechanga Pkwy | Serves Mt. San Jacinto College (MSJC) Temecula Valley Campus, Pechanga Resort, and Temecula Valley Hospital. |
| 27 | Perris Perris Transit Center | Riverside Galleria at Tyler | I-215, Van Buren Av | |
| 28 | Perris Perris Transit Center | Valle Vista Florida Av & New Chicago Av | I-215, Florida Av | |
| 29 | Eastvale Amazon Eastvale | Riverside Vine Street Mobility Hub | Limonite Av | |
| 30 | Perris Perris Transit Center | | Redlands Av | Loop route |
| 31 | San Jacinto Mt. San Jacinto College San Jacinto | Moreno Valley Moreno Valley Mall | SR 60 | Serves to Ironwood & Moreno Beach and Beaumont. |
| 41 | Mead Valley Mead Valley Community Center | Moreno Valley Riverside University Medical Center | Ramona Expwy | Serves Moreno Valley College via Ironwood & Moreno Beach. |
| 44 | Hemet Hemet Valley Mall | | State St, San Jacinto Av | Clockwise route |
| 44 | San Jacinto Mt. San Jacinto College | | State St, San Jacinto Av | Counter-clockwise route |
| 49 | Fontana Banana Av & Cherry Av | Riverside Vine Street Mobility Hub | Mission Bl | |
| 51 | Riverside Iowa Av & University Village | | Canyon Crest Dr | Clockwise route; Serves UC Riverside |
| 55 | Temecula Village Rd & Harveston Way | | Harveston Dr | Clockwise route; Free Service; Serves Promenade Temecula |
| 56 | Riverside Riverside–Hunter Park/UCR Station | | Iowa Av | Loop route; Serves UC Riverside |
| 61 | Temecula Promenade Temecula | Perris Perris Transit Center | Newport Rd | Serves Mt. San Jacinto College |
| 74 | Menifee Cherry Hills Bl & Bradley Rd | Hemet Hemet Valley Mall | Newport Rd | Serves Mt. San Jacinto College |
| 79 | Temecula Promenade Temecula | Hemet Hemet Valley Mall | Winchester Rd | |

=== CommuterLink routes ===
In 2003, RTA launched CommuterLink, its first bus service designed to serve Riverside County's growing number of commuters. The specially designed express buses have limited stop service to major transit centers and Metrolink stations in Riverside county. In 2005, RTA debuted free Wi-Fi Internet service aboard its Temecula-Riverside CommuterLink Route 202, making the agency among the first in Southern California to offer such amenities aboard public buses. By the end of 2016, Wi-fi was offered on all of the agency's fixed-route buses.

| Route | Terminals | | Via | Notes |
|---|---|---|---|---|
| 200 | San Bernardino San Bernardino Transit Center | Anaheim Disneyland | SR 91, I-215 | Serves Vine Street Mobility Hub, Galleria at Tyler and Riverside–La Sierra Metrolink Station |
| 204 | Montclair Montclair Transit Center | Riverside UC Riverside (at Bannockburn Village) | I-10, SR 60 | Serves Ontario Mills |
| 206 | Corona Corona Transit Center | Temecula Promenade Temecula | I-15 | |

== Bus fleet ==
=== Active fleet ===
| Make/Model | Fleet numbers | Thumbnail | Year | Engine | Transmission |
|---|---|---|---|---|---|
| Hometown Manufacturing Villager | 1–5 | | 2018 | Ford Triton V10 | 6-Speed Automatic with Overdrive |
| Gillig BRT CNG 40 | 31301 | | 2011 | Cummins Westport ISL G | Allison B400R |
| Gillig BRT CNG 40 | 31302-31334 | | 2012 | Cummins Westport ISL G | Allison B400R |
| Gillig BRT CNG 40 | 31335-31369 | | 2013 | Cummins Westport ISL G | Allison B400R |
| Gillig BRT CNG 40 | 31370-31397 | | 2014 | Cummins Westport ISL G | Allison B400R |
| Gillig BRT CNG 40 | 31401-31411 | | 2015 | Cummins Westport ISL G | Allison B400R |
| Gillig BRT CNG 40 | 31601-31614 | | 2016 | Cummins Westport ISL G | Allison B400R |
| Gillig BRT CNG 40 | 31621-31643 | | 2017 | Cummins Westport L9N | Allison B400R |
| Gillig BRT CNG 40 | 32301-32335 | | 2023 | Cummins Westport L9N | Allison B3400 xFE |
| Gillig BRT CNG 40 | 32336-32370 | | 2024 | Cummins Westport L9N | Allison B3400 xFE |

RTA's 40-foot and CommuterLink buses are powered entirely by compressed natural gas, with the agency's conversion to the fuel completed in 2001. They also operate CNG fueling stations at their Riverside and Hemet maintenance facilities that help fuel not only transit vehicles but also the alternative-fuel fleet of various government agencies.

An RTA tourist trolley sitting at the Route 56 bus stop at the Riverside–Hunter Park/UCR station.

In 2013, RTA began the process of replacing their old NABI 40 LFW fleet with newer 42-foot, Gillig Low Floor BRT Suburban buses. RTA's traditional red, white, and blue colors were updated to feature solid blue on the top portion of the bus, with a ribbon of blue and red around the bus's sides and rear. The modern buses also have a more spacious interior, padded and contoured seats, colored headsigns, USB charging ports for customers' mobile phones and tablets, and a design that allows for quicker wheelchair fastening and overall faster customer boarding.

RTA received a $5.1 million grant from the U.S. Department of Transportation for an initial purchase of five 40-foot New Flyer Xcelsior hydrogen electric buses with the goal of rolling them out by summer of 2026. RTA aims to replace all of their 147 buses with zero-emission buses in phases, starting with this initial procurement.

== Financials ==
RTA is largely funded by passenger fares, Local Transportation Funds (LTF), Federal Transit Administration (FTA), State Transit Assistance (STA), Riverside County Measure A, and Transportation Uniform Mitigation Fees (TUMF).

== Transportation NOW ==
In 1992, RTA's board of directors created 'Transportation NOW' to promote the discussion of public transportation alternatives. Since then, the program has grown to include six chapters: Greater Riverside, Hemet San Jacinto area, Moreno Valley/Perris, Northwest, San Gorgonio Pass area, and Southwest. Each chapter meets monthly to discuss current issues surrounding public transit and ways to promote its usage and lobby for improvements.
