= Riverside–Downtown station =

Train station in Riverside, California, U.S.

Riverside–Downtown
- The Riverside-Downtown station in 2026

General information
- Other names: Joseph Tavaglione Riverside Downtown Station
- Location: 4066 Vine Street; Riverside, California; United States
- Coordinates: 33.9757°N 117.3699°W
- Owner: Riverside County Transportation Commission
- Lines: BNSF San Bernardino Subdivision; UP Los Angeles Subdivision
- Platforms: 1 side platform, 2 island platforms
- Tracks: 6
- Connections: Riverside Transit Agency: 1, 15, 22, 29, 49, 200; Omnitrans: 215; Amtrak Thruway: 19

Construction
- Parking: 710 spaces
- Cycle facilities: Yes
- Accessible: Yes

Other information
- Station code: Amtrak: RIV

History
- Opened: June 14, 1993

Passengers
- FY 2025: 9,468 annually (Amtrak)
- FY 2026: 654 weekday boardings (Metrolink)

Services
Preceding station	Amtrak	Following station
Fullerton toward Los Angeles	Southwest Chief	San Bernardino toward Chicago
Preceding station	Metrolink	Following station
Riverside–La Sierra toward L.A. Union Station	91/Perris Valley Line	Riverside–Hunter Park/UCR toward Perris–South
Riverside–La Sierra toward Oceanside	Inland Empire–Orange County Line	San Bernardino–Depot toward San Bernardino–Downtown
Jurupa Valley/Pedley toward L.A. Union Station	Riverside Line	Terminus
Location

Riverside–Downtown station (officially the Joseph Tavaglione Riverside Downtown Station) is a train station in Riverside, California, United States. It is served by three Metrolink commuter rail lines – the 91/Perris Valley Line, Inland Empire–Orange County Line, and Riverside Line – and Amtrak intercity rail service on the Southwest Chief. The station is owned by the Riverside County Transportation Commission.

== Station layout ==
The station has two island platforms and one side platform. It is located at the east end of the Union Pacific Railroad (UP) Los Angeles Subdivision at its junction with the BNSF San Bernardino Subdivision. The northern island platform and the side platform serve the UP main track and a stub-end siding; they are used only by Riverside Line trains. The three-track BNSF mainline is between the island platforms; the southern island platform (used by Amtrak, 91/Perris Valley Line, and Inland Empire–Orange County Line trains) serves the southern main track and a siding track.

== Hours and frequency ==
Riverside–Downtown station is served by 14 Metrolink 91/Perris Valley Line trains (7 in each direction) each weekday, running primarily at peak hours in the peak direction of travel. Weekend service consists of 4 trains (2 in each direction) on both Saturday and Sunday, running westbound in the morning and eastbound in the evening.

The station is served by 10 Metrolink Riverside Line trains (5 in each direction) each weekday, running primarily at peak hours in the peak direction of travel. There is no service on weekends.

Additionally, the station is served by 18 Metrolink Inland Empire–Orange County Line trains (9 in each direction) each weekday, running primarily at peak hours in the peak direction of travel. Weekend service consists of 4 trains (2 in each direction) on both Saturday and Sunday, heading towards Orange County in the morning and towards the Inland Empire in the evening.

== History ==
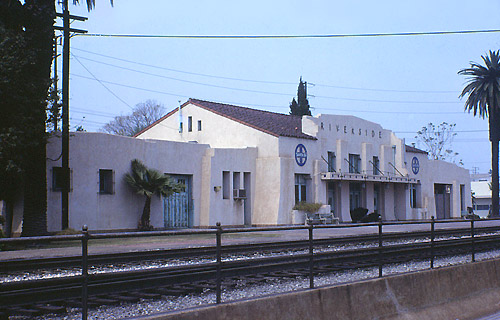
The ex-AT&SF station in 1981

The current station opened for Metrolink Riverside Line service on June 14, 1993. The original Atchison, Topeka and Santa Fe Railway depot (located about 1,000 feet [300 m] to the northeast) closed on May 15, 1968, when the Grand Canyon was re-routed via Pasadena to replace the discontinued Chief. Intercity service at the nearby Union Pacific Railroad station lasted until May 1971.

Inland Empire–Orange County Line service began on October 2, 1995; Riverside was the terminus of that line until the following year when the extension to San Bernardino opened. Amtrak's Southwest Chief began stopping at Riverside in April 2002. Metrolink's 91/Perris Valley Line (then the 91 Line), began operating on May 6, 2002. Riverside was the terminus until the Perris Valley extension opened in 2016.

In December 2012, the station was renamed after Joseph Tavaglione, a local businessman and chair of the California Transportation Commission. The adjacent Vine Street Mobility Hub opened on January 14, 2024, with 16 bus bays for Riverside Transit Agency and Omnitrans. Riverside is a planned stop for the proposed Coachella Valley Rail (CV Rail) service.
