= Riverside–La Sierra station =

Train station in Riverside, California, U.S.

Riverside–La Sierra
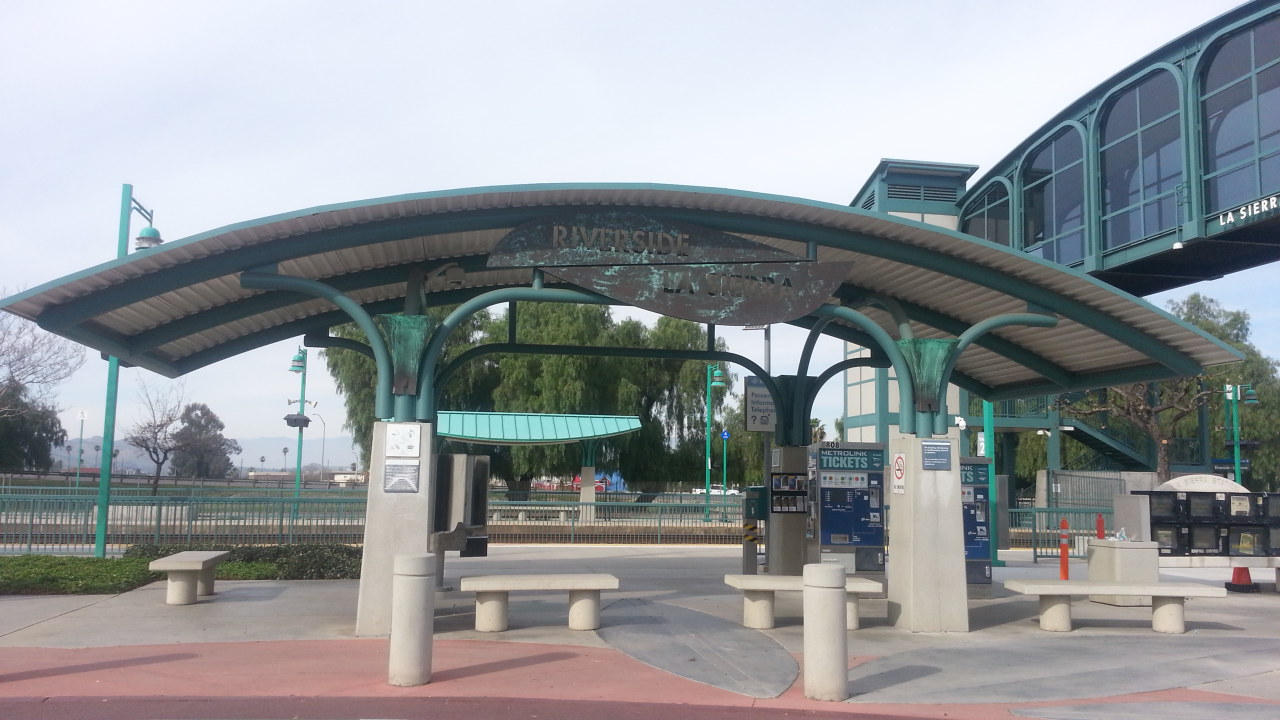

General information
- Location: 10901 Indiana Avenue; Riverside, California 92503
- Coordinates: 33.8999°N 117.4703°W
- Owner: Riverside County Transportation Commission
- Line: BNSF San Bernardino Subdivision
- Platforms: 2 side platforms
- Tracks: 2
- Connections: Bus service; Riverside Transit Agency (RTA); Paratransit; RTA Dial-a-Ride

Construction
- Structure type: At-grade
- Parking: 1,082 spaces
- Accessible: yes

History
- Opened: October 2, 1995

Passengers
- FY 2026: 433 (avg. wkdy boardings)

Services
Preceding station	Metrolink	Following station
Corona–North Main toward L.A. Union Station	91/Perris Valley Line	Riverside–Downtown toward Perris–South
Corona–North Main toward Oceanside	Inland Empire–Orange County Line	Riverside–Downtown toward San Bernardino–Downtown
Location

Riverside–La Sierra station is a Metrolink commuter rail train station in the La Sierra South neighborhood of Riverside, California, United States. Due to its large parking lot, it is the second-largest station served by Metrolink in surface area, after Union Station. La Sierra University is located a few miles from the station.

The station is owned by the Riverside County Transportation Commission (RCTC).

== History ==
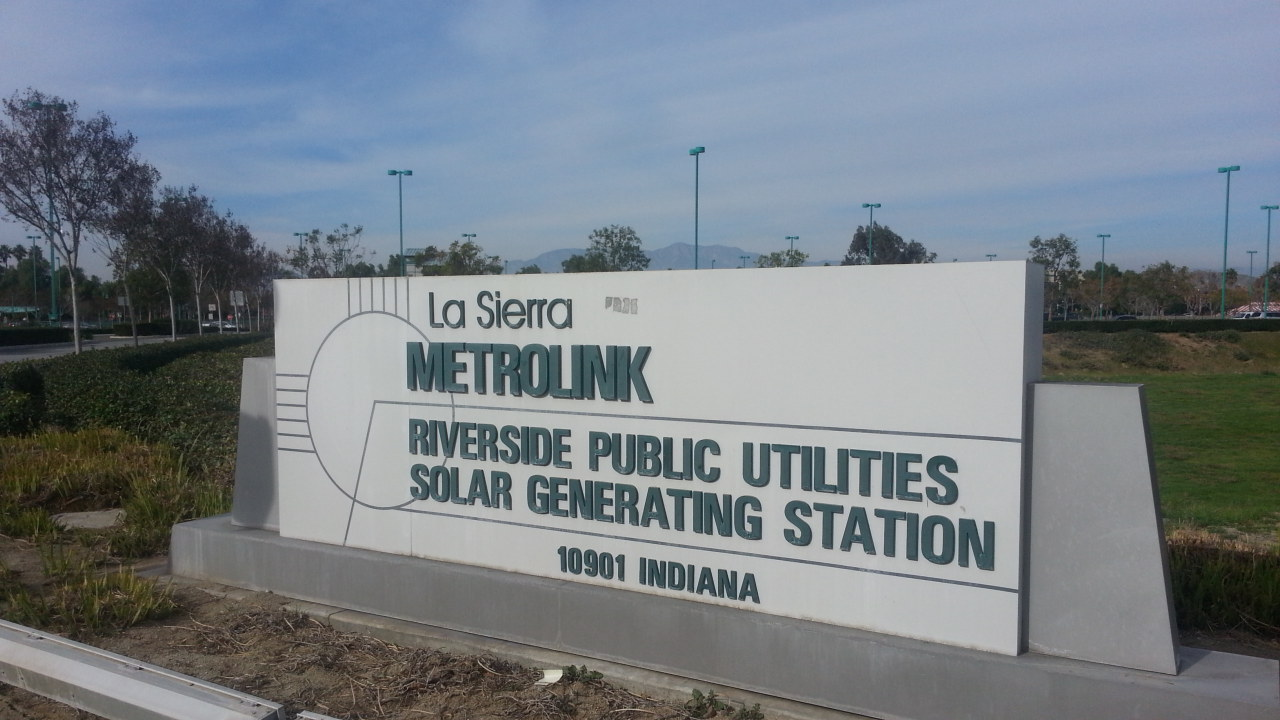

Riverside–La Sierra opened on October 2, 1995 with the opening of the Inland Empire–Orange County (IEOC) Line.

In 2002, Riverside Public Utilities began building a solar covered carport at the station. The carport was completed in 2003.

== Current services ==
=== Rail services ===
Riverside–La Sierra station is served by 14 Metrolink 91/Perris Valley Line trains (7 in each direction) each weekday, running primarily at peak hours in the peak direction of travel. Weekend service consists of 4 trains (2 in each direction) on both Saturday and Sunday, running westbound in the morning and eastbound in the evening.

Additionally, the station is served by 18 Metrolink Inland Empire–Orange County Line trains (9 in each direction) each weekday, running primarily at peak hours in the peak direction of travel. Weekend service consists of 4 trains (2 in each direction) on both Saturday and Sunday, heading towards Orange County in the morning and towards the Inland Empire in the evening.

=== Bus services ===
Riverside Transit Agency Routes 15 (select trips) and 200 stops at the station.

== Future development ==
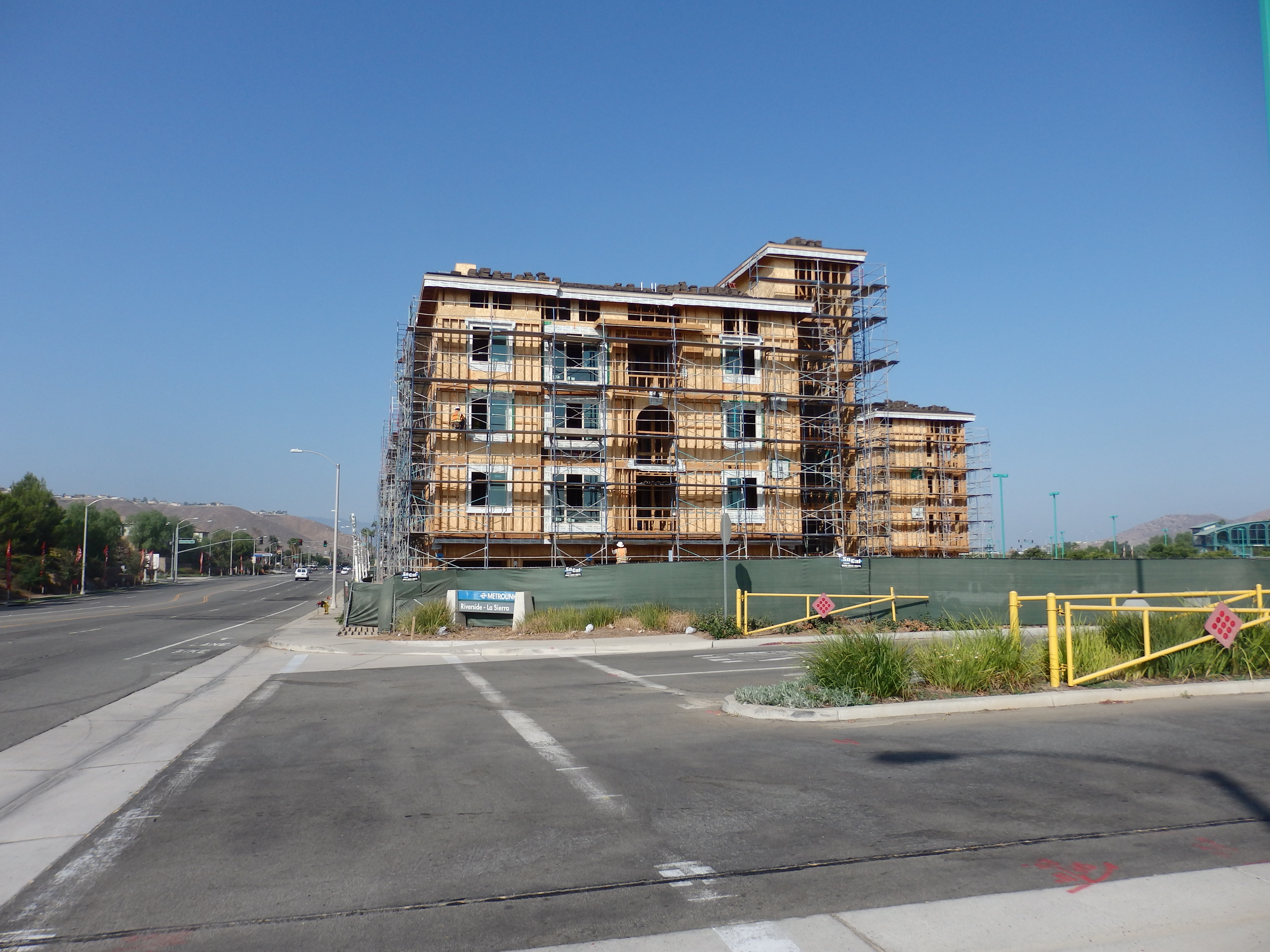
An apartment development under construction at the station in August 2016

RCTC developed plans in the 2000s to build a transit-oriented development (TOD) at the station, enlarge the parking lot, and build improved bus facilities. In 2010, Caltrans granted funds to increase parking capacity at the station. As of 2016, the parking expansion was in the public comment phase, and the TOD apartment complex was under construction.
