= Corona–North Main station =

Train station in Corona, California, U.S.

Corona–North Main
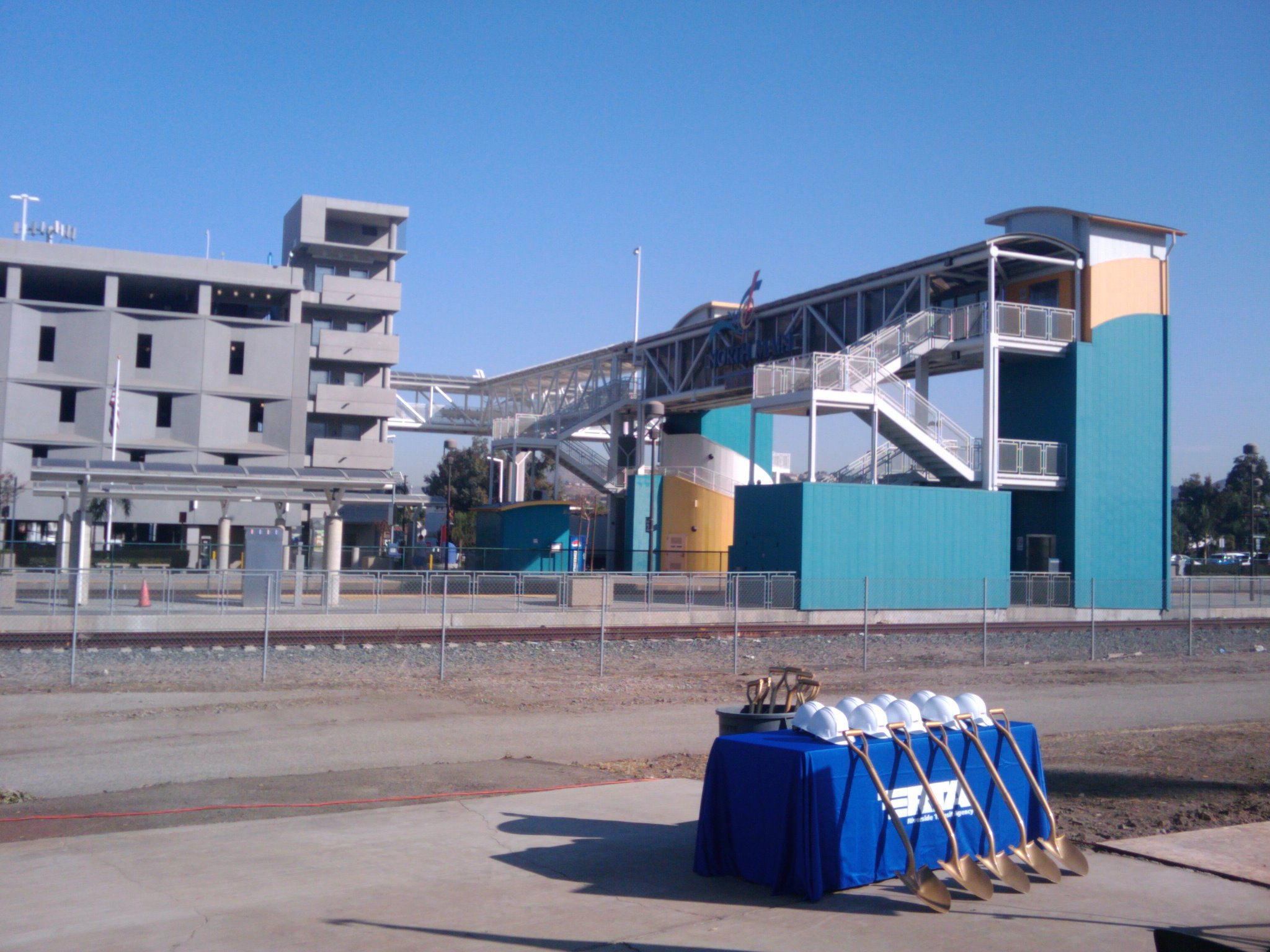
- Corona–North Main station, c. 2009

General information
- Other names: North Main Corona
- Location: 250 East Blaine Street; Corona, California
- Coordinates: 33.8822°N 117.5634°W
- Owner: Riverside County Transportation Commission
- Line: BNSF San Bernardino Subdivision
- Platforms: 1 side platform, 1 island platform (only boards on one side)
- Tracks: 3
- Connections: Riverside Transit Agency: 1, 3, 206; Corona Cruiser: Blue, Red

Construction
- Parking: 500 spaces
- Accessible: Yes

History
- Opened: November 22, 2002

Passengers
- FY 2026: 433 (avg. wkdy boardings)

Services
| Preceding station | Metrolink | Following station |
|---|---|---|
| Corona–West toward L.A. Union Station | 91/Perris Valley Line | Riverside–La Sierra toward Perris–South |
| Corona–West toward Oceanside | Inland Empire–Orange County Line | Riverside–La Sierra toward San Bernardino–Downtown |
Former services
| Preceding station | Atchison, Topeka and Santa Fe Railway | Following station |
|---|---|---|
| Prado toward Los Angeles | Main Line Via Fullerton, Riverside | Arlington toward Chicago |
| Terminus | Corona – Elsinore | Alberhill toward Elsinore |
Location

Corona–North Main station (also called North Main Corona station) is a station on Metrolink's Inland Empire–Orange County and 91/Perris Valley Lines located in Corona, California. The station is located at 250 East Blaine Street, near North Main Street (after which the station is named), and is the second busiest station in the entire Metrolink system. Corona–North Main station consists of two side platforms serving two tracks. A parking lot with 500 spaces is available for passengers.

The station is located near the former Atchison, Topeka and Santa Fe Railway depot, now used as a restaurant and bar.

== Hours and frequency ==
Corona–North Main station is served by 14 Metrolink 91/Perris Valley Line trains (7 in each direction) each weekday, running primarily at peak hours in the peak direction of travel. Weekend service consists of 4 trains (2 in each direction) on both Saturday and Sunday, running westbound in the morning and eastbound in the evening.

Additionally, the station is served by 18 Metrolink Inland Empire–Orange County Line trains (9 in each direction) each weekday, running primarily at peak hours in the peak direction of travel. Weekend service consists of 4 trains (2 in each direction) on both Saturday and Sunday, heading towards Orange County in the morning and towards the Inland Empire in the evening.

== Connections ==
The Corona Transit Center located at the station offers connections to Riverside Transit Agency and the City of Corona's Corona Cruiser buses, all of which are free with a valid Metrolink ticket or pass.

As of May 6, 2025, the following connections are available:

- Corona Cruiser: Blue, Red (Both going only 3 times a day)
- Riverside Transit Agency: 1, 3, 206
