= Jurupa Valley/Pedley station =

Train station in Jurupa Valley, California, US

Jurupa Valley/Pedley
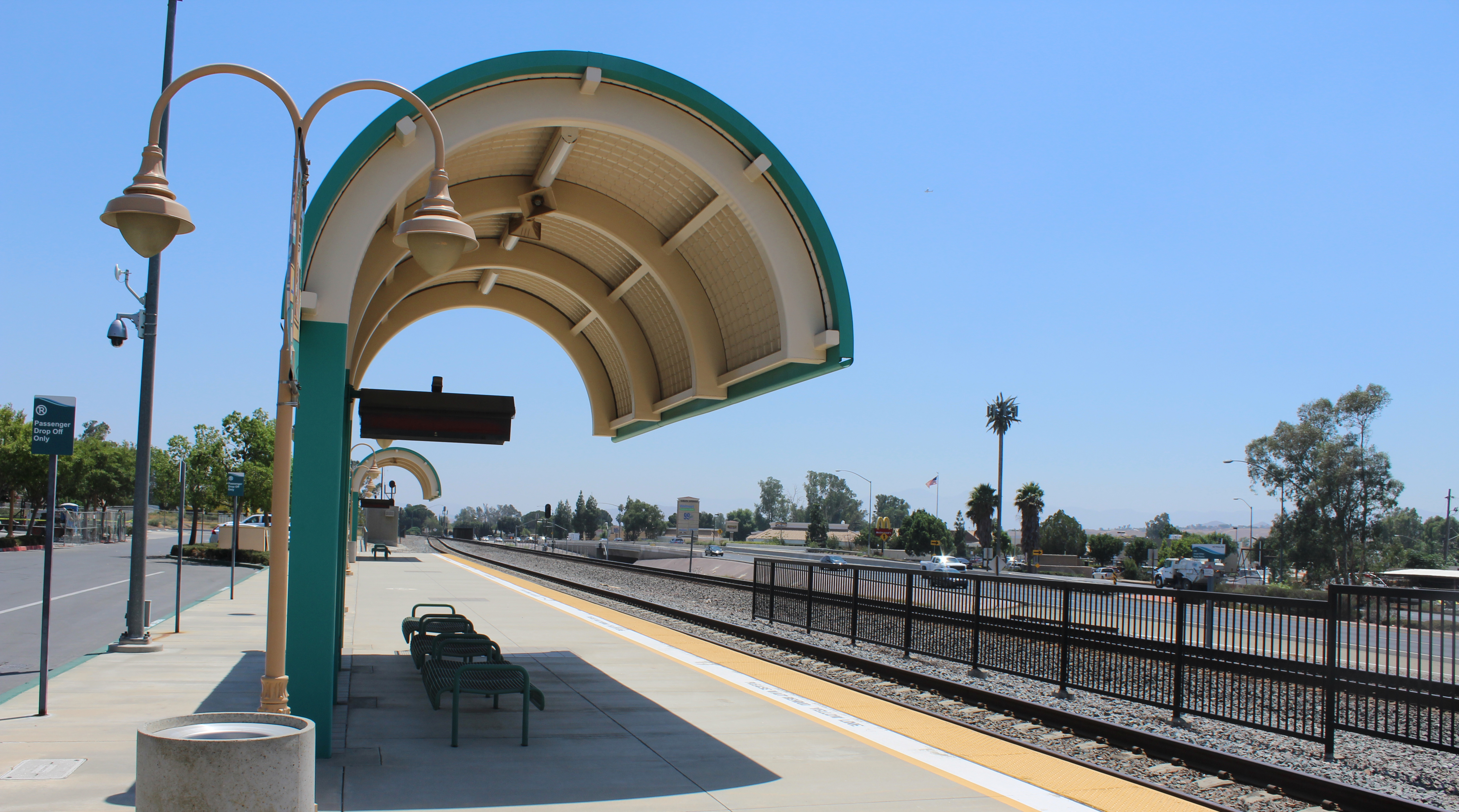
- Jurupa Valley/Pedley station platform in 2017

General information
- Location: 6001 Pedley Road; Jurupa Valley, California
- Coordinates: 33.9779°N 117.4762°W
- Owner: Riverside County Transportation Commission
- Line: UP Los Angeles Subdivision
- Platforms: 1 side platform, 1 island platform (only boards on one side)
- Tracks: 2
- Connections: Riverside Transit Agency: 21, 29

Construction
- Structure type: Grade-level
- Parking: 283 spaces
- Cycle facilities: Racks and lockers
- Accessible: Yes

History
- Opened: June 14, 1993
- Former names: Pedley

Passengers
- FY 2026: 59 (avg. wkdy boardings)

Services
Preceding station	Metrolink	Following station
Ontario–East toward L.A. Union Station	Riverside Line	Riverside–Downtown Terminus
Location

Jurupa Valley/Pedley station (formerly Pedley station) is a Metrolink train station in the Pedley neighborhood in Jurupa Valley, California, United States. Metrolink's Riverside Line trains between Los Angeles Union Station and Riverside–Downtown station stop here.

It is located just east of Van Buren Boulevard and just north of Limonite Avenue, and has 283 parking spaces. The station is owned by the Riverside County Transportation Commission. Riverside Transit Agency bus routes 21 and 29 also serve the station.

Jurupa Valley/Pedley station is served by 10 Metrolink Riverside Line trains (5 in each direction) each weekday, running primarily at peak hours in the peak direction of travel. There is no service on weekends.

The station was renamed from Pedley to Jurupa Valley/Pedley station on October 3, 2016, to reflect Jurupa Valley's 2011 incorporation as a city.
