= Moreno Valley/March Field station =

Train station in Riverside County, California, U.S.

Moreno Valley/March Field
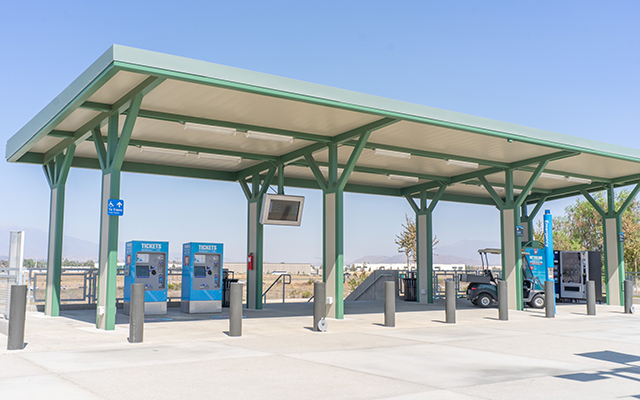
- Moreno Valley/March Field station entry area

General information
- Location: 14160 Meridian Parkway; Riverside, California; United States
- Coordinates: 33.9133°N 117.2878°W
- Owner: Riverside County Transportation Commission
- Line: SCRRA Perris Valley Subdivision
- Platforms: 2 side platforms
- Tracks: 2
- Connections: Riverside Transit Agency: 20

Construction
- Parking: 528 spaces, 24 accessible spaces
- Cycle facilities: Racks and lockers
- Accessible: Yes

History
- Opened: June 6, 2016; 10 years ago

Passengers
- FY 2026: 119 (avg. wkdy boardings)

Services
Preceding station	Metrolink	Following station
Riverside–Hunter Park/UCR toward L.A. Union Station	91/Perris Valley Line	Perris–Downtown toward Perris–South
Location

Moreno Valley/March Field is a train station in unincorporated Riverside County, California, United States, near Moreno Valley and the March Air Reserve Base, after which the station is named. It opened on June 6, 2016, as part of the extension of the 91/Perris Valley Line of the Metrolink commuter rail system. The station was renovated between October 2022 and July 2025 to add a second platform.

== Services ==
Moreno Valley/March Field station is served by 14 Metrolink 91/Perris Valley Line trains (7 in each direction) each weekday, running primarily at peak hours in the peak direction of travel. Weekend service consists of 4 trains (2 in each direction) on both Saturday and Sunday, running westbound in the morning and eastbound in the evening.
