= Riverside–Hunter Park/UCR station =

Train station in Riverside, California, U.S.

Riverside–Hunter Park/UCR
- Metrolink train at Riverside–Hunter Park/UCR station platform

General information
- Location: 1101 Marlborough Avenue; Riverside, California; United States
- Coordinates: 33.9981°N 117.3345°W
- Owner: Riverside County Transportation Commission
- Line: SCRRA Perris Valley Subdivision
- Platforms: 1 side platform
- Tracks: 1
- Connections: Riverside Transit Agency: 13 56

Construction
- Parking: 476 spaces, 23 accessible spaces
- Cycle facilities: Racks and lockers
- Accessible: Yes

History
- Opened: June 6, 2016; 10 years ago
- Former names: Riverside–Hunter Park

Passengers
- FY 2026: 88 (avg. wkdy boardings)

Services
Preceding station	Metrolink	Following station
Riverside–Downtown toward L.A. Union Station	91/Perris Valley Line	Moreno Valley/March Field toward Perris–South
Location

Riverside–Hunter Park/UCR station is a train station in Riverside, California, United States, that opened on June 6, 2016, along with the 91/Perris Valley Line extension of the Metrolink commuter rail system. It is located in the Hunter Park neighborhood of Riverside and about 3 miles (4.8 km) north of the campus of the University of California, Riverside, after which the station is named. To reach the campus, students may take Riverside Transit Agency route 56, or use Riverside-Downtown and take Riverside Transit Agency route 1.

Riverside–Hunter Park/UCR station is served by 14 Metrolink 91/Perris Valley Line trains (7 in each direction) each weekday, running primarily at peak hours in the peak direction of travel. Weekend service consists of 4 trains (2 in each direction) on both Saturday and Sunday, running westbound in the morning and eastbound in the evening.

== History ==
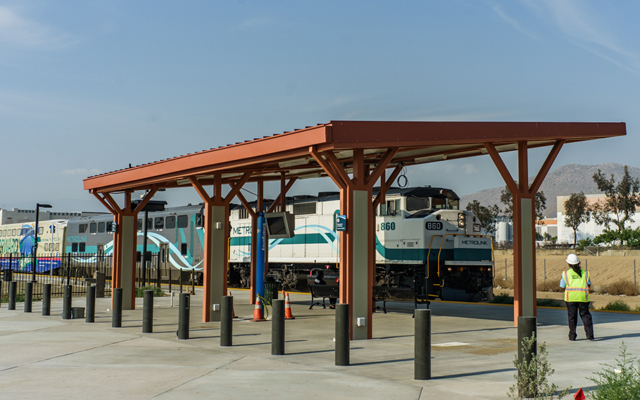
A Metrolink train at the Riverside-Hunter Park/UCR station platform in 2016

The station was proposed as part of the 91/Perris Valley Line extension. Original plans for the extension called for an additional three stations: one along Fair Isle Drive in Riverside, one north of Interstate 215 (California), and one on Cajalco Road west of the interstate, but they were removed due to complaints from local residents. The Riverside-Hunter Park/UCR station was originally going to be adjacent to the campus, but it was moved to the Hunter Park neighborhood after local residents raised concerns about parking and noise.

Construction on the extension broke ground on February 21, 2014 and the station opened on June 6, 2016 along with the rest of the extension. Initially there were no direct bus routes to campus. However, in February of 2023, Riverside Transit Agency route 56, a loop terminating at the station, was opened, providing a direct connection to the campus.
