= Perris station (Atchison, Topeka and Santa Fe Railway) =

- Perris Depot
- U.S. National Register of Historic Places
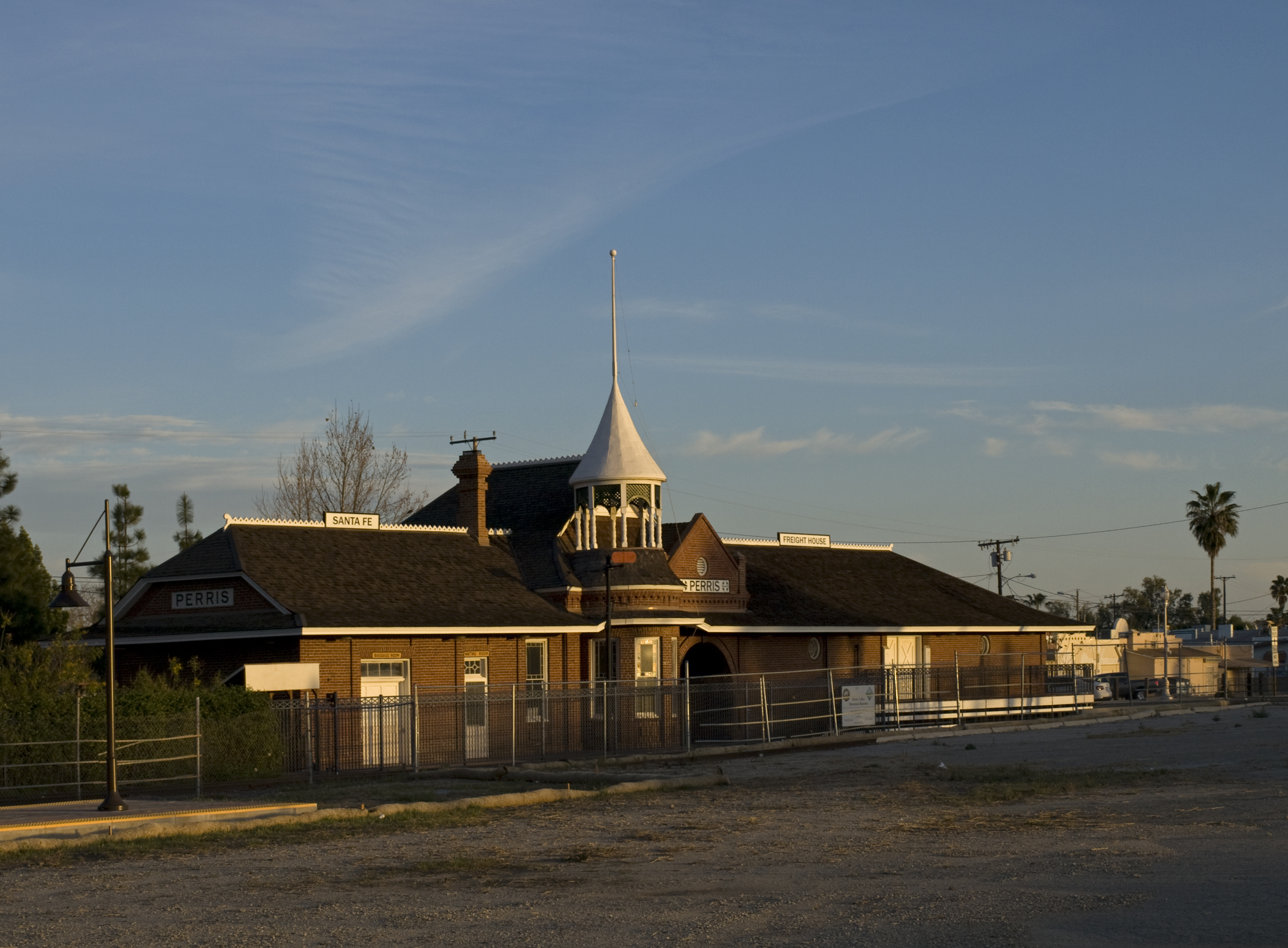

- Location within California Location within the United States
- Location: 120 W. Fourth St., Perris, California
- Coordinates: 33°46′25″N 117°13′44″W
- Area: less than one acre
- Built: 1892
- Architect: Benjamin Franklin Levet Sr.
- Architectural style: Queen Anne
- NRHP reference No.: 94000819
- Added to NRHP: August 5, 1994

The Perris Depot is a railroad depot built in 1892 to serve Perris, California. The station replaced a previous wooden structure at the same site on the Atchison, Topeka and Santa Fe Railway line, originally the California Southern Railroad.

== History ==
The station was built by J.W. Nance, a Perris developer, and was designed by Benjamin Franklin Levet Sr., son-in-law to Fred T. Perris. The depot served both passenger traffic and the considerable agricultural traffic associated with the farmlands of the Perris Valley. However, passenger traffic declined and ended in 1947. Agriculture declined due to limited water supplies and salinization, and farms were replaced with suburbs. All but one track in the station yard was abandoned in 1975. From 1974 the depot has been used by the Perris Valley Historical and Museum Association as a museum of local history. In the 1990s the depot was proposed as a commuter rail station.

== Description ==
The red brick depot is in the Queen Anne style, with a conical-roofed turret, round windows and an arched entry. The depot is a one-story structure, generally rectangular in plan, with a raised central mass at right angles to the plan with flanking wings. The central mass features an arched entry on one side and a projecting round bay with a cupola opposite. The brick gables are partly hipped, with prominent "PERRIS" signs on each. A comb-like finial decorates the ridge of the central roof mass and wings, with "SANTA FE" signs facing either platform.

== Present use ==
The Perris Depot is used by the Orange Empire Railway Museum as a terminus for its excursion train line. The depot was renovated in 2007–2008. The building is now home to the Perris Valley Historical Museum.

The Perris Multimodal Transit Center was opened in 2010 adjacent to the depot, with bus and Metrolink train service. The Metrolink 91/Perris Valley Line extension through Perris was completed in June 2016 and stops at the adjacent Perris–Downtown station. The museum continues to operate in the depot.

The depot was placed on the National Register of Historic Places in 1994.

Preceding station	Atchison, Topeka and Santa Fe Railway	Following station
Ethanac toward San Jacinto	San Jacinto Branch	Val Verde toward San Bernardino
