= Galleria at Tyler =

Shopping mall in Riverside, California

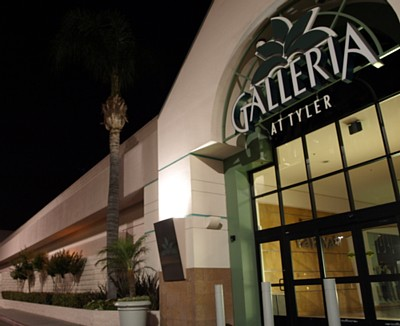
- Northeastern entrance to Galleria at Tyler
- Location: Riverside, California
- Coordinates: 33.91021°N 117.45758°W
- Address: 1299 Galleria at Tyler Riverside, California 92503
- Opened: October 12, 1970; 56 years ago
- Previous names: Tyler Mall
- Developer: The Hahn Company
- Manager: GGP
- Owner: GGP
- Num. of stores: 185 (as of 2018)
- Num. of anchor tenants: 4
- Floor area: 1,200,000 sq ft (110,000 m^{2})
- Floors: 2 (3 in Furniture City)
- Parking: 5,700
- Website: galleriatyler.com

Galleria at Tyler is a shopping mall located in Riverside, California, United States, that features 170 stores, with major stores including JCPenney, and Macy's, in addition to Terrace Cafe and an AMC Theatres.

== History ==
Opening as Tyler Mall, the mall opened on October 12, 1970, as a one-story, two-anchor (J. C. Penney and The Broadway) retail destination for the steadily-growing Inland Empire.

In 1973, May Company California opened as an anchor store.

Tyler Mall underwent its first renovation in 1991 with a second story, Nordstrom as its third anchor tenant and reopening as the Galleria at Tyler.

2006 and 2007 saw the mall's second expansion with an increased focus on restaurant out-parcels. The Cheesecake Factory and P. F. Chang's China Bistro opened in 2006 with Yard House following in 2007. AMC Theatres and Robbins Brothers opened that year as well.

On December 6, 2015, three men with sledgehammers and axes entered Ben Bridge Jeweler near J. C. Penney. They smashed glass display cases and stole thousands of dollars' worth of jewelry. This happened just four days after the 2015 San Bernardino attack. Distant shoppers mistook the sound of smashing glass for gunshots. The first 9-1-1 calls came in at around 6:30 p.m; over 100 police officers and SWAT team members arrived due to initial belief it was an active shooting. Shoppers were allowed to exit an hour later after officers searched the mall. All suspects have been caught.

In 2020, the Nordstrom anchor store closed, as a result of the economic impact of the COVID-19 pandemic. In August 2022, Furniture City opened in the former Nordstrom anchor store. On March 21, 2025, it was announced that the Forever 21 store would close, when the chain folded. In December 2025, Furniture City was announced to be closing in 2026 with a closing sale that lasted for 5 months before its closure on May 31 of that year.

== Anchor stores ==
=== Current ===
- J. C. Penney (1970–present)
- Macy's (north building: 1996–2006, south building: 2006-present)

=== Former ===
- The Broadway (1970-1996, replaced with north building Macy's) - opened with 156,000 square feet (14,500 m^{2}) of selling space, Charles Luckman and Associates, architects
- May Company California (1973-1993, replaced with Robinsons-May)
- Robinsons-May (1993-2006, replaced with south building Macy's)
- Nordstrom (1991-2020, replaced with Furniture City)
- Forever 21 (2011–2025, replaced north building Macy's, currently vacant)
- Furniture City (2022–2026, replaced Nordstrom, currently vacant)
