= Corona–West station =

Commuter rail station in Corona, California

Corona–West
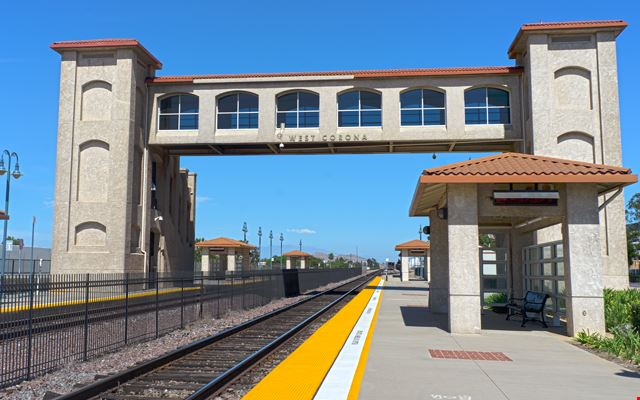
- Corona–West station platform with pedestrian bridge in the distance

General information
- Other names: West Corona
- Location: 155 South Auto Center Drive; Corona, California; United States
- Coordinates: 33°53′09″N 117°36′49″W
- Owner: Riverside County Transportation Commission
- Line: BNSF Railway San Bernardino Subdivision
- Platforms: 2 side platforms
- Tracks: 2

Construction
- Parking: 564 spaces, 14 accessible spaces
- Cycle facilities: Racks and lockers
- Accessible: Yes

History
- Opened: October 2, 1995

Passengers
- FY 2026: 327 (avg. wkdy boardings)

Services
Preceding station	Metrolink	Following station
Fullerton toward L.A. Union Station	91/Perris Valley Line	Corona–North Main toward Perris–South
Anaheim Canyon toward Oceanside	Inland Empire–Orange County Line	Corona–North Main toward San Bernardino–Downtown
Location

Corona–West station (also called West Corona station) is a Metrolink station in Corona, California on the 91/Perris Valley and Inland Empire–Orange County lines. The station is located at 155 South Auto Center Drive. Like all Metrolink stations in Riverside County, this station is owned by the Riverside County Transportation Commission.

== Hours and frequency ==
Corona–West station is served by 14 Metrolink 91/Perris Valley Line trains (7 in each direction) each weekday, running primarily at peak hours in the peak direction of travel. Weekend service consists of 4 trains (2 in each direction) on both Saturday and Sunday, running westbound in the morning and eastbound in the evening.

Additionally, the station is served by 18 Metrolink Inland Empire–Orange County Line trains (9 in each direction) each weekday, running primarily at peak hours in the peak direction of travel. Weekend service consists of 4 trains (2 in each direction) on both Saturday and Sunday, heading towards Orange County in the morning and towards the Inland Empire in the evening.
