= Perris–Downtown station =

Transit center in Perris, California, U.S.

Perris–Downtown
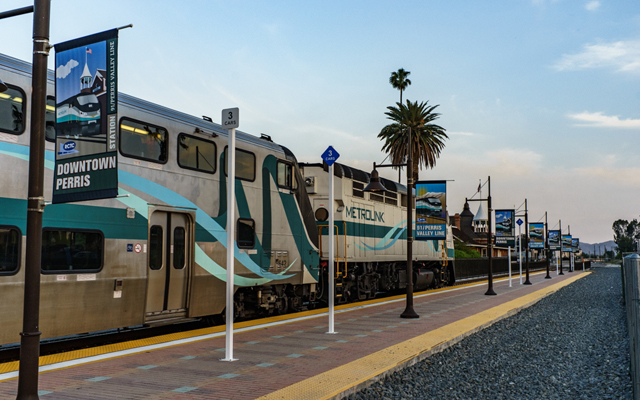

General information
- Other names: Perris Transit Center; Downtown Perris
- Location: 121 South C Street; Perris, California; United States
- Coordinates: 33.7846°N 117.2294°W
- Owner: Riverside County Transportation Commission
- Line: SCRRA Perris Valley Subdivision
- Bus routes: Riverside Transit Agency: 9, 19, 22, 27, 28, 30, 61,
- Bus stands: 8

Construction
- Parking: 907 spaces, 28 accessible spaces
- Accessible: Yes

History
- Opened: January 11, 2010; 16 years ago (bus); June 6, 2016; 10 years ago (rail)
- Former names: Perris Multimodal Transit Center (2010–2015); Downtown Perris (2016–2018)

Passengers
- FY 2026: 133 (avg. wkdy boardings)

Services
Preceding station	Metrolink	Following station
Moreno Valley/March Field toward L.A. Union Station	91/Perris Valley Line	Perris–South Terminus
Location

Perris–Downtown station, (also known as Perris Transit Center and Downtown Perris station), is a transit center in Perris, California, that opened on January 11, 2010, with an eight-bay bus platform used by the Riverside Transit Agency. Train service to the station began on June 6, 2016, with the 91/Perris Valley Line extension of the Metrolink commuter rail system. It is located near the historic Perris Depot.

== Station history ==
From 1892 to 1947, passenger service was provided by the Atchison, Topeka and Santa Fe Railway. Service ceased due to decrease in ridership. Freight service continued on the line until development replaced the farmland in the area. Proposals to return passenger service to Perris were first proposed in the 1990s

Planning was formalized in the form of an commuter rail station in the early 2010s. The bus portion of the station opened in January 2010, at the time, rail service was to start in late 2011, this was later postponed indefinitely. The rail plan was approved on January 16, 2013 At the time, it was reported that service would start in 2014, but that was pushed back by nearly two years. Train service finally began on June 6, 2016, marking the first regularly scheduled passenger train to arrive in Perris in nearly 59 years.

== Services ==
=== Rail ===
Perris–Downtown station is served by 14 Metrolink 91/Perris Valley Line trains (7 in each direction) each weekday, running primarily at peak hours in the peak direction of travel. Weekend service consists of 4 trains (2 in each direction) on both Saturday and Sunday, running westbound in the morning and eastbound in the evening.

In addition to the main platform, a track pocket will be constructed to allow trains from the Southern California Railway Museum to turn around. Construction will begin when funding permits.

=== Bus ===
The Riverside Transit Agency (RTA), which operates a network of buses around the Inland Empire, uses the eight bay bus platform at the station as a regional hub. As of October 3, 2022 the station is served by RTA routes 9, 19, 22, 27, 28, 30, 61
