= Robbins Brothers =

Robbins Bros. Jewelry, Inc.
- Company type: Private
- Industry: Retail Jewelry
- Founded: Seattle, Washington, U.S. (1921, incorporated 1993)
- Headquarters: Azusa, California, USA
- Key people: Andy Heyneman(CEO); Skip Robbins; Steve Robbins
- Website: www.robbinsbrothers.com

Robbins Bros. Jewelry, Inc. is a California-based jewelry store specializing in engagement rings. Robbins Brothers describes itself as “the engagement ring store.”

== History ==
In 1921 Robbins Brothers opened its first store in Seattle, Washington. The first store, Ben Tipp Diamonds was founded by Ben Tipp. Ben Tipp’s son, Eugene Robbins, later purchased a new store, William Pitt Jewelers located in Pasadena, California. Eugene Robins’ two sons, Skip and Steve later took over management of the company.

In 1993, the retailer changed its name to "Robbins Bros., The Engagement Ring Store.” From 1993-2003 Robbins Bros created a series of advertisements, particularly the “non-ad” radio commercials starring Skip and Steve Robbins, that allowed them to obtain 21% market share of jewelry by 2003.

In 2009 the company closed all of its Chicago stores.

At the start of 2013, the company had eight California locations and four Texas locations, for a total of 12 retail stores. On May 29, 2013, Robbins Brothers, The Engagement Ring Store announced that it had purchased all the assets of Washington based E.E. Robbins, adding the two Seattle based stores to the Robbins Brothers chain. As of June 2013, Robbins Brothers had a total of 14 retail locations. In 2015, another Robbins Brothers location opened in Scottsdale, Arizona.

In November 2025, a Robbins Brothers location opens in Pasadena, California, located in the Playhouse District at the corner of Colorado Boulevard and Madison Avenue.

== Business ==
Robbins Brothers is most recognized for its radio ads styled in a "non-ad" format of “consumer messages written in the vulnerable, candid style of a conversation between close friends” These advertisements have won national awards, and received praise from industry publications as seen in the Entrepreneur Magazine article spotlighting Robbins Brothers unique approach. In 2007, Robbins Brothers began offering engagement planning services. The engagement planning services have been labeled business publications as "good karma marketing".
