= Promenade Temecula =

Regional shopping mall in Temecula, California, United States

- Location: Temecula, California, United States
- Coordinates: 33°31′30″N 117°9′15″W
- Address: 40820 Winchester Road
- Opened: October 27, 1999
- Developer: Forest City Enterprises
- Manager: GGP
- Owner: GGP
- Num. of stores: 163
- Num. of anchor tenants: 6
- Floor area: 1,400,000 sq ft (130,000 m^{2})
- Floors: 2 (1 in Edward's Cinemas, Round One Entertainment, and Dick's Sporting Goods, 3 in West Parking Garage, 5 in East Parking Garage)
- Website: www.promenadetemecula.com

Promenade Temecula, formerly The Promenade in Temecula, is an enclosed shopping mall in Temecula, California. Opened on October 27, 1999, its anchor tenants are J. C. Penney, Macy's which occupies two anchor spots: Macy's North (which was a former Robinsons-May) and Macy's South (which preceded North), Round One Entertainment, Edwards Cinema, and Dick's Sporting Goods.

== History ==
Promenade Temecula opened on October 27, 1999, with three department stores: JCPenney, Robinsons-May, and Sears. Macy's opened in 2002 alongside a new concourse of shops. The Macy's and the additional stores occupied space originally set aside for an ice skating rink on the south side of the 766,500-square-foot (71,210 m^{2}) mall, which never came to fruition. In 2008, Macy's acquired the former Robinsons-May location, which on June 14 began operating as the Macy's Men's, Children, and Home store. The original location became a Macy's Women's only store.

In 2009, a number of developments helped transform the Promenade. Two new parking garages were built between the Edwards Theatres and Macy's, and between them, a row of shops called "The Shops on Promenade Drive" was added, with a new entrance through the JCPenney wing with shops and restaurants such as White House Black Market, Apple, P.F. Chang's, LOFT, MAC, Chico's, Soma Intimates, Sleep Number, Lazy Dog Restaurant & Bar, Coach, Yard House, Pottery Barn, Williams Sonoma, The Walking Company, and Lucille's Smokehouse Bar-B-Que. This section of the mall officially opened on March 26, 2009.

In 2011, plans to track cell phones starting Black Friday of that year were planned, by using GPS data via a system developed by company Path Intelligence. These plans were cancelled after Senator Chuck Schumer raised privacy concerns.

In 2015, Sears Holdings spun off 235 of its properties, including the Sears at Promenade Temecula, into Seritage Growth Properties.

On November 7, 2019, it was announced that Sears would be closing this location a part of a plan to close 96 stores nationwide. The store closed in February 2020. The first floor is currently occupied by Round One Entertainment. The second floor of the Sears space was converted to Dick's Sporting Goods, which opened in April 2022.

== Future developments ==
In 2016, the city of Temecula approved a "multi-million" dollar renovation project for the property. Plans are for a two-story open-air plaza to cut though the Macy's wing in the southwestern corner of the property. In addition, the plan includes construction of two new restaurants to be built in what is currently the parking lot west of Macy's south building. One of the restaurants, The Cheesecake Factory, opened on November 20, 2018; however, no timeline has been announced for the rest of the project.
