= Hemet Valley Mall =

Shopping mall in Riverside county, California

- Location: W. Florida Avenue (California State Route 74) between N. Kirby Street & N. Gilmore Street
- Coordinates: 33.7487°N 116.9957°W
- Address: 2200 W. Florida Avenue, Hemet, California 92545
- Opened: October 15, 1980
- Owner: M.C. Strauss Company
- Num. of stores: 10+
- Num. of anchor tenants: 3 (2 open, 1 vacant)
- Floors: 1
- Website: thehemetvalleymall.com

Hemet Valley Mall is a small enclosed shopping mall in Hemet, California. It is located on West Florida Avenue (California State Route 74) between North Kirby Street and North Gilmore Street. It is anchored by JCPenney and Hobby Lobby, with one vacant anchor last occupied by Sears.

The mall, which cost $10 million to build, opened on October 15, 1980, with 200,000 square feet (19,000 m^{2}) of retail space. When it opened it was anchored by a 50,400-square-foot (4,680 m^{2}), $1.8-million Harris Company department store (later becoming Harris-Gottschalks in 1999) and a J.C. Penney, plus 40 specialty shops. Sears was then annexed to the mall in 1998, having relocated from standalone store. Gottschalks closed in 2009 due to bankruptcy and was first replaced by Forever 21, and later Hobby Lobby. Sears closed in 2020 as a part of a plan to close 40 stores nationwide.
