= 91/Perris Valley Line =

Commuter rail line in Southern California

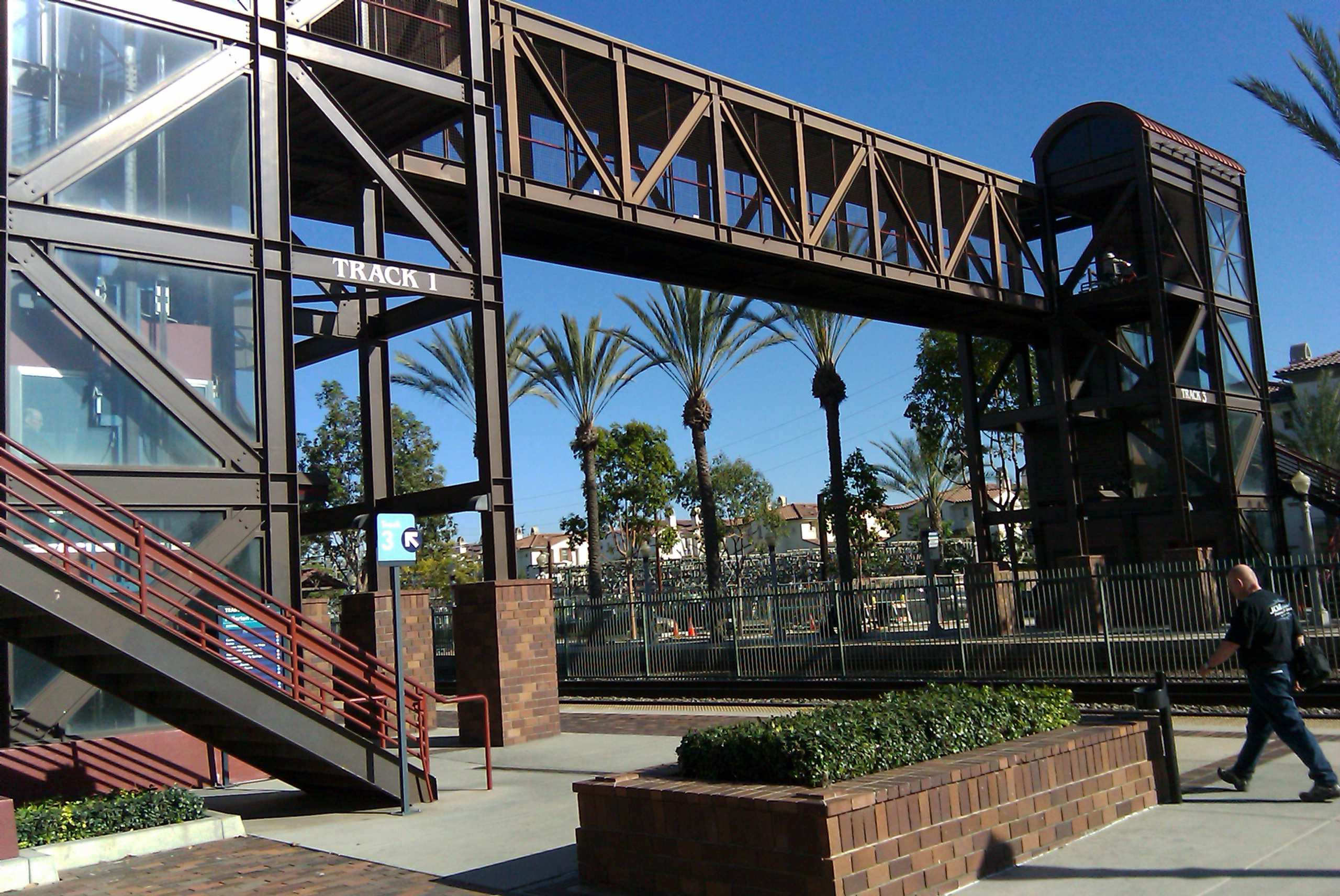
- Pedestrian bridge and tracks at the Fullerton station

Overview
- Locale: Southern California
- Termini: L.A. Union Station; Perris–South
- Stations: 12

Service
- Type: Commuter rail
- System: Metrolink
- Operator: Metrolink
- Daily ridership: 2,605 (weekdays, Q3 2025)

History
- Opened: May 6, 2002 (as 91 Line)
- Extended from Riverside to Perris–South and renamed 91/Perris Valley Line: July 16, 2016

Technical
- Line length: 83.8 miles (134.9 km)
- Character: Elevated and surface-level
- Track gauge: 4 ft 8 1/2 in (1,435 mm) standard gauge
- Operating speed: 33 mph (53 km/h) (avg. Q4 2015-16)
Route map
91/Perris Valley Line highlighted in blue

The 91/Perris Valley Line, formerly known as the 91 Line, is a commuter rail route operated by Metrolink that runs from Los Angeles to Perris in Southern California, United States, mostly paralleling State Route 91 between Riverside-Downtown and Buena Park stations. Operating since May 2002, the route runs on the Southern Transcon line owned by BNSF Railway, as well as the Riverside County Transportation Commission-owned San Jacinto Branch Line. Services are primarily operated along the entire route between L.A. Union Station and Perris–South.

== History ==
Service on the 91 Line began on May 6, 2002, between Union Station and Riverside–Downtown. Metrolink began operating limited weekend service on the 91 Line in July 2014. Originally, it started production in the late 19th and early 20th centuries. In 1882 the Southern Pacific Railroad (SP) built a line between Los Angeles and Riverside County. It was first built to grow crops and agricultural regions. In 2002, the Riverside County Transportation Commission (RCTC) started efforts to restore commuter rail services along this line

=== Weekend service ===
The Metrolink 91/Perris Valley Line weekend service began on October 19, 2019 between Perris-South Metrolink Station and Los Angeles Union Station, and consists of 2 round trip trains (one-way to L.A. in the morning and one-way back to Perris in the afternoon and evening).

=== Extension ===
The Perris Valley Line is a 24-mile-long extension of the original 91 Line into the Perris Valley. The extension runs on the San Jacinto Branch Line, which parallels Interstate 215.

The Riverside County Transportation Commission (RCTC) purchased the BNSF San Jacinto Branch Line in 1993, soon after Metrolink began operating. Planning for the extension formally began in 2002. After studying the service alternatives available for the Perris Valley, RCTC selected commuter rail service in 2004. The Federal Transit Administration provided funding for the extension in 2007. In 2009, both the Federal Transit Administration and RCTC decided to conduct further studies into the project. The Federal Transit Administration decided to require a Supplemental Environmental Assessment (SEA) to refresh the 2004 information and to obtain new public comment. RCTC had decided to prepare a full draft environmental impact report (EIR) to clarify concerns and address new station site options. The draft EIR was released for public comment on April 5, 2010, with the public comment period closing on May 24, 2010. The draft SEA was completed and the comment period for the SEA ended on January 6, 2011. As of October 2012, comments received on both the EIR and the SEA were under review.

Seven stations were originally planned by RCTC—five to open along with the extension, and two to be built in the future. In the April 2010 CEQA-mandated environmental impact report, three stations were dropped: the two future stations, one on the Cajalco Expressway near its junction with Interstate 215 in Perris and one in Box Springs within Riverside; and a station adjacent to UC Riverside, which was removed due to complaints by local residents. In response to these removals, RCTC officials stated that more stations could be built in the future if necessary. A local community group filed a CEQA lawsuit against the extension in 2011; the group and RCTC settled the suit in 2013.

Led by RCTC, construction on the extension began in October 2013. Originally planned to start in December 2015, public service on the extension was delayed to February 2016, then March 2016, then scheduled for sometime in the spring. The delay had been attributed to construction of the Perris–South station. After numerous delays, the extension opened June 6, 2016. Metrolink inconsistently uses the terms "91/Perris Valley Line" and "91 Line" to refer to both the extension and the entire rail line.

The extension was projected to cost $248 million with funding coming from the state, a $75 million grant from the Federal Transit Administration, and Measure A, Riverside County's special sales tax for transportation projects.

== Future development ==
In 2005, an RCTC-commissioned study determined that extending the line to San Jacinto via an underused rail line owned by RCTC, and/or to Temecula via a brand-new trackage, would be feasible.

In April 2023, $15.5 million in funding was allocated by the state following a joint application between Metrolink and the Riverside County Transportation Committee (RCTC) for a double-track project along Metrolink’s 91/Perris Valley Line between the cities of Moreno Valley and Perris.

Construction of an infill station in Placentia is planned, but has been delayed due to a lack of cooperation from BNSF, who owns the right-of-way.

Los Angeles Metro also plans to relocate Commerce station along the Orange County Line to the city of Pico Rivera. The new station will be a full-time stop along both the Orange County Line and the 91/Perris Valley Line. The California High-Speed Rail Authority initially proposed slightly relocating the station to a new location at Maple Avenue, north of Telegraph Road, due to severe physical, operational, and safety conflicts along the LOSSAN Corridor right of way, which it plans to utilize between its Burbank Airport station and the Anaheim Regional Transportation Intermodal Center. However, on February 23, 2023, LA Metro's board of directors unanimously approved a motion to instead conduct a feasibility study into relocating the station somewhere in Pico Rivera. On March 26, 2026, the LA Metro board of directors unanimously approved a motion accepting the results of the feasibility study and to direct staff towards advancing the station into 30% preliminary engineering, site layout design, and CEQA/NEPA environmental review. On October 22, 2026, the LA Metro board of directors unanimously approved a motion allocating up to $6 million in capital seed funding to advance the goals in the previous motion.

In 2024, RCTC, announced the construction of a infill station located in Mead Valley. Construction is expected to begin in late 2025 and open in 2029. RCTC is slating to begin construction on a project to modernize and double-track the portion of the 91/PV from Moreno Valley March Field station to Perris–Downtown station in late 2027.

RCTC's 2024 Traffic Relief Plan also calls for a Metrolink station in Winchester to serve Menifee.

== Stations ==
There are twelve stations on the 91/Perris Valley Line:

Station	Connections	Location	
L.A. Union Station	Metrolink: Antelope Valley Orange County Riverside San Bernardino Ventura County; Amtrak: Coast Starlight, Pacific Surfliner, Southwest Chief, Sunset Limited, Texas Eagle; Metro: A Line B Line D Line J Line; FlyAway to LAX	Los Angeles	Los Angeles County
Norwalk/Santa Fe Springs	Metrolink: Orange County	Norwalk	Los Angeles County
Buena Park	Metrolink: Orange County	Buena Park	Orange County
Fullerton	Metrolink: Orange County; Amtrak: Pacific Surfliner, Southwest Chief	Fullerton	Orange County
Corona–West	Metrolink: Inland Empire–Orange County	Corona	Riverside County
Corona–North Main	Metrolink: Inland Empire–Orange County	Corona	Riverside County
Riverside–La Sierra	Metrolink: Inland Empire–Orange County	Riverside	Riverside County
Riverside–Downtown	Metrolink: Inland Empire–Orange County Riverside; Amtrak: Southwest Chief	Riverside	Riverside County
Riverside–Hunter Park/UCR		Riverside	Riverside County
Moreno Valley/March Field		Moreno Valley	Riverside County
Perris–Downtown		Perris	Riverside County
Perris–South		Perris	Riverside County

The stations at West Corona, North Main Corona, Riverside-La Sierra, and Riverside-Downtown are also served by the Inland Empire–Orange County Line; the station at Riverside-Downtown is also served by the Riverside Line. Although the 91 Line follows the same route through Los Angeles County as the Orange County Line, the 91 Line does not stop at the Commerce station.
