= Perris–South station =

Commuter rail station in Perris, California

Perris–South
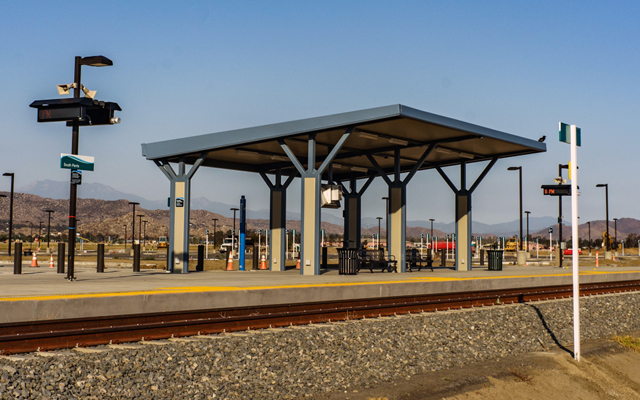

General information
- Other names: South Perris
- Location: 1304 Case Road; Perris, California; United States
- Coordinates: 33.763035°N 117.203591°W
- Owner: Riverside County Transportation Commission
- Line: SCRRA Perris Valley Subdivision
- Platforms: 1 side platform
- Tracks: 1

Construction
- Parking: 907 spaces, 24 accessible spaces
- Cycle facilities: Racks and lockers
- Accessible: Yes

History
- Opened: June 6, 2016; 10 years ago
- Former names: South Perris

Passengers
- FY 2026: 131 (avg. wkdy boardings)

Services
Preceding station	Metrolink	Following station
Perris–Downtown toward L.A. Union Station	91/Perris Valley Line	Terminus
Location

Perris–South station (also known as South Perris station) is a train station in Perris, California, United States, near Menifee, that opened on June 6, 2016, along with the 91/Perris Valley Line extension of the Metrolink commuter rail system. The station consists of a single track with a side platform.

Perris–South station is served by 14 Metrolink 91/Perris Valley Line trains (7 in each direction) each weekday, running primarily at peak hours in the peak direction of travel. Weekend service consists of 4 trains (2 in each direction) on both Saturday and Sunday, running westbound in the morning and eastbound in the evening.

The station contains six bus docks which were previously served by the Riverside Transit Agency, but service was later eliminated with the agency focusing on serving the Perris–Downtown station instead.

In April, 2023, $15.5 million in funding was allocated by the state following a joint application between Metrolink and the Riverside County Transportation Committee (RCTC) for a double-track project along Metrolink’s 91/Perris Valley Line between the cities of Moreno Valley and Perris, which will include installing a second platform for the station. Work is planned to be completed in 2028.
