= Riverside County Transportation Commission =

Commission overview
- Formed: 1976; 50 years ago
- Jurisdiction: Riverside County, California
- Status: Active
- Headquarters: Riverside, California, U.S.; 33.9777443°N 117.3740609°W
- Employees: 49
- Commission executives: Anne Mayer, Executive Director; Kevin Jeffries, District 1; Karen Spiegel, District 2; Chuck Washington, District 3; V. Manuel Perez, District 4; Jeff Hewitt, District 5
- Parent Commission: Southern California Association of Governments
- Child agencies: Western Riverside County Regional Conservation Authority; Riverside Transit Agency; SunLine Transit Agency; Banning Pass Area Transit; Beaumont Transit System; Palo Verde Valley Transit Agency; Riverside Special Transportation Services; Corona Cruiser
- Website: www.rctc.org

The Riverside County Transportation Commission (RCTC) is the County Transportation Commission for Riverside County, California, United States. It is an association of local governments in the county, with policy makers consisting of mayors, councilmembers, and county supervisors, and is the funding agency for the county's transit systems, which include Corona Cruiser, Riverside Transit Agency, SunLine Transit Agency, Pass Transit Agency and Palo Verde Valley Transit Agency. It also provides funds for the maintenance and improvement of roadways within the city. RCTC is a member of the California Association of Councils of Governments and coordinates with the Southern California Association of Governments.

It is additionally the planning agency for the Coachella Valley Rail (CV Rail) project.

== History ==
The commission was formed in 1976. In 1988 and 2002, voters approved a half-cent sales tax known as Measure A which was managed by RCTC.

== Projects ==
=== Metrolink ===
RCTC opened the Riverside Line to the public in June 14 of 1993. In 1995, the Inland Empire–Orange County Line opened to the public. In May of 2002, the 91/Perris Valley Line opened to the public.

== Western Riverside County Regional Conservation Authority ==
Since 2021, RCTC has been the managing agency for the Western Riverside County Regional Conservation Authority

== See also ==
- Transportation in the Inland Empire
