= Montebello/Commerce station =

Train station in Montebello, California, US

Montebello/Commerce
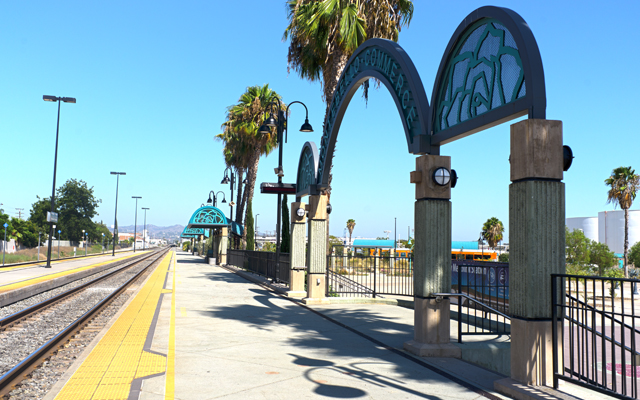
- Montebello/Commerce station platform

General information
- Location: 2000 Flotilla Street; Montebello, California
- Coordinates: 34.0070°N 118.1261°W
- Owner: City of Montebello
- Line: UP Los Angeles Subdivision
- Platforms: 1 side platform, 1 island platform
- Tracks: 2
- Connections: Los Angeles Metro Bus: 18, 66; Montebello Bus Lines: 70; Montebello Link

Construction
- Structure type: Grade-level
- Parking: 267 spaces
- Accessible: Yes

History
- Opened: 1994
- Rebuilt: 2013

Passengers
- FY 2026: 99 (avg. wkdy boardings)

Services
Preceding station	Metrolink	Following station
L.A. Union Station Terminus	Riverside Line	Industry toward Riverside–Downtown
Location

Montebello/Commerce station is a Metrolink train station located at 2000 Flotilla Street in Montebello, California. Metrolink's Riverside Line trains between Los Angeles Union Station and Riverside–Downtown station stop here. It is owned and operated by the City of Montebello.

Montebello/Commerce station is served by 10 Metrolink Riverside Line trains (5 in each direction) each weekday, running primarily at peak hours in the peak direction of travel. There is no service on weekends.

In addition to Metrolink trains, the station is also served by Los Angeles Metro Bus routes 18 and 66 and Montebello Bus Lines route 70. The city also provides a shuttle, called Montebello Link, designed to connect Metrolink passengers with major employment centers. There are approximately 267 parking spaces available.

In September 2012, the Montebello City Council approved a $537,000 beautification project to upgrade the station, which had not been upgraded since its construction in 1997.

The Los Angeles County Metropolitan Transportation Authority (Metro) has plans to relocate the station to be adjacent to the Citadel Outlets to promote additional transit usage and reduce traffic congestion in the surrounding area.
