= Ontario–East station =

Train station in Ontario, California, US

Ontario–East
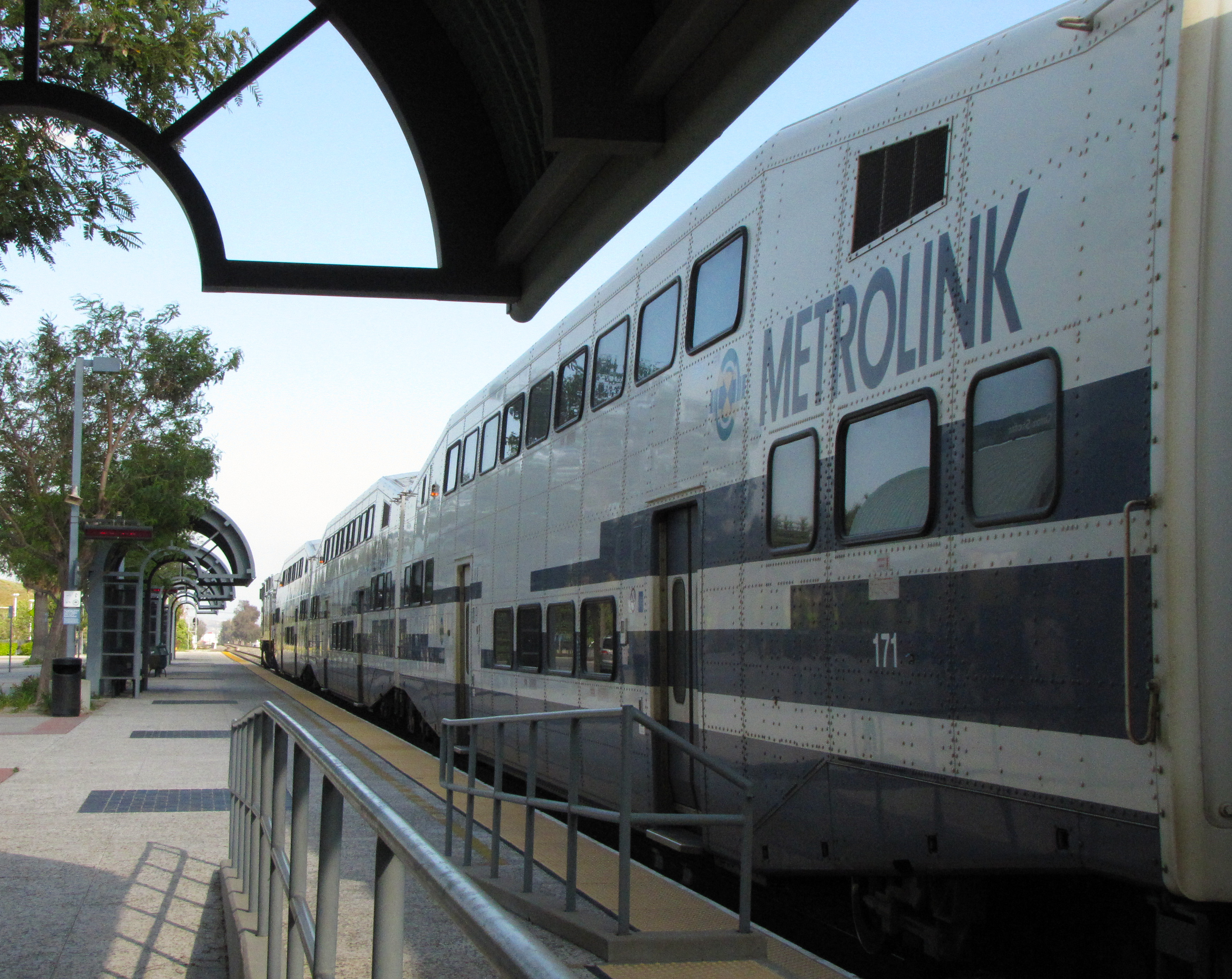
- A train at Ontario–East station in 2010

General information
- Other names: East Ontario
- Location: 3330 East Francis Street; Ontario, California
- Coordinates: 34.0399°N 117.5797°W
- Owner: City of Ontario
- Line: UP Los Angeles Subdivision
- Platforms: 1 side platform, 1 island platform (only boards on one side)
- Tracks: 2
- Connections: Omnitrans: 81

Construction
- Structure type: Grade-level
- Parking: 656 spaces
- Cycle facilities: Racks and lockers
- Accessible: Yes

History
- Opened: June 14, 1993
- Former names: Ontario

Passengers
- FY 2026: 156 (avg. wkdy boardings)

Services
Preceding station	Metrolink	Following station
Pomona–Downtown toward L.A. Union Station	Riverside Line	Jurupa Valley/Pedley toward Riverside–Downtown
Location

Ontario–East station (also known as East Ontario station) is a Metrolink train station in Ontario, California, United States. Metrolink's Riverside Line trains between Los Angeles Union Station and Riverside–Downtown station stop here. Originally opened in 1993 as simply Ontario, the station was one of the original five stations on the line opening in Summer of 1993.

Ontario–East station is served by 10 Metrolink Riverside Line trains (5 in each direction) each weekday, running primarily at peak hours in the peak direction of travel. There is no service on weekends.

The station is owned and operated by the City of Ontario. Omnitrans Route 81 also operates to the station. Ontario–East is the closest station to Ontario International Airport. Airport passengers can take Omnitrans Route 81 to the consolidated rental car facility on Haven Avenue, where a free airport shuttle will deliver them to the terminal. The connection is free with a Metrolink ticket. There are 656 parking spaces available at the station.

== See also ==
- Ontario station (Amtrak)
