= Ontario International Airport Authority =

Agency overview
- Formed: August 2012
- Jurisdiction: Ontario International Airport; Ontario, California
- Website: https://www.flyontario.com/corporate/airport-authority

The Ontario International Airport Authority (OIAA) is an airport authority that governs Ontario International Airport in Ontario, California.

The OIAA was created in August 2012 under a joint-powers agreement between the City of Ontario, California, and San Bernardino County.

The OIAA oversees the operation of Ontario International Airport, having gained operational control of the airport from Los Angeles World Airports on November 1, 2016.
