= Shorb Line =

California streetcar route between Pasadena and Alhambra

Shorb

Overview
- Locale: Los Angeles County, California
- Termini: Pasadena; Shorb

Service
- Type: Interurban
- System: Pacific Electric
- Operator(s): Pacific Electric

History
- Opened: May 1, 1912
- Closed: April 16, 1924

Technical
- Track gauge: 1,435 mm (4 ft 8 1/2 in) standard gauge
- Electrification: Overhead line, 600 V DC

The Shorb Line is a former Pacific Electric interurban railway line in Los Angeles County, California. Unlike most of the company's services, trains did not travel to Downtown Los Angeles and instead provided a suburban service between Pasadena and the transcontinental Southern Pacific railway at Alhambra.

== History ==
Opened as the Dolgeville freight branch in 1904, the rails from the Alhambra–San Gabriel Line to Shorb were built to serve model building manufacturers and a felt factory. Passenger service to Shorb station began on May 1, 1912, with cars running to Pasadena's Southern Pacific depot. The route was abandoned after April 16, 1924 and was replaced with bus service. Freight customers along the branch line kept rails in service until 1951, whereupon the tracks were transferred to Southern Pacific.

== Route ==
The Shorb Line connected to the rest of the Pacific Electric via the Alhambra–San Gabriel Line at West Alhambra. The single track ran south via Palm Avenue.
