= Pomona–Downtown station =

Train station in downtown Pomona, California, US

Pomona–Downtown
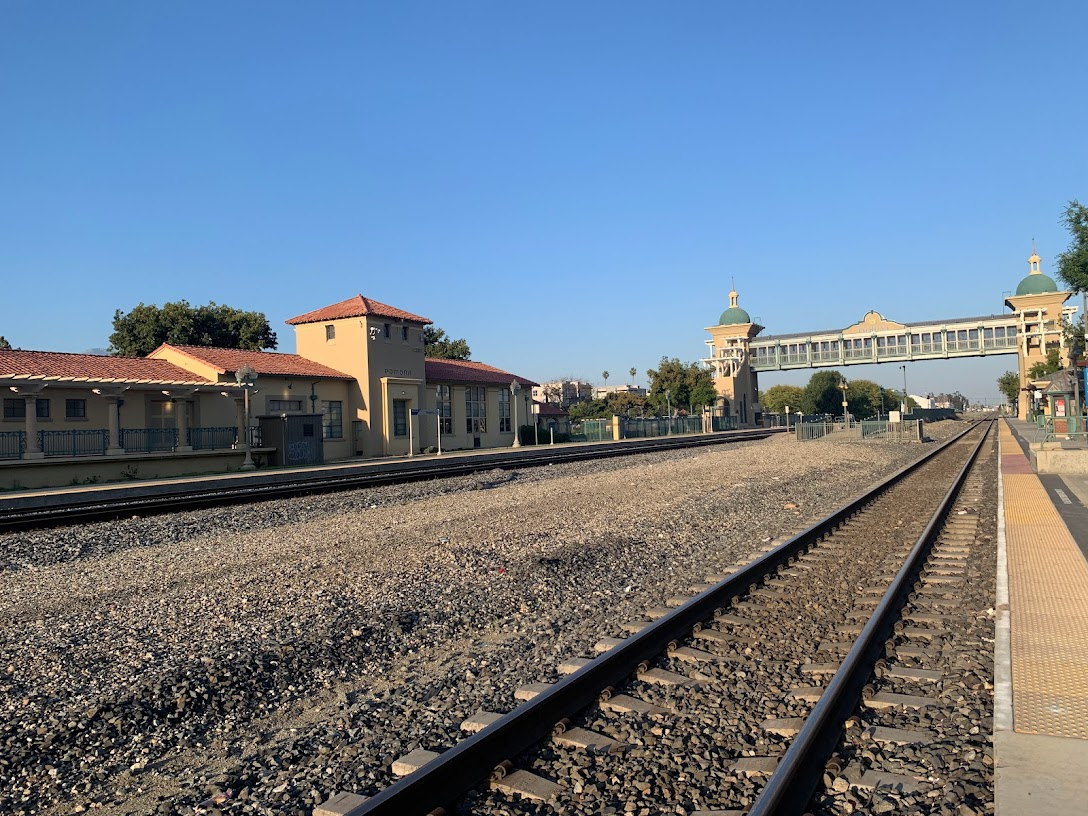
- Pomona–Downtown station in 2023

General information
- Other names: Pomona; Pomona Transit Center
- Location: 100 West Commercial Street; Pomona, California; United States
- Coordinates: 34.059188°N 117.75117°W
- Owner: City of Pomona
- Lines: UP Los Angeles Subdivision; UP Alhambra Subdivision
- Platforms: 1 island and 2 side platforms
- Tracks: 3
- Train operators: Amtrak; Metrolink
- Bus routes: Foothill Transit: 195, 197, 286, 291, 292, 480, 482, 486; Omnitrans: 61
- Bus stands: 12

Construction
- Parking: 907 paid spaces
- Accessible: Yes

Other information
- Station code: Amtrak: POS

History
- Opened: 1940, 2001 (Metrolink)

Passengers
- FY 2025: 1,434 annually (Amtrak)
- FY 2026: 86 weekday boardings (Metrolink)

Services
Preceding station	Amtrak	Following station
Los Angeles Terminus	Sunset Limited	Ontario toward New Orleans
Los Angeles Terminus	Texas Eagle	Ontario toward Chicago
Preceding station	Metrolink	Following station
Industry toward L.A. Union Station	Riverside Line	Ontario–East toward Riverside–Downtown
Preceding station	Foothill Transit	Following station
El Monte (stops en route) toward Downtown Los Angeles	Silver Streak	Montclair Transit Center (stops en route) Terminus
Former services
Preceding station	Southern Pacific Railroad	Following station
Alhambra toward Los Angeles	Sunset Route	Ontario toward New Orleans
Future services
Preceding station	Omnitrans	Following station
Terminus	Purple Line	Holt Av/Garey Av toward Victoria Gardens
Location

Pomona–Downtown station (also called Pomona station and Pomona Transit Center), is a train station in downtown Pomona, California, United States. It is primarily served by Metrolink’s Riverside Line commuter rail service. The station is also served by limited Amtrak long-distance inter-city rail service, with the thrice-weekly round trip of the combined Sunset Limited/Texas Eagle. It is owned and operated by the city of Pomona.

== Station design ==
Two Union Pacific Railroad lines – the Los Angeles Subdivision and the ex-Southern Pacific Alhambra Subdivision – run parallel east-west through Pomona station. Amtrak trains use the Alhambra Subdivision, with a single side platform on the north side of the single track. Metrolink trains use a side platform on the south side of the two-track Los Angeles Subdivision; a disused platform is also located between the two tracks. The historic station building and a bus plaza are located on the north side of the tracks. A footbridge connects the north and south platforms.

== History ==
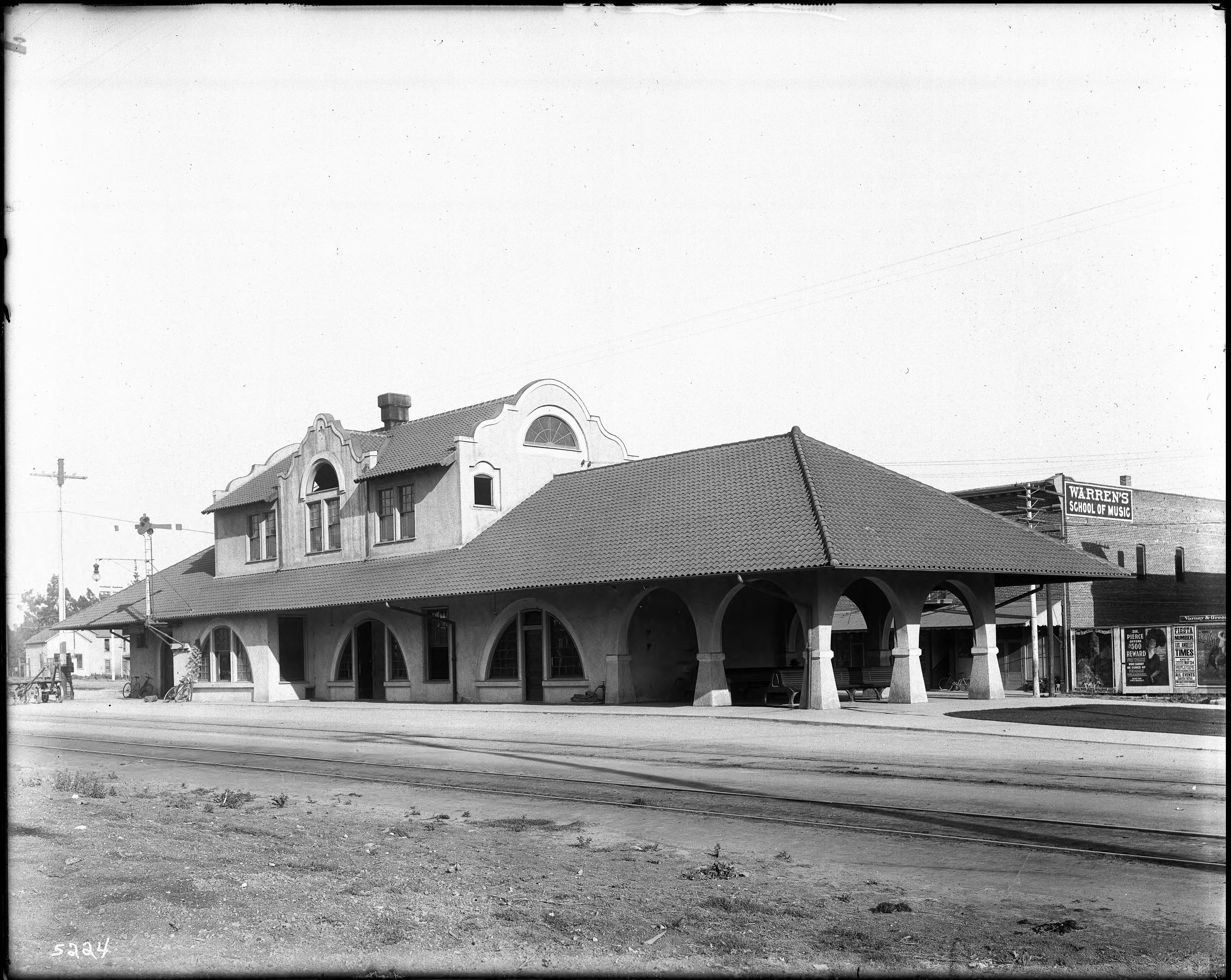
Exterior view of the previous Pomona Railroad Station, c. 1906

The 1940 station was designed by Donald Parkinson in the Mission Revival and Spanish Colonial Revival styles. Details include stuccoed walls, an arcade and red clay tile roofs. It once served the main Southern Pacific Railroad line from Los Angeles to New Orleans, and the main Los Angeles and Salt Lake Railroad line. Currently both lines are now Union Pacific Railroad lines.

When Amtrak took over intercity rail service in the United States in 1971, it continued serving Pomona with the Sunset Limited. Through cars on the Eagle (now the Texas Eagle) began in 1986. The Riverside Line service began in 1993, but service to Pomona–Downtown station did not begin until February 5, 2001. The bus transit center opened on February 4, 1996, offering timed transfers for Foothill Transit routes serving the Pomona area. The sbX Purple Line bus rapid transit route between Pomona–Downtown station and Ontario International Airport is expected to open in 2026.

During much of the 2010s, the local homeless population began moving around the station and the nearby area. In 2018 an Amtrak engineer was charged with the murder of two homeless men shot and killed on the south platform. In 2020, it was discovered that multiple transients living in the nearby encampments had been regularly breaking into freight trains parked on the adjacent tracks. The station was renovated in 2020 at a cost of $1.3 million to remove the growing homeless encampments on the north platform, in addition to repainting the bridge and removing graffiti from the opposing wall. The station housed a Foothill Transit store until it closed on December 29, 2023.

The station is a proposed stop on the second phase of the California High-Speed Rail project.

As of 2024, Amtrak plans to modify the platform for accessibility later in the 2020s.

== Services ==
Pomona–Downtown station is served by 10 Metrolink Riverside Line trains (5 in each direction) each weekday, running primarily at peak hours in the peak direction of travel. There is no service on weekends. The Sunset Limited and the Texas Eagle both operate as a single combined train, with the eastbound train stopping at the station on Wednesday, Friday and Sunday at 10:40 p.m., and westbound trains stopping at the station on Monday, Wednesday and Friday at 4:00 a.m. The Riverside Line follows the State Route 60 freeway corridor while the Sunset Limited and the Texas Eagle separates and follows the Alhambra Subdivision, owned by the Union Pacific Railroad.

Foothill Transit uses the station as a transit center for the area, with extensive connections throughout the San Gabriel Valley. The bus depot is located near the main station building, adjacent to the North platform, across from 1st and Commercial Streets. Lines 195, 197, 286, 291, 292, 480, 482, 486 provide service to the station. The Silver Streak provides bus rapid transit service to Downtown Los Angeles and Montclair seven days a week. Omnitrans operates route 61 from Fontana to the station, providing connections to Ontario International Airport.
