= Alhambra station =

Railway station in Alhambra, California, United States

Alhambra, CA
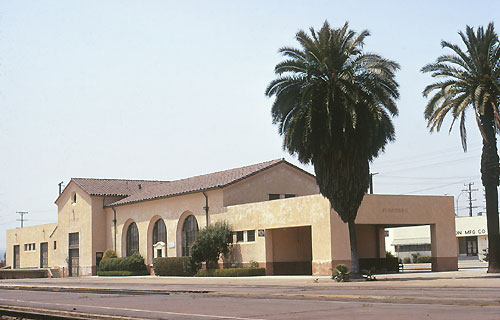
- The station in May 1973

General information
- Location: 2200 West Mission Road; Alhambra, California
- Coordinates: 34°04′46.7″N 118°08′55.7″W
- Owner: Southern Pacific Transportation Company
- Line: SP Alhambra Subdivision
- Tracks: 2
- Train operators: Amtrak

History
- Opened: 1886
- Closed: 1975
- Rebuilt: 1940
- Former names: Shorb

Former services
Preceding station	Amtrak	Following station
Los Angeles Terminus	Sunset Limited	Pomona toward New Orleans
Preceding station	Southern Pacific Railroad	Following station
Los Angeles Terminus	Sunset Route	Pomona toward New Orleans
Central Station 1914–1939 Terminus	Sunset Route	Pomona toward New Orleans
Arcade Depot until 1914 Terminus	Sunset Route	Pomona toward New Orleans
Naud Junction toward Arcade Depot	Pasadena Branch	San Gabriel Winery toward Pasadena
Naud Junction toward Arcade Depot	Duarte Branch	West Alhambra toward Duarte
Preceding station	Pacific Electric	Following station
Shorb Road Junction toward Pasadena SP	Shorb	Terminus
Location

Alhambra station was a train station in Alhambra, California. It was last served by the Amtrak Sunset Limited.

== History ==
Opened in 1886 as Shorb, the station was a stop on the transcontinental Southern Pacific Railroad Sunset Limited. The first building was located at Garfield Avenue and Mission Road. A separate Alhambra station operated two route miles (3.2 km) to the east.

Pacific Electric built their route for the Shorb Line spur here in 1912 to connect their interurban system to the transcontinental passenger network; their passenger service ceased in 1924.

The station building was reconstructed in 1940. Passenger services were commuted to Amtrak in 1971, who took over operations at the depot. Trains ceased to stop in 1975 as the station was bypassed. The tracks were depressed into a trench by the city with work starting in 1977. The tracks currently run in the trench below surface grade throughout Alhambra, rejoining grade-level tracks in El Monte adjacent to Metrolink’s El Monte station, served by the San Bernardino Line. The station was subsequently destroyed by a fire in 1984.
