= Industry station =

Train station in Industry, California, US

City of Industry
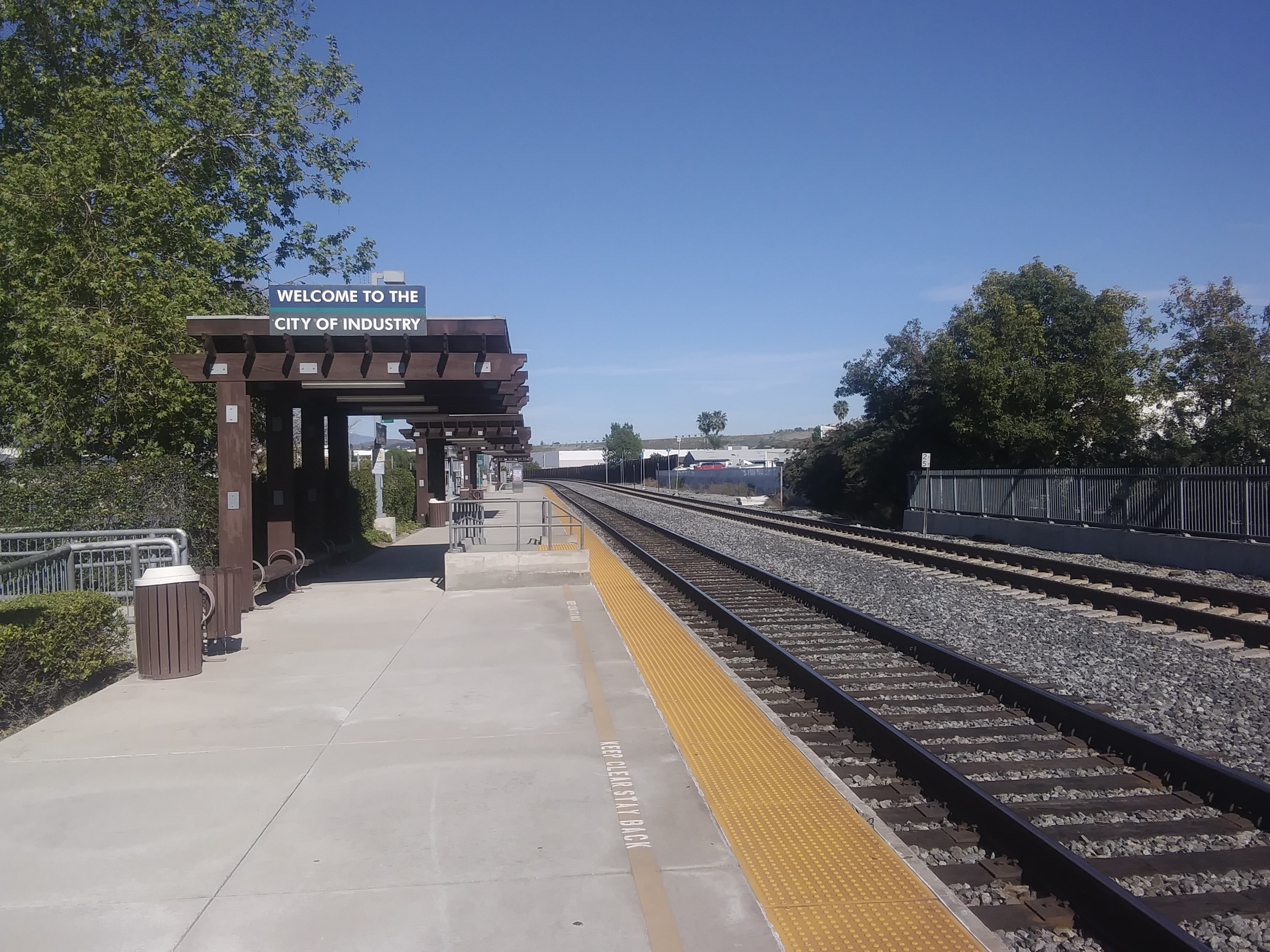
- Industry station from the east end of the platform looking west

General information
- Location: 600 South Brea Canyon Road; City of Industry, California
- Coordinates: 34.0079°N 117.8456°W
- Owner: City of Industry
- Line: UP Los Angeles Subdivision
- Platforms: 1 side platform
- Tracks: 2
- Connections: Foothill Transit: 495

Construction
- Structure type: Grade-level
- Parking: 1,200 spaces
- Accessible: Yes

History
- Opened: June 14, 1993

Passengers
- FY 2026: 197 (avg. wkdy boardings)

Services
Preceding station	Metrolink	Following station
Montebello/Commerce toward L.A. Union Station	Riverside Line	Pomona–Downtown toward Riverside–Downtown
Location

Industry station (signed as City of Industry) is a Metrolink train station located at 600 South Brea Canyon Road in City of Industry, California. Metrolink's Riverside Line trains between Los Angeles Union Station and Riverside–Downtown station stop here. It is owned and operated by the City of Industry.

Industry station is served by 10 Metrolink Riverside Line trains (5 in each direction) each weekday, running primarily at peak hours in the peak direction of travel. There is no service on weekends.

In 2011, Industry station had the highest ridership on the Riverside line, averaging 1,378 daily boardings, representing 34.5% of all boardings for the Riverside line.

== History ==
Industry station opened on June 14, 1993, and built at a cost of $2.4 million as one of the original 5 stations on the line. In 1994, the Riverside line had Metrolink's highest ridership per week, averaging 2,000 passengers. A second platform facing north was originally constructed to serve the opposite side of the tracks but was mostly removed sometime around 2007. In 2012, 8,000 solar panels were installed to cover 940 parking spaces in an $11 million project that generates 2.2 megawatts (3,000 hp) of electricity per hour. The project also included the installation of 64 electric car charging stations. Most of the funding came from Proposition 1A, although the South Coast Air Quality Management District also provided a $2 million grant.

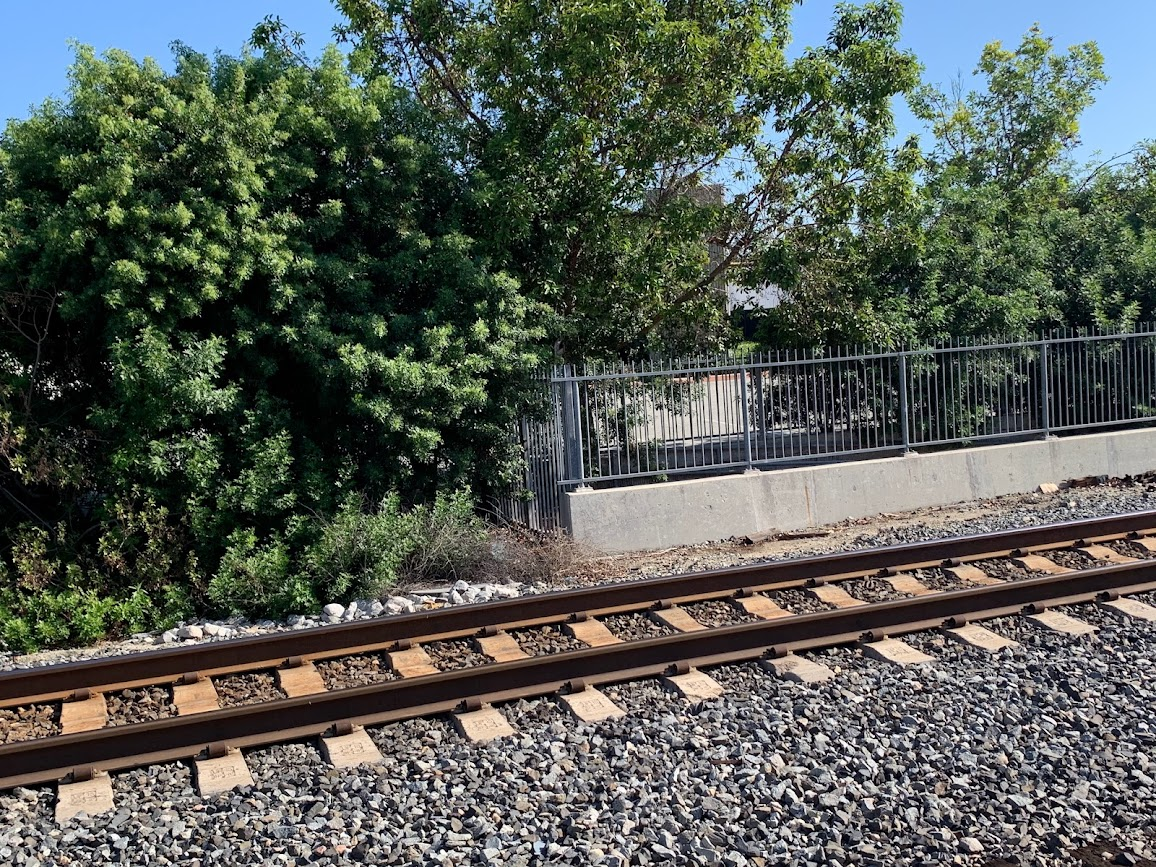
The remnants of the former platform 2.

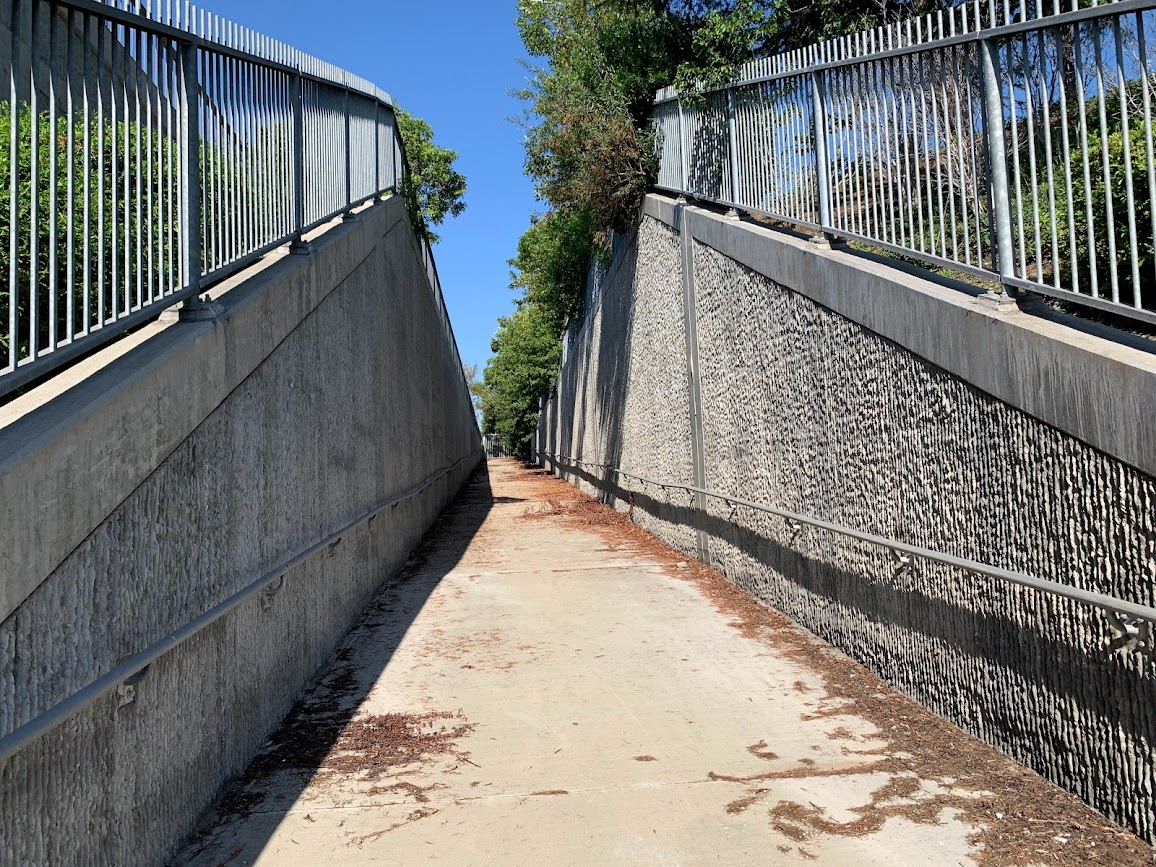
The abandoned platform 2 entrance.
