= Riverside Line =

Commuter rail line in Southern California

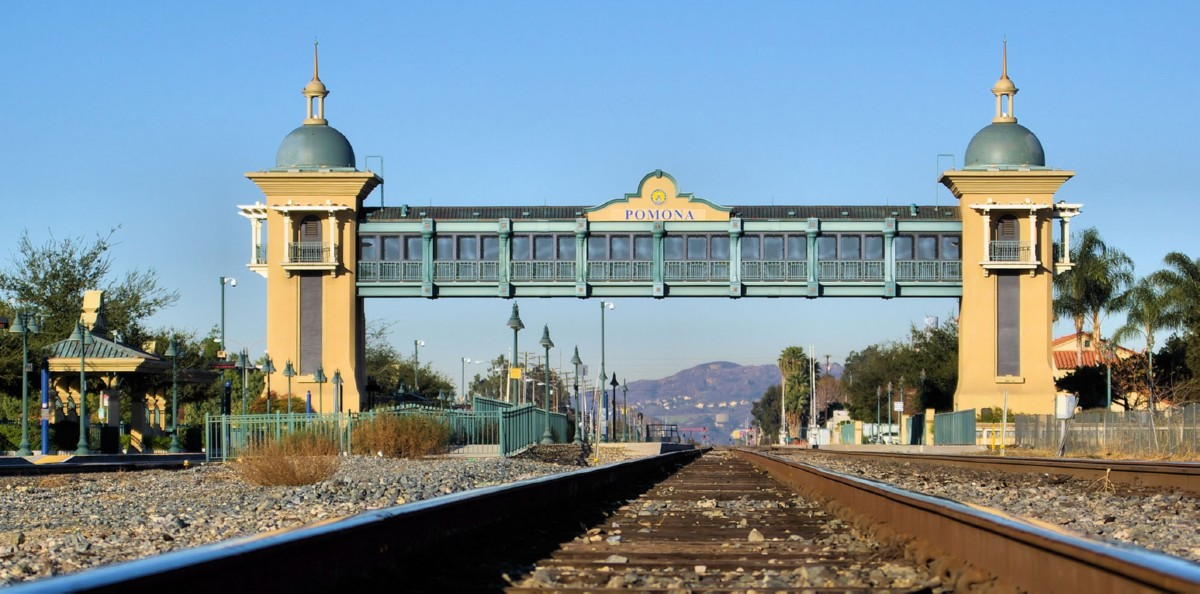
- View from the tracks at the Pomona-Downtown station

Overview
- Locale: Greater Los Angeles Area and Inland Empire
- Termini: L.A. Union Station; Riverside–Downtown
- Stations: 7

Service
- Type: Commuter rail
- System: Metrolink
- Operator: Metrolink
- Daily ridership: 1,194 (weekdays, Q3 2025)

History
- Opened: June 1993

Technical
- Line length: 59.1 miles (95.1 km)
- Character: Elevated and surface-level
- Track gauge: 4 ft 8 1/2 in (1,435 mm) standard gauge
- Operating speed: 41 miles per hour (66 km/h) (average)
Route map
Riverside Line highlighted in purple

Metrolink's Riverside Line is a commuter rail line running from L.A. Union Station in Downtown Los Angeles to Riverside along the Union Pacific Railroad. It runs weekday peak commuter hours only, with very little midday and reverse commute service. In 2024, the average weekday ridership was 1,269 passengers.

== History ==
The Riverside Line, the fourth line to be introduced, was added to the Metrolink system in June 1993. This line featured Saturday service from June 2000 until January 2002, when it was cancelled due to low ridership and is now the only line in the entire Metrolink system to not have weekend or holiday service. As of November 2021, the line has seven trains daily on weekdays only with reverse commute service temporarily eliminated in 2019, but revived with only one train per day as of 2021.

The Riverside Line can be used to get to Ontario International Airport; the East Ontario station has an airport shuttle served by Omnitrans Bus route 81 as of 2019, including discounted Lyft fares from the station.

As Metrolink trains along the Riverside Line share tracks with Union Pacific freight trains, delays of up to 90 minutes are not uncommon. In April 2005, morning westbound trains arrived on schedule 90% of the time, while those headed east during the evening arrived on schedule only 72% of the time.

=== Present decline ===
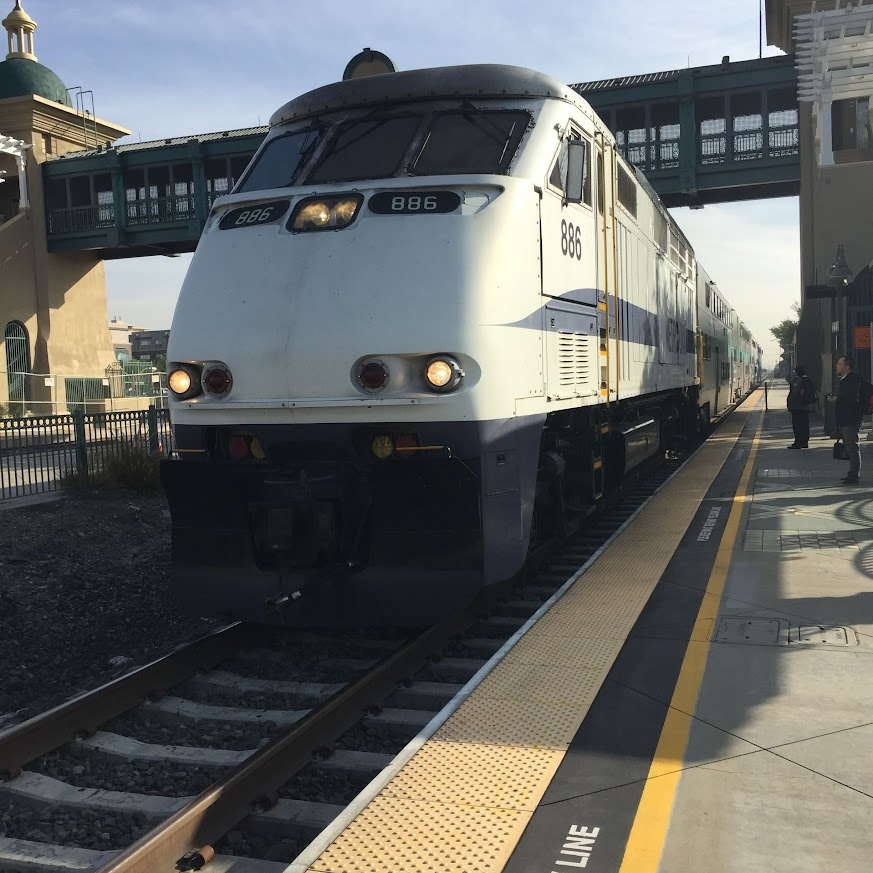
A train stopping at Pomona c. 2019

Ridership for the Riverside Line has gradually declined following the opening of the 91/Perris Valley Line in 2002. Much of the decline in service has been a direct result of competition with the 91/Perris Valley Line or San Bernardino Line, or track right-of-way disputes with Union Pacific. Planning of the line's route has also come into question later in its lifetime, as the line was not redirected to the north half of the Monte Vista Subdivision to possibly construct a station to directly serve Ontario International Airport, which was heavily renovated in 1998. As a result, many riders believe Metrolink has not made the line as much of a priority for frequent usage, which has shown in the decline of trains per day in recent schedule updates. As of 2025, the Riverside Line operates five trains on weekdays only.

== Stations ==
| Station | Connections | Location | |
|---|---|---|---|
| L.A. Union Station | Metrolink: 91/Perris Valley Antelope Valley Orange County San Bernardino Ventura County; Amtrak: Coast Starlight, Pacific Surfliner, Southwest Chief, Sunset Limited, Texas Eagle; Metro: A Line B Line D Line J Line; FlyAway to LAX | Los Angeles | Los Angeles County |
| Montebello/Commerce | | Montebello | Los Angeles County |
| Industry | | City of Industry | Los Angeles County |
| Pomona–Downtown | Amtrak: Sunset Limited, Texas Eagle | Pomona | Los Angeles County |
| Ontario–East | | Ontario | San Bernardino County |
| Jurupa Valley/Pedley | | Jurupa Valley | Riverside County |
| Riverside–Downtown | Metrolink: 91/Perris Valley Inland Empire–Orange County; Amtrak: Southwest Chief | Riverside | Riverside County |

== Demographics ==
In 2011, the average weekday ridership was 5,161 passengers, with 46 percent male and 54 percent female. Eighty-nine percent of riders used the line for work commutes. The median household income for riders was US$86,028.

Ridership by ethnicity was evenly split:

- 27% Hispanic
- 27% Caucasian
- 21% Asian/Pacific Islander
- 19% African American
- 5% other

== Accidents and fatalities ==
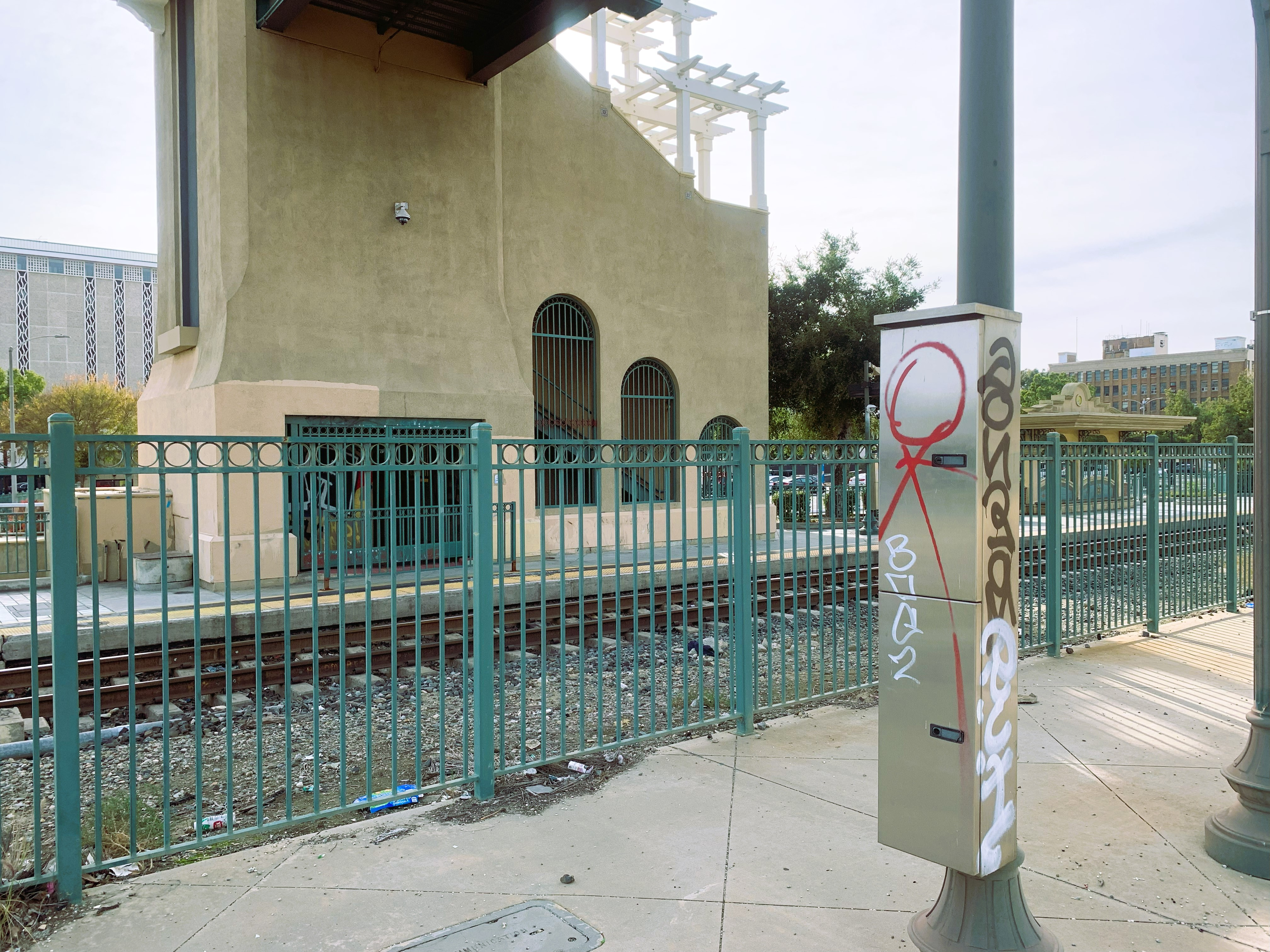
An abandoned platform at Pomona–Downtown station

Numerous accidents and deaths have occurred on the Riverside Line since its inception.

- On December 30, 1993, around 6:15 pm, a pedestrian was killed in a collision with a Metrolink train near Bon View Avenue and Mission Boulevard (adjacent to Ontario International Airport).
- On August 25, 1994, at 6:39 a.m., a Metrolink train struck a car containing three adults and an infant girl in Riverside, all occupants were killed.
- On September 27, 1994, a man was struck and killed by a Metrolink train in near the Montebello/Commerce station.
- On October 26, 1997, at 5:33 a.m., a 95-year-old, hearing-impaired man was hit and killed by a Riverside Line train.
- On January 30, 2003, at 5:33 am, a clinically depressed 37-year-old man was killed by a Metrolink train when it collided with his car after being parked on a City of Industry rail crossing. The death was reported to be a suicide.
- On March 9, 2005, a Union Pacific train crashed near Fullerton Road and Railroad Street in the City of Industry, derailing 21 rail cars and disrupting Metrolink service on the Riverside Line. The crash was caused by a broken track.
- On December 13, 2006, at 4:40 p.m., a Metrolink train struck a man standing on the tracks near the Pomona Freeway and 7th Avenue, between Metrolink's Montebello/Commerce and Industry stations.
- On November 9, 2008, at 2:25 p.m., a 44-year old man was struck and killed by a train in Jurupa Valley.
- On September 5, 2013, at 9:21 a.m., a man was struck and killed by westbound train #409 at the Hamilton Boulevard grade crossing, about a half-mile west of the downtown Pomona station.
- On April 5, 2016, at around 6:20 a.m., man was struck and killed by a Union Pacific train in Montclair, delaying Metrolink service for up to 3 hours.
- On September 9, 2016, at around 4:30 a.m., a woman was struck and killed by a train near the Montebello station in what was believed to be a suicide.
- On July 24, 2017, at 2:45 p.m., a man identified as 40 year old Frederico Duran of Long Beach was struck and killed off of the Archibald Ave crossing in Ontario, the death was later determined to be a suicide.
- On March 29, 2018, at 2:19 p.m., a Woman was struck and killed by eastbound Metrolink train 402 at the Campus Ave crossing in Ontario.
- On June 12, 2018, a woman was killed after her car was struck by a train at the Archibald Avenue crossing in Ontario.
- On August 16, 2018, at 4:30 am, Pomona police officers responded to a call after the bodies of two homeless men were found at the Downtown-Pomona station. The bodies were later identified as 37-year old Robert Salinas Jr and 31-year old Jeremy Alexander Henness. Both men were found to have received multiple gunshot wounds on the South platform of the Pomona station. Ontario police officers later apprehended Amtrak engineer Christopher Matthew Peterson as the sole suspect in the murders. He was later charged in connection with the shootings and is currently awaiting sentencing.
- On October 5, 2018, at 1:45pm, the body of an unidentified homeless woman was found near the tracks under the Temple Ave overpass in Diamond Bar.
- On May 31, 2019, at around 2:00 p.m., a 22 year old woman later identified as Evelyn Gamarro was killed by an oncoming Metrolink train traveling at approximately 60 mph near Buena Vista Avenue in Pomona. Local authorities later determined the death to be a suicide based on witness reports.
- On December 21, 2022, at 9:03 a.m., a man was struck and killed by a westbound Amtrak train in Pomona, cancelling all westbound Metrolink trains, resulting in Metro offering reimbursements to multiple passengers.
- On May 14, 2023 at 5:30 a.m., an unidentified pedestrian was struck and killed by a freight train in Pomona, delaying Metrolink service up to 3 hours due to the ongoing investigation.
- On May 17, 2023, 37-year old Jaqueline Sweet was struck and killed by an inbound Riverside Line train near Commerce and 3rd Street in Downtown Riverside.
- On June 5, 2023, at 5:20 p.m., a 22-year old man was hit by an inbound train in Riverside adjacent to the Iowa Avenue crossing. The man was later identified as Samuel Lissy of Riverside.
- On June 23, 2023, at 10:28p.m., an unidentified homeless individual was struck and killed by a Union Pacific freight train adjacent to the Temple Ave crossing in Diamond Bar. Amtrak service was affected as outbound trains were delayed up to 4 hours.

== See also ==
- Metro Local (Los Angeles County) – local transfer bus routes
- Riverside Transit Agency – local transfer bus routes
