= Ontario International Airport =

Airport in Ontario, California, United States

- IATA: ONT; ICAO: KONT; FAA LID: ONT

Summary
- Airport type: Public
- Owner/Operator: Ontario International Airport Authority
- Serves: Inland Empire; Greater Los Angeles
- Location: Ontario, California, U.S.
- Opened: 1923; 103 years ago
- Hub for: Ameriflight; FedEx Express; UPS Airlines
- Focus city for: Amazon Air
- Elevation AMSL: 944 ft (288 m)
- Coordinates: 34°03′22″N 117°36′04″W
- Website: flyontario.com

Maps
- FAA airport diagram as of 6/11/26
- Location within the Los Angeles metropolitan area Location within California Location within the United States
- Interactive map of Ontario International Airport

Runways
Direction	Length		Surface
Direction	ft	m	Surface
08L/26R	12,197	3,718	Concrete
08R/26L	10,200	3,109	Concrete

Statistics (2025)
- Total Passengers: 7,116,735 ▲0.4%
- Aircraft operations (2024): 106,715
- Total cargo (tons): 835,129
- Source: Federal Aviation Administration

Ontario International Airport (IATA: ONT, ICAO: KONT, FAA LID: ONT) is an international airport 2 mi (3.2 km) east of downtown Ontario, in San Bernardino County, California, United States, about 38 mi (61 km) east of downtown Los Angeles and 18 mi (29 km) west of downtown San Bernardino. It is owned and operated under a joint-powers agreement with the city of Ontario and San Bernardino County.

The airport covers 1,741 acres (705 ha) and has two parallel runways. It is the West Coast air and truck hub for UPS Airlines and is a major distribution point for FedEx Express. As of June 2026, ONT has around 90 daily departures and arrivals. Since Ontario's longer runway (runway 8L/26R) is longer than three of the four runways at Los Angeles International Airport (LAX), it is an alternate landing site for large aircraft destined for LAX. It is the eighth-busiest airport in the United States by cargo carried, as of 2024.

== History ==
=== Origins ===
In 1923, a landing field was established east of Central Avenue (3 mi (4.8 km) west of the current airport) on land leased from the Union Pacific Railroad. The airfield was named Latimer Field after an orange-packing company next to the airstrip. An airport was built there by one of the first flying clubs in Southern California, the Friends of Ontario Airport. In 1929, the city of Ontario purchased 30 acres (12 ha), now in the southwest corner of the airport, for $12,000 (equivalent to $225,000 in 2025), and established the Ontario Municipal Airport.

In 1941, the city bought 470 acres (190 ha) around the airport and approved construction of new runways, which were completed by 1942, with funds from the Works Progress Administration. The 6,200 ft (1,900 m) east–west runway and the 4,700 ft (1,400 m) northeast–southwest runway cost $350,000 (equivalent to $6,900,000 in 2025). On 27 February 1942, an Army Air Corps plane made the first landing at the new airport. By 1943, the airport was an Army Air Corps Lockheed P-38 Lightning training base and North American P-51 Mustang operating base.

After the war, it was one of the five large storage, sales, and scrapping centers for United States Army Air Forces aircraft established by the Reconstruction Finance Corporation; others were at Albuquerque AAF, New Mexico; Altus AAF, Oklahoma; Kingman AAF, Arizona; and Walnut Ridge AAF, Arkansas.

=== Ontario International Airport ===
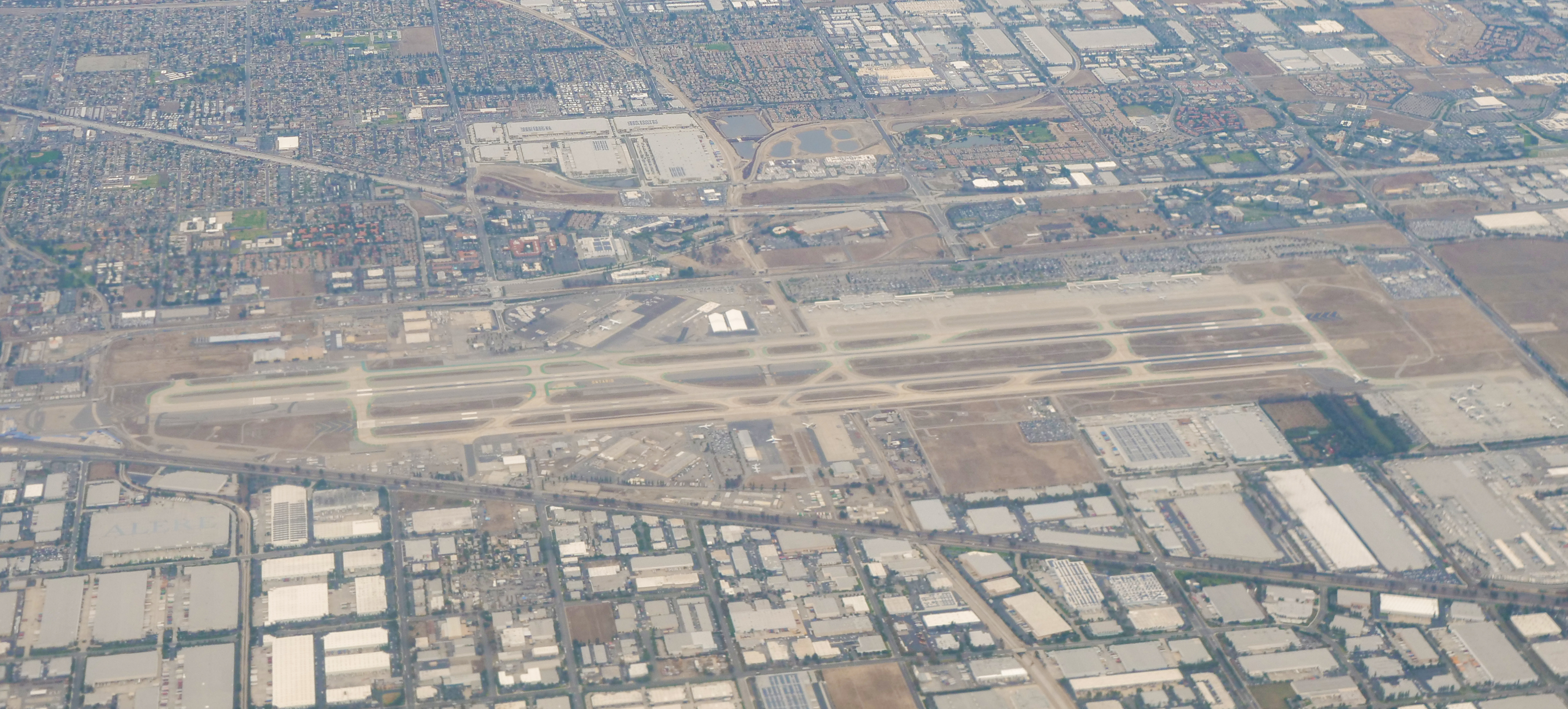
Aerial view of Ontario International Airport

In late 1945, a new airline called Industrial Air Transport selected Ontario as its headquarters. Industrial was founded by former pilots of Consairway, a World War II division of Convair that pioneered transPacific flights on behalf of the Air Transport Command (ATC). At that time, Ontario's airport had the best runways in the LA area for supporting long-haul air transport. Industrial's plans accelerated when, in March 1946, it was awarded a contract to fly 15 Douglas C-54 (DC-4) aircraft for the Air Transport Command to fly across the Pacific to Japan. In early April, soon after starting service for the ATC, Industrial changed its name to Pacific Overseas Airlines (POA). Shortly thereafter, Ontario changed the name of the airport to Ontario International Airport. The airport and city greatly accommodated POA, including buying two war-surplus steel hangars on behalf of the airline. Later in the year POA started flying its own C-54 aircraft from Ontario to Shanghai and Manila, making Ontario an Asian gateway: ambassadors and other Asian VIPs entered and departed the US through Ontario. By the end of the year, POA had 19 C-54 aircraft and over 700 employees. In 1947, POA entered into a joint-venture with shareholders from what was then called Siam to create Pacific Overseas Airlines (Siam) (POAS). POAS started scheduled service from Bangkok to Ontario. External links has very brief color footage of Pacific Overseas Airlines at Ontario in 1947.

However, POA's fall was almost as swift as its rise and by 1948 it had ceased airline operations, lingering at Ontario until 1952 as a maintenance provider. But POAS became a constituent airline that ultimately created today's Thai Airways International, making POA a Southern California ancestor of the Thai flag carrier.

In 1949, Western Airlines began scheduled flights; in 1955, Bonanza Air Lines flights started. Western and Bonanza nonstops did not reach beyond Las Vegas. In 1962, Western began nonstop flights to San Francisco (one Electra daily). In 1967, Bonanza began nonstop F27 flights to Phoenix.

Ontario and Los Angeles entered into a joint-powers agreement, making Ontario International Airport part of the Los Angeles regional airports system in 1967. In 1968, the airport had its first scheduled jet flights. In 1969, Continental Airlines started Boeing 720B nonstops to Denver and Chicago; Air California started Boeing 737 flights to San Jose; Pacific Southwest Airlines started San Francisco flights; and Western began 737 nonstops to Sacramento and Salt Lake City. In 1970, United Airlines started a nonstop to Chicago and American started flights to Dallas (and Chicago, for a short time). In September 1986, Ontario hosted the Concorde supersonic airliner during a promotional round-the-world flight.

In 1981, a second east–west runway, 26L/8R, was built, necessitating the removal of the old NE-SW runway 3/21. Remnants of the 3/21 runway are visible in the present-day taxiways. With the completion of the new runway, the existing runway 25/7 became 26R/8L. In 1985, the city of Los Angeles acquired Ontario International Airport outright from the city of Ontario. In 1987, Runway 26R/8L was extended to the east to bring the two runway thresholds side by side, so aircraft would be higher over neighborhoods. 26R/8L became the main departing runway and 26L/8R the main arrival runway.

For a number of years, the airport operated alongside Ontario Air National Guard Station, which was closed as a result of the 1995 Base Realignment and Closure Commission.

In 1998, the new and larger airport terminal opened, designed by DMJM Aviation. Two older terminals, west of the current terminal, the main terminal and a small terminal were discontinued when the new Terminal 2 and Terminal 4 facilities were opened. The old terminals currently house the administration and the USO.

In 2005 and 2006, runway 26R/8L was repaved and strengthened, and received storm drains and better runway lighting, and additional improvements to taxiway intersections were made.

In 2006, Ontario International Airport became LA/Ontario International Airport. The "LA" portion was added to remind fliers of Greater Los Angeles and to avoid confusion with the province of Ontario in Canada.

The airport's traffic peaked in 2005 with 7.2 million passengers, and remained steady through 2007. Around the time of the 2008 financial crisis, JetBlue suspended service to ONT, and major legacy carriers significantly decreased their passenger volume at the airport. Southwest Airlines transferred a significant portion of its Ontario capacity to Los Angeles International Airport (LAX), making LAX fares more competitive with ONT, while being coupled with more attractive frequencies and a wider range of destinations. The surrounding Inland Empire region was heavily affected by the 2008 financial crisis, with the nearby city of San Bernardino declaring bankruptcy. The airport suffered a 40% decline in traffic between 2007 and 2012, during which time traffic at LAX recovered to surpass prerecession levels.

=== Ontario International Airport Authority ===
Ownership and control of the airport became an issue in late 2010, when the city of Ontario, supported by the Southern California Association of Governments, criticized and questioned LAWA's operation of the airport. A group of local government officials, led by Ontario city council member Alan Wapner, began a campaign to transfer control of the airport away from Los Angeles World Airports. Wapner argued that the City of Los Angeles had no interest in maintaining service at an airport well beyond its borders. In 2013, LAWA offered to return the airport to local control for a purchase price of $474M, which was rejected. Local groups then sued the city of Los Angeles, a suit that was temporarily suspended when both sides agreed to attempt to work together.

In 2015, Los Angeles World Airports agreed to turn over ownership of Ontario Airport to the city of Ontario. LAWA was "to be reimbursed for its investments in the facility, job protection for the facility's 182 employees and the settlement of a lawsuit in which Ontario sought to regain control of the airport. Upon transfer of ownership, the airport would be operated by the Ontario International Airport Authority, formed under a joint-powers agreement between the city of Ontario and San Bernardino County". The Ontario International Airport Authority took over control of operations in November 2016, and the airport's operating name was reverted to Ontario International Airport, since the City of Los Angeles no longer oversaw operations of the airport.

The airport's continuing traffic decline reversed in early 2017, when the airport experienced faster growth than LAX for the first time since 2007. On September 30, 2017, it was announced that China Airlines would begin nonstop flights from Ontario to Taipei, which started in spring 2018.

On July 14, 2023, New Pacific Airlines (formerly known as Northern Pacific Airways) commenced operations and made its first flight to Harry Reid International Airport in Las Vegas, Nevada, and started flights to Reno–Tahoe International Airport, also in Nevada, and Nashville International Airport in Tennessee. Also on that day, Volaris added flights to El Salvador. On January 1, 2024, New Pacific Airlines ended flights to Las Vegas and subsequently discontinued all scheduled service altogether.

== Facilities ==
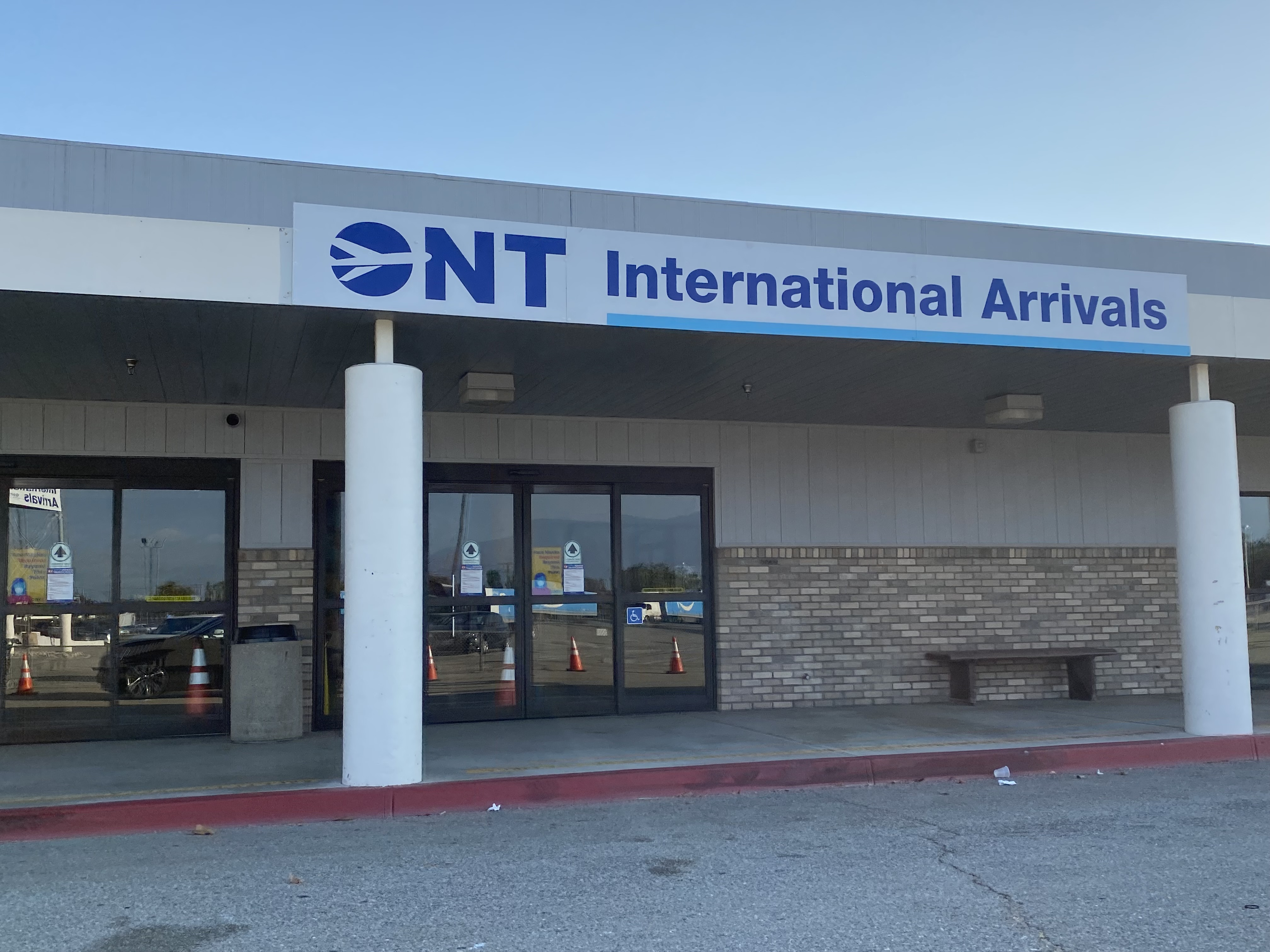
International Arrivals Facility

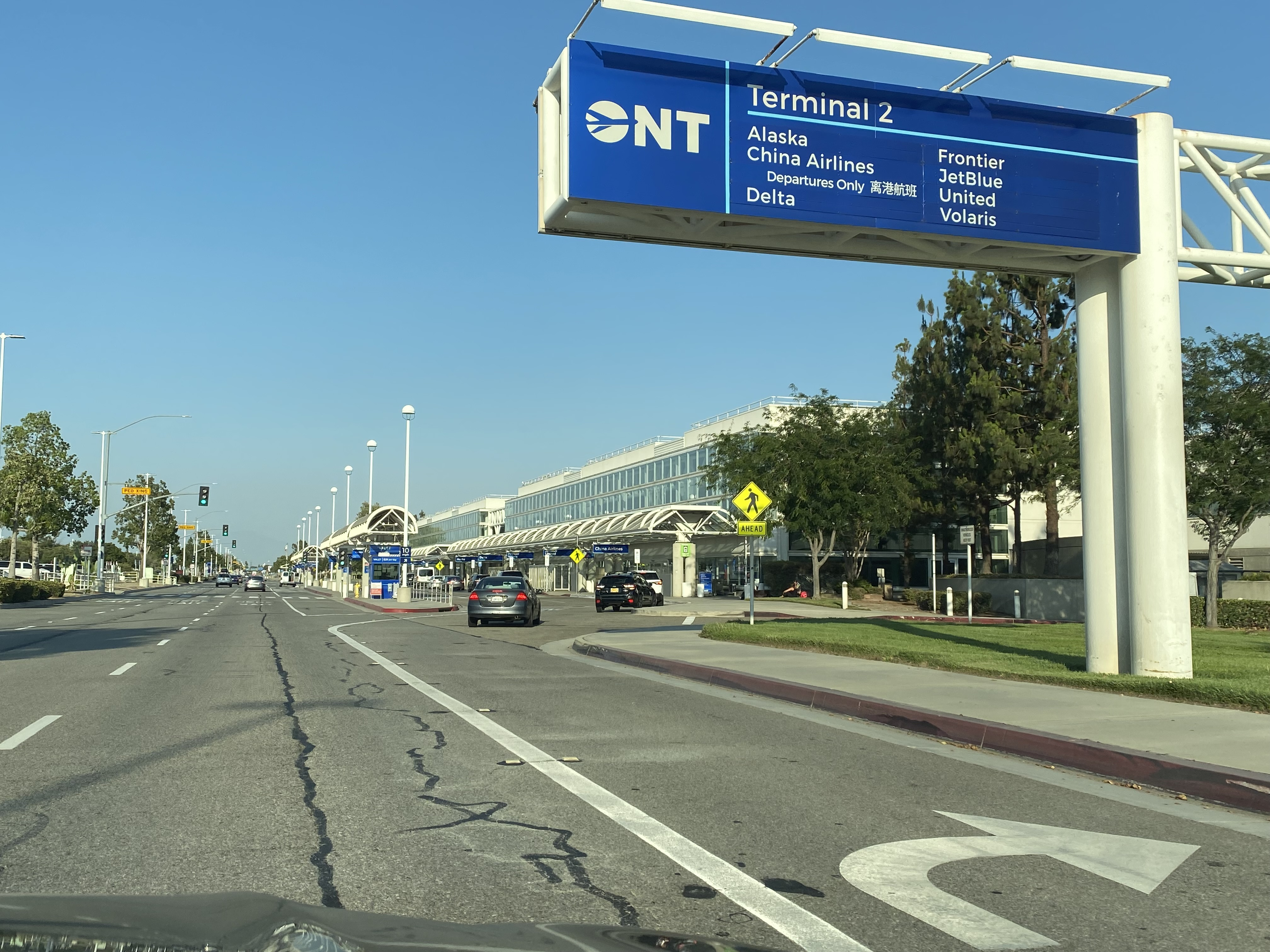
Terminal 2

=== Terminals ===
Ontario International Airport has two terminals with 26 gates and a separate adjacent international arrivals facility with 2 arrival-only gates, totaling 28 gates.

Terminal 2 has 265,000 sq ft (24,600 m^{2}) and 12 gates. Alaska Airlines, Avianca El Salvador, China Airlines, Delta Air Lines, Frontier Airlines, United Airlines, and Volaris are located in Terminal 2.

Terminal 4 has 265,000 sq ft (24,600 m^{2}) and 14 gates. American Airlines, JetBlue, Starlux Airlines, and Southwest Airlines are located in Terminal 4.

The international arrivals facility has two gates for arrivals only, containing the airport's U.S. Customs and Border Protection facility. International flights depart from the main terminals. Avianca, China Airlines, Starlux Airlines, and Volaris are the only airlines with international arrivals that operate this terminal.

A USO is housed in the old terminal complex near the international arrivals facility.

Remote parking is located on the east end of the airport (moved from its former location at the west end). On the east end is a ground transportation center that consolidates the rental car companies in one central location. The Omnitrans 61 bus traverses the airport, providing connections to each of the terminals, rental car and remote parking lots, and public transit stops.

General aviation is located at the south side of the airport, although most general-aviation pilots tend to use a number of nearby airports: Redlands Municipal Airport, Chino Airport, Brackett Field in La Verne, Cable Airport in Upland, or San Bernardino International Airport.

=== Curfew and noise restrictions ===
Ontario has few noise restrictions/abatement rules, unlike other Southern California airports, such as John Wayne Airport, Hollywood Burbank Airport (Bob Hope), Long Beach Airport, and San Diego International Airport, which all have very strict policies. The airport is allowed to operate 24/7, but during the hours of 22:00 to 07:00, all aircraft must arrive from the east on runway 26L or 26R and take off to the east on runway 8R or 8L, depending on ATC instruction. This procedure is known as "Contra-Flow" operations and applies to turbojet or turbofan aircraft. This procedure is similar to the one employed by LAX, where all landings are conducted from the east and all takeoffs are to the west (known as "over-ocean" operations) between 00:00 and 06:30. Both of these procedures are employed as long as weather and/or construction activity permits. This is done in an effort to be better neighbors and minimize the noise impact to the surrounding communities as much as possible. Residents of cities west of the airport have complained of increased noise as a result of the airport's refusal to abide by noise abatement rules.

== Ground transportation ==
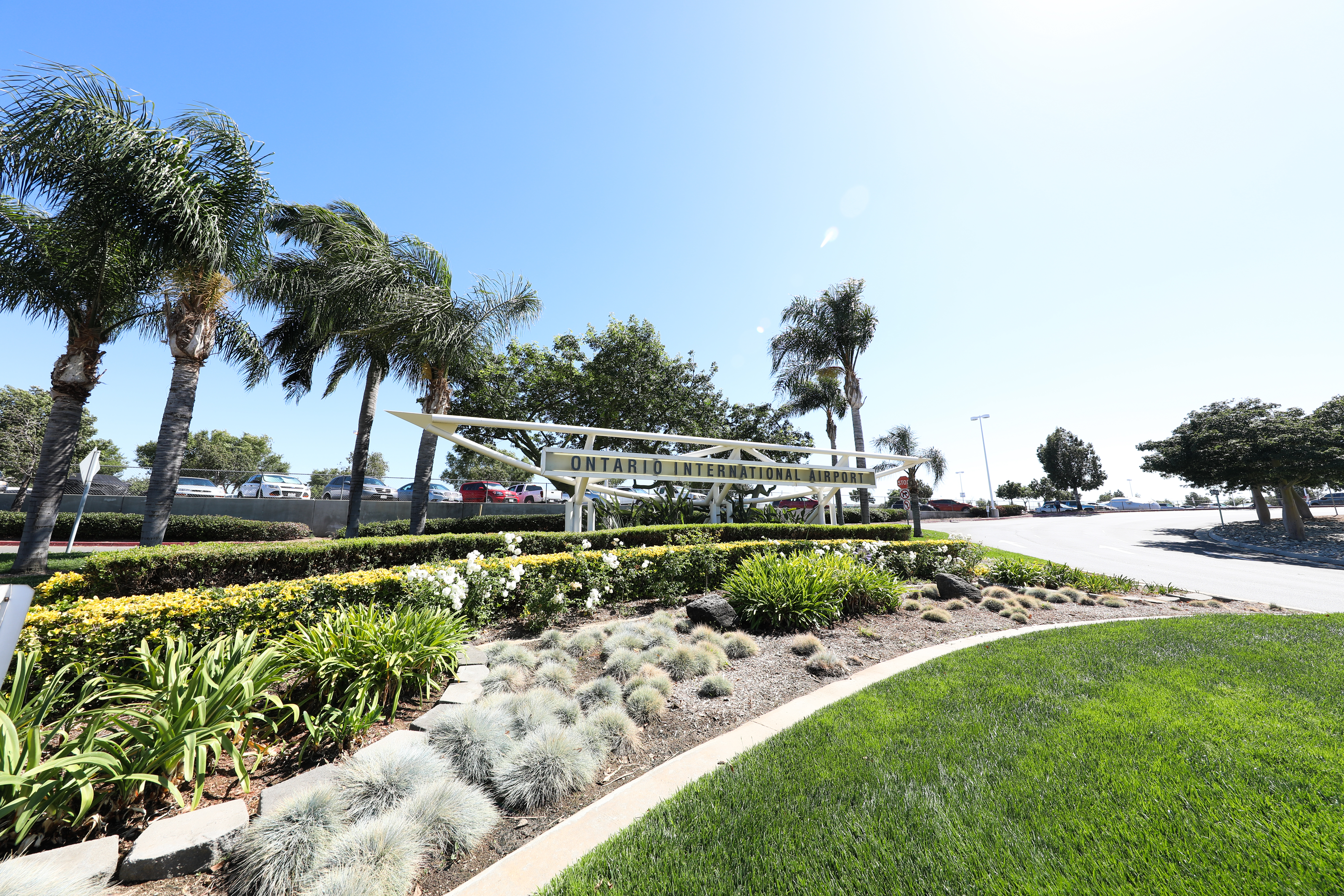
Ground entrance

The airport is located about 38 miles (61 km) east of downtown Los Angeles, 18 miles (29 km) west of downtown San Bernardino, and 14 miles (23 km) northwest of downtown Riverside. Motorists can use the San Bernardino Freeway (Interstate 10), Ontario Freeway (Interstate 15), or the Pomona Freeway (State Route 60).

Omnitrans, San Bernardino County's main public transportation agency, operates three routes near the airport. Route 380, also called ONT Connect, provides non-stop daily service every 35 to 60 minutes between the airport and Rancho Cucamonga station, where passengers can connect to Metrolink's San Bernardino Line, which operates daily with service to Los Angeles Union Station. Route 61 operates daily between Pomona–Downtown station, Ontario station, the airport, and Fontana station. Both routes 61 and 380 operate from stops located east of baggage claim at terminals 2 and 4. Route 81 operates Monday through Saturday on Haven Avenue which runs along the eastern edge of the airport between Chaffey College and Ontario–East station, where passengers can connect to Metrolink's Riverside Line, which operates during weekday peak periods.

=== Future ===
==== Ontario Connector Project ====
As a cost-effective solution compared to the proposed extension of the Foothill Extension project from the Montclair Transit Center to Ontario International Airport, estimated at around $1–1.5 billion, the SBCTA and the airport were in the process of trying to implement a tunnel with autonomous, zero-emission vehicles on an on-demand basis from the Metrolink San Bernardino Line's Rancho Cucamonga station to Ontario International Airport.

Initially, The Boring Company proposed constructing a single 2.8-mile (4.5 km) tunnel similar to the Las Vegas Convention Center Loop that would cost $60 million. The company eventually dropped out of the project because they refused to submit another refined proposal.

The SBCTA moved forward with plans on the project. The new plans for the project included two 4.2-mile (6.8 km) tunnels that would cost roughly $492 million. The SBCTA selected HNTB as their new contractor to design, build, and maintain the project.

As of October 2024, the proposed route followed a reversed L-shaped alignment consisting of the Rancho Cucamonga Metrolink station, Milliken Avenue, and East Airport Drive towards Ontario International Airport.

However, the project was canceled by the SBCTA board of directors at its December 3, 2025 board meeting due to escalating costs.

==== California High-Speed Rail ====
The California High-Speed Rail Authority is proposing a California High-Speed Rail station at the airport. The stop would be part of the second phase of the project that would extend the line from Los Angeles south to San Diego.

== Airlines and destinations ==
=== Passenger ===
Airlines	Destinations	Refs
Alaska Airlines	Boise, Honolulu, Portland (OR), Santa Rosa, Seattle/Tacoma	
American Airlines	Charlotte, Chicago–O'Hare (resumes December 17, 2026), Dallas/Fort Worth, Phoenix–Sky Harbor	
American Eagle	Phoenix–Sky Harbor	
Avianca El Salvador	San Salvador	
China Airlines	Taipei–Taoyuan	
Delta Air Lines	Atlanta, Salt Lake City	
Delta Connection	Salt Lake City, Seattle/Tacoma	
Frontier Airlines	Denver, Houston–Intercontinental, Las Vegas, San Francisco, Seattle/Tacoma; Seasonal: Dallas/Fort Worth	
JetBlue	Seasonal: New York–JFK	
Southwest Airlines	Austin, Chicago–Midway, Dallas–Love, Denver, Honolulu, Houston–Hobby, Las Vegas, Nashville, Oakland, Phoenix–Sky Harbor, Sacramento, San Jose (CA)	
Starlux Airlines	Taipei–Taoyuan	
United Airlines	Chicago–O'Hare, Denver, Houston–Intercontinental, San Francisco	
United Express	San Francisco	
Volaris	Guadalajara, León/Del Bajío, Morelia	

=== Cargo ===
Airlines	Destinations
Alpine Air Express	Oxnard
Amazon Air	Atlanta, Austin, Baltimore, Charlotte, Chicago/Rockford, Cincinnati, Dallas/Fort Worth, Denver, Fort Worth/Alliance, Hartford, Honolulu, Kailua-Kona, Lakeland, Lihue, Miami, Minneapolis/St. Paul, Portland (OR), Seattle/Tacoma, St. Louis, Wilmington (OH)
Ameriflight	Bakersfield, Blythe, Burbank, Fresno, Imperial/El Centro, Lancaster, Mojave, Oxnard, Palm Springs, San Luis Obispo, Visalia
Amerijet International	Miami, San Juan
Atlas Air	Baltimore, Cincinnati, Fort Worth/Alliance, Kahului, Kailua-Kona
FedEx Express	Fort Worth/Alliance, Indianapolis, Memphis, Newark, Oakland
FedEx Feeder	Bakersfield, Bishop, Inyokern, San Luis Obispo, Santa Barbara, Santa Maria
Kalitta Air	Seasonal: Honolulu, Philadelphia
UPS Airlines	Albuquerque, Anchorage, Billings, Boise, Boston, Chicago–O'Hare, Chicago/Rockford, Dallas/Fort Worth, Denver, El Paso, Fresno, Greensboro, Hartford, Honolulu, Kahului, Kailua-Kona, Los Angeles, Louisville, Miami, Newark, Oakland, Orlando, Philadelphia, Phoenix–Sky Harbor, Portland (OR), Reno/Tahoe, Sacramento–Mather, Salt Lake City, San Bernardino, San Diego, Seattle–Boeing, Spokane; Seasonal: Houston–Intercontinental, Lansing, Manchester (NH), New York–JFK, Providence, San Antonio, Sioux Falls, Tampa

== Statistics ==
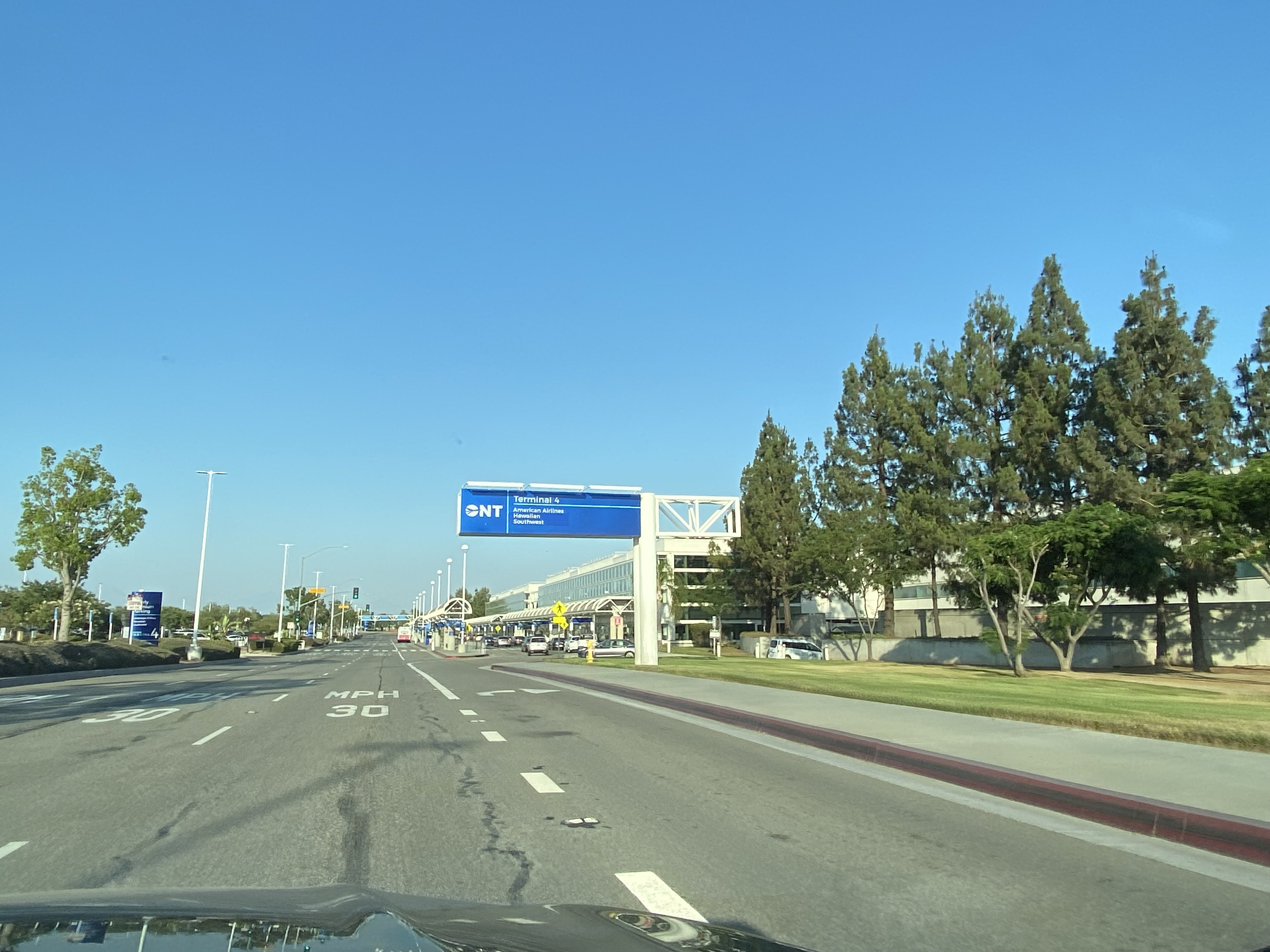
Terminal 4.

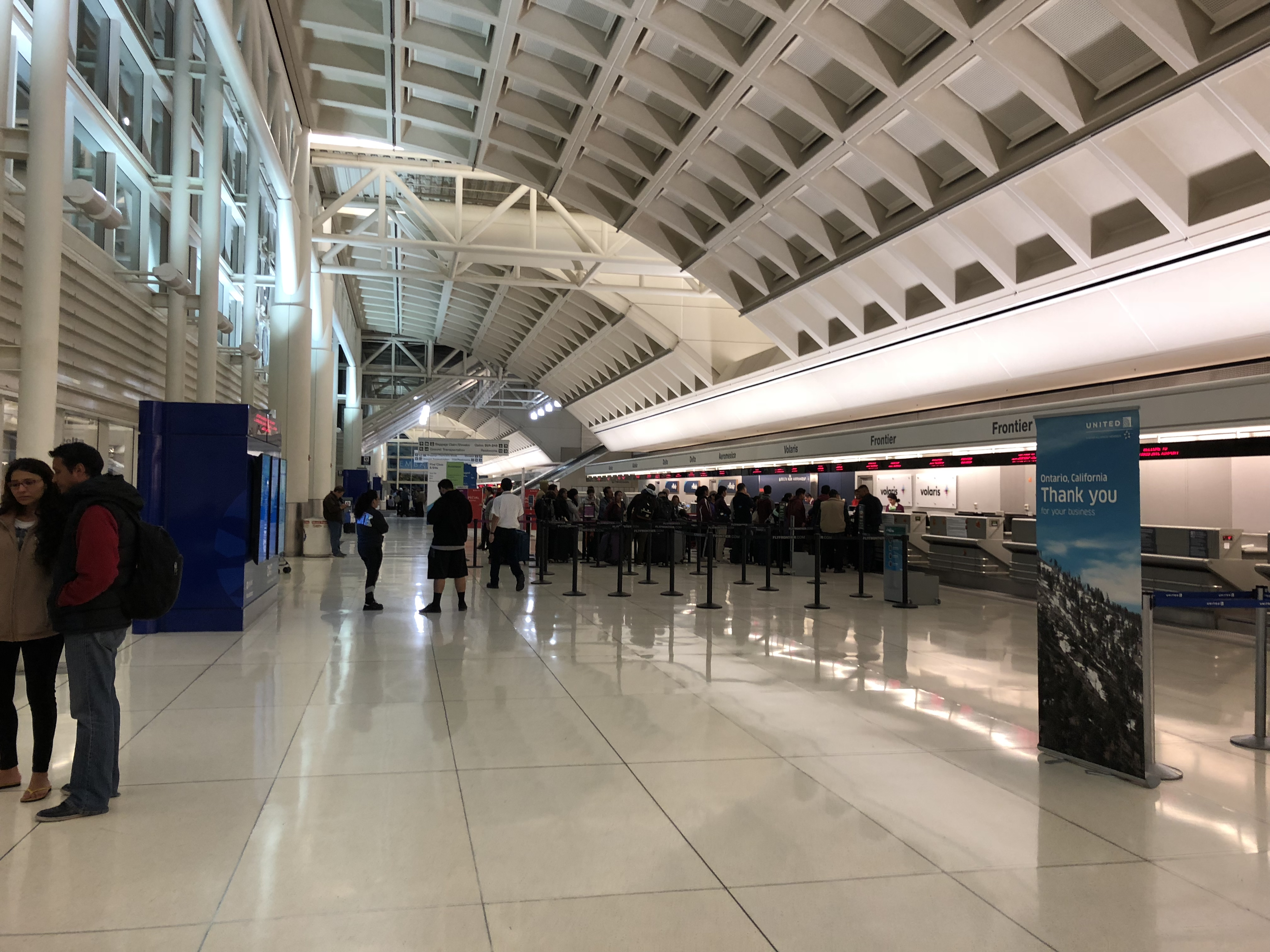
Check-in counters at Terminal 2.

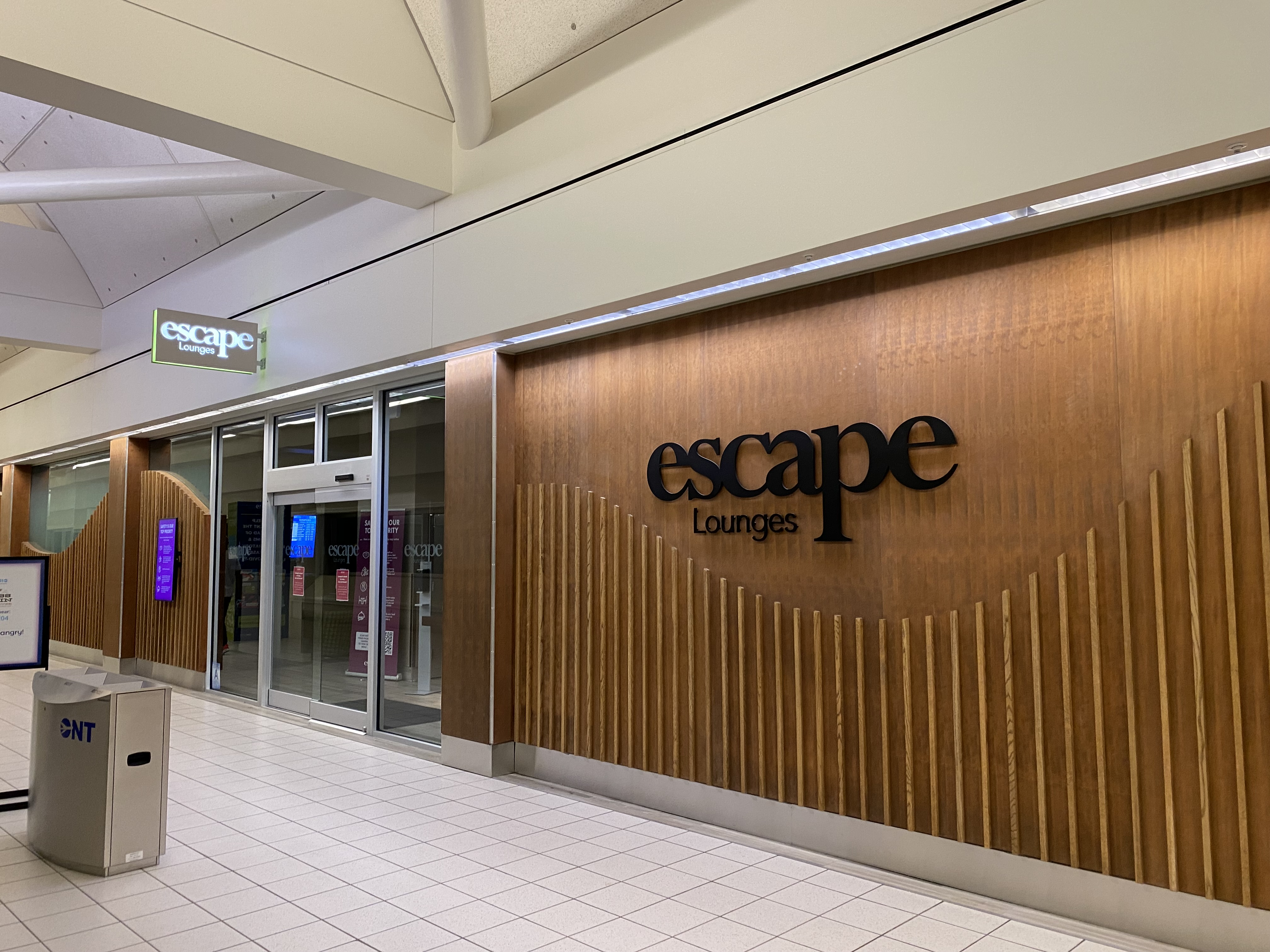
Escape Lounge at the airport.

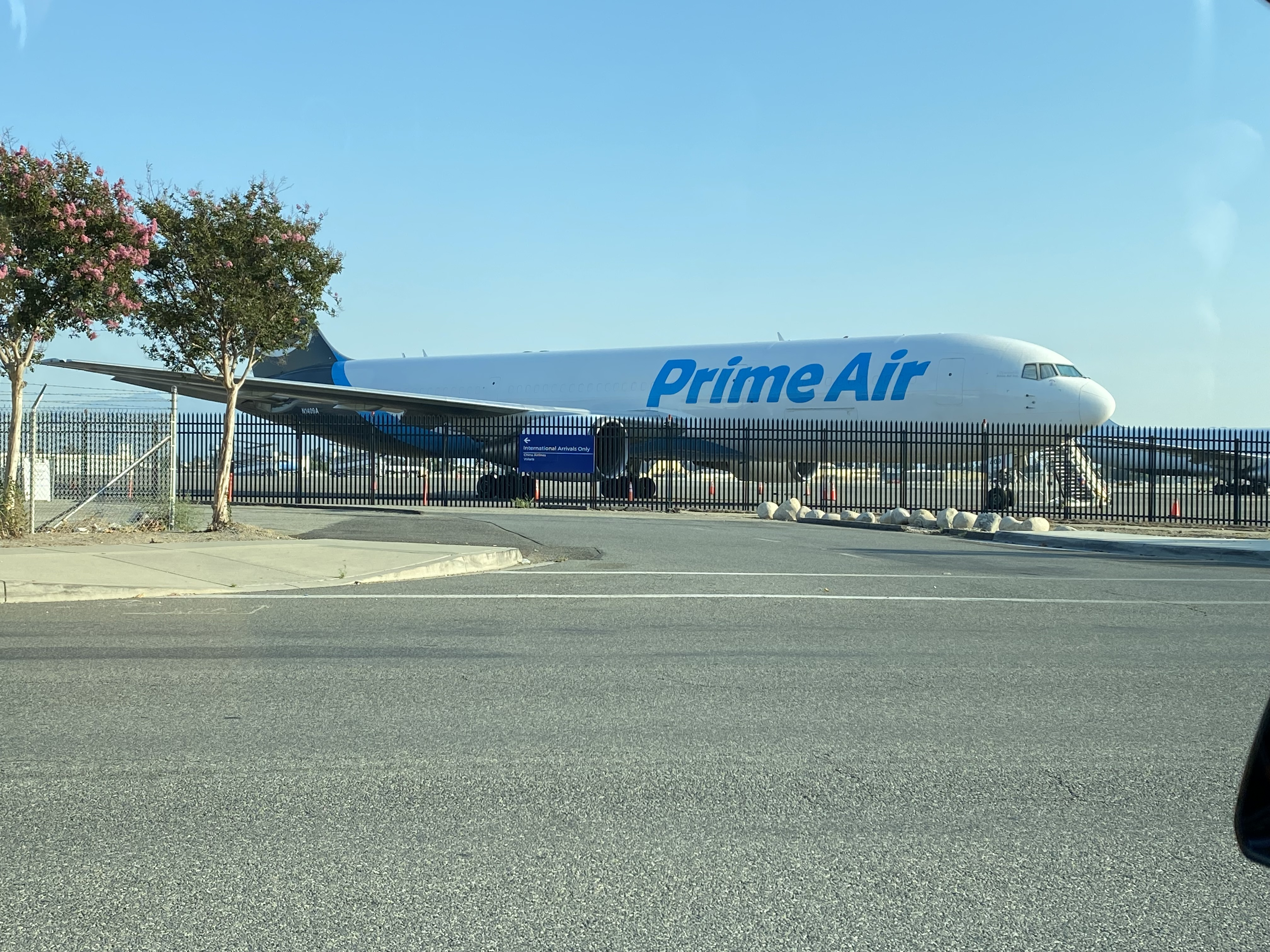
Amazon Prime Air Boeing 767-300F at the airport.

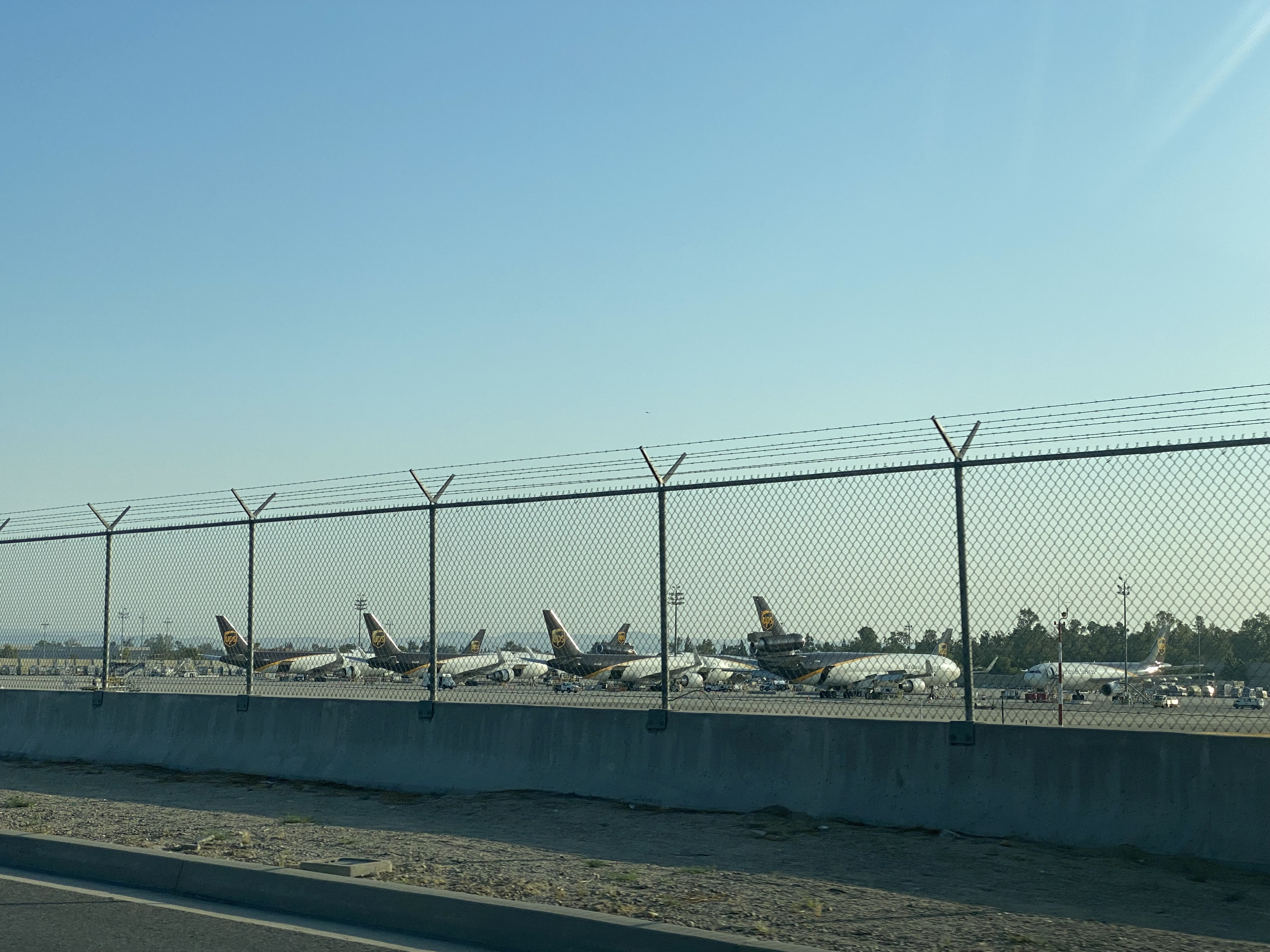
UPS Airlines airplanes at the airport's cargo terminal.

=== Top destinations ===
Busiest domestic routes (August 2025 – July 2026)
Rank	Airport	Passengers	Carriers
1	Dallas/Fort Worth, Texas	366,668	American, Frontier
2	Denver, Colorado	357,932	Frontier, Southwest, United
3	Phoenix–Sky Harbor, Arizona	340,110	American, Frontier, Southwest
4	Las Vegas, Nevada	273,063	Frontier, Southwest
5	Seattle/Tacoma, Washington	268,921	Alaska, Delta, Frontier
6	Sacramento, California	198,851	Frontier, Southwest
7	Atlanta, Georgia	151,948	Delta
8	San Francisco, California	147,955	Frontier, United
9	Oakland, California	135,161	Southwest
10	San Jose, California	120,844	Southwest

Busiest international routes (August 2025 – July 2026)
Rank	Airport	Passengers	Carriers
1	Taipei–Taoyuan, Taiwan	290,733	China Airlines, Starlux
2	Guadalajara, Mexico	234,583	Volaris
3	San Salvador, El Salvador	51,693	Avianca
4	Morelia, Mexico	36,732	Volaris
5	León, Mexico	32,512	Volaris
6	San José del Cabo, Mexico	25,801	Volaris

=== Airline market share ===
Largest airlines by passengers (August 2025 – July 2026)
Rank	Airline	Passengers	Share
1	Southwest Airlines	2,564,340	36.5%
2	American Airlines	1,067,478	15.2%
3	Alaska Airlines	705,896	10.0%
4	Delta Air Lines	662,654	9.4%
5	Frontier Airlines	655,317	9.3%
	Other airlines	1,400,000	19.6%

=== Annual traffic ===
Annual passenger traffic (enplaned + deplaned) at ONT, 1992 through 2025
Year	Passengers	Year	Passengers	Year	Passengers	Year	Passengers
1992	6,121,623	2002	6,516,858	2012	4,318,994	2022	5,740,593
1993	6,192,035	2003	6,547,877	2013	3,969,974	2023	6,430,033
1994	6,386,000	2004	6,937,337	2014	4,127,278	2024	7,084,864
1995	6,405,097	2005	7,213,528	2015	4,209,311	2025	7,116,735
1996	6,252,838	2006	7,049,904	2016	4,217,366	2026	
1997	6,300,862	2007	7,207,150	2017	4,552,225	2027	
1998	6,434,858	2008	6,232,761	2018	5,115,894	2028	
1999	6,578,005	2009	4,886,695	2019	5,583,732	2029	
2000	6,756,086	2010	4,808,241	2020	2,538,482	2030	
2001	6,702,400	2011	4,551,875	2021	4,496,592	2031	

== Accidents and incidents ==
- On December 25, 1945, a USAAF Douglas C-47 Skytrain was stolen by two non-pilot ground crew members. It crashed four miles east of the airport, killing both occupants.
- On January 15, 1969, a Pacific Southwest Airlines Boeing 727-100, N973PS, collided with a Cessna 182 Skylane N42242 while it was climbing to its cruising altitude. Both aircraft were in controlled airspace on the same frequency. The 727 continued on to Ontario, California. and made a safe landing. The right wing of the Cessna was damaged, so it returned to San Francisco. There were no fatalities on either aircraft.
- On March 31, 1971, Western Airlines Flight 366, a Boeing 720 on a training flight, crashed on approach to Ontario during a three-engine ILS approach in limited visibility due to a loss of left rudder control. All five occupants on board were killed.
- On January 9, 1975, Golden West Airlines Flight 261, a De Havilland Twin Otter DHC-6 en route to Los Angeles collided with a Cessna 150 near Whittier. Four crew and twelve passengers on the two aircraft were killed.
