= Amtrak paint schemes =

History of paint schemes applied to Amtrak locomotives and rail cars

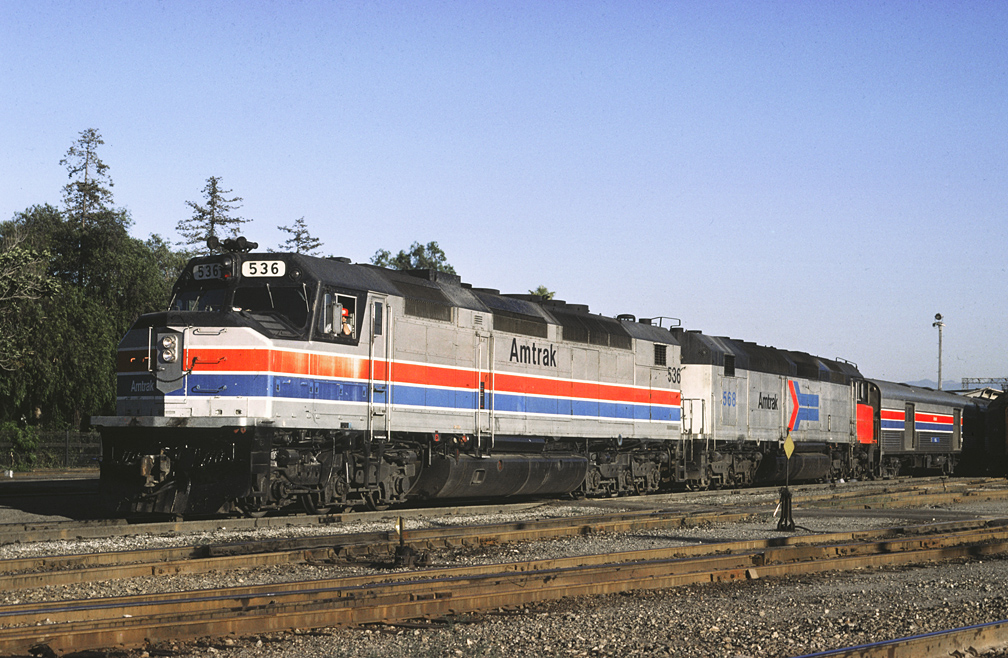
Amtrak's livery has included a variety of designs, most based on a red, white, and blue color scheme. The lead locomotive here is in Phase II livery, while the trailing locomotive is still in Phase I.

Amtrak has used a variety of paint schemes (liveries) on its rolling stock since taking over intercity passenger rail service in the United States in 1971. A series of seven schemes termed Phases, first introduced in 1972, have seen the widest use. Phases primarily use geometric arrangements of red, white, and blue – the national colors of the United States – part of Amtrak's patriotic visual identity.

Amtrak began operations in May 1971 with a mixture of equipment still painted in the distinct colored liveries of the private railroads that relinquished their passenger service to Amtrak. The company retained the equipment that it determined to be in the best condition, and elected not to keep the same rolling stock on the same routes. Since this resulted in trains with mismatched liveries, which contrasted with the previous coordinated liveries, that period was later known as the Rainbow Era.

To build the brand of Amtrak as a unified passenger railroad, the rolling stock was gradually repainted into a new system-wide livery starting around 1972. Successive liveries are known as Phases and are sequentially numbered using Roman numerals – a nomenclature that began with model railroaders and was later officially adopted by Amtrak. Most current locomotives use Phase V and VII, while passenger cars use Phase VI and VII. A modified Phase III scheme was introduced for some equipment in 2013. Non-revenue equipment uses bright lime green or a variation of Phase V.

Some routes financially supported by individual states use service-specific liveries to provide a more regionalized distinction. These include the three Amtrak California routes, eight Amtrak Midwest services, the Cascades, and the Piedmont. Amtrak has repainted equipment in unique livery for special uses, including its 40th anniversary in 2011 and to promote the Operation Lifesaver safety campaign. Equipment has also been wrapped for advertising promotions. When testing equipment from other railroads, Amtrak has mostly kept existing livery, though some longer-term tests used Phase schemes.

== Rainbow Era ==
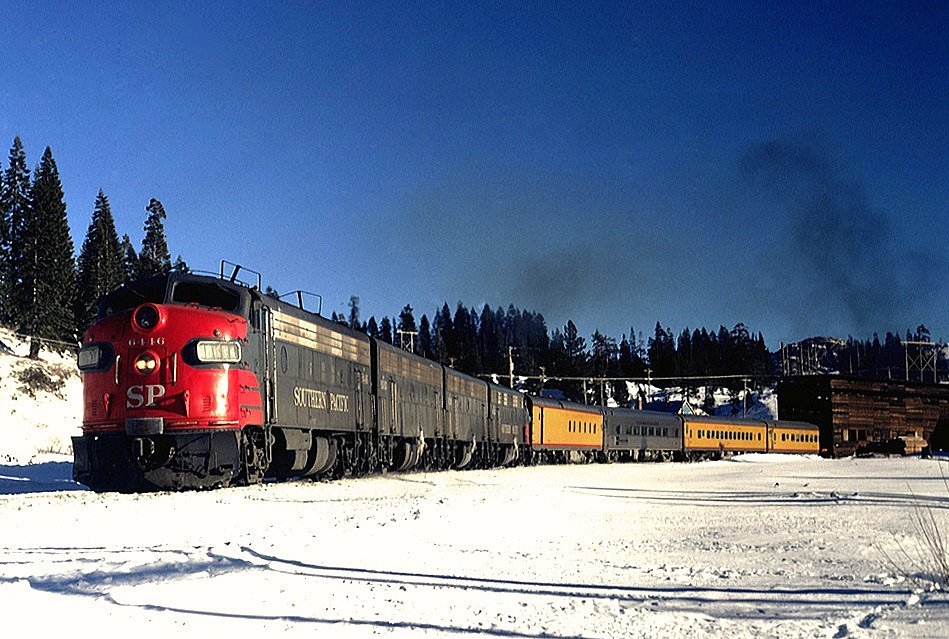
A "Rainbow Era" Amtrak train in 1971

When Amtrak took over intercity passenger rail service on May 1, 1971, it inherited a collection of rolling stock from twenty different railroads, each with its own distinct colors and logos. Operating only 184 of the 366 privately operated trains, Amtrak was able to pick the 1,200 best passenger cars to lease from the 3,000 that the private railroads owned. Equipment was used nationwide and did not always stay on predecessor routes, resulting in trains with the mismatched colors of several predecessor railroads. This "Rainbow Era" was short-lived; Amtrak began purchasing some of the leased equipment in mid-1971, setting the stage for wholesale repainting from 1972 to 1974 as the equipment was refurbished.

== Phase paint schemes ==
The Phase paint schemes have been used on most passengers equipment – locomotives, passenger cars, and trainsets – as well as some non-passenger cars and non-revenue equipment. Phase schemes generally have red, white, and blue on the sides of equipment, with black or gray sections around the wheels and roof to hide grime.

=== Phase I ===
Introduced in 1972, Phase I was the first paint scheme to be implemented system-wide on Amtrak's trains. It was the first new paint for most equipment under Amtrak, except for a small number of locomotives that had been painted into experimental and promotional paint schemes. The scheme was part of Amtrak's larger move to a visual identity featuring the national colors of red, white, and blue. Amtrak did not initially assign nomenclature for its livery; model railroaders began referring to this first paint scheme as Phase I and numbering all subsequent phases sequentially using Roman numerals. Amtrak later made the Phase numbering scheme the official terminology.

Locomotives in Phase I were painted light gray ("Platinum Mist") with a black roof, the Amtrak "Pointless Arrow" chevron logo on the side, and a red nose (which led to a "Bloody Nose" nickname). Passenger cars were silver (or left as bare stainless steel), with a red and bright blue stripe (bracketed by thin white stripes) at window level and the chevron logo at one or both ends. A number of variants were made for non-revenue locomotives, GG1 locomotives, Turbotrain and Turboliner trainsets, and self-propelled RDC and Metroliner railcars.

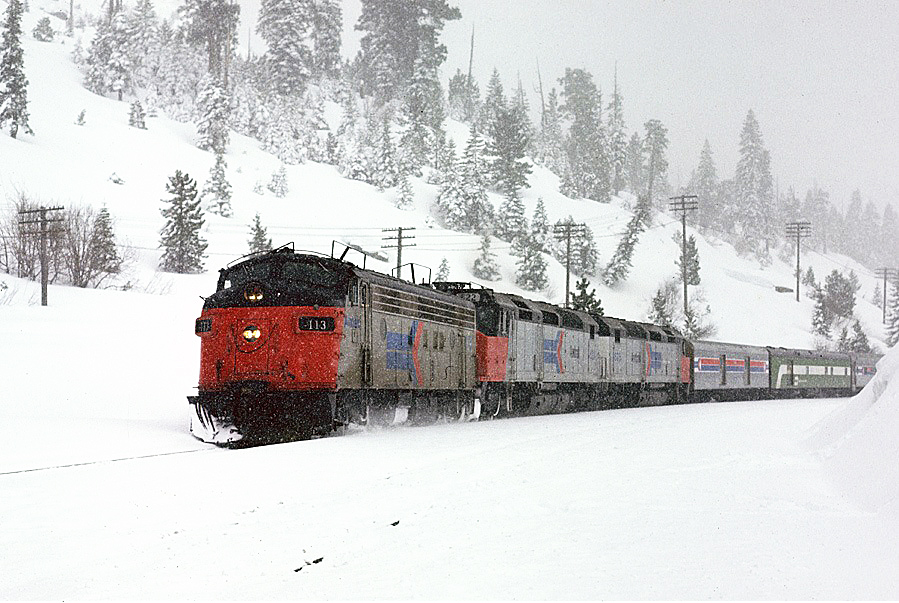
An EMD FP7 and two EMD SDP40Fs in 1975

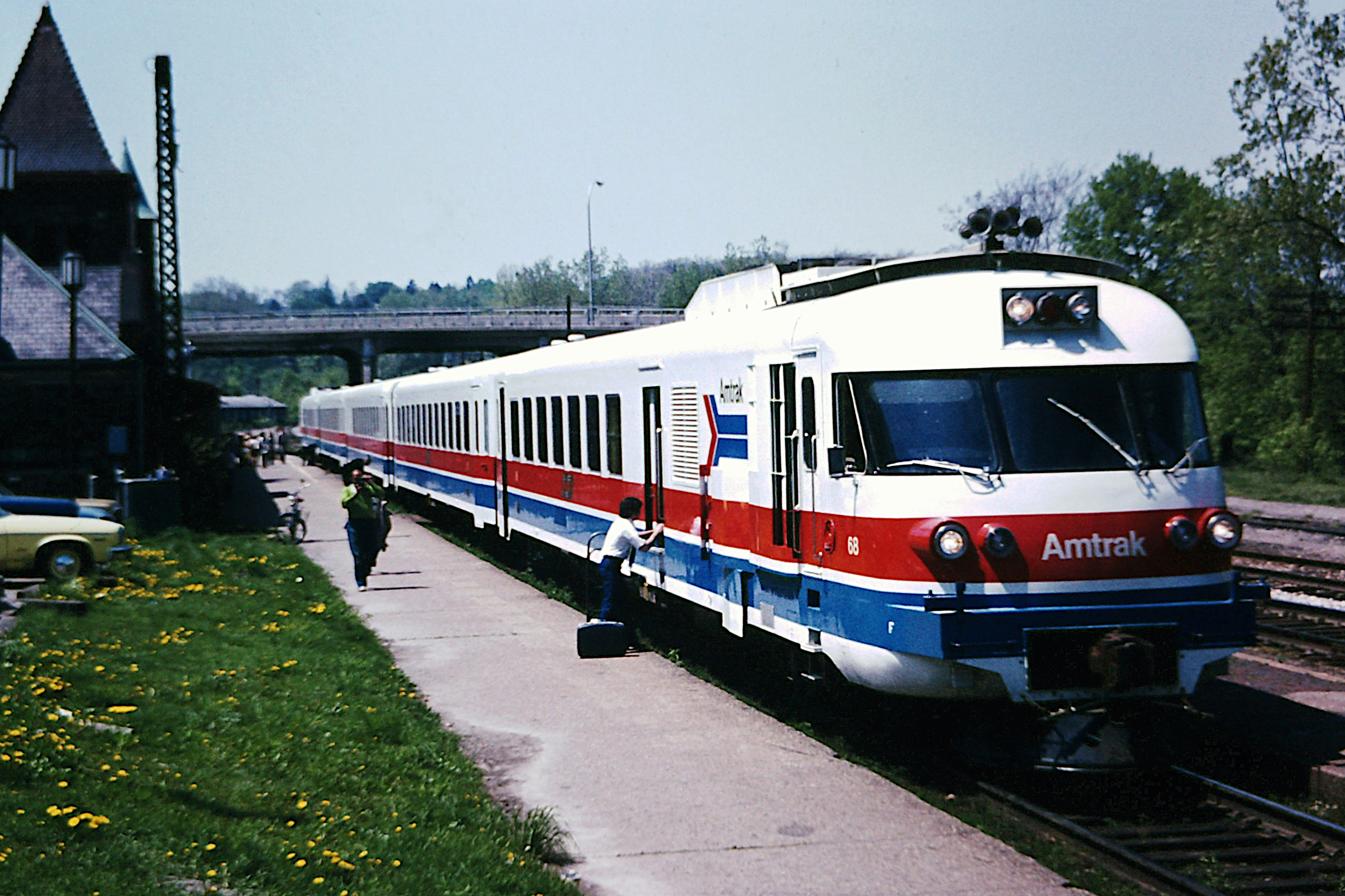
A Turboliner trainset in 1975

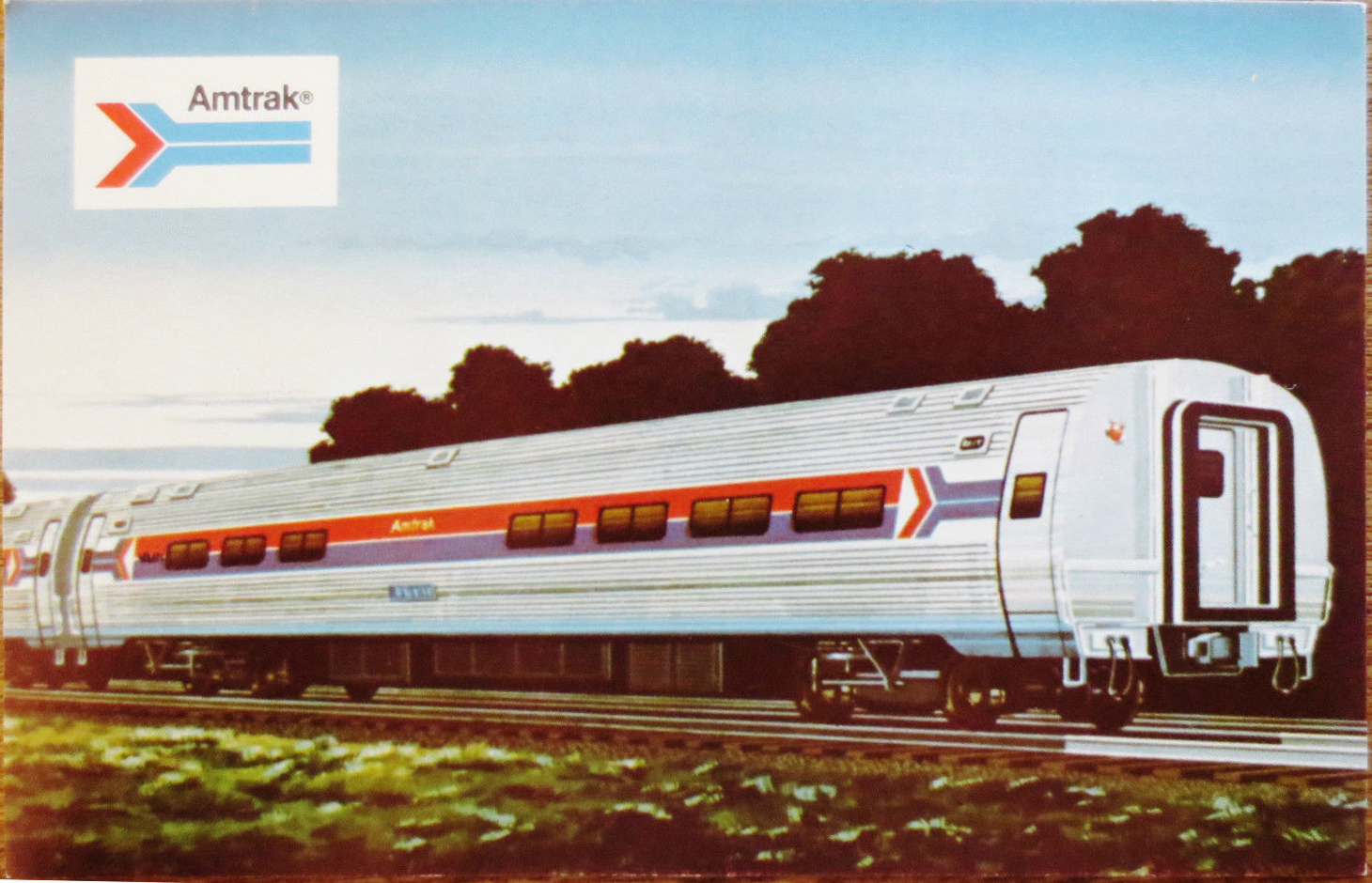
A circa-1975 postcard of an Amfleet I passenger car

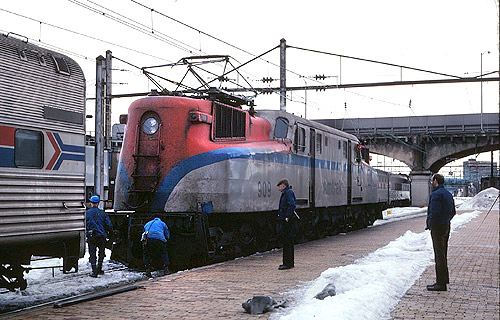
A GG1 locomotive in 1978

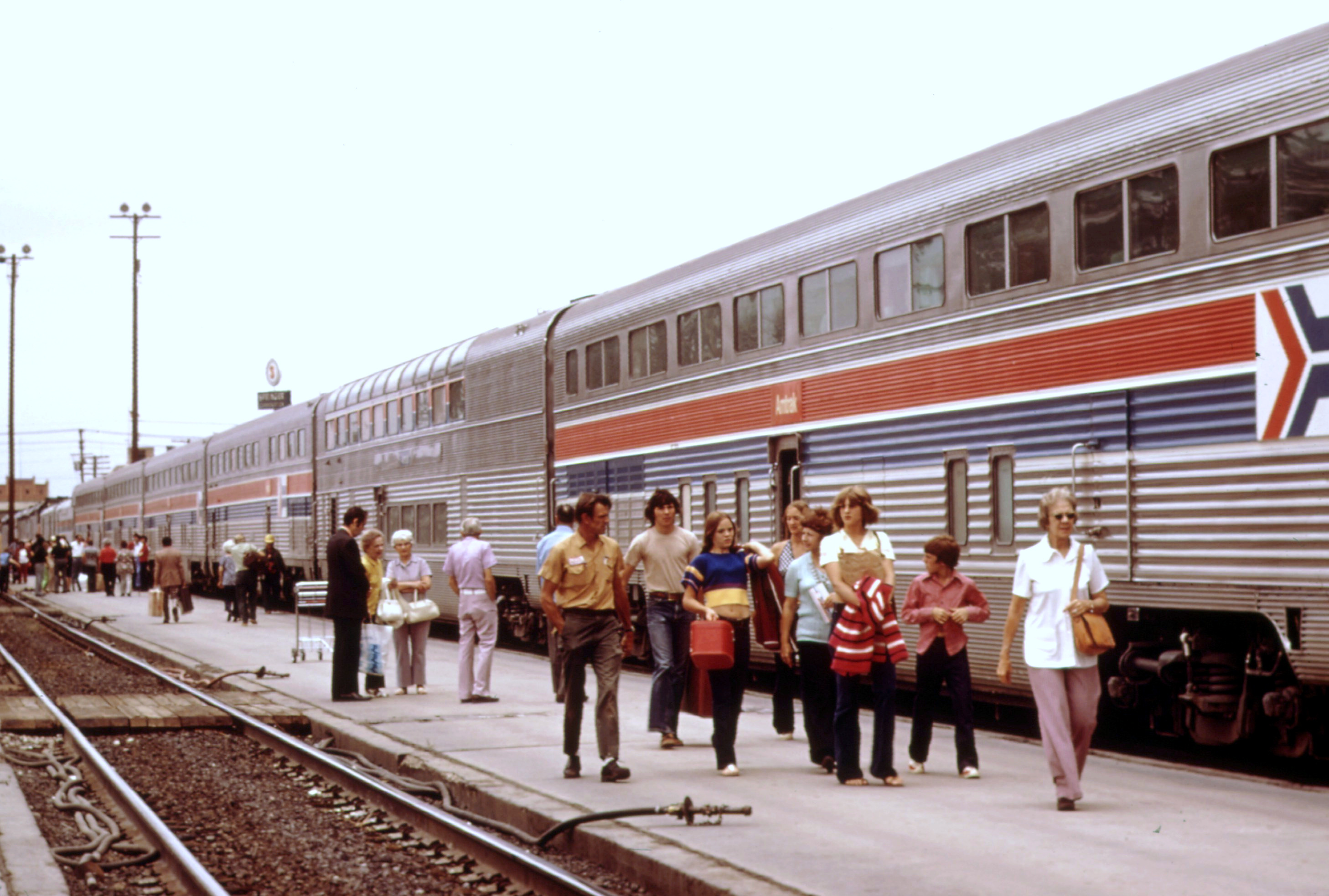
Hi-Level passenger cars in 1974

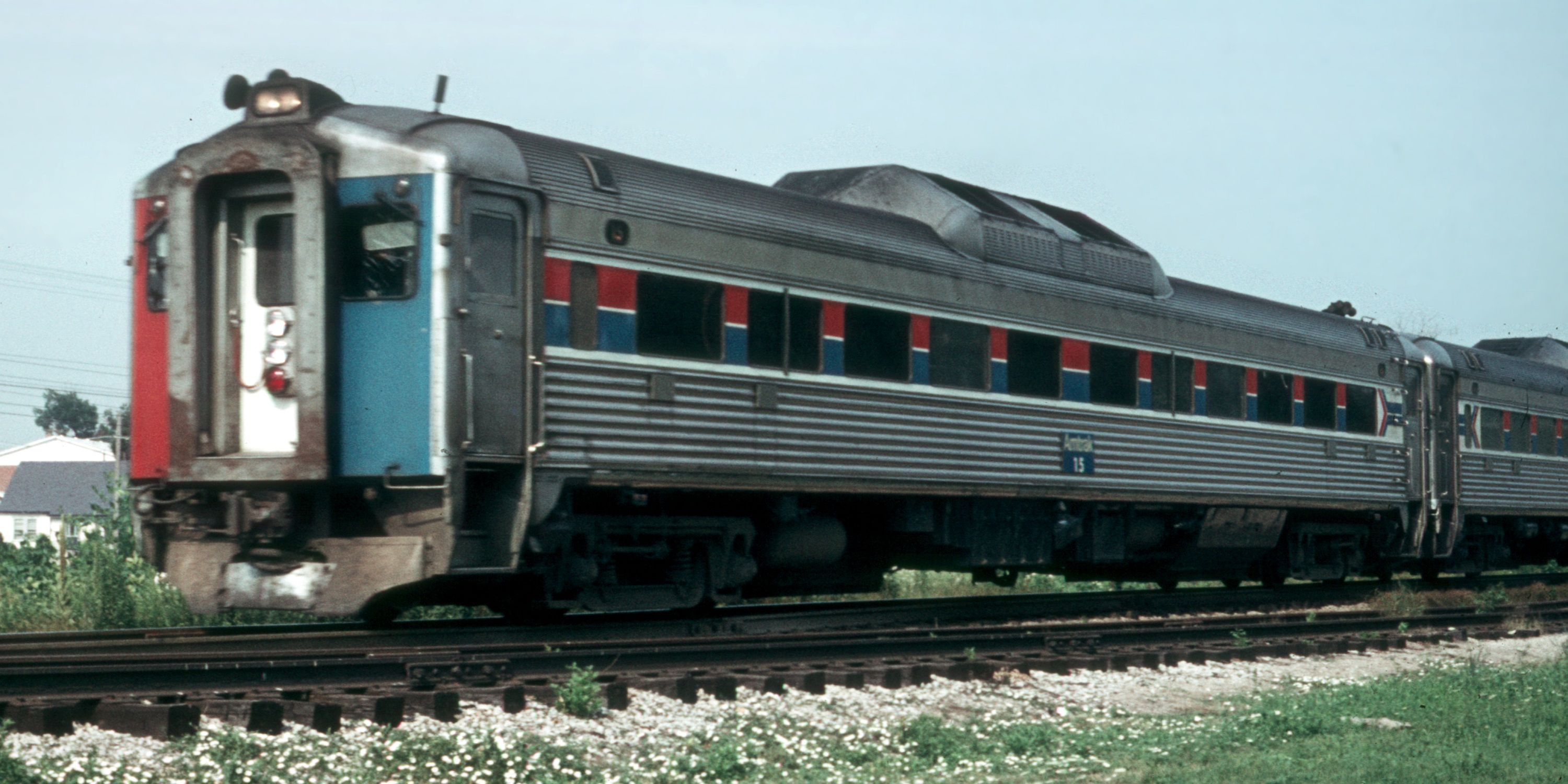
Rail Diesel Cars in 1975

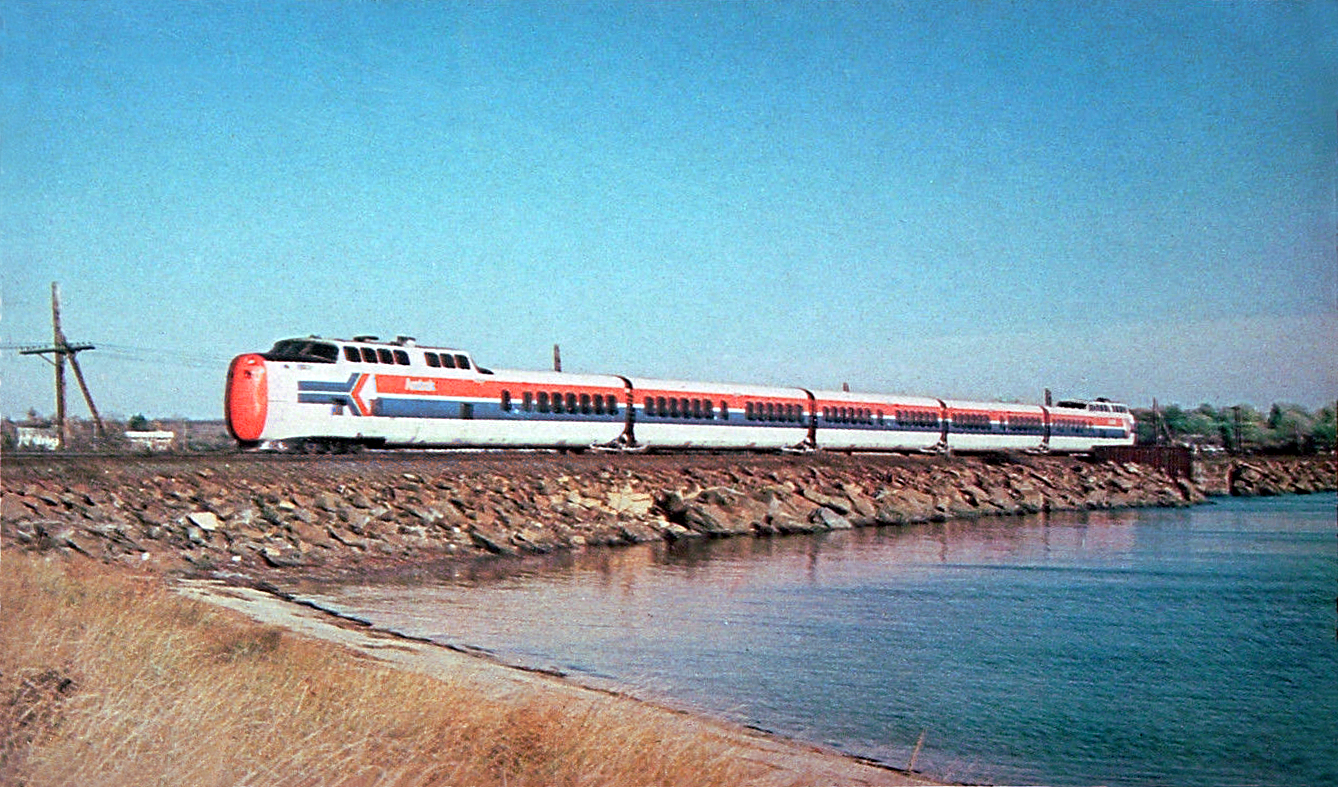
TurboTrain in 1974

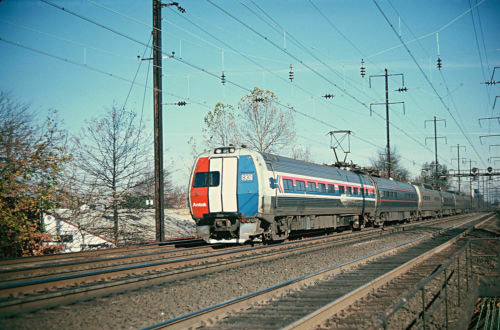
Metroliners in 1975

=== Phase II ===
Phase II was introduced in late 1974 with the arrival of the new GE E60 locomotives. The red nose and chevron logo on Phase I locomotives were replaced with the same stripes found on passenger cars, which wrapped around the nose of the locomotive. Locomotive roofs remained black. Most passenger cars were essentially unchanged from Phase I, except for the removal of the chevron logo; new Sightseer lounges had a higher stripe with an angled transition on each end.

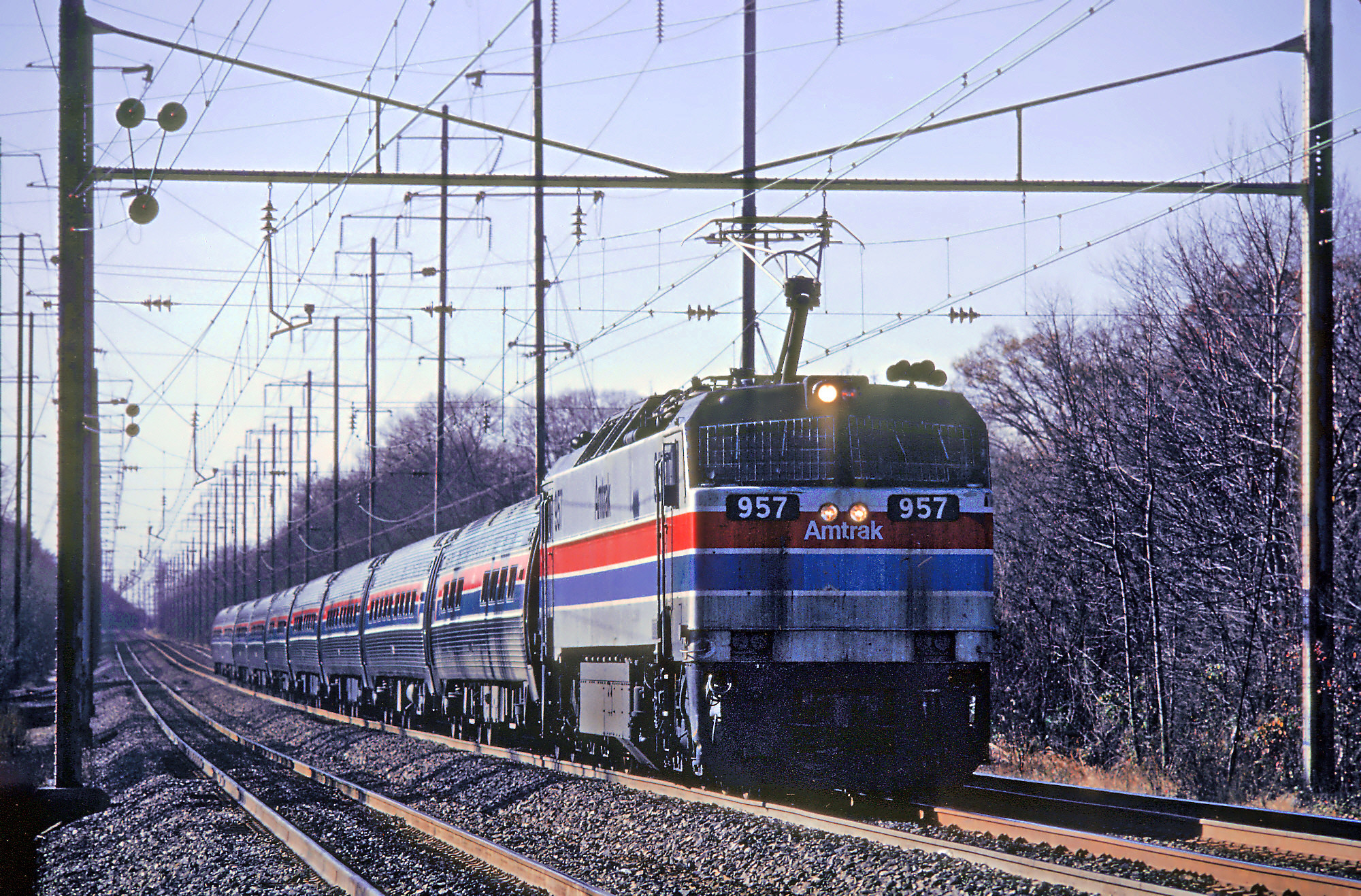
GE E60 locomotive in 1980

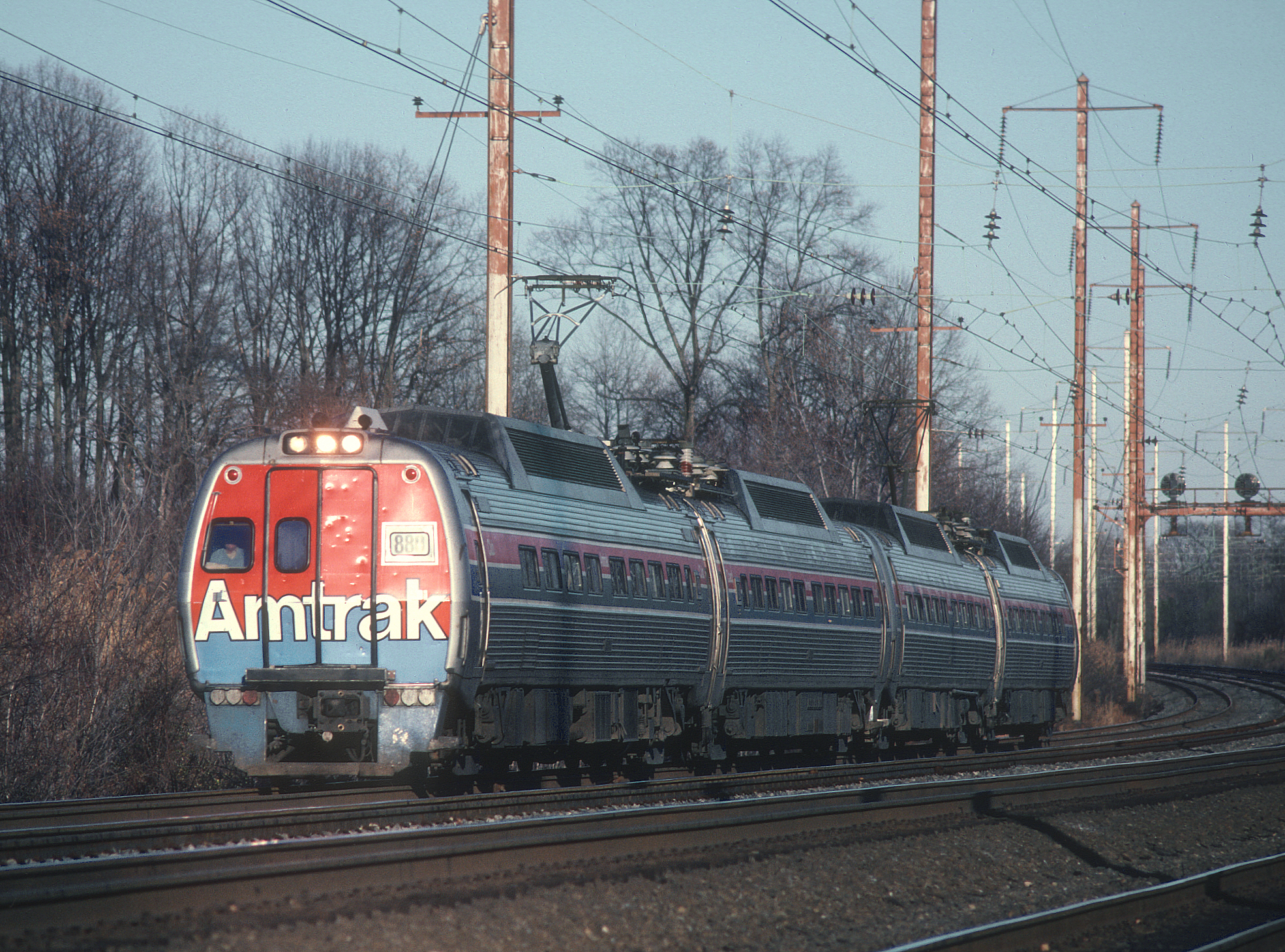
Metroliners in 1980

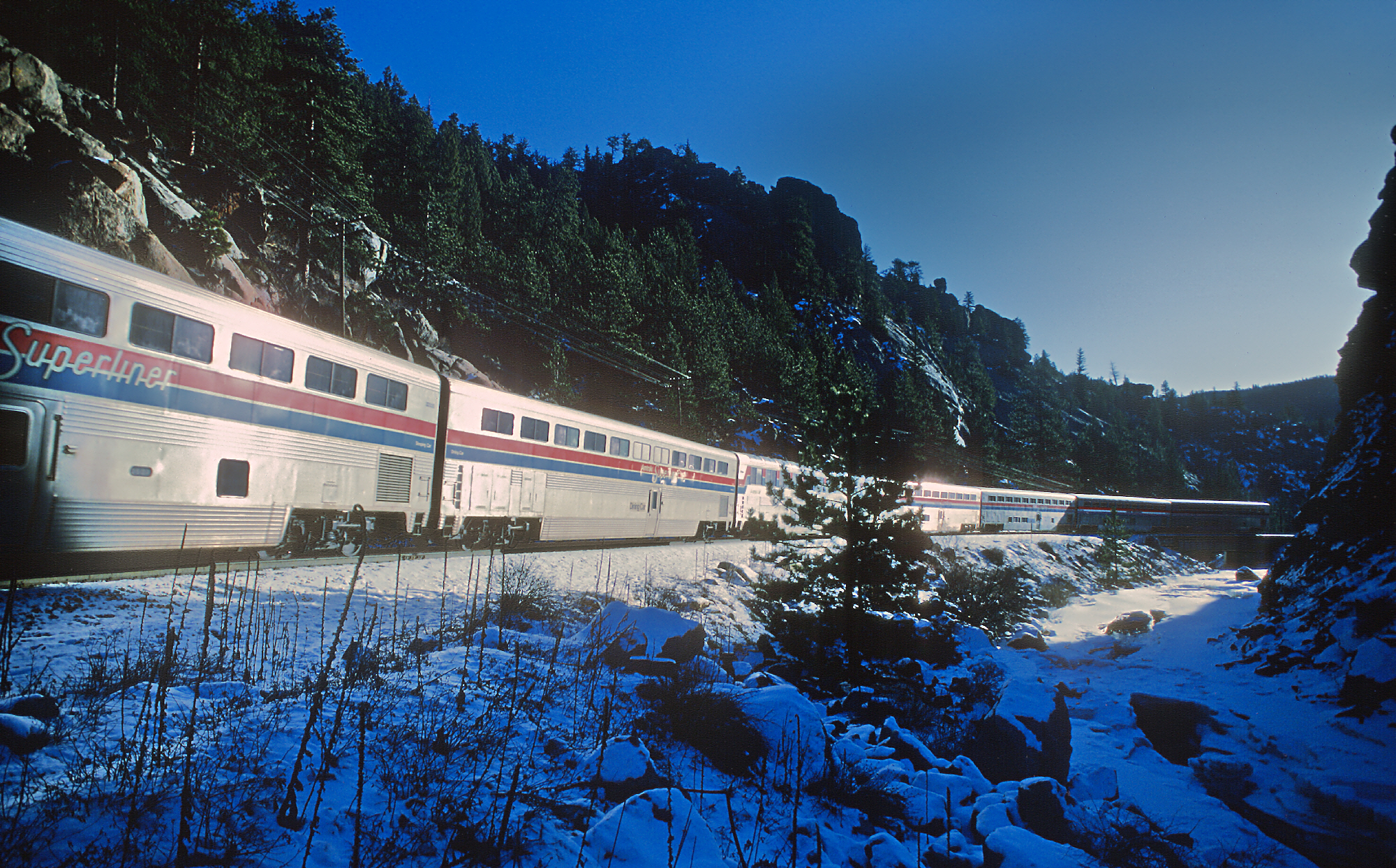
Superliner passenger cars in 1985

=== Phase III ===
Phase III, introduced in 1976, is still used on some equipment. On both passenger cars and locomotives, the outer white pinstripes were removed while the inner stripe was widened, resulting in red, white, and blue stripes of equal width. Turboliners and the LRC test train were painted in white, with the stripes at the bottom of the train. This scheme was introduced "for safety, graphic aid and saving money", as the white band was highly reflective and provided a place for car information, and the standard widths made better use of raw material.

Several types of locomotives that were acquired later were given variations on Phase III. AEM-7 locomotives had the blue stripe expanded to cover the entire lower part of the body. On Dash 8-32BWH locomotives, a deeper blue and red was used; the stripes had additional pinstripes and angled upward across the middle of the body. The similarity to the Pepsi logo led to the units being nicknamed "Pepsi Cans". Genesis locomotives had a lighter roof and narrower white stripe; the stripes angled downward on the sloped nose, and faded towards the rear. That variant was created by industrial designer Cesar Vergara, who also designed the angular bodies of the locomotives.

In October 2013, Amtrak introduced a new variant of Phase III with the production of the new Viewliner II cars, the first of which entered service in 2015. The Viewliner cars have some changes from previous Phase III passenger cars, including a red reflective stripe at the bottom and a newer ("Travelmark") logo. In January 2016, Amtrak repainted a P32AC-DM locomotive in Phase III, similar to that of the heritage units Nos. 145 and 822, but featuring modern logos and "Empire Service" emblems on the sides. All P32AC-DMs were repainted into this scheme, with costs shared between Amtrak and the state of New York.

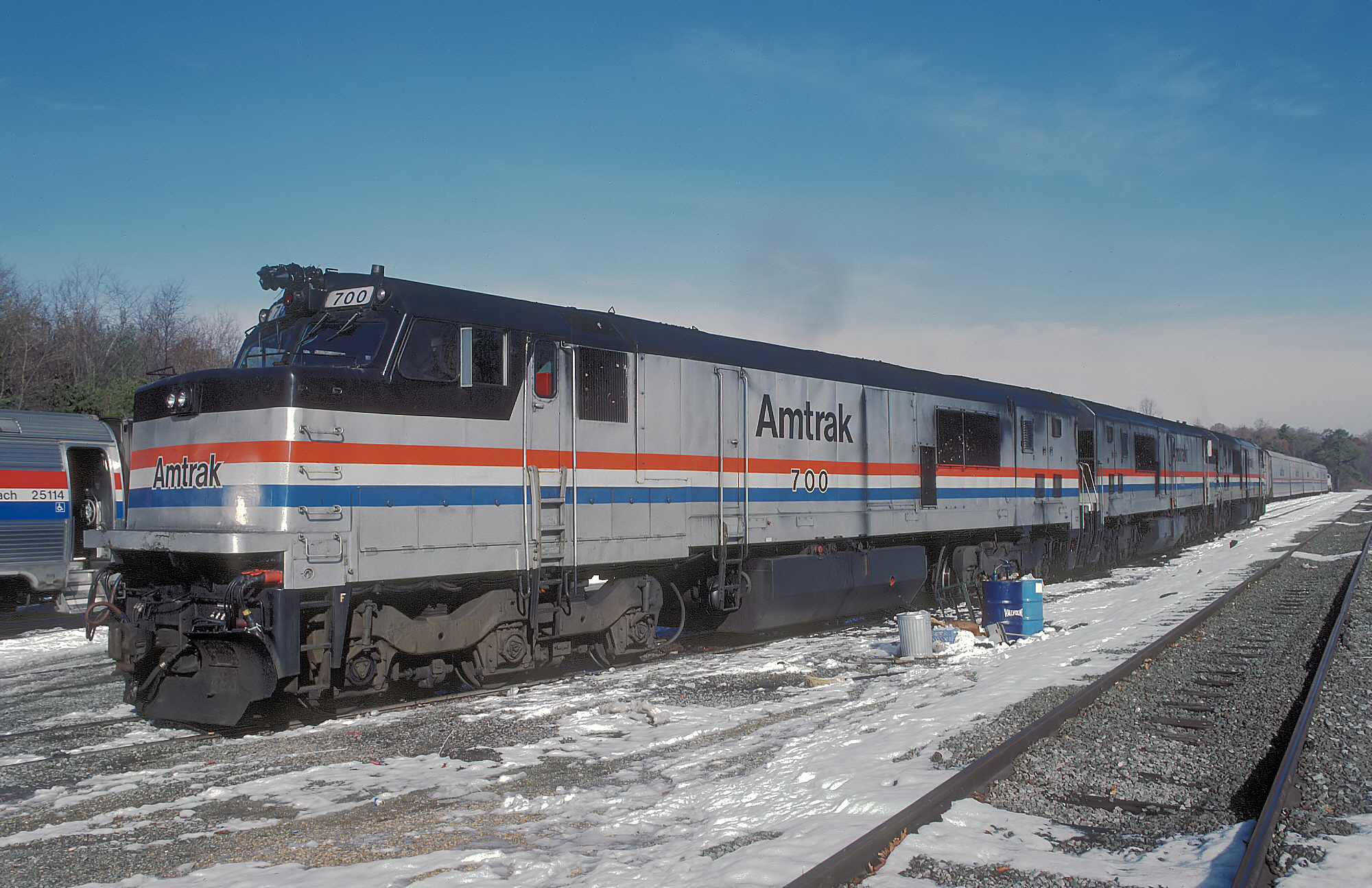
P30CH locomotive in 1987

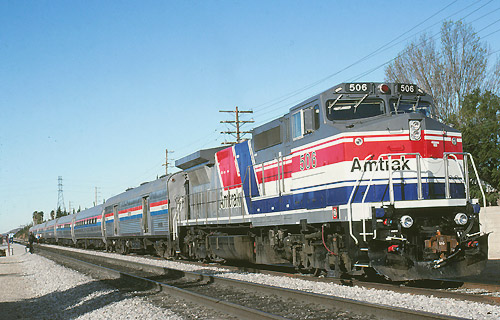
P32-8BWH locomotive in "Pepsi Can" livery in 1992

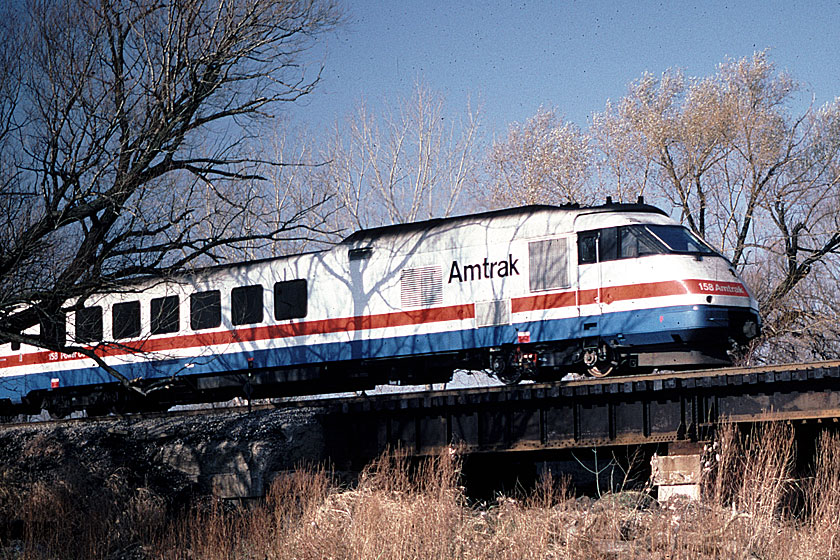
Class RTL Turboliner trainset in 1984

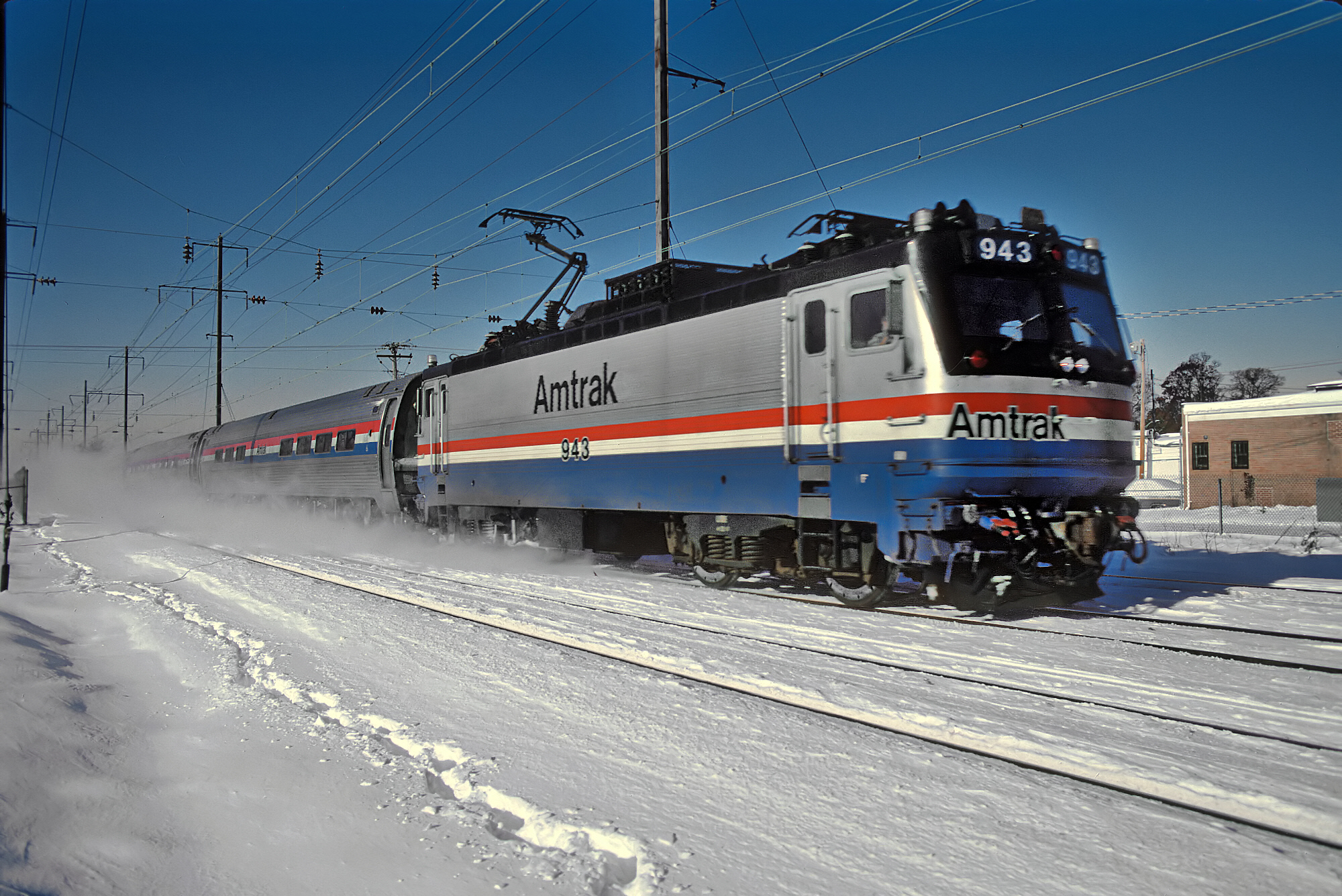
AEM-7 locomotive in 1987

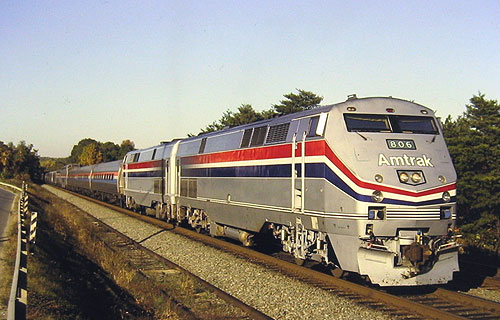
P40DC locomotive in 1993

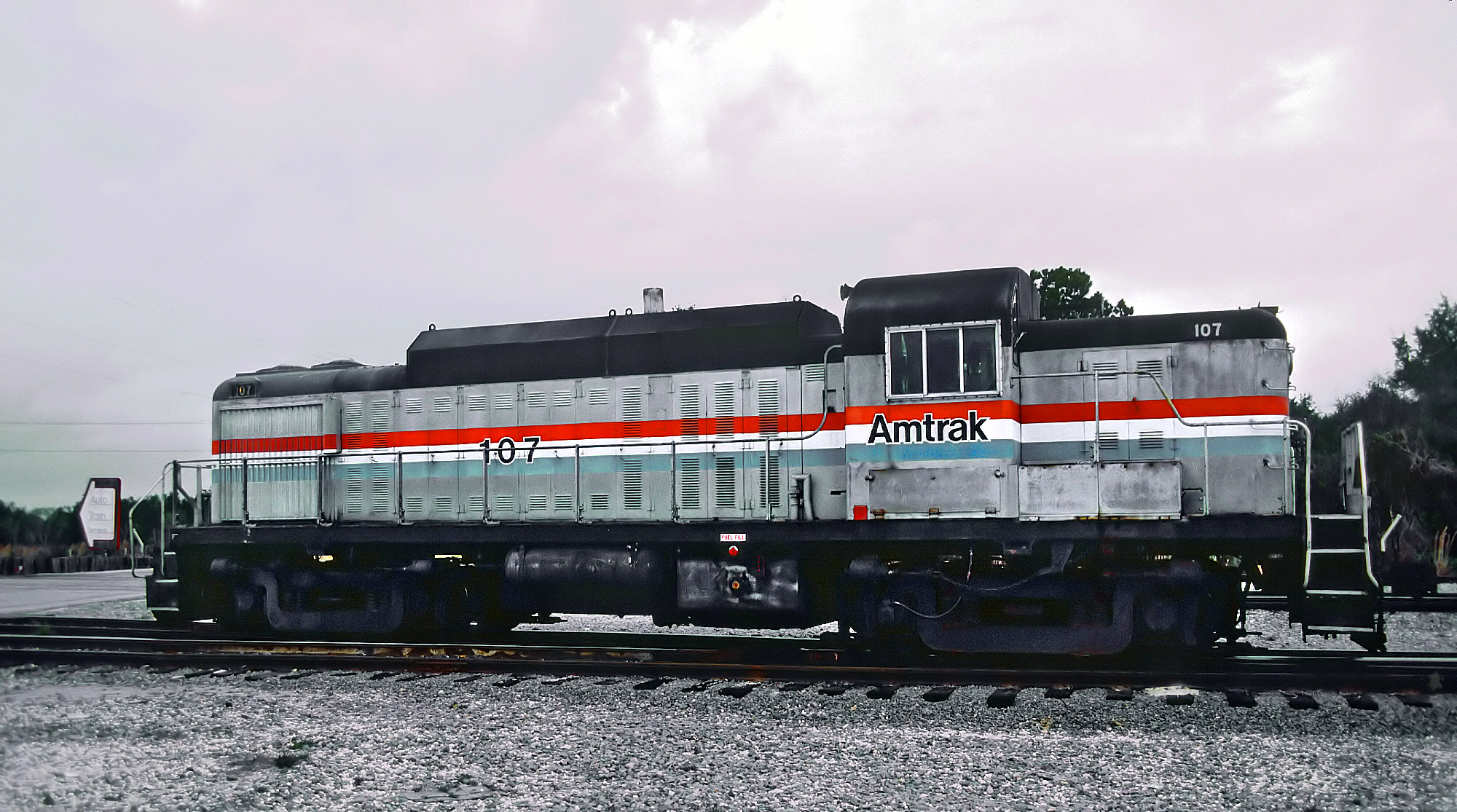
RS3M work locomotive in 1987

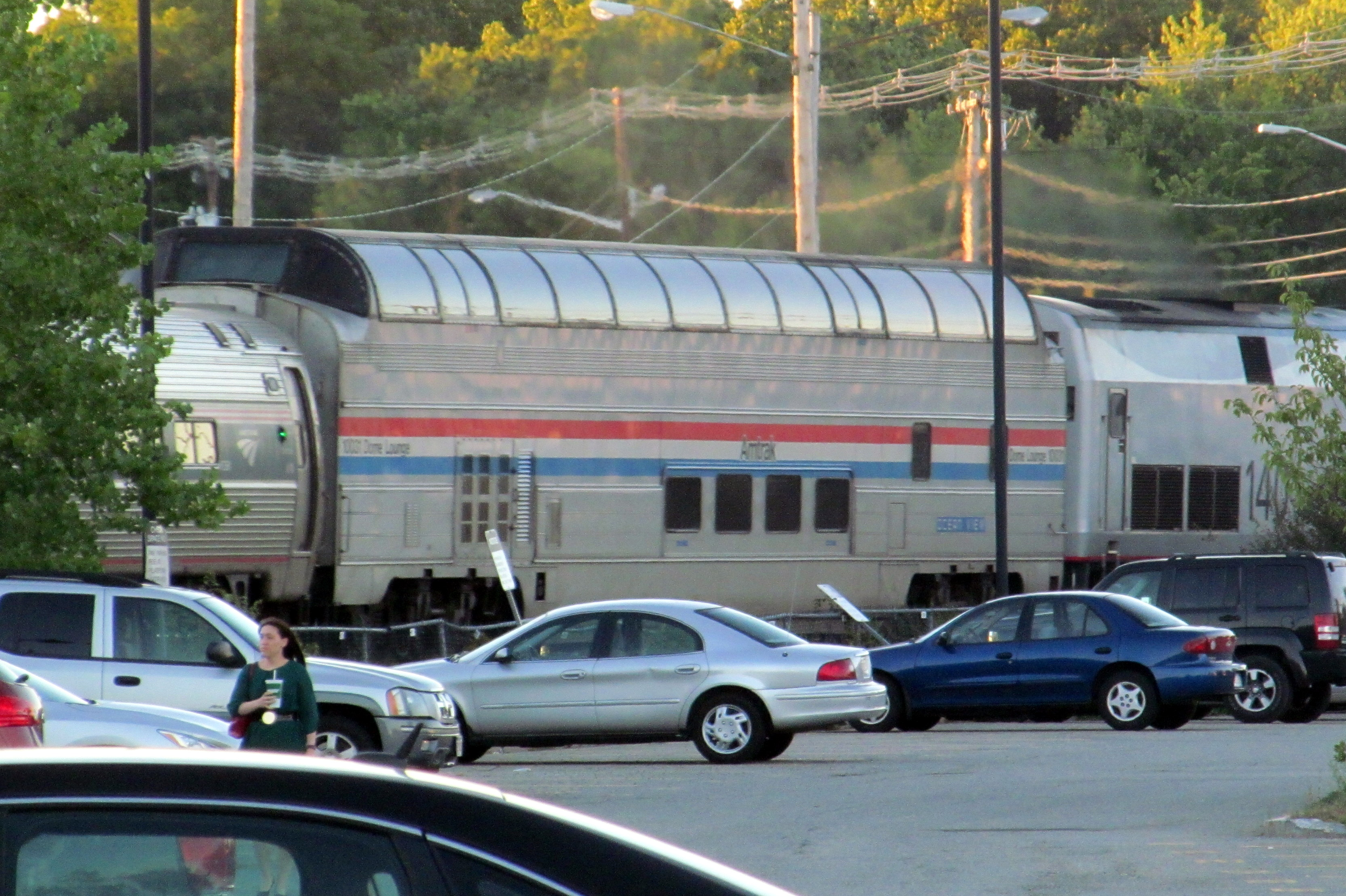
Heritage Fleet dome car "Ocean View" in 2016

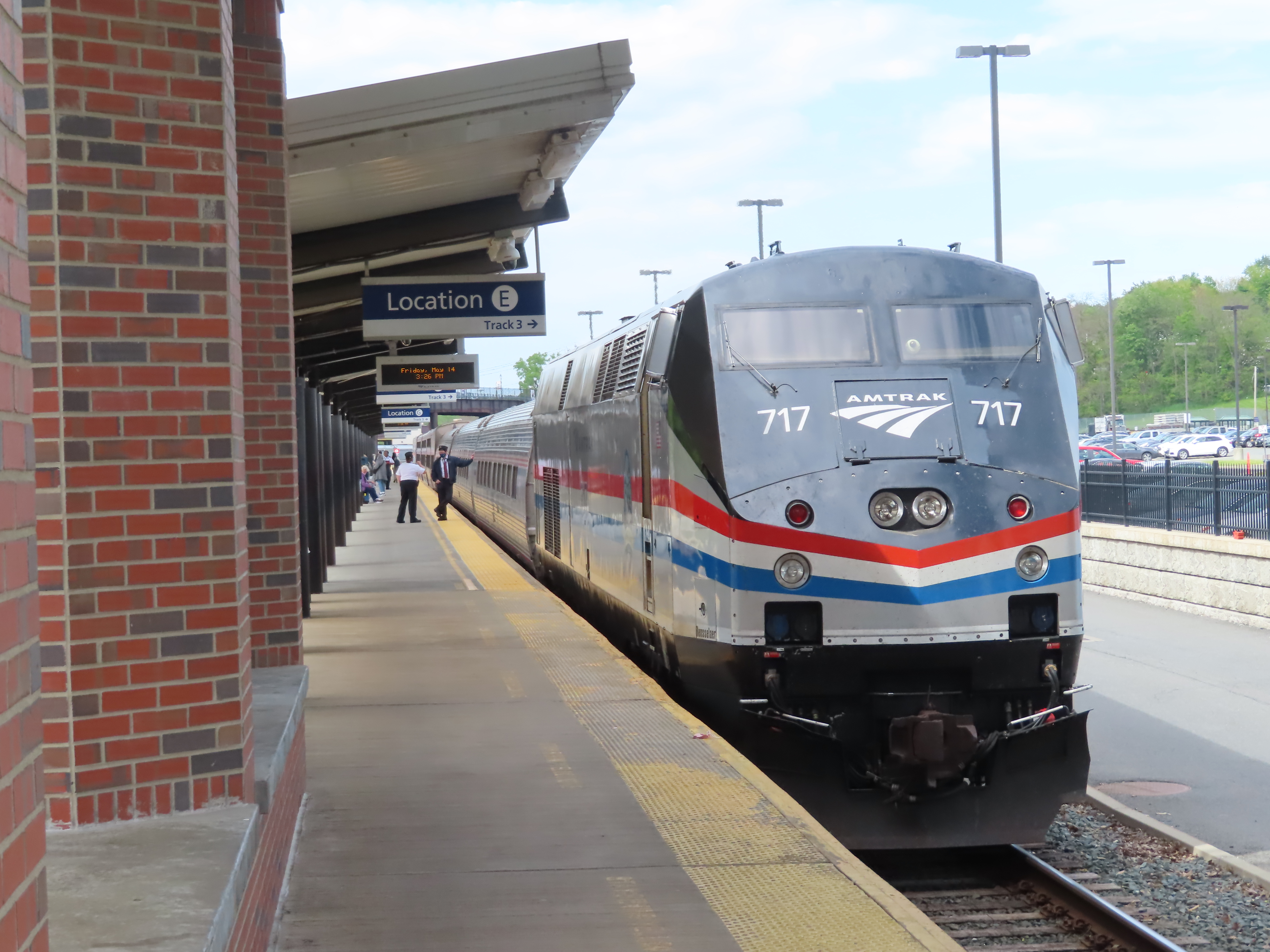
P32AC-DM locomotive in 2021

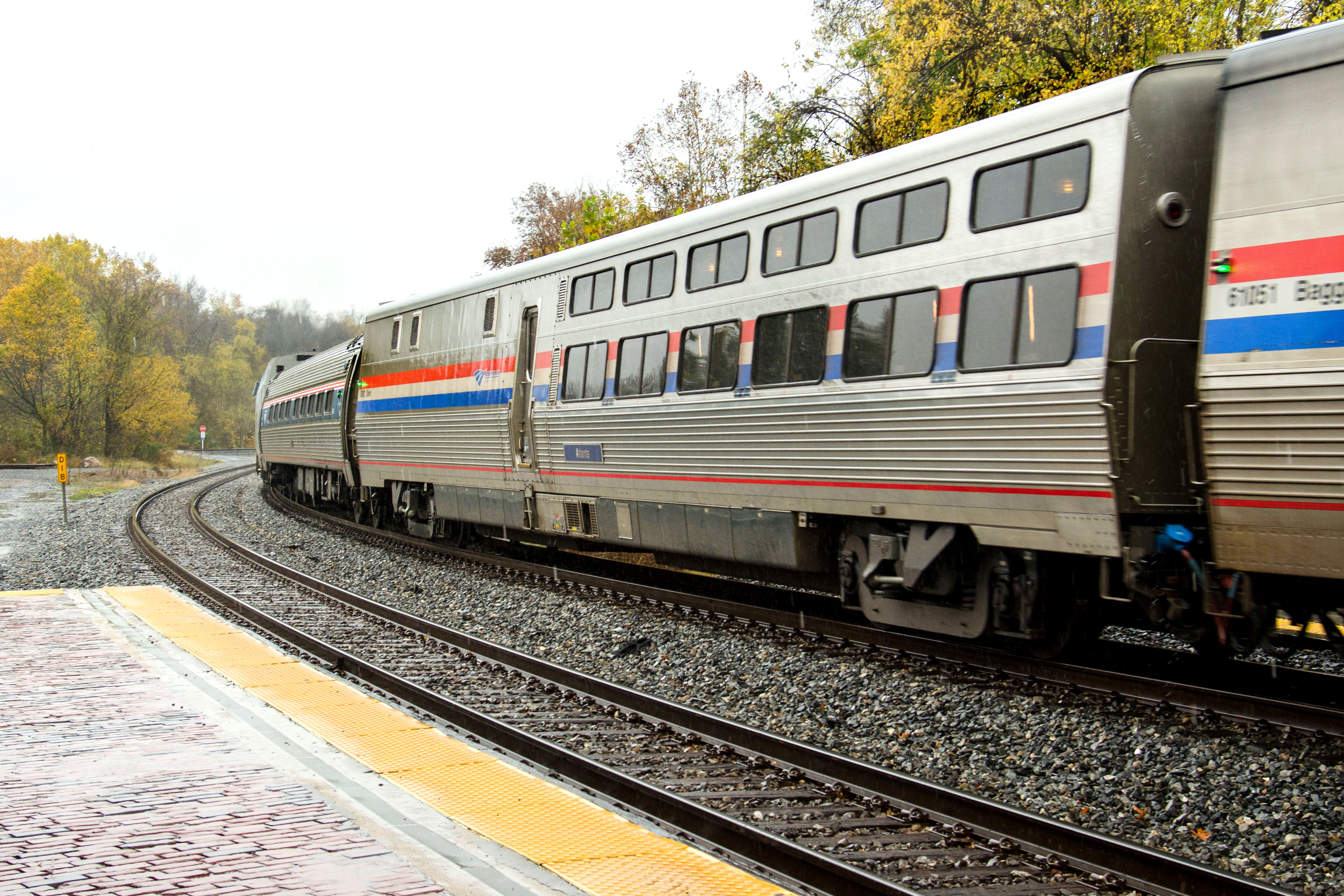
Viewliner II diner in 2017

=== Phase IV ===
Beginning in 1993, Phase IV was introduced as a striking departure from the traditional red, white, and blue style seen previously. Brought into service with the delivery of the newer Superliner II cars, Phase IV has two thin red stripes and a thick dark blue stripe. In 1997, Amtrak extended the scheme to locomotives, initially GE P42DC diesel locomotives on Northeast Corridor services. Locomotives for the Northeast Corridor services were light gray with a darker gray stripe at top; locomotives outside the Northeast Corridor did not have the top stripe.

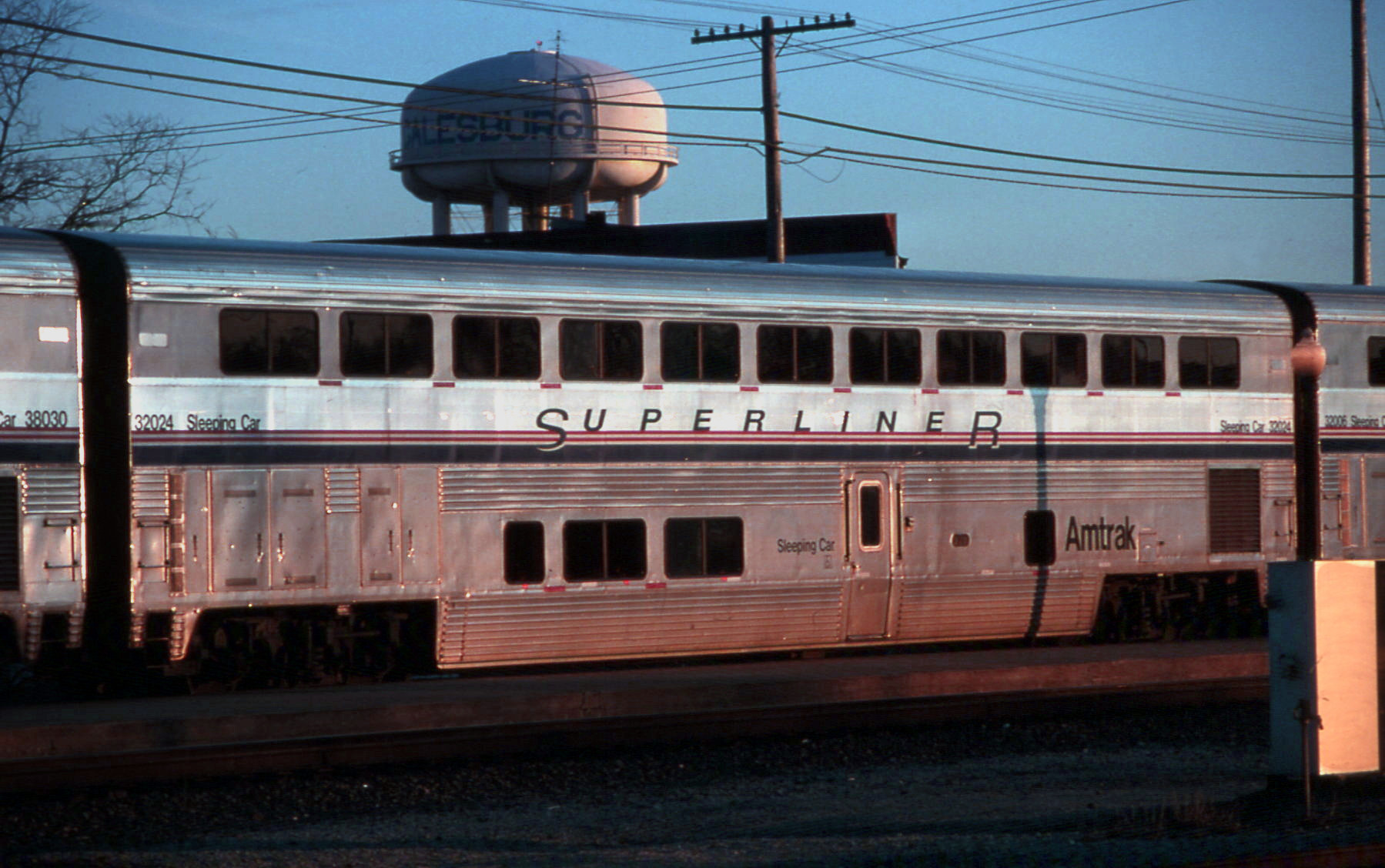
Superliner passenger cars in 1998

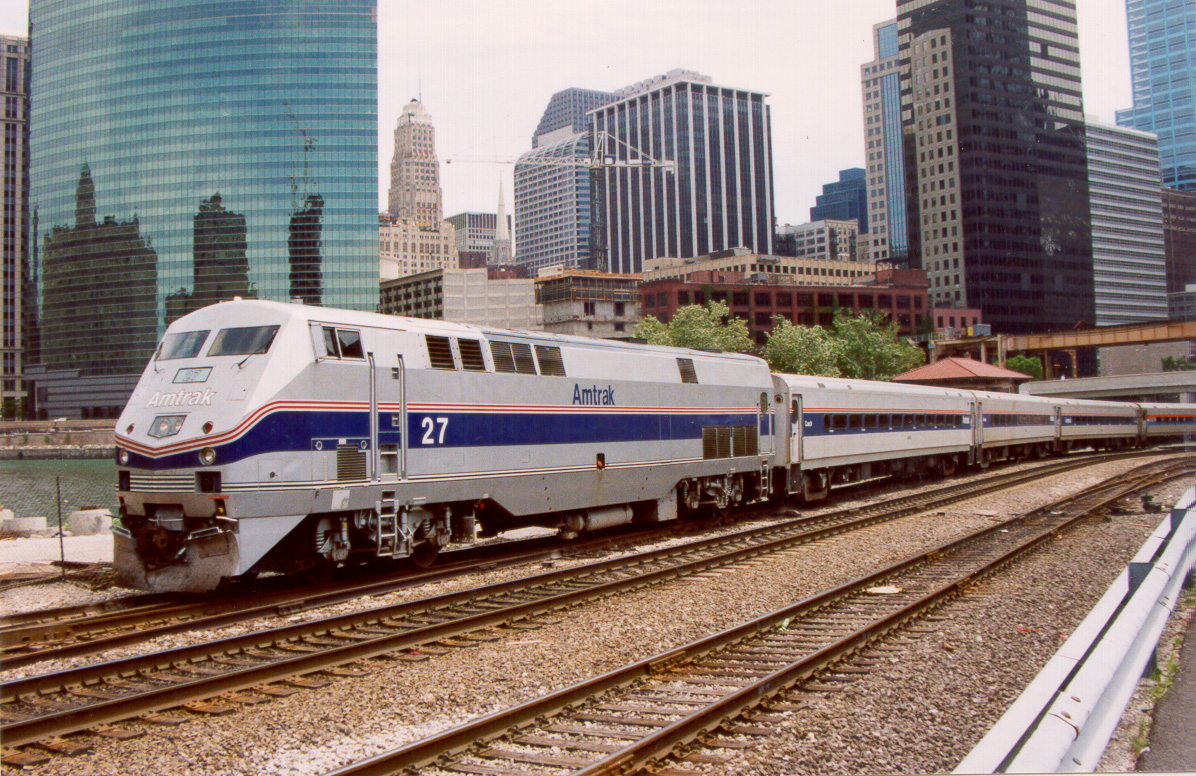
P42DC locomotive in 2001

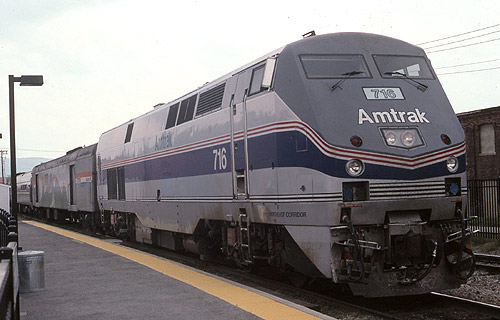
P32AC-DM locomotive with the Northeast Corridor scheme in 2001

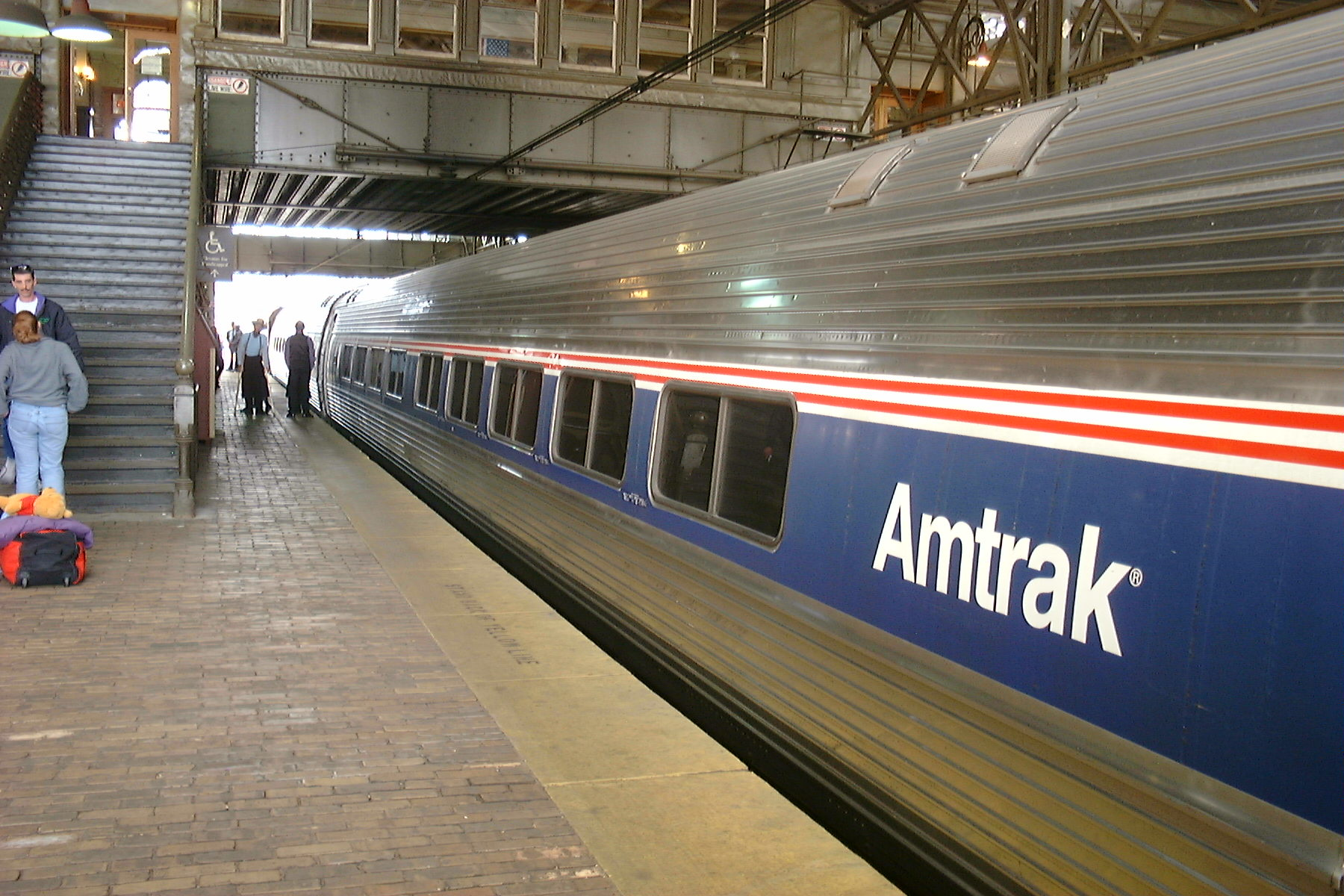
Amfleet I passenger cars in 2002

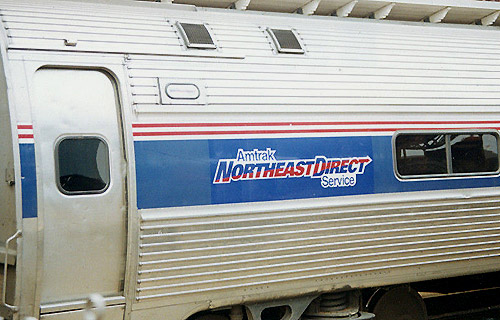
NortheastDirect branding in the 1990s

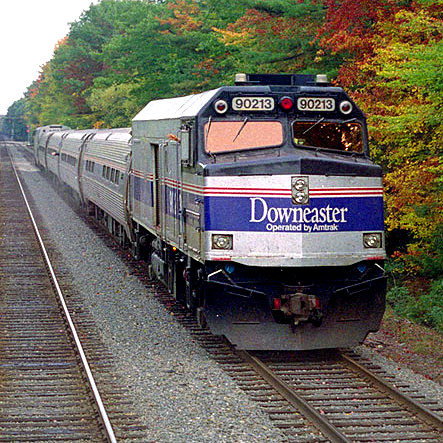
NPCU in 2005

=== Phase V ===
Phase V was introduced with the arrival of the Acela Express high-speed trainsets in 2000 and was used for most locomotives over the following quarter-century. Locomotives are painted light gray, with a blue stripe (darker than Phases I–III, but lighter than IV) at the top and a thin red reflective sill stripe at the bottom. The blue stripe has a wavy bottom on Genesis locomotives and Acela Express power cars, and a flat bottom on other locomotives and ex-F40PH non-powered control units (NPCUs). The Amtrak "Travelmark" logo is painted near the front or rear of the unit.

Acela Express trainsets have grey and stainless steel bodies with the lower red stripe, with the blue roof and Acela logo on the power cars only. The Acela passenger cars have no blue stripe; colored shapes called "mobiles", based on the shape of the Acela logo, are used to indicate the type of car (Business Class, Cafe Bistro, or First Class). A similar scheme was briefly used for Amfleet coaches on the Acela Regional, with a window stripe (light blue for Coach Class and baggage cars, blue for Business Class and cafe cars) and mobiles to indicate the type of service. The rebuilt Turboliners also had a version of the Phase V livery, with similar window stripes and mobiles.

Non-passenger cars such as Auto Train auto racks are all-gray except for the logo and red stripe; Express Box Cars had blue stripes on top and bottom.

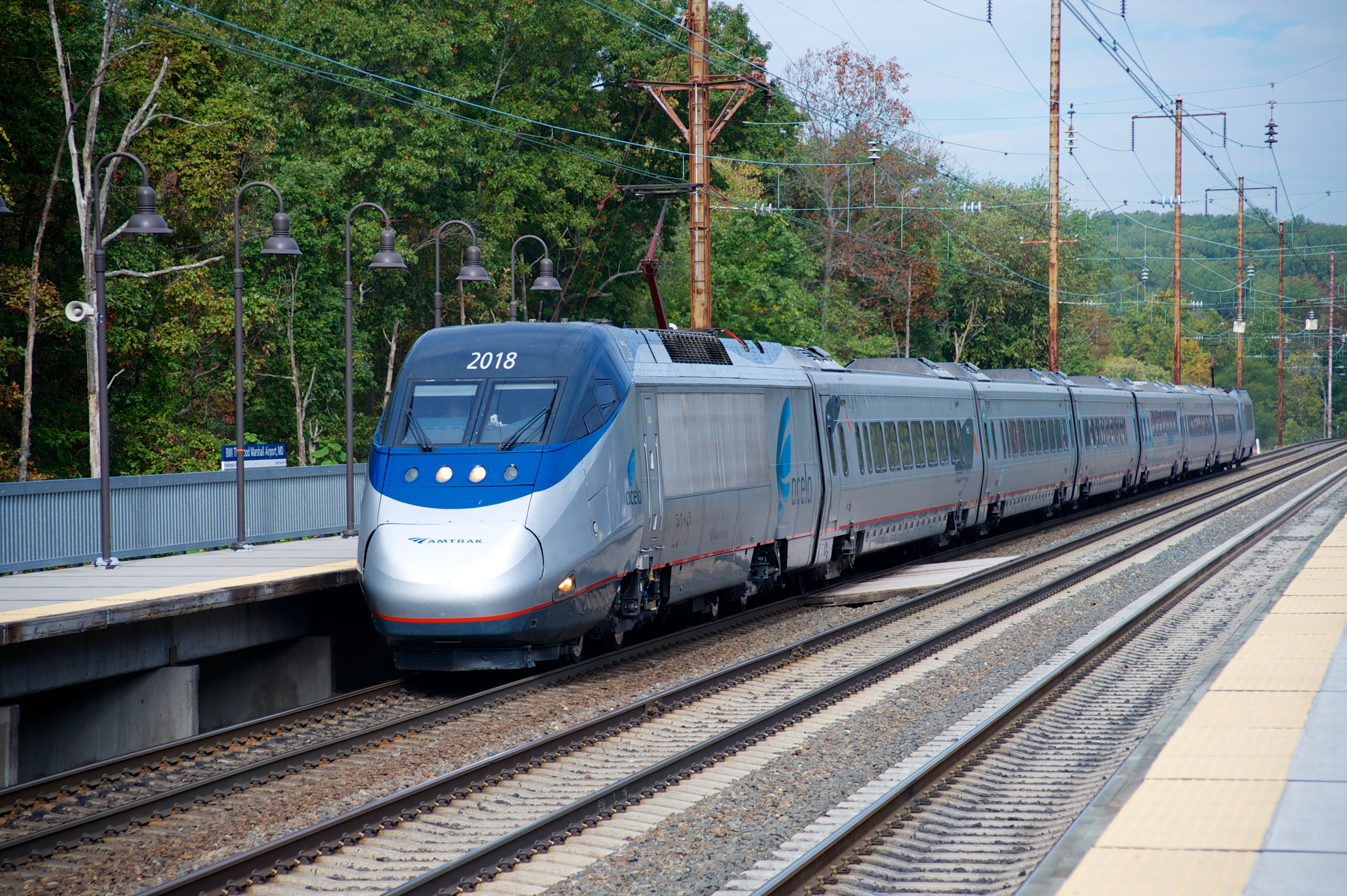
Acela Express trainset in 2013

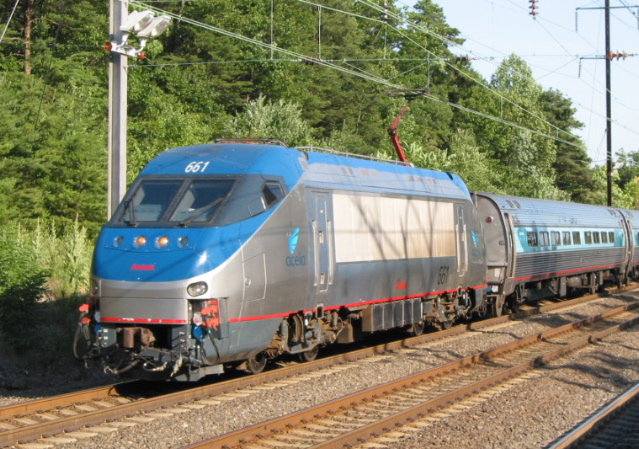
HHP-8 locomotive (with Acela logo) and Amfleet I passenger cars in Phase V livery in 2002

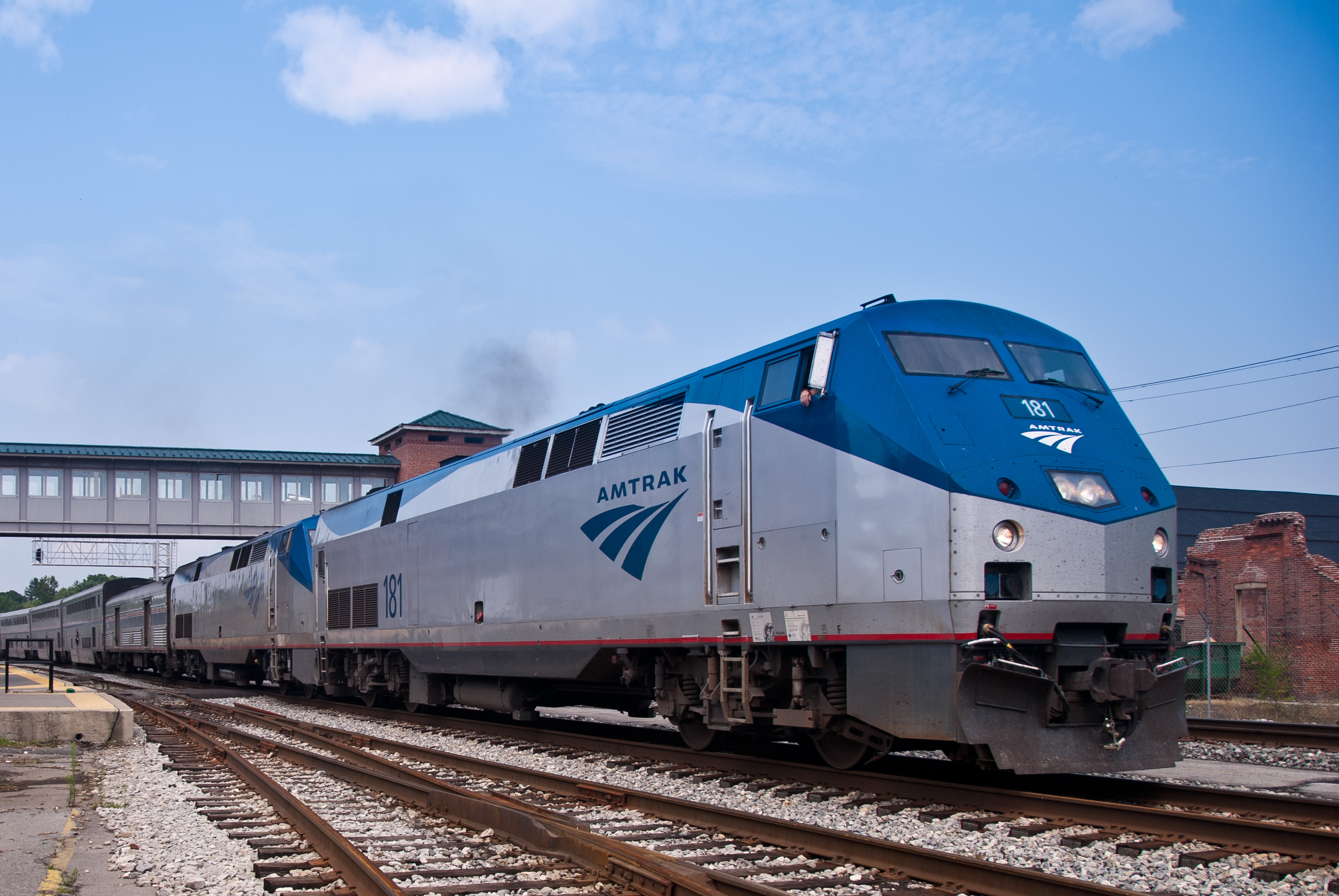
P42DC locomotive in 2007

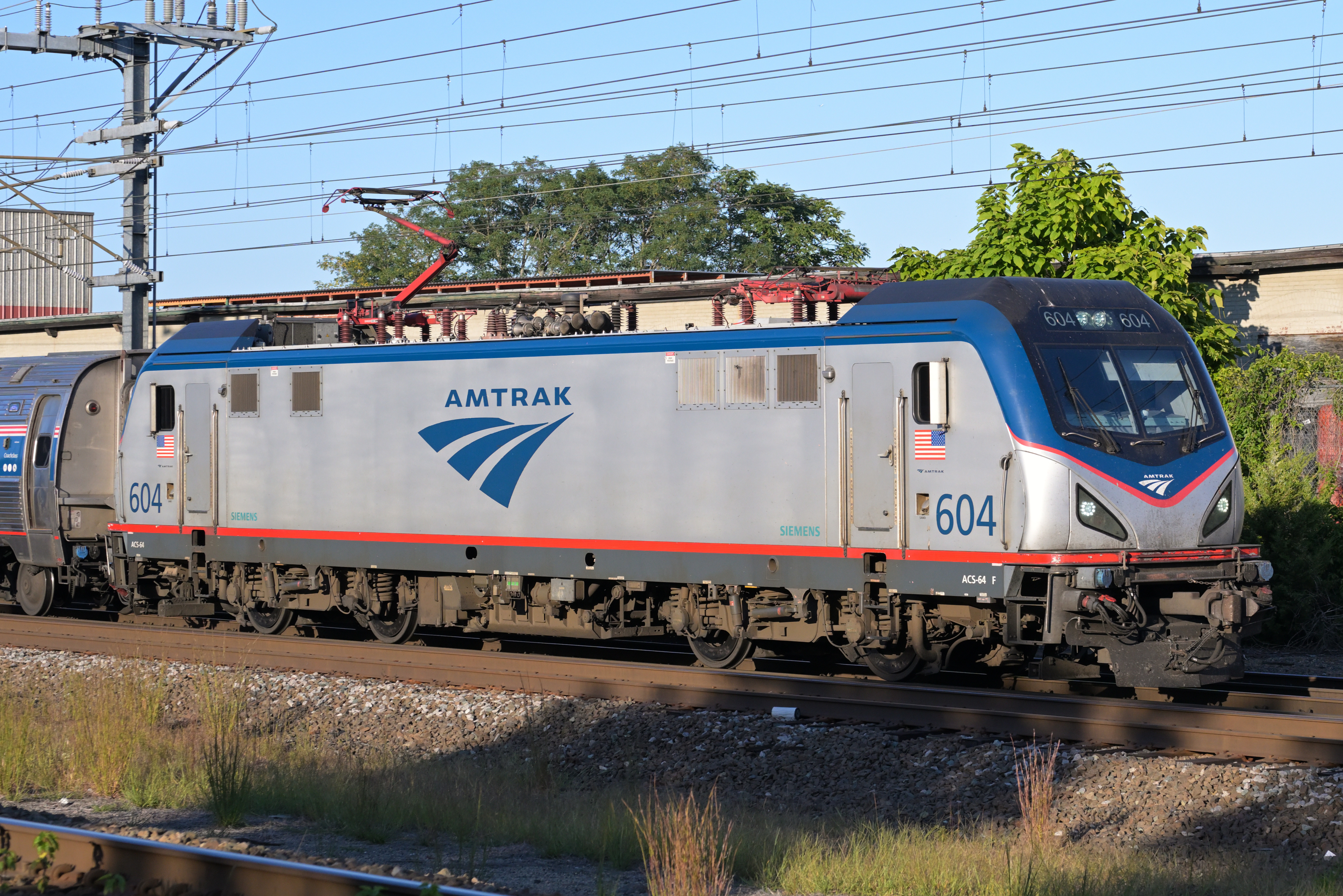
ACS-64 locomotive in 2025

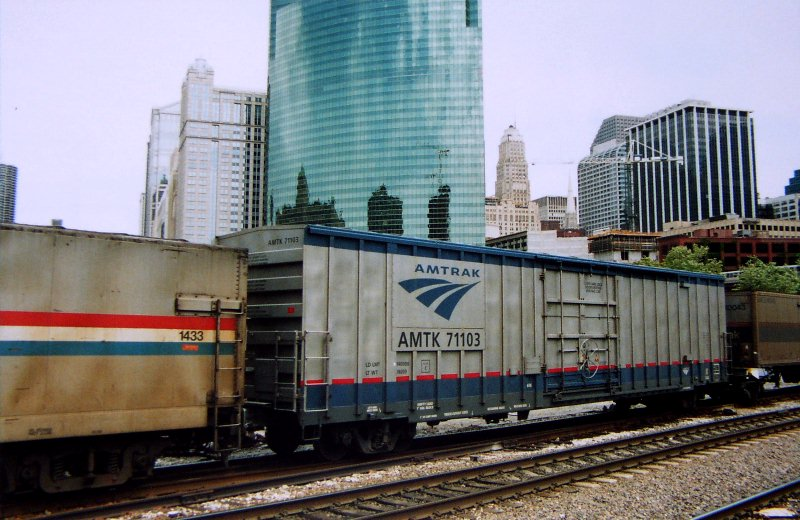
Express Box Car in 2001

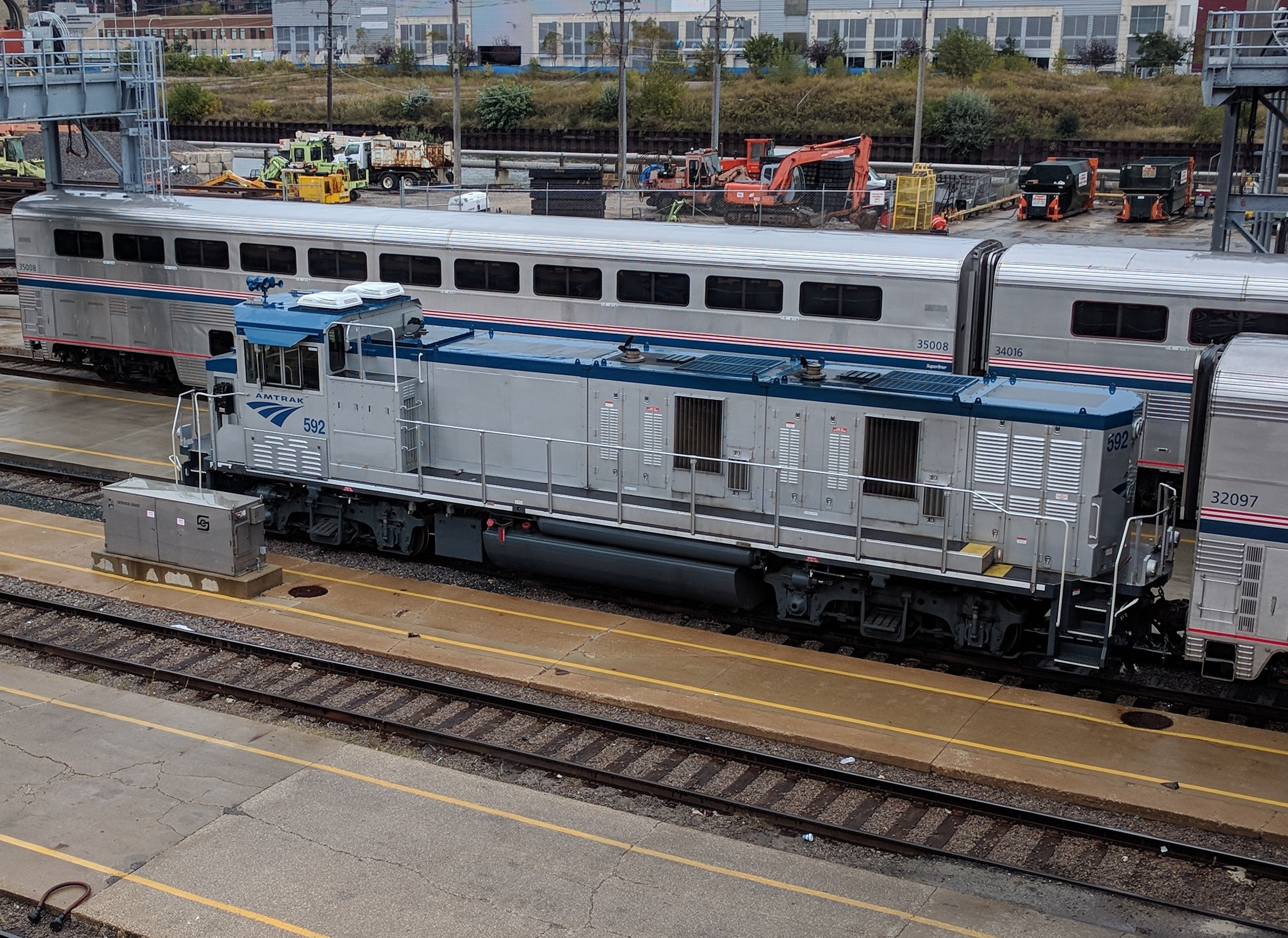
MP14B switcher in 2018

=== Phase VI (Phase IVb) ===
Phase VI (also called Phase IVb) was introduced in 2002, and is currently used on most passenger cars. It retains the same stripe style as Phase IV: wide window stripes on single-level cars, and narrow stripes on Superliners. The red reflective sill stripe and mid-tone blue on Phase V are used. Single-level cars have white logos within the blue stripe, while Superliners have blue logos below the stripes. Five of the first six Siemens Charger ALC-42 locomotives have a Phase VI scheme consisting of a mostly blue body with red and black around the windshield, with red and silver chevrons at the rear. Amtrak described this as a "transitional paint scheme". A single P42DC was painted into Phase VI as well in 2021 as part of Amtrak's 50th anniversary, without the red chevrons on the rear.

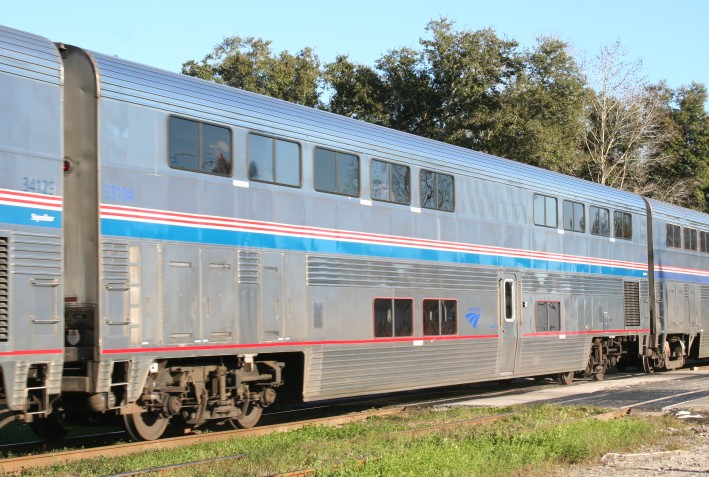
Superliner I dining car in 2006

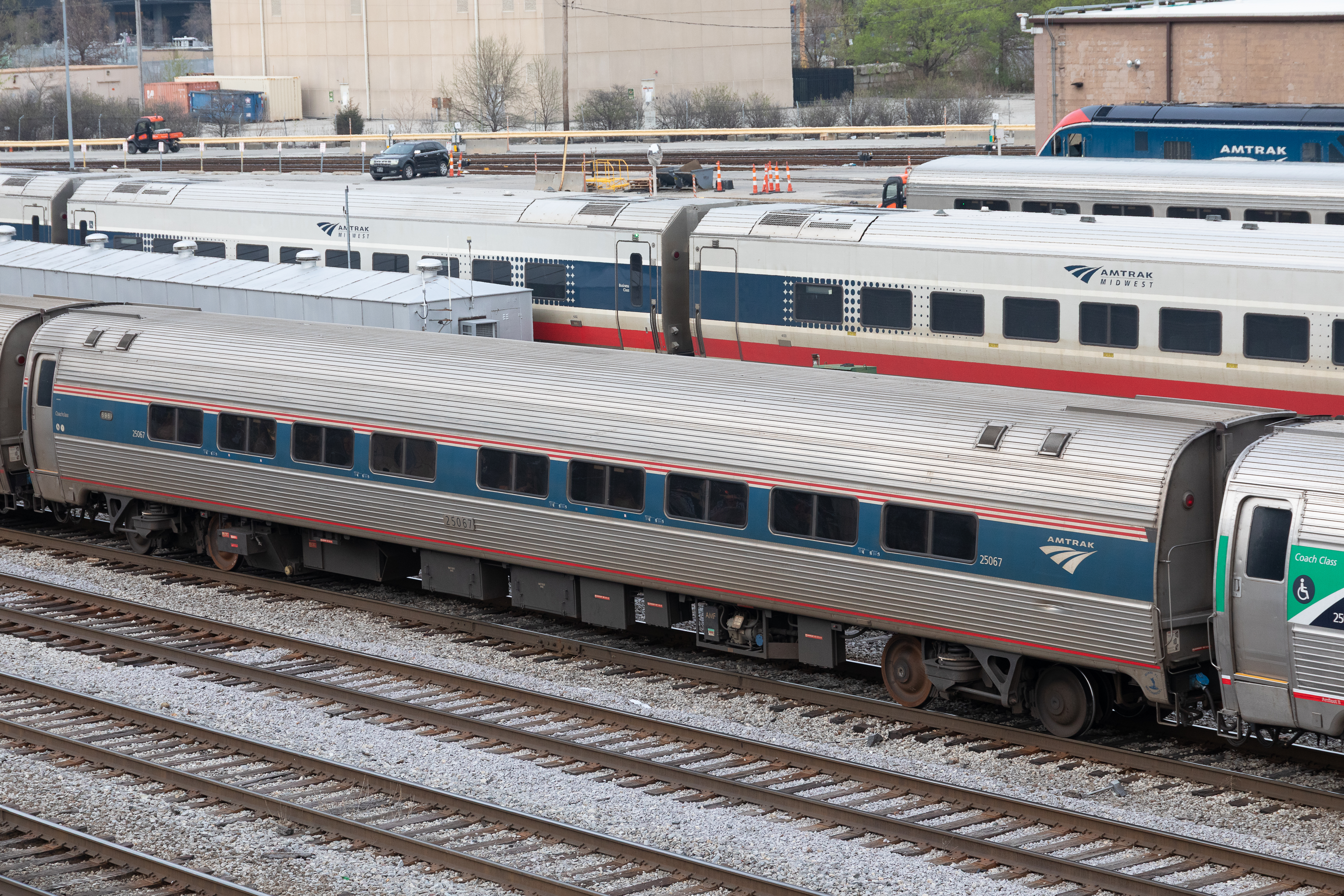
Amfleet II coach in 2025

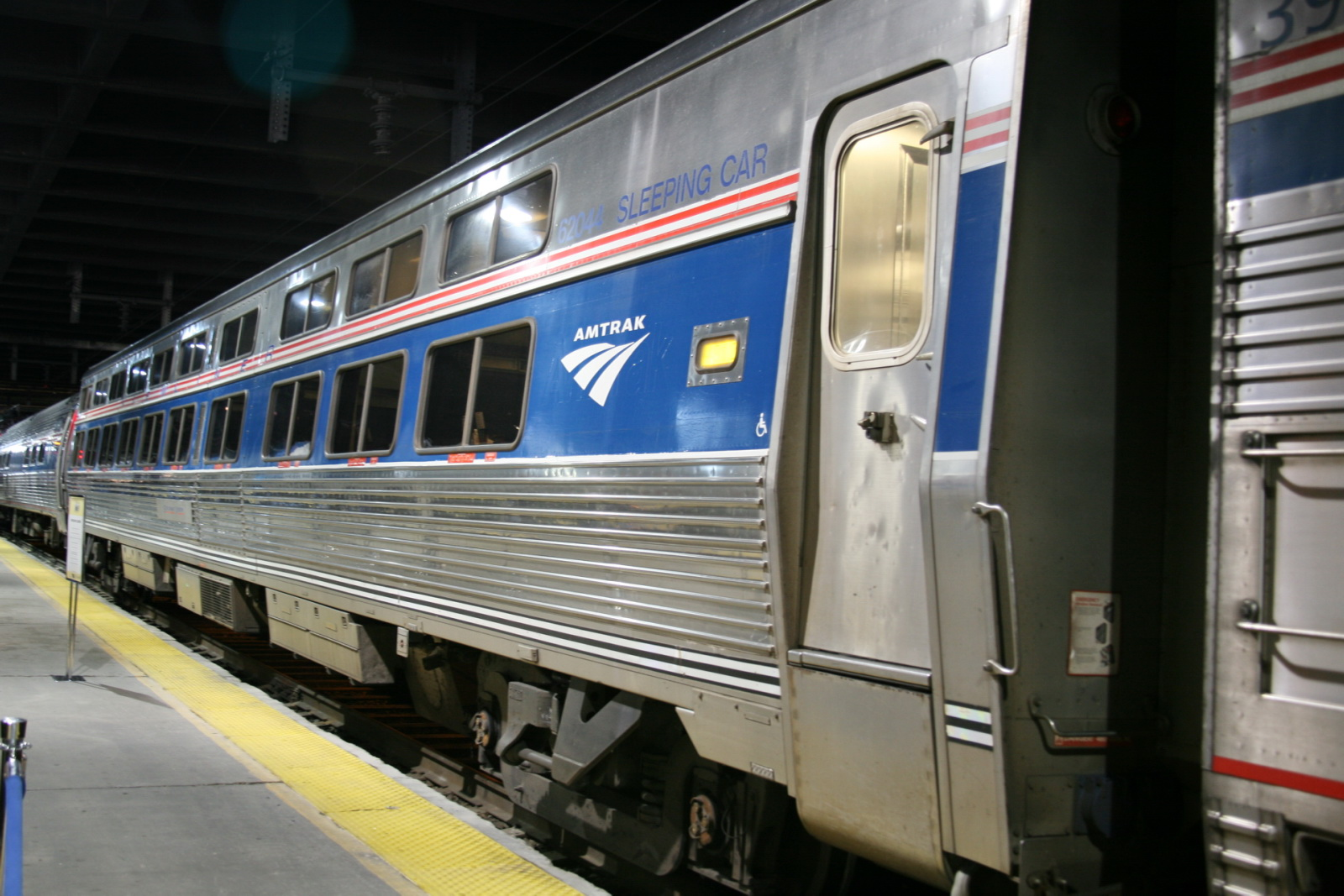
Viewliner I sleeping car in 2008

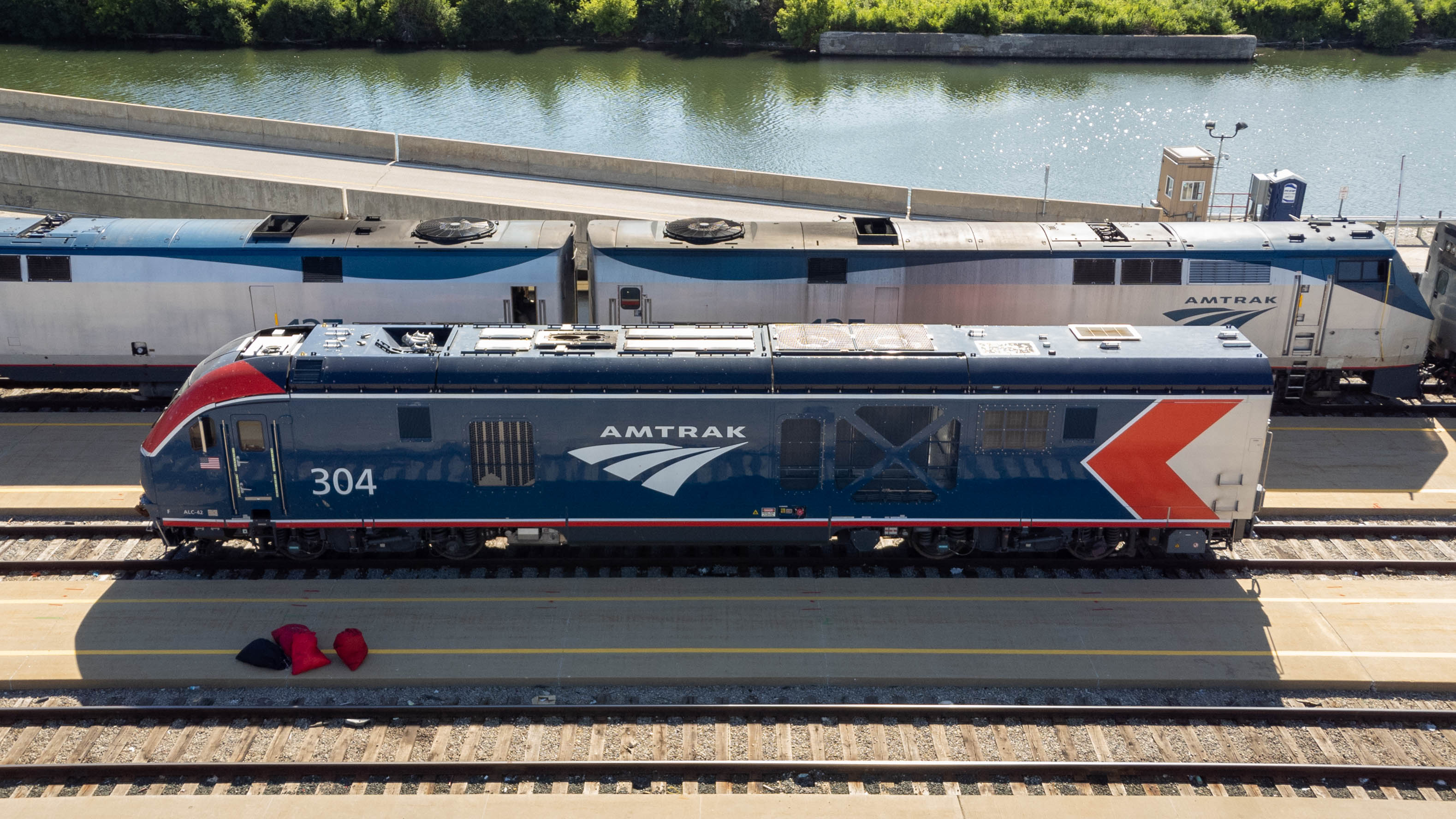
Siemens ALC-42 locomotive in 2022

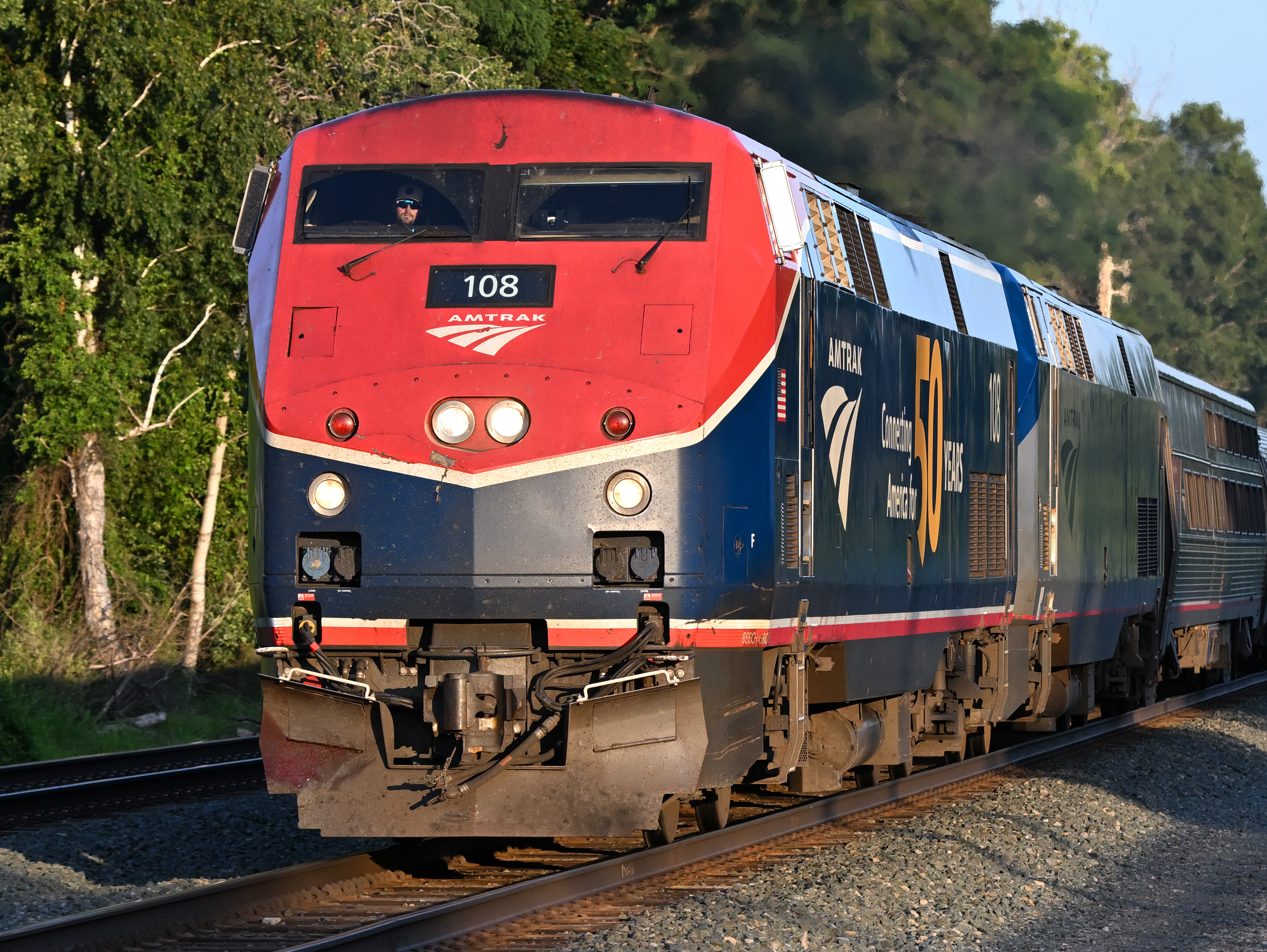
P42DC locomotive in 2026

=== Phase VII ===
Phase VII is the latest livery for most Amtrak equipment. It debuted on Siemens Charger ALC-42 locomotives in 2022. The design features two tones of blue on the sides, divided by a curved white stripe. The black cab window area is flanked by red and white stripes, with matching red and white sill stripes running the length of the locomotive. In January 2024, Amtrak began repainting Genesis locomotives in the Phase VII livery, prompted by the depletion of Phase V paint supplies at the Beech Grove Shops. Passenger cars began to receive the new Phase VII design in December 2024. Passenger cars utilize different accent colors to indicate service levels: red for first class, light blue for business class, and green for coach class. The name of the car fleet type is printed on the sill stripe. Alongside the rollout of Phase VII, Amtrak reintroduced the practice of naming sleeping cars, with Viewliners being named after rivers east of the Mississippi River while Superliners are named after states and national parks. The future Amtrak Airo trainsets for East Coast routes will also have Phase VII livery. Locomotives will have the same paint scheme as the ALC-42; the passenger cars will be light blue in the middle with curved white stripes and blue at the ends.

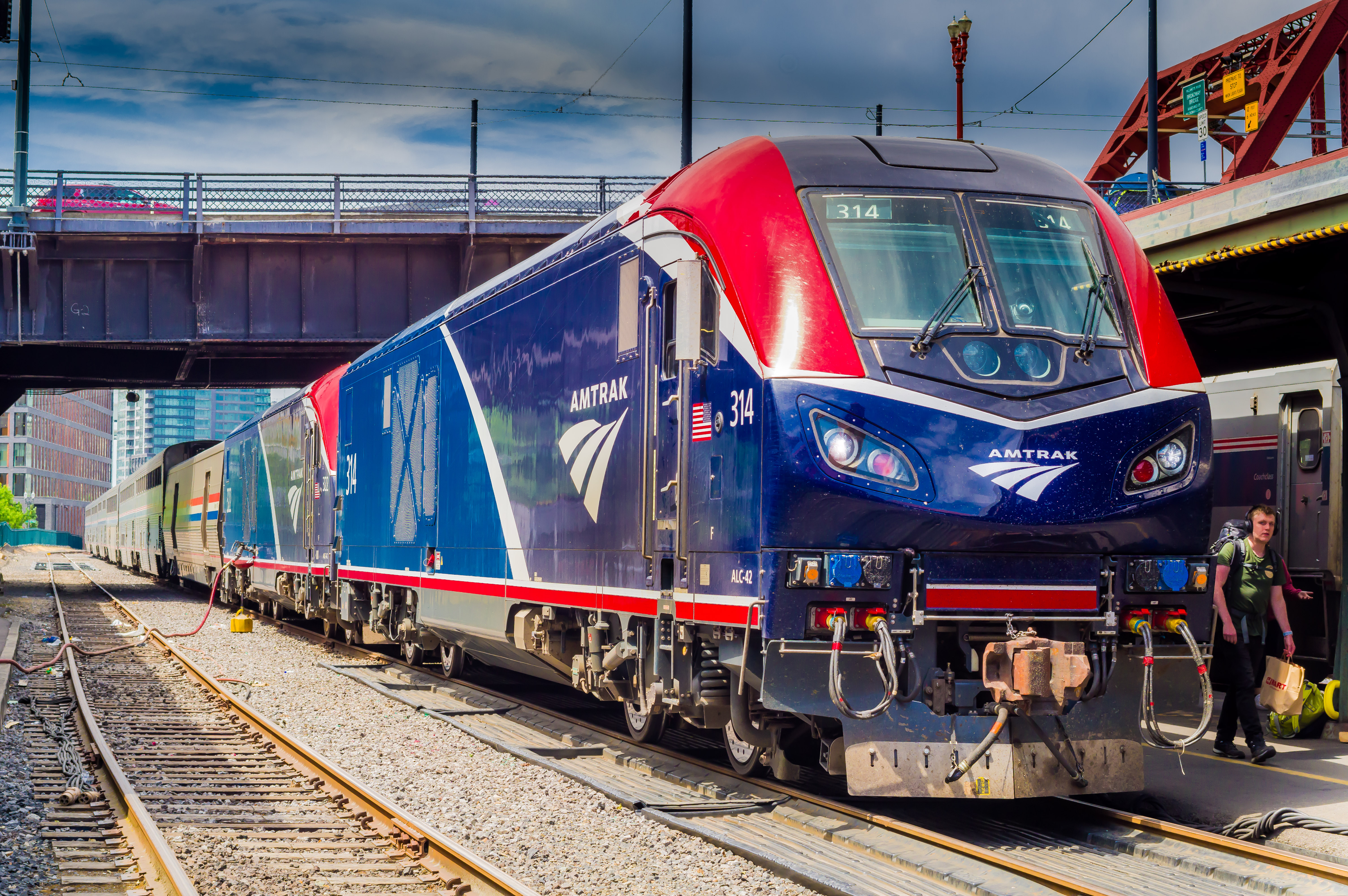
ALC-42 locomotives in 2023

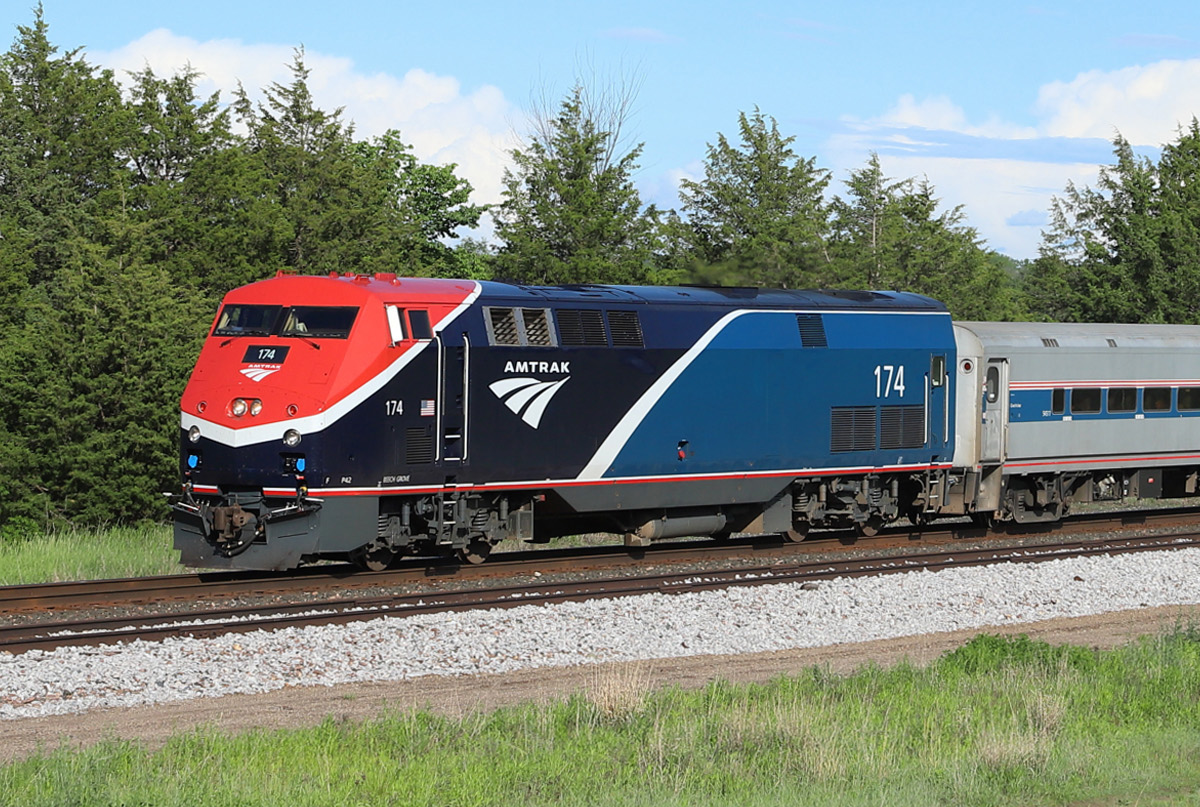
P42DC locomotive in 2024

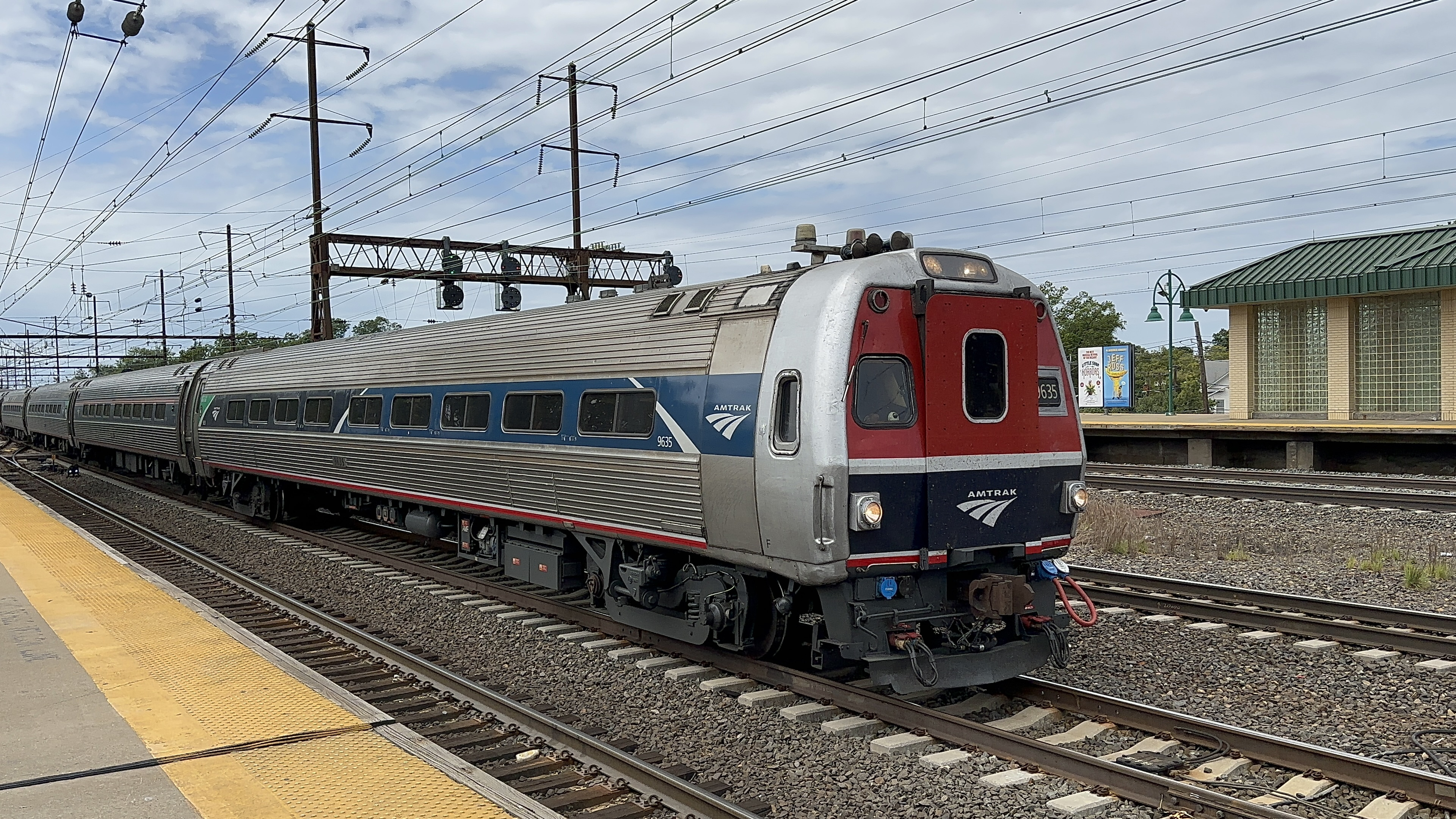
Metroliner cab car in 2025

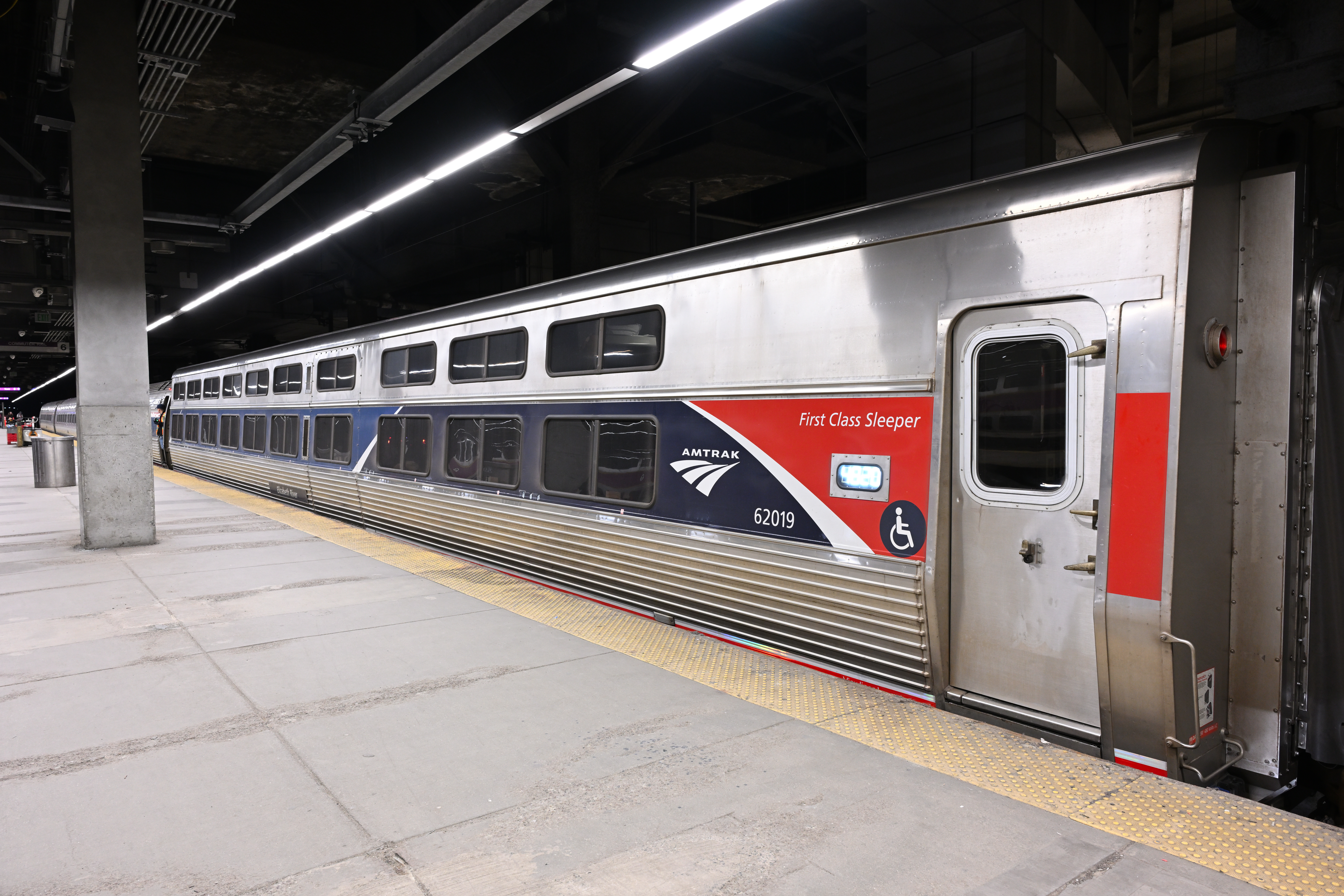
Viewliner I sleeper in 2025

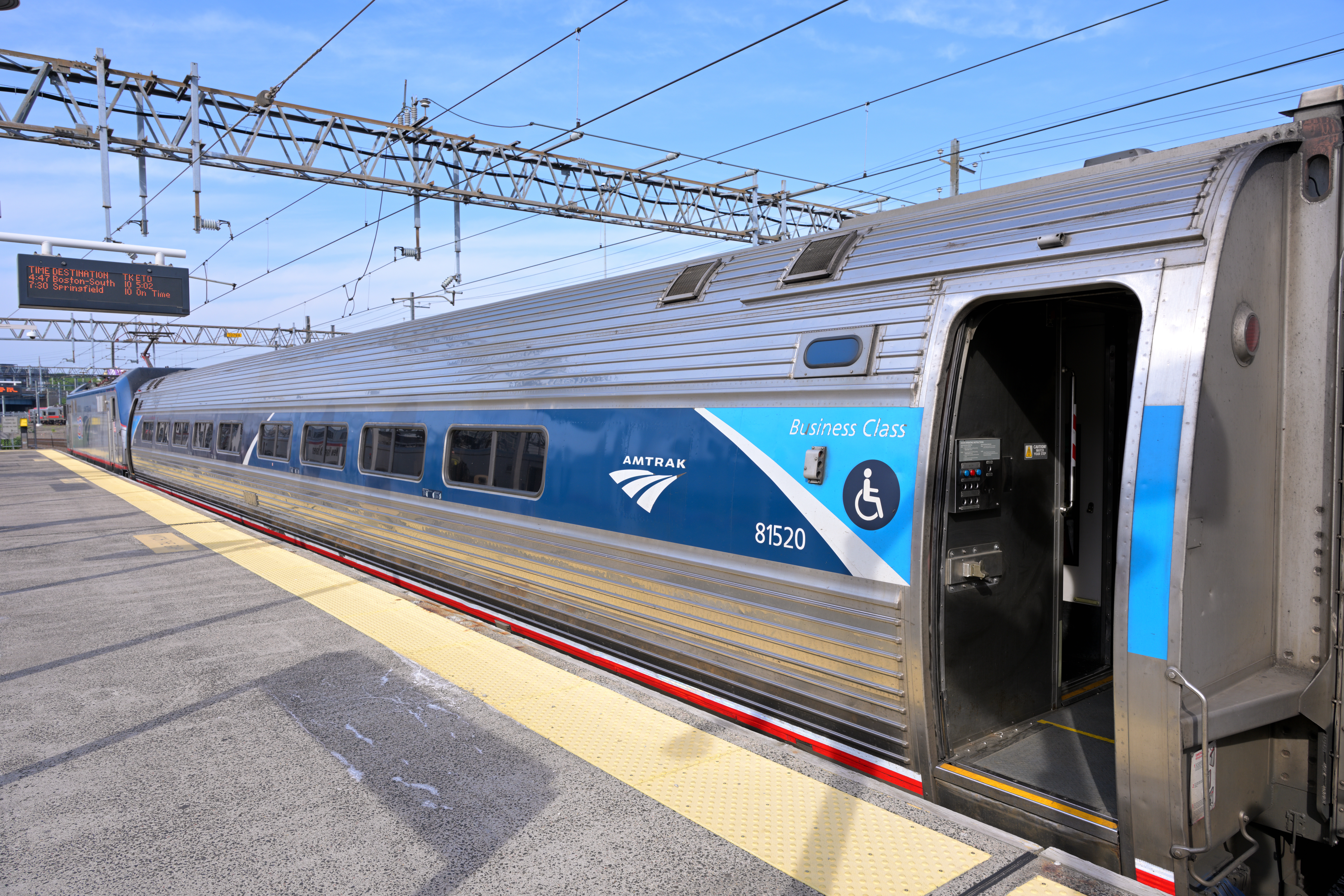
Amfleet I business-class car in 2026

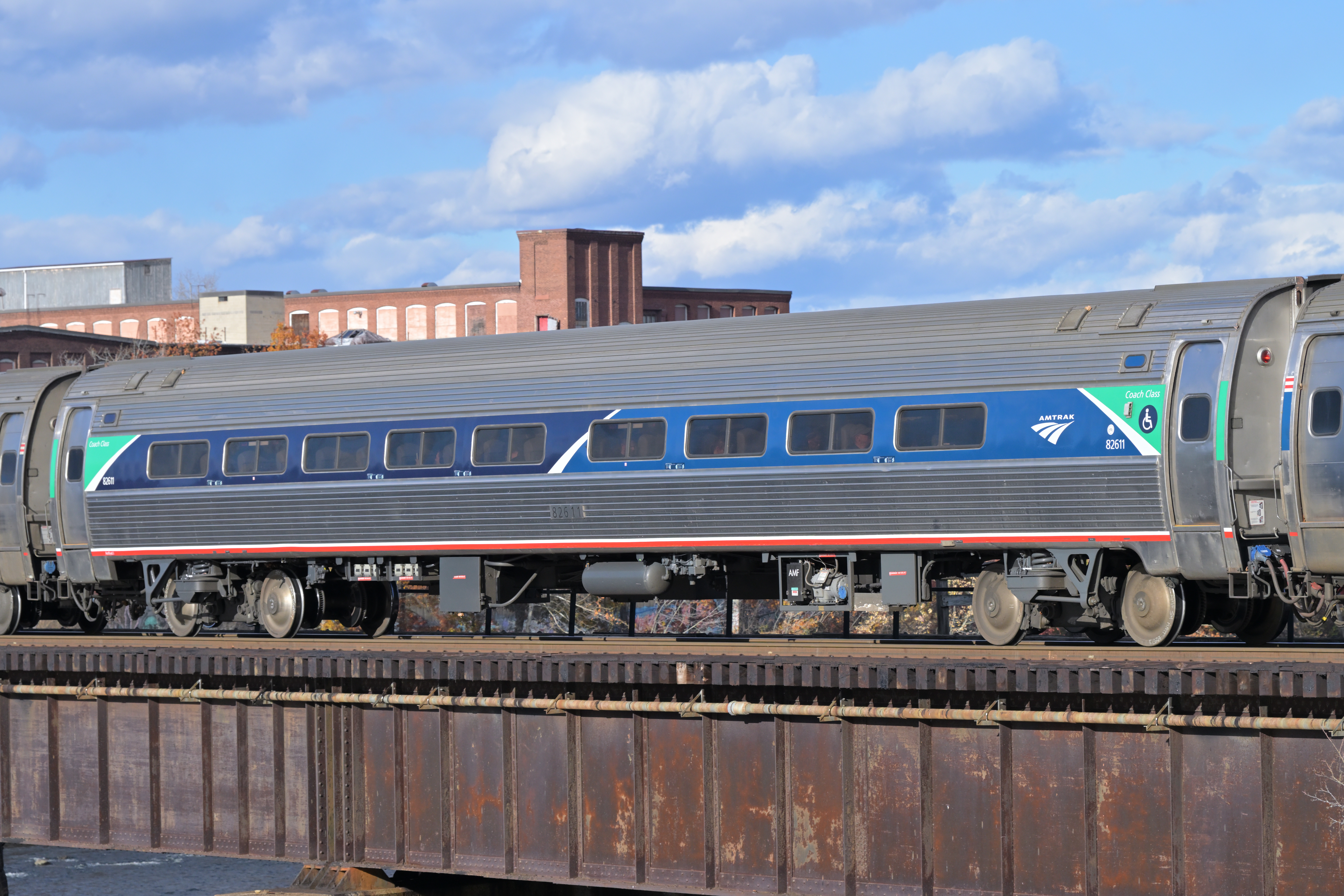
Amfleet I coach in 2025

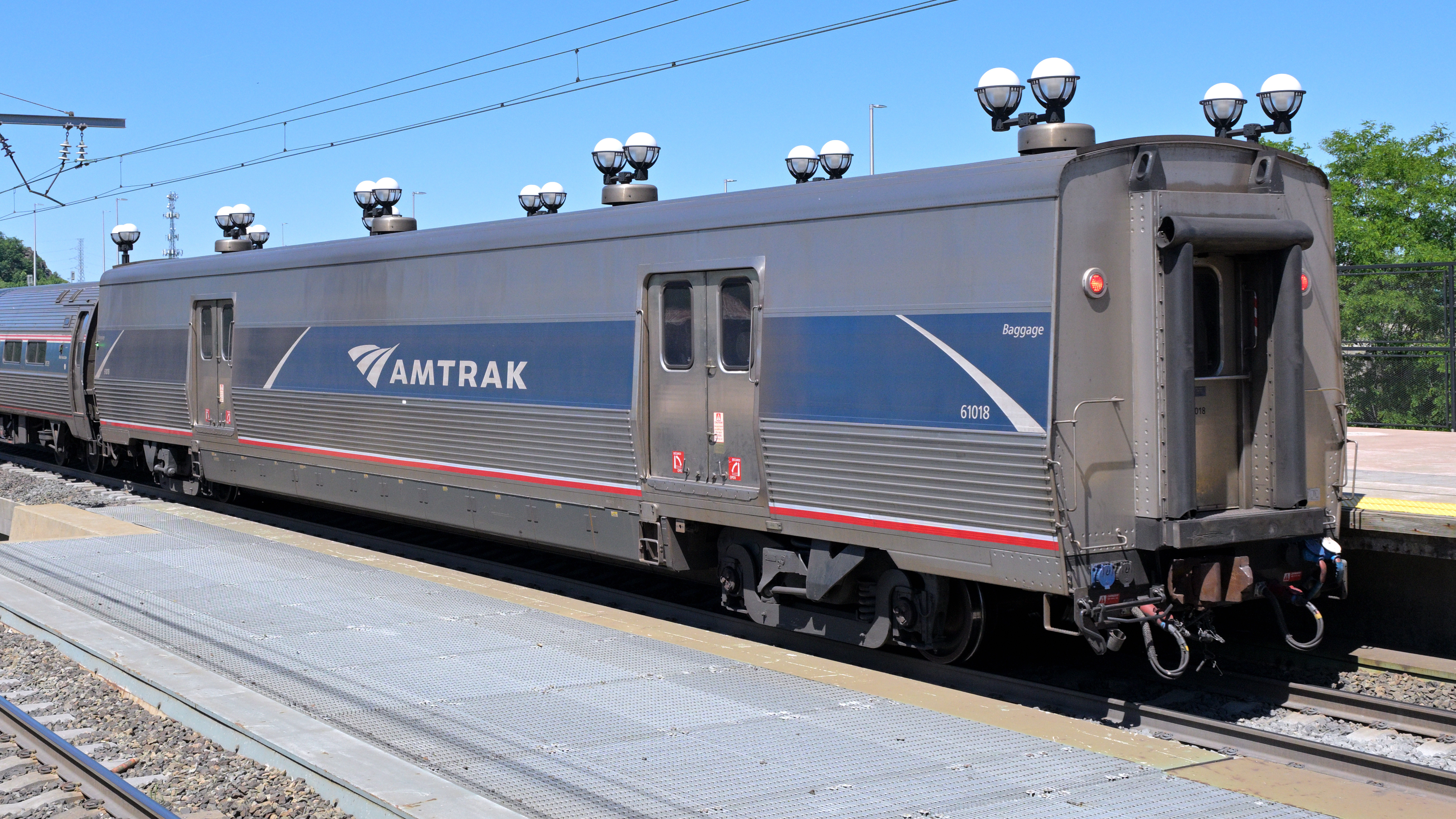
Viewliner baggage car in 2026

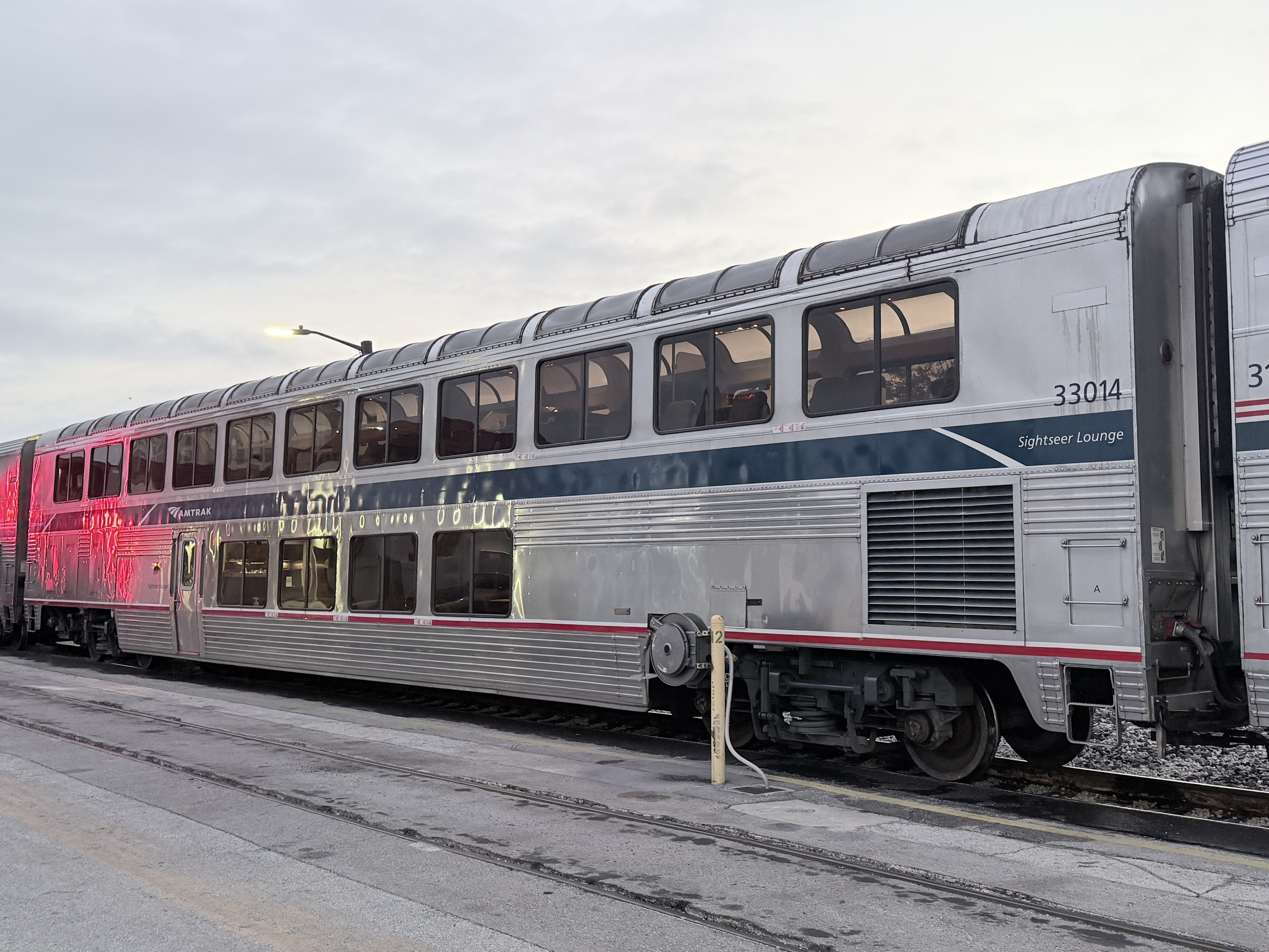
Superliner Sightseer Lounge in 2026

== Route-specific paint schemes ==
Thirteen Amtrak-operated, state-funded corridor routes — eight Midwest routes, three Amtrak California routes, and the Cascades and Piedmont — are operated by Amtrak using equipment that is largely owned by the states in which they operate, and painted in custom schemes that deviate from the national Amtrak livery. Several other route-specific paint schemes have been used in the past.

=== Amtrak California ===
The three routes under the Amtrak California brand — the Capitol Corridor, Pacific Surfliner, and Gold Runner — use equipment painted in several custom schemes. The Capitol Corridor and Gold Runner largely use California Cars, F59PHI locomotives, and Charger SC-44 locomotives painted with the state colors of blue and yellow. F59PHI locomotives are gray with a navy blue underside, yellow bottom stripe, black roof, and navy blue cab area; Caltrans and Amtrak California logos are prominent. The California Cars are stainless steel with a black upper window stripe, a navy blue lower window stripe with a yellow pinstripe, and orange triangles next to boarding doors. Charger SC-44 locomotives are gray with navy blue curved shapes on the front and rear with yellow accents, a black cab area, and Amtrak California logos on the front and sides. Single-level Comet IB and Horizon cars used on the Gold Runner have a yellow bottom stripe and a navy blue window stripe with orange, turquoise, and light blue accents. Several NPCUs used for the service are gray with turquoise and light blue stripes and a curve towards the top rear of the locomotive, red chevron stripes on the front (a nod to a 1985 Caltrain paint scheme), and yellow grab bars. Siemens Venture passenger cars for the Gold Runner are stainless steel with yellow doors, a dark blue stripe along the windows, and a multi-color stripe along the bottom with yellow plus several shades of blue and purple.

The Pacific Surfliner uses Charger SC-44 locomotives and Surfliner cars in a deep blue and gray paint scheme. The upper half of the passenger cars are deep blue with a white pinstriping, plus a white pinstripe on the bottom of the cars. The stripes continue onto locomotives, with the blue stripe narrowing and curving under the black-painted cab area. Lettering is white and placed in the blue stripe. The Charger locomotives are painted in the same shape as the Northern California units but using the Pacific Surfliner color scheme. Amtrak-owned F59PHI locomotives previously used on the Pacific Surfliner were painted in a scheme to match the Surfliner cars, featuring a large sweeping blue arc running from the front to the top of the locomotive. Amtrak wrapped F59PHI No. 457 in a special scheme to celebrate the 10th anniversary of the Pacific Surfliner and the train's ridership surpassing 25 million. The locomotive's new scheme was released on May 8, 2010, for National Train Day.

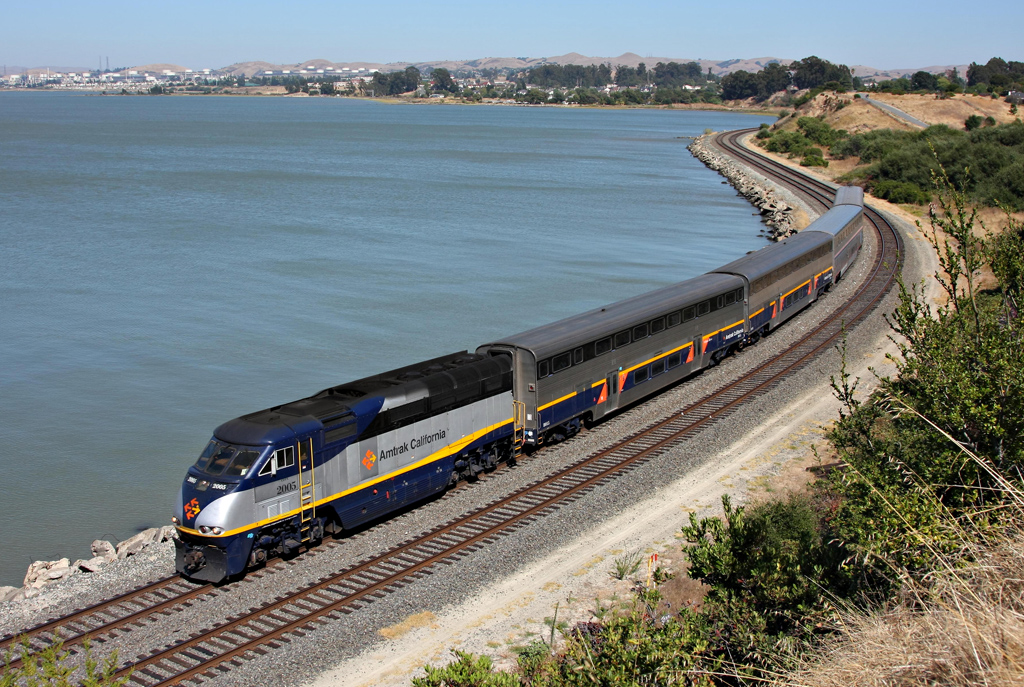
Capitol Corridor train in Amtrak California livery in 2011

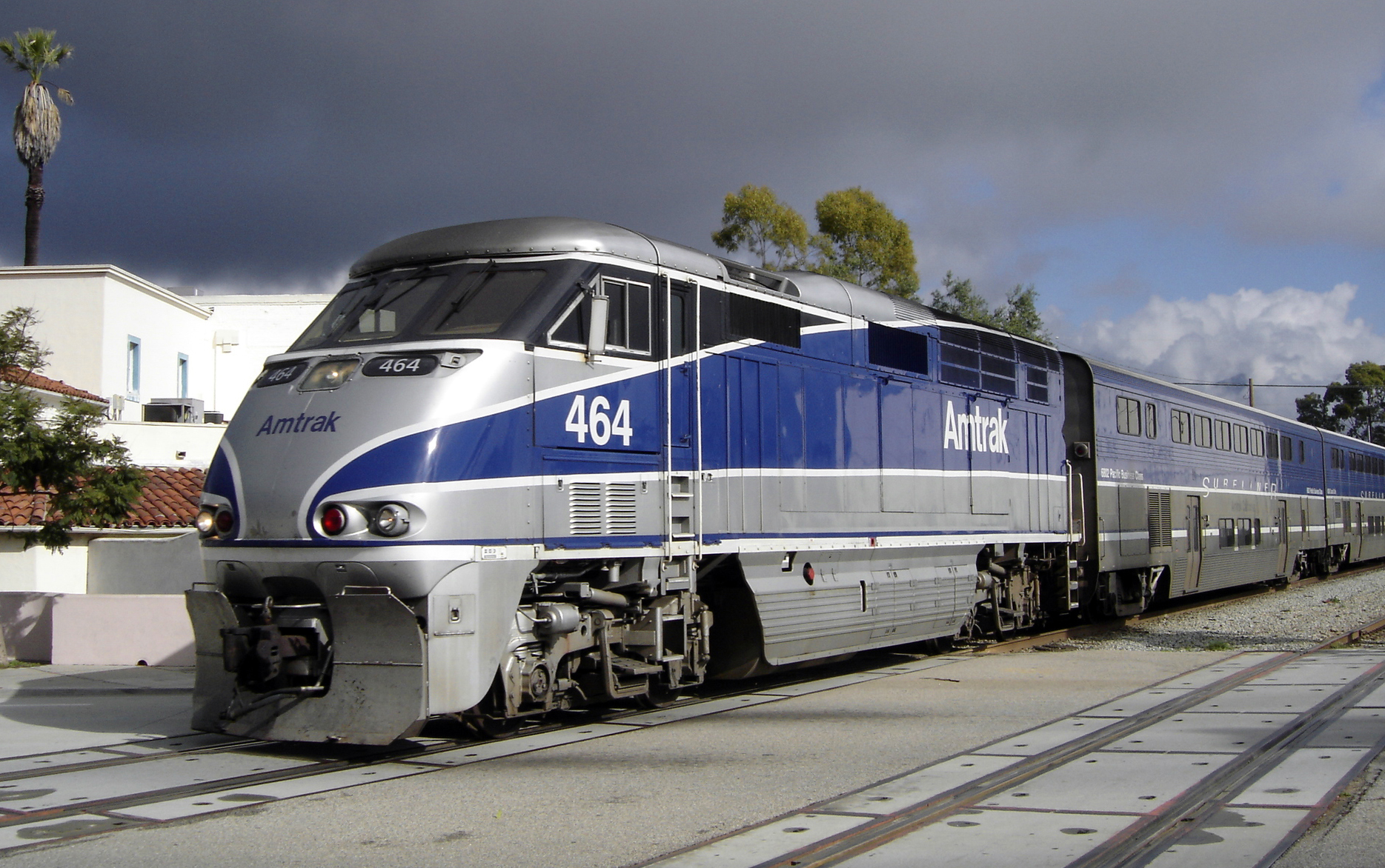
Pacific Surfliner train with an F59PHI locomotive in 2006

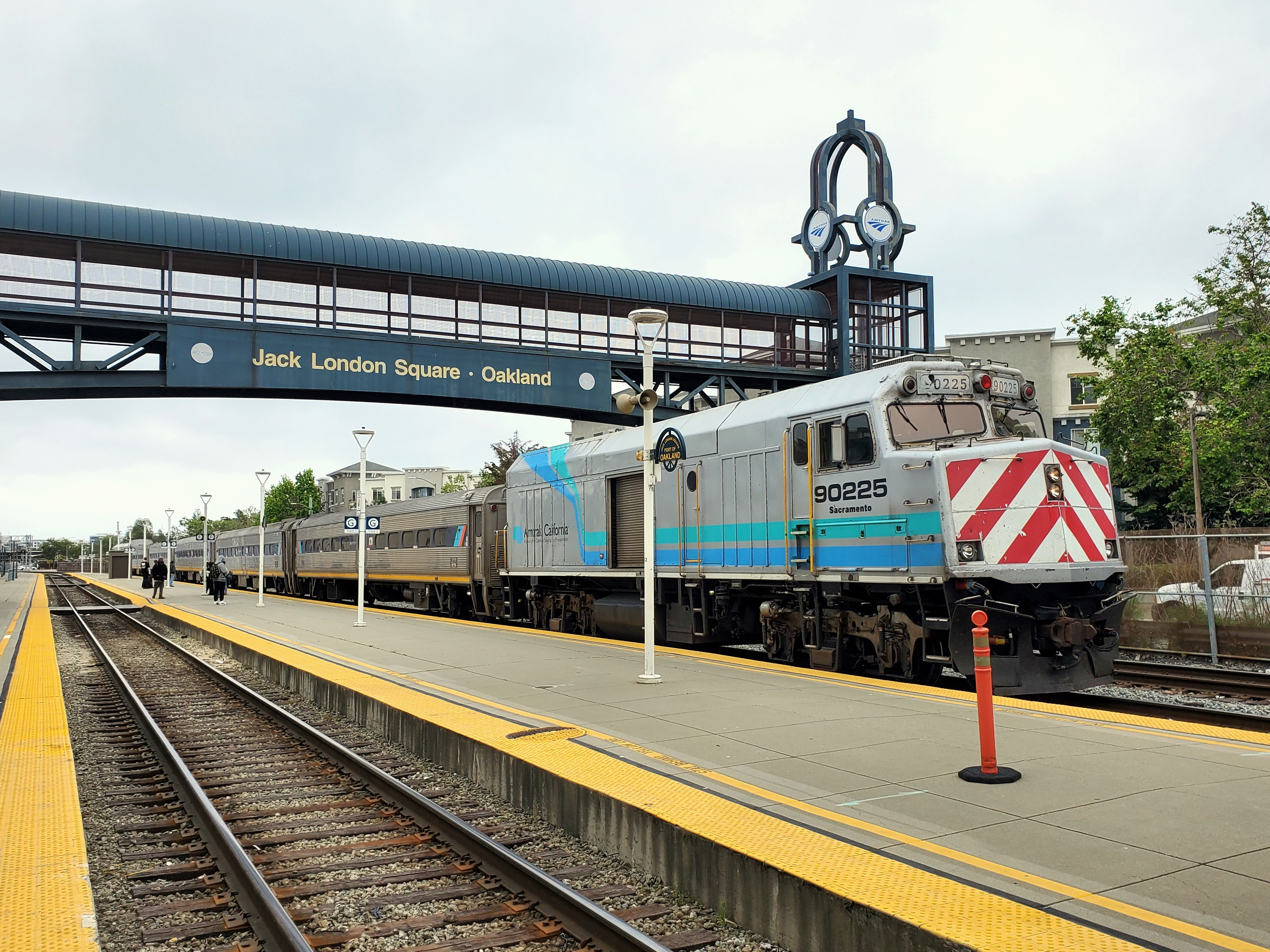
NPCU and Comet IB passenger cars in 2023

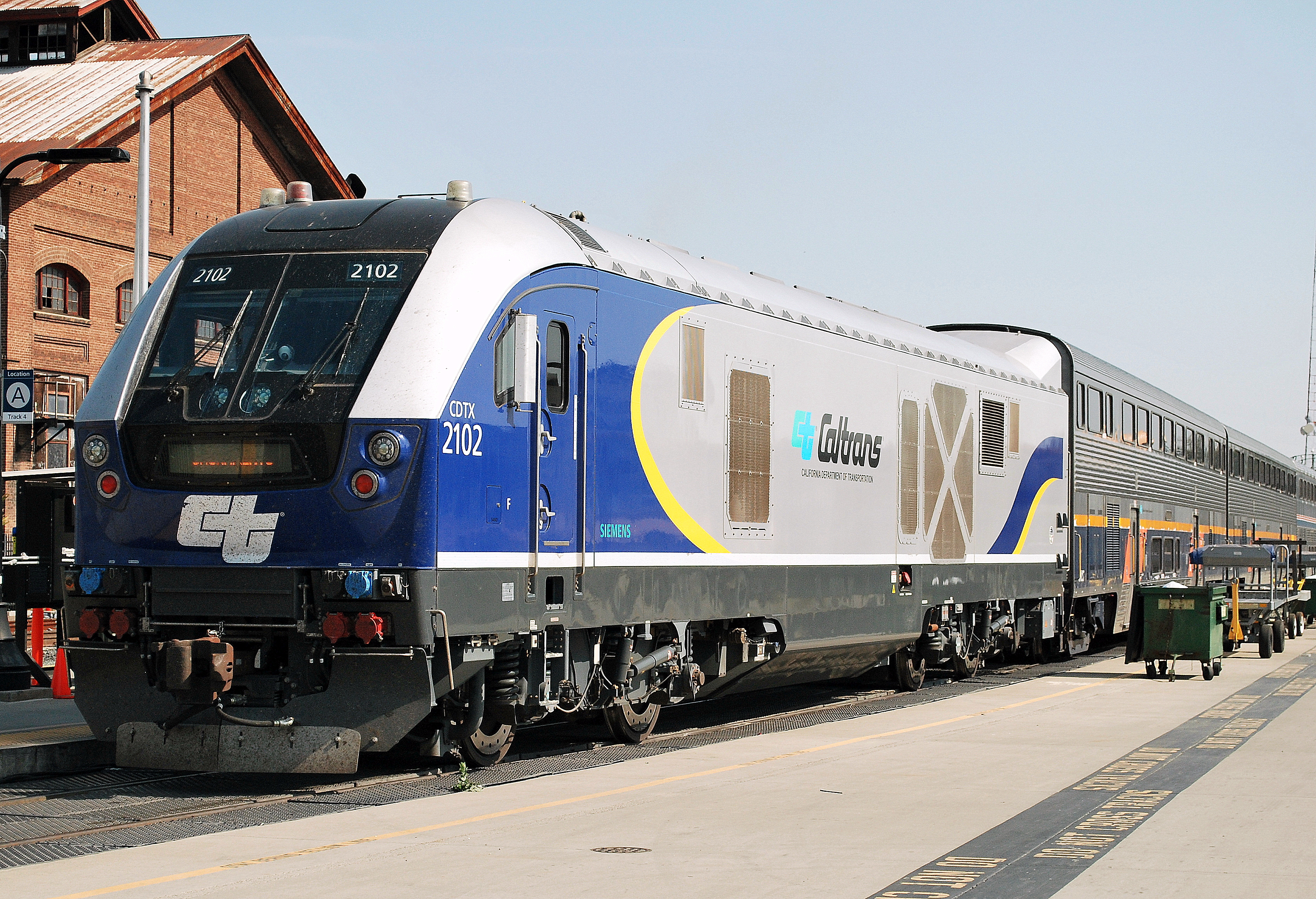
Charger SC-44 locomotive in Amtrak California livery in 2019

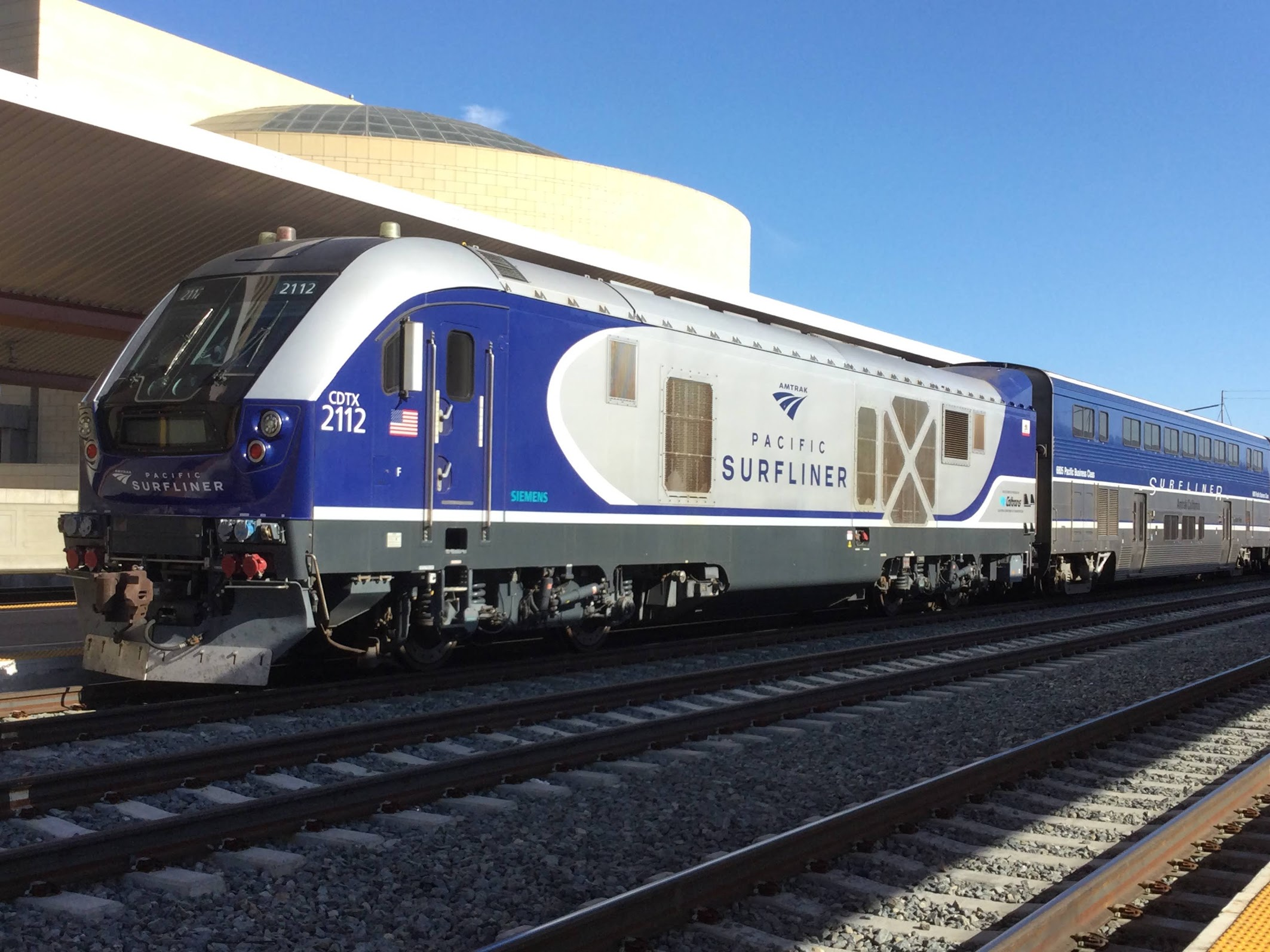
Charger SC-44 locomotive in Pacific Surfliner livery in 2022

Venture SC-44-derived cab car in San Joaquins livery in 2026

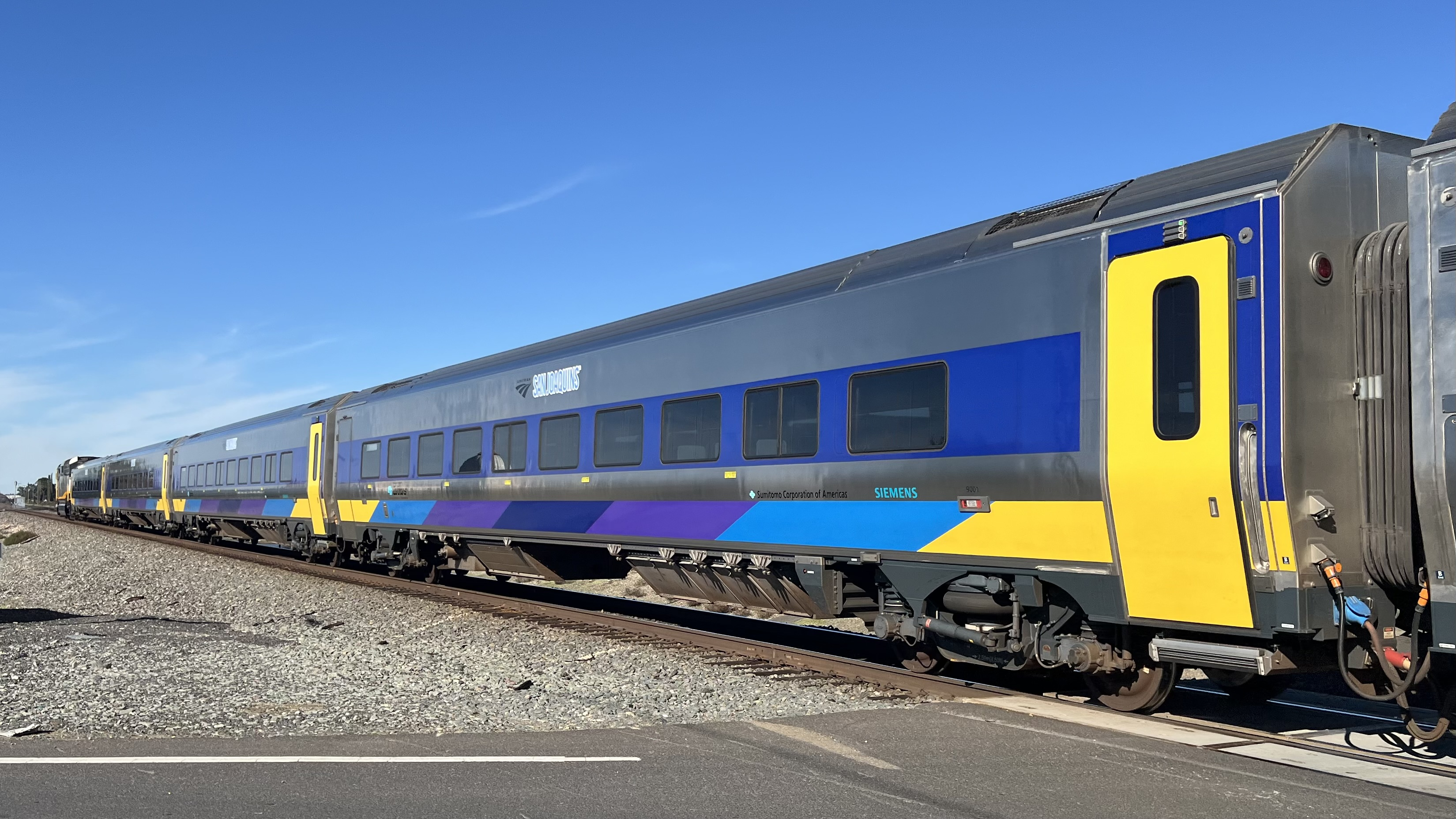
Venture passenger car in San Joaquins livery in 2025

=== Cascades ===
The Cascades service uses two equipment types, both with themed paint schemes – the only revenue equipment not painted in a blue-and-gray-based palette. The older Talgo Series 8 trainsets, Charger SC-44 locomotives, and ex-F40PH NPCUs are painted in a brown, light tan, and dark green scheme. The scheme was created by industrial designer Cesar Vergara, who also styled the GE Genesis locomotive. On the original Charger SC-44 locomotives, the green stripe is narrower and runs along the top and over the cab. The opposite end of the trainsets has a cab car, where the brown and green stripes come to a point, with the top of the cab also painted green. One Talgo Series VI trainset was originally painted in blue, silver, and white for a Los Angeles-Las Vegas service that was never implemented. In 2016, one NPCU, #90250, was wrapped in Seattle Seahawks livery for several months.

The newer Amtrak Airo trainsets with Charger ALC-42E locomotives have a primarily dark green paint scheme with brown and white sill stripes and window accents, plus graphics of Mount Rainier and Mount Hood.

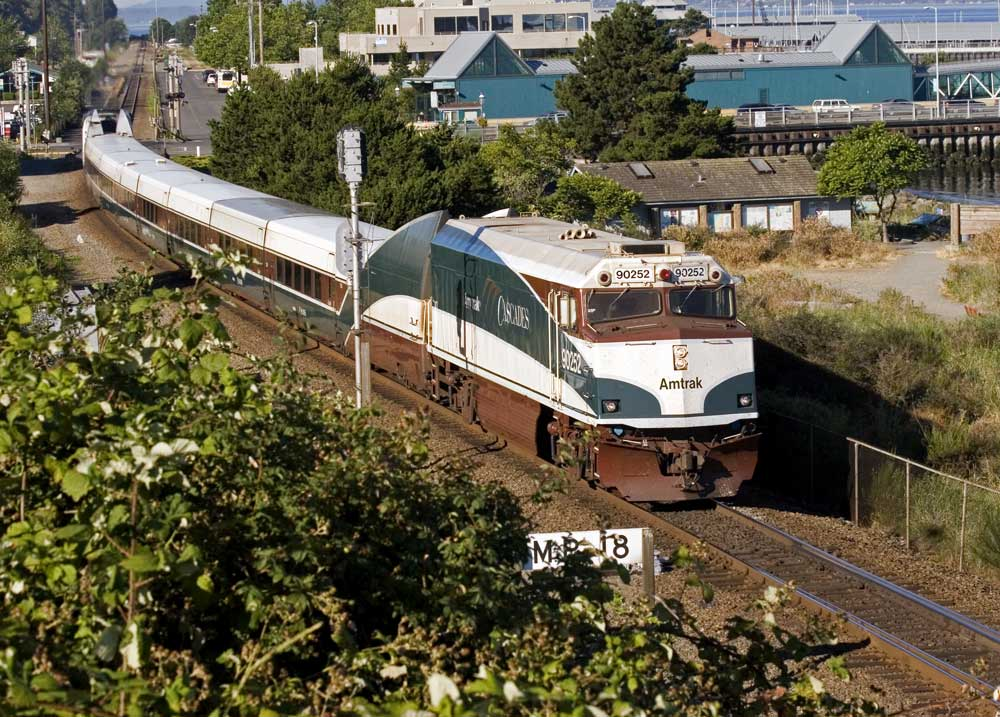
Cascades Talgo Series VI trainset with NPCU in 2006

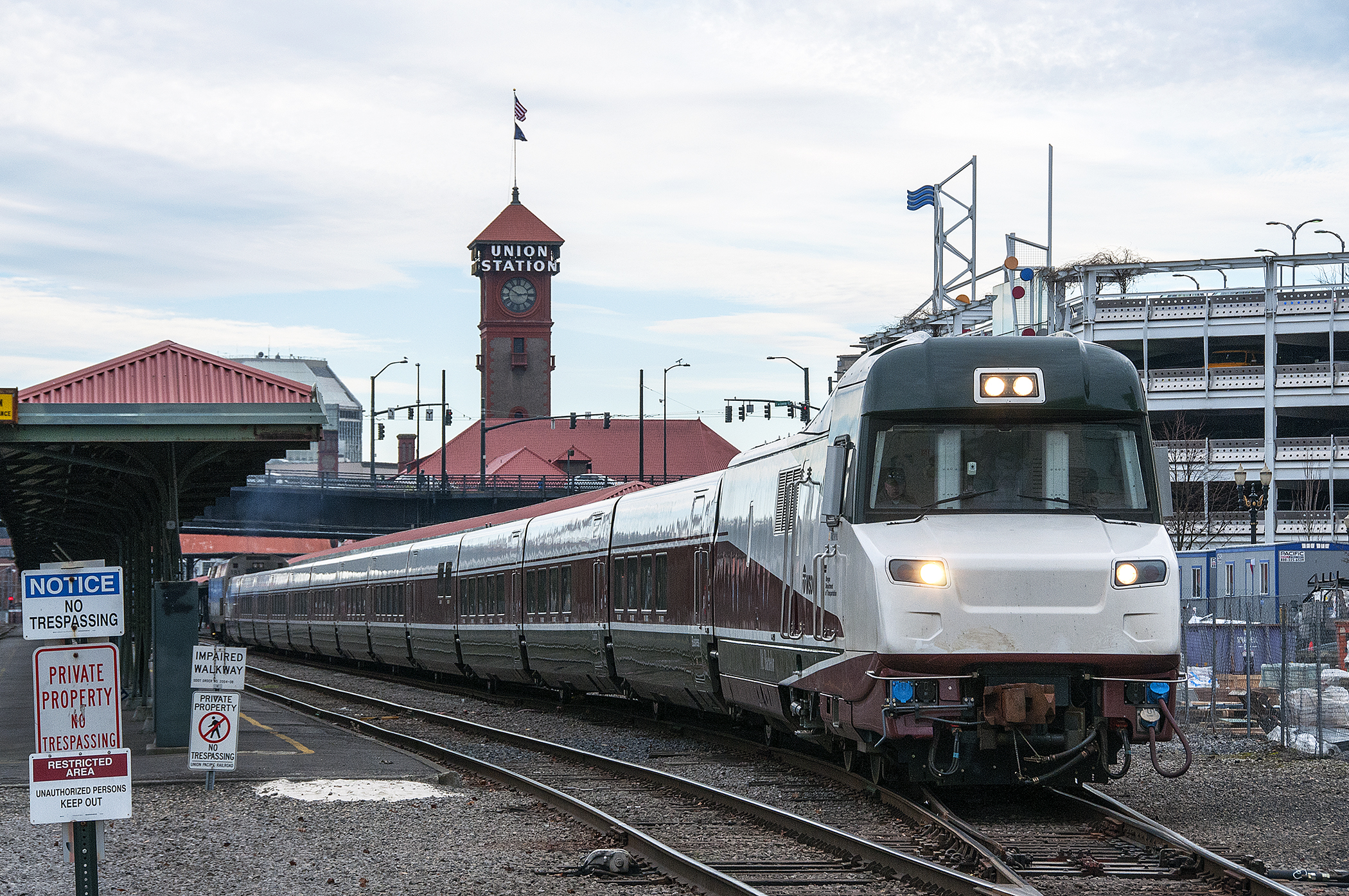
Cab end of a Talgo Series 8 trainset in 2012

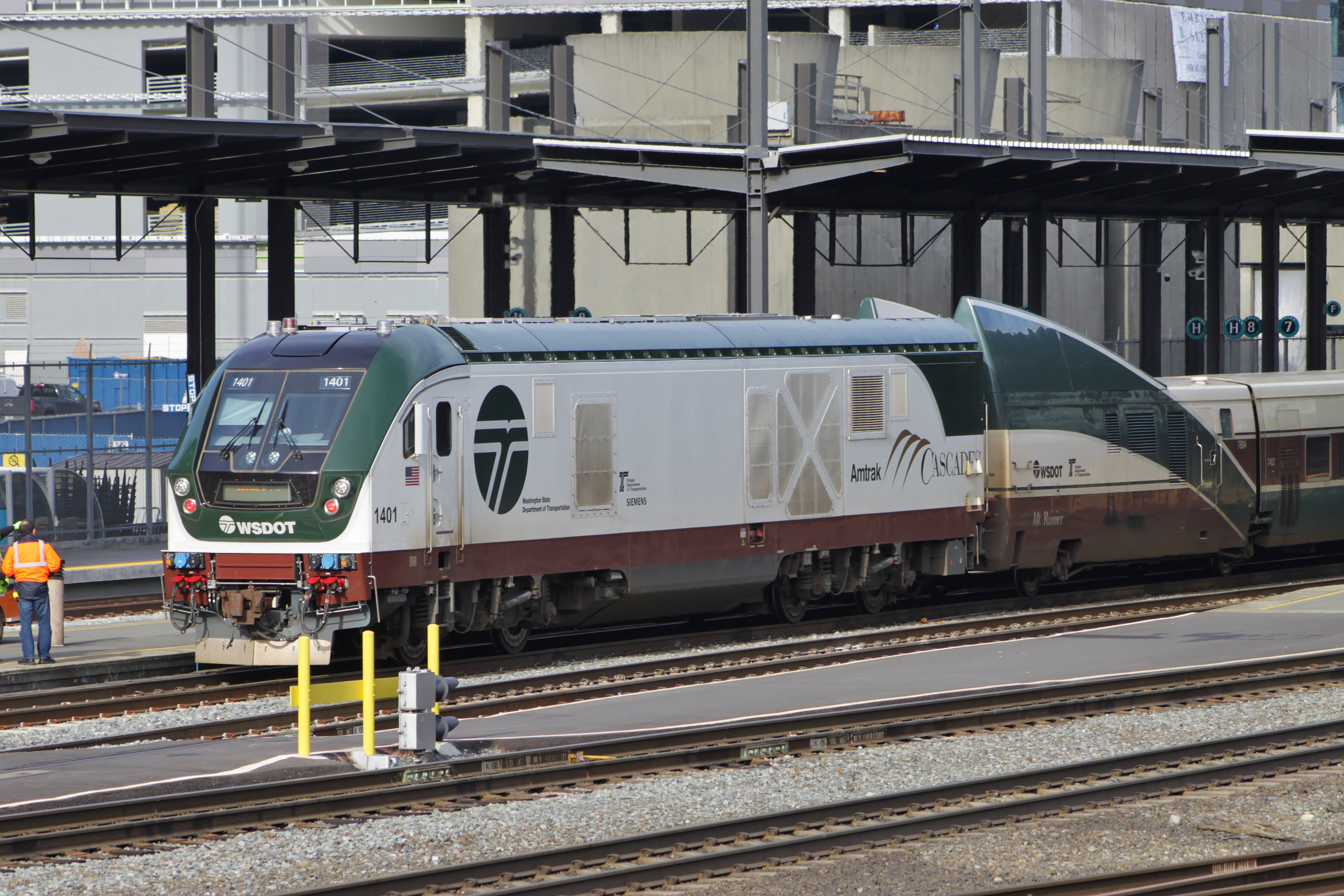
Charger SC-44 locomotive with Talgo train in 2018

Airo trainset in 2026

=== Amtrak Midwest ===
The Charger SC-44 locomotives used on the nine Amtrak Midwest routes (Borealis, Hiawatha, Illini and Saluki, Illinois Zephyr and Carl Sandburg, Lincoln Service, Missouri River Runner, Wolverine, Blue Water, and Pere Marquette) have a blue front with a halftone transition into the gray side, with a red sill stripe. Siemens Venture passenger cars for the services have a matching gray scheme with halftone blue transitions at the end of the window level, with a wider red sill stripe.

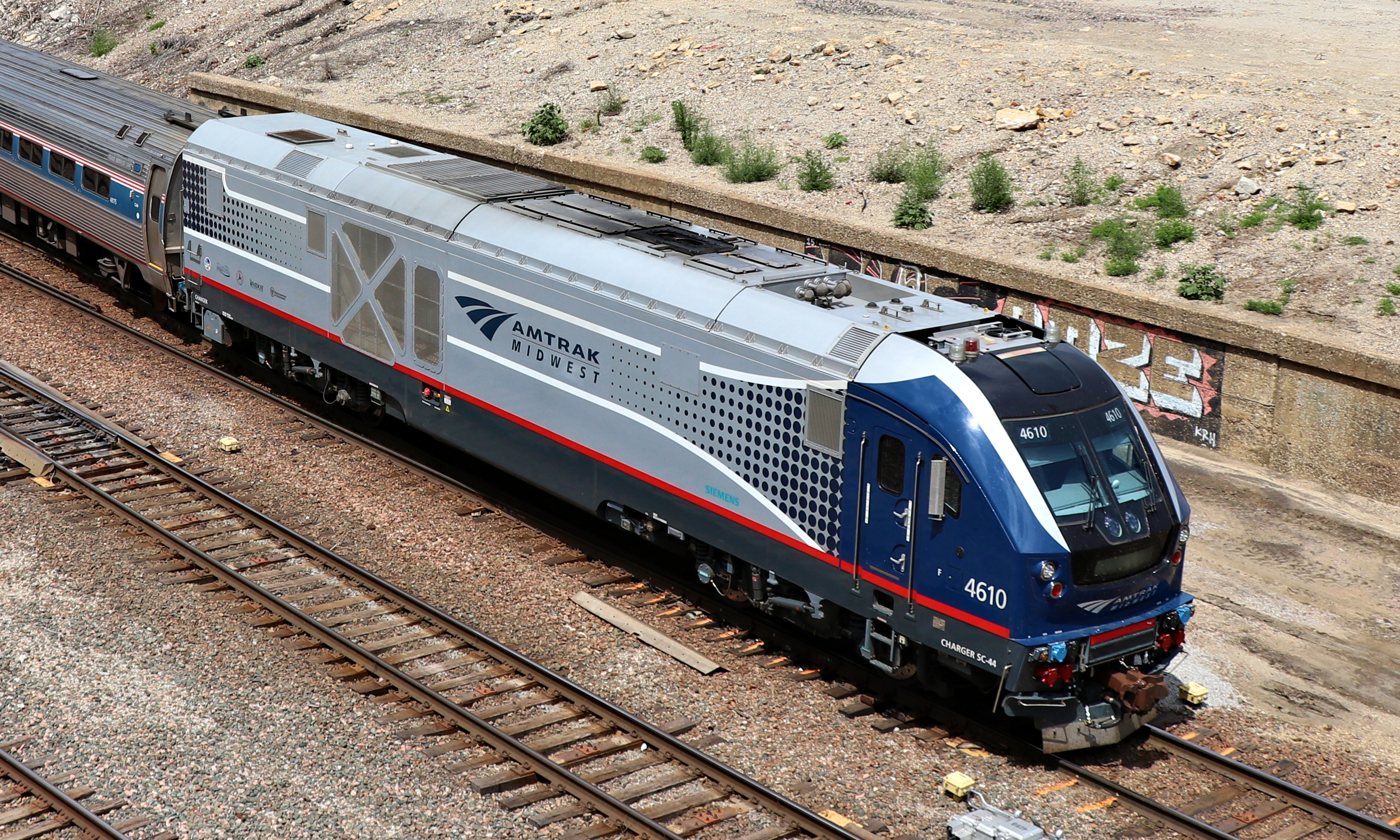
Charger SC-44 locomotive in 2018

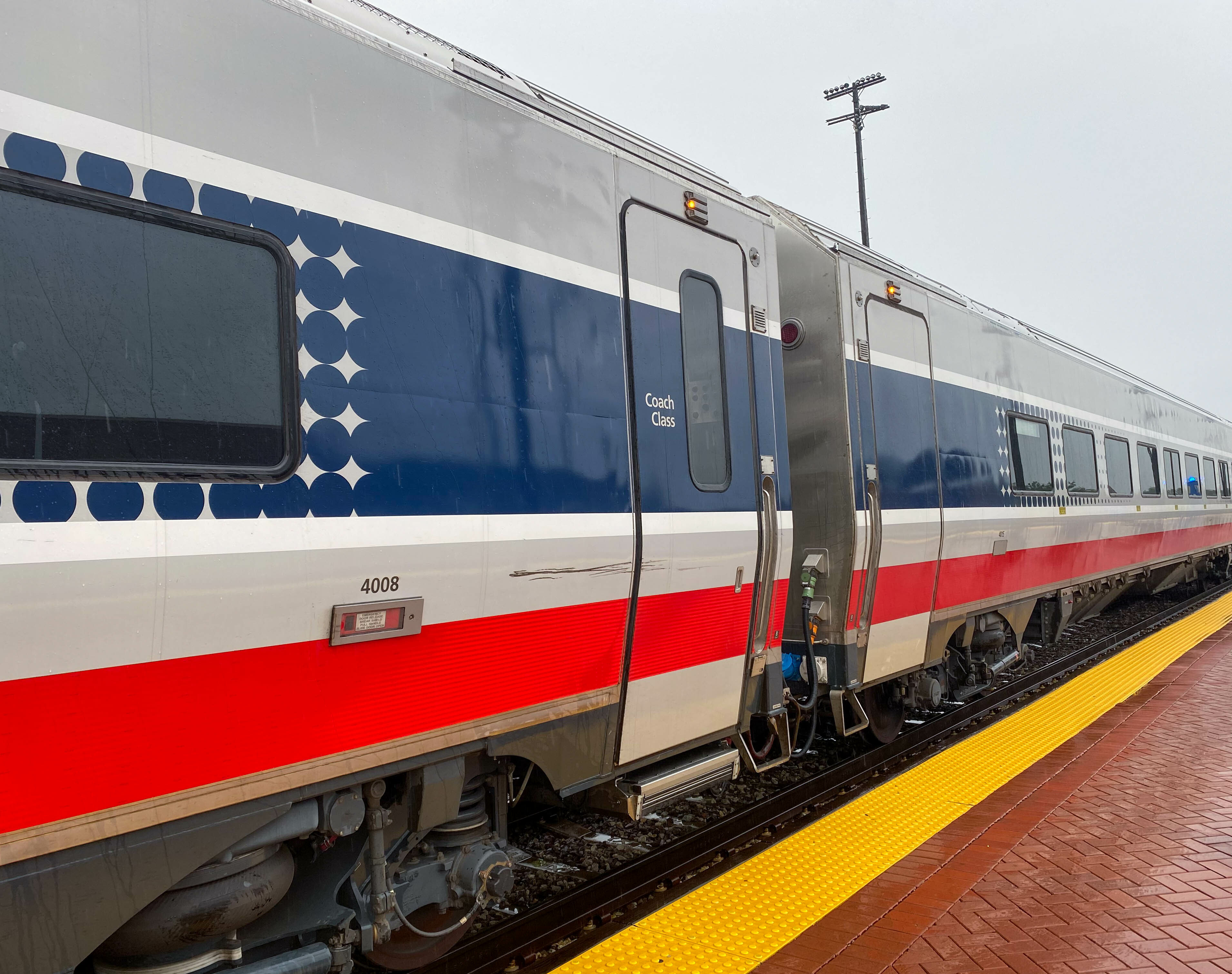
Siemens Venture cars in 2022

=== Piedmont ===
The equipment used on the Piedmont is painted in North Carolina state colors, with wide blue stripes on the passenger cars and blue fronts on the locomotives.

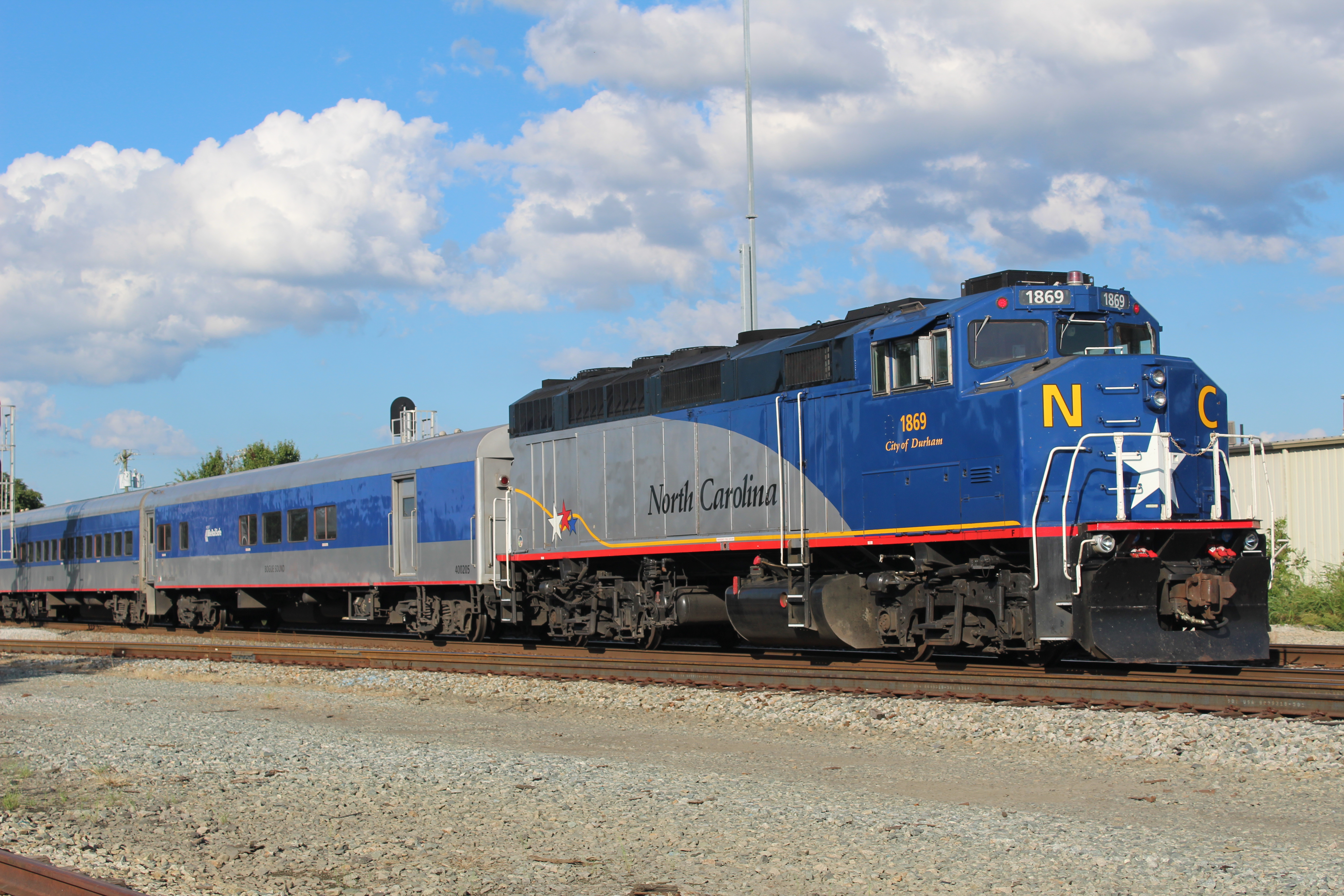
Piedmont train in 2016

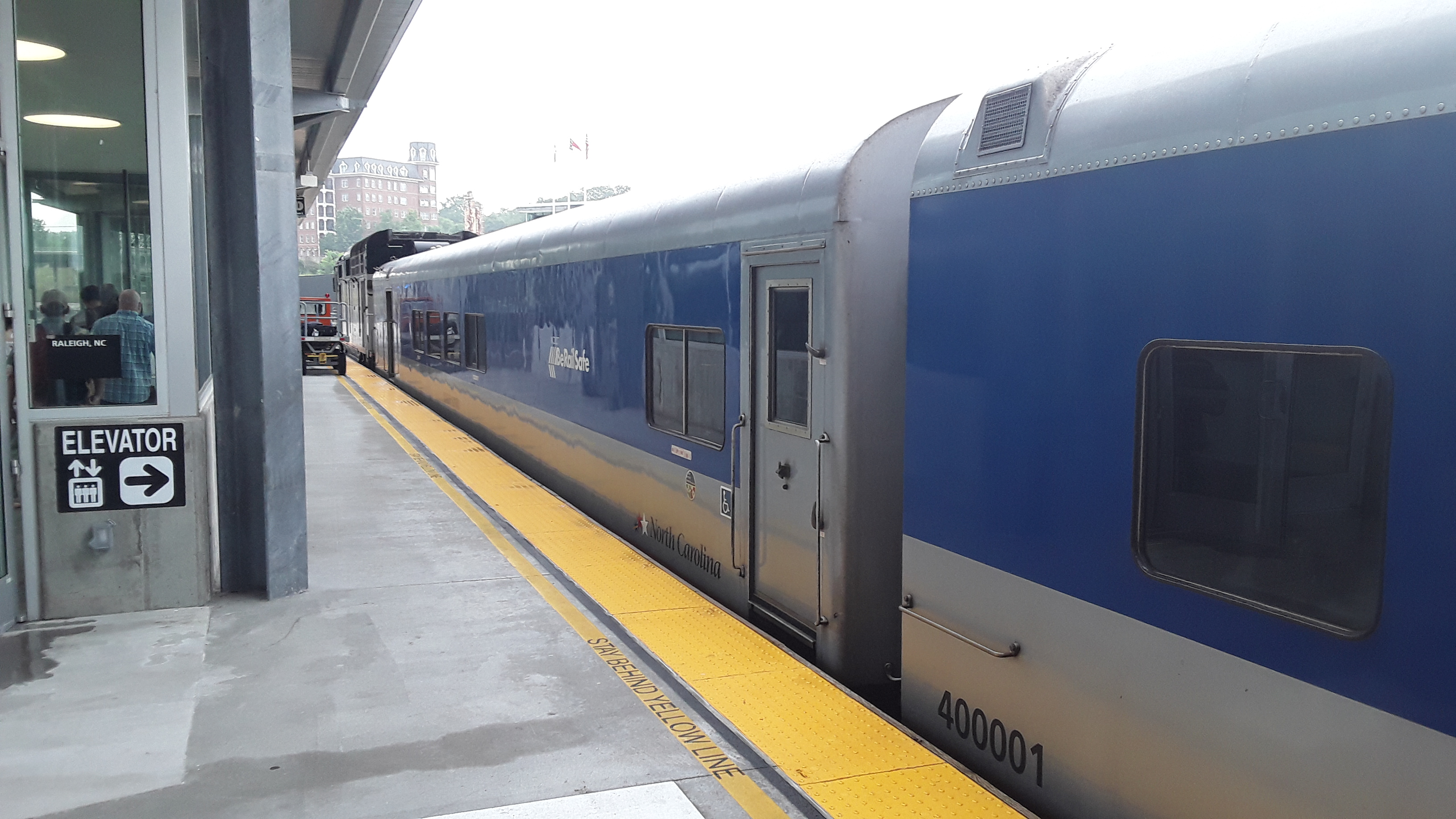
Piedmont refurbished passenger cars in 2019

=== Other routes ===
- Avelia Liberty trainsets, used on the Acela, have a white window stripe with blue above and below. The lower blue area dissolves into white on the power cars, which have gray noses. Red highlights include sill stripes, doors, and pantographs.
- From its 1974 introduction until 1977, the Adirondack used Delaware and Hudson Railway-owned equipment painted in the railroad's blue and gold scheme.
- In the late 1990s, the Adirondack, Ethan Allen Express, and Vermonter each had a baggage car painted with a mural dedicated to the route.
- The single RTL Turboliner rebuilt in 1995 for the Empire Service had a one-off paint scheme with grey sides, a red stripe below the window, and white fronts.
- Two Talgo Series 8 trainsets were bought for use in Wisconsin on the Hiawatha, but never operated. They were painted white with red stripes to match the signature colors of the Wisconsin Badgers sports teams.
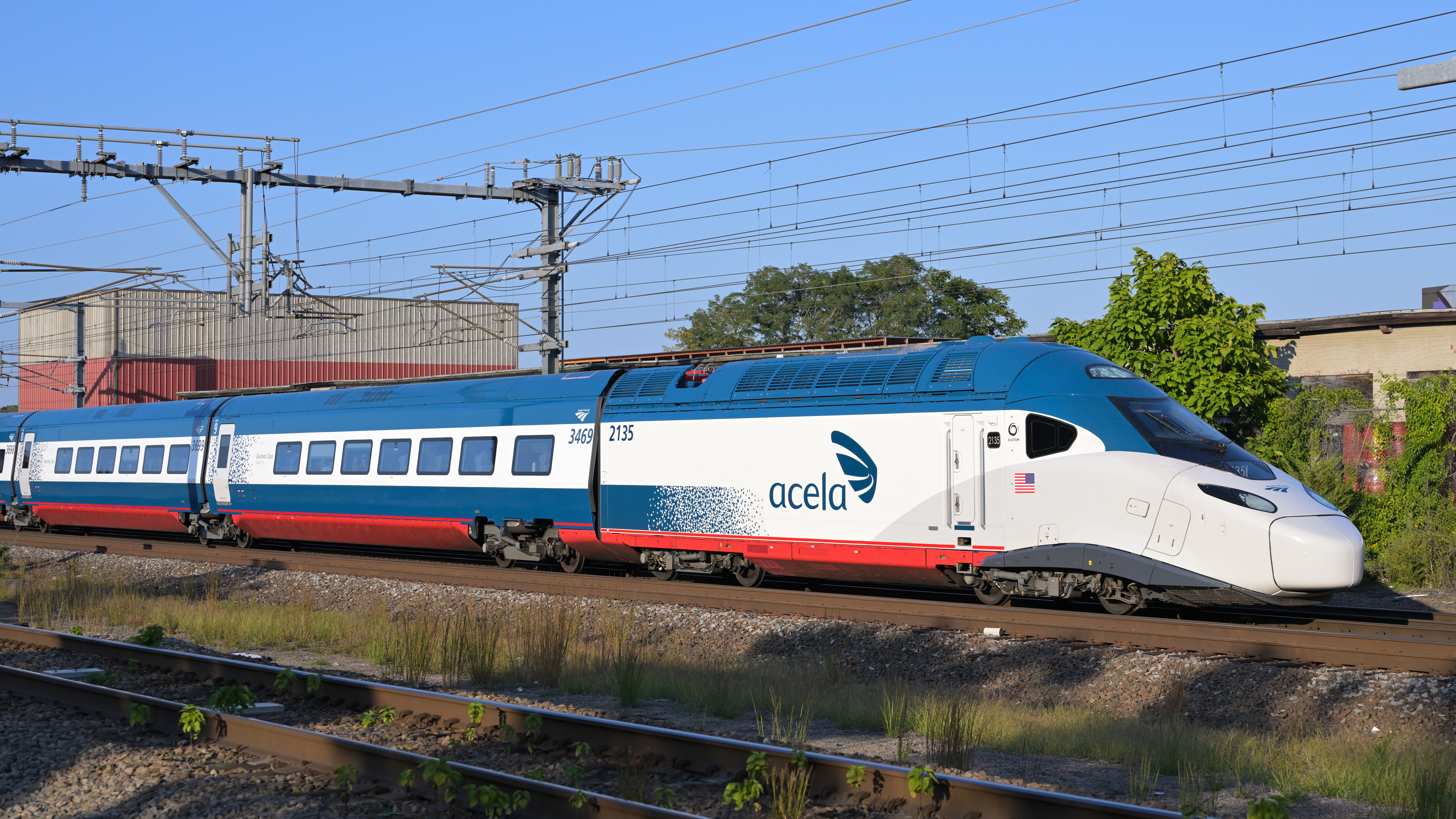
Avelia Liberty trainset in 2025

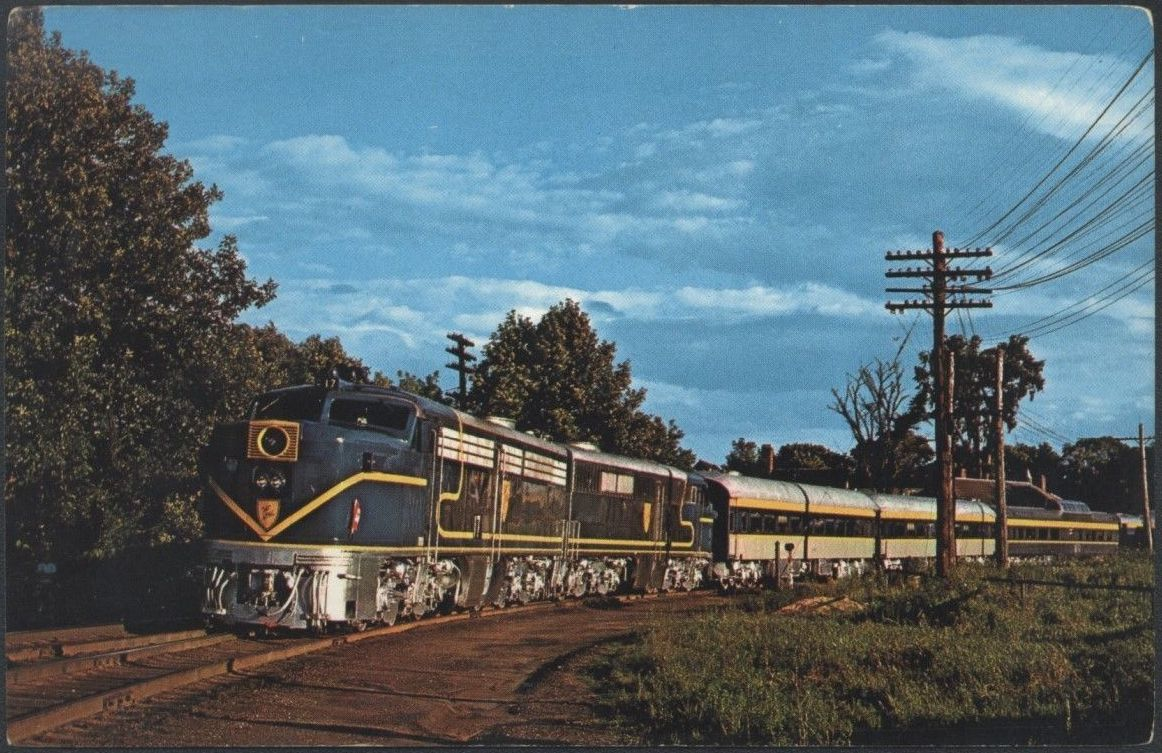
The Adirondack with Delaware and Hudson Railway equipment in 1974

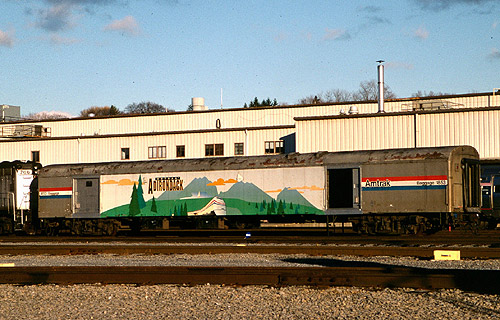
Adirondack baggage car in 2004

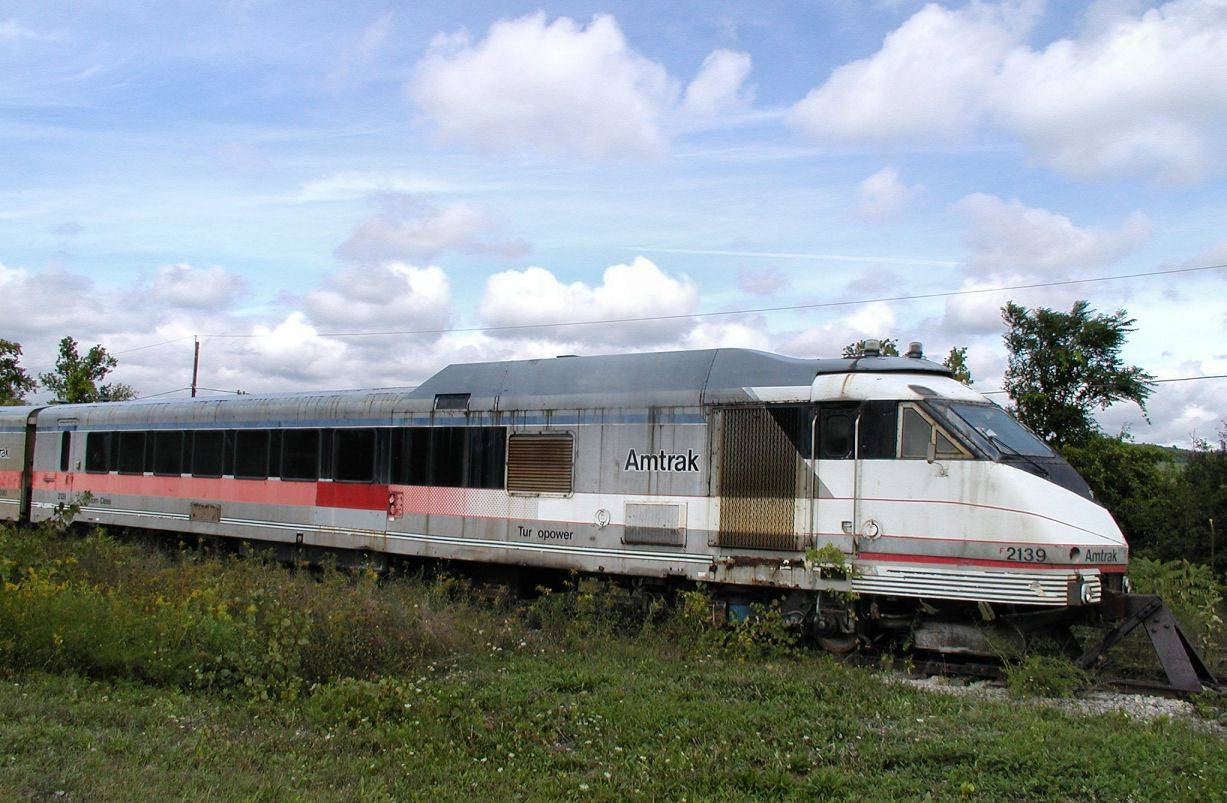
RTL-II trainset in 2006

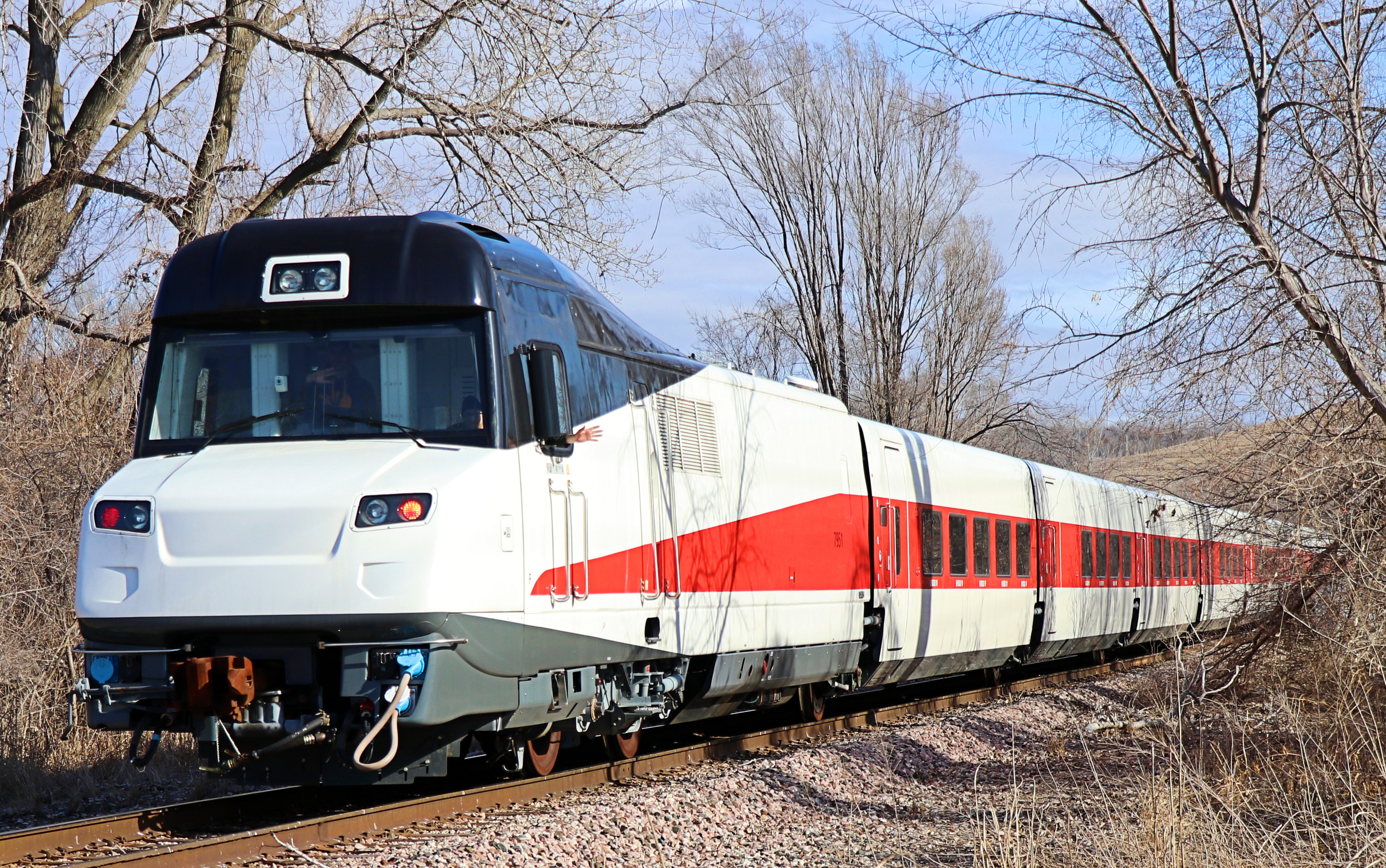
Talgo Series 8 trainset in 2018

== Special paint schemes ==
=== "Day 1" livery ===
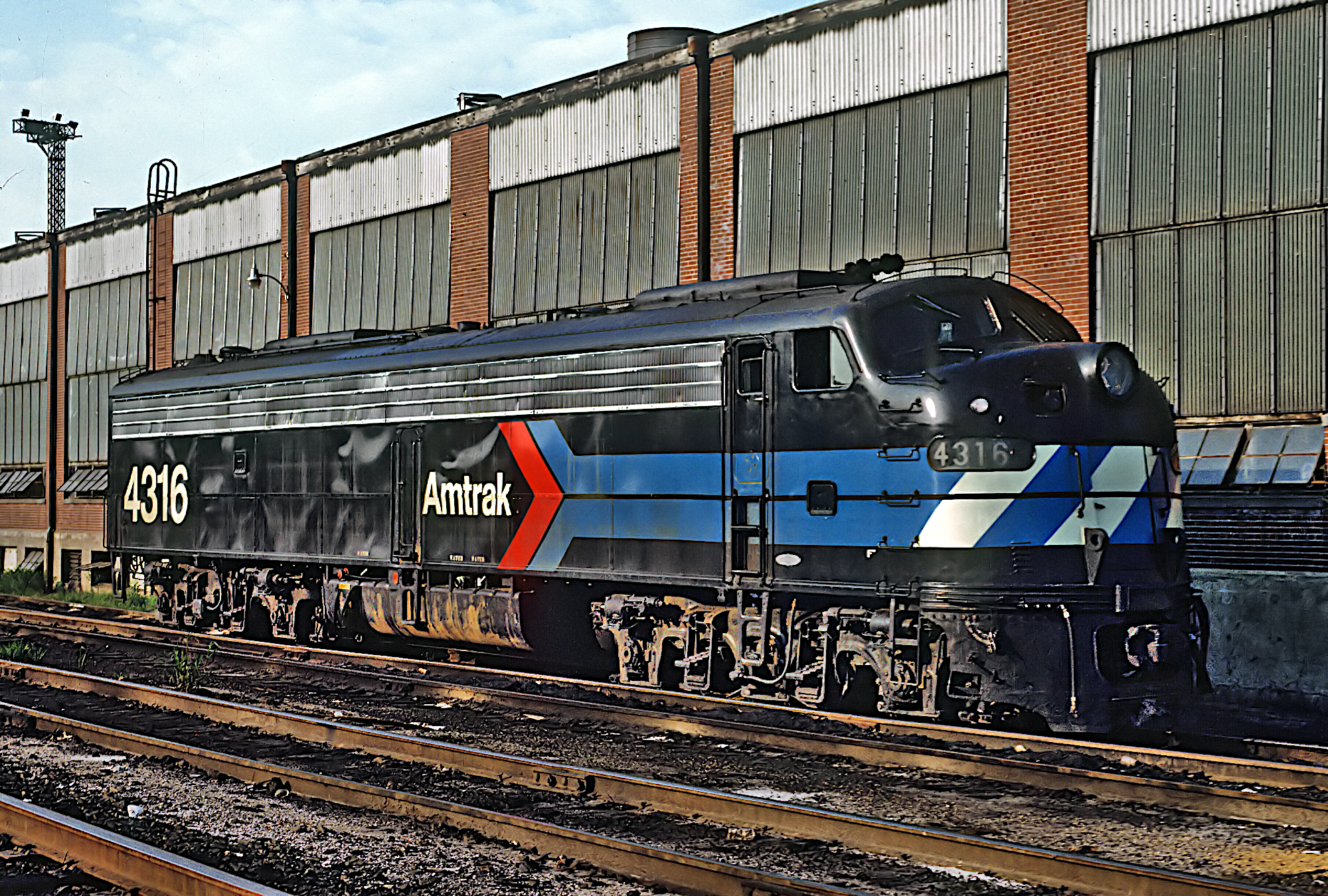
EMD E8 No. 4316 in August 1971

EMD E8 No. 4316 and coach 1589 were painted for display in New York when Amtrak began service in May 1971; they saw later use on the Broadway Limited. The locomotive was painted black; the Chevron "pointless arrow" logo on each side wrapped around the front with blue and white safety stripes. The coach has a wide blue window stripe with a large Amtrak logo near one end. Amtrak has retroactively referred to this paint scheme as the "Day 1" livery.

=== 40th anniversary heritage units ===
For Amtrak's 40th anniversary in 2011, the railroad painted four P42DC Genesis locomotives with special heritage unit liveries honoring the Phase I through Phase IV paint schemes. From January through April 2011, Amtrak's Beech Grove Shops outside Indianapolis repainted the units and sent them north on the Hoosier State to Chicago, where they were cycled into regular service on other routes. The Anniversary locomotives were selected from units scheduled for repainting or recent wreck rebuilds. The first repainted locomotive was No. 145 in Phase III paint, which led the Capitol Limited on January 30, 2011. Three other locomotives followed: Nos. 156 in Phase I, 66 in Phase II, and 184 in Phase IV. Other locomotives, beginning with P42DC No. 130 in Phase II livery in 2016, were repainted to replace heritage units that were damaged in collisions.

The 40th Anniversary Exhibit Train consisted of P40DC locomotive No. 822, NPCU No. 406, modified Budd 10-6 heritage sleeper/Crew Dorm No. 10020 Pacific Bend, three heritage baggage cars used to house exhibits, and Amfleet cafe car No. 85999, used as a gift shop. The whole train was painted in Phase III.

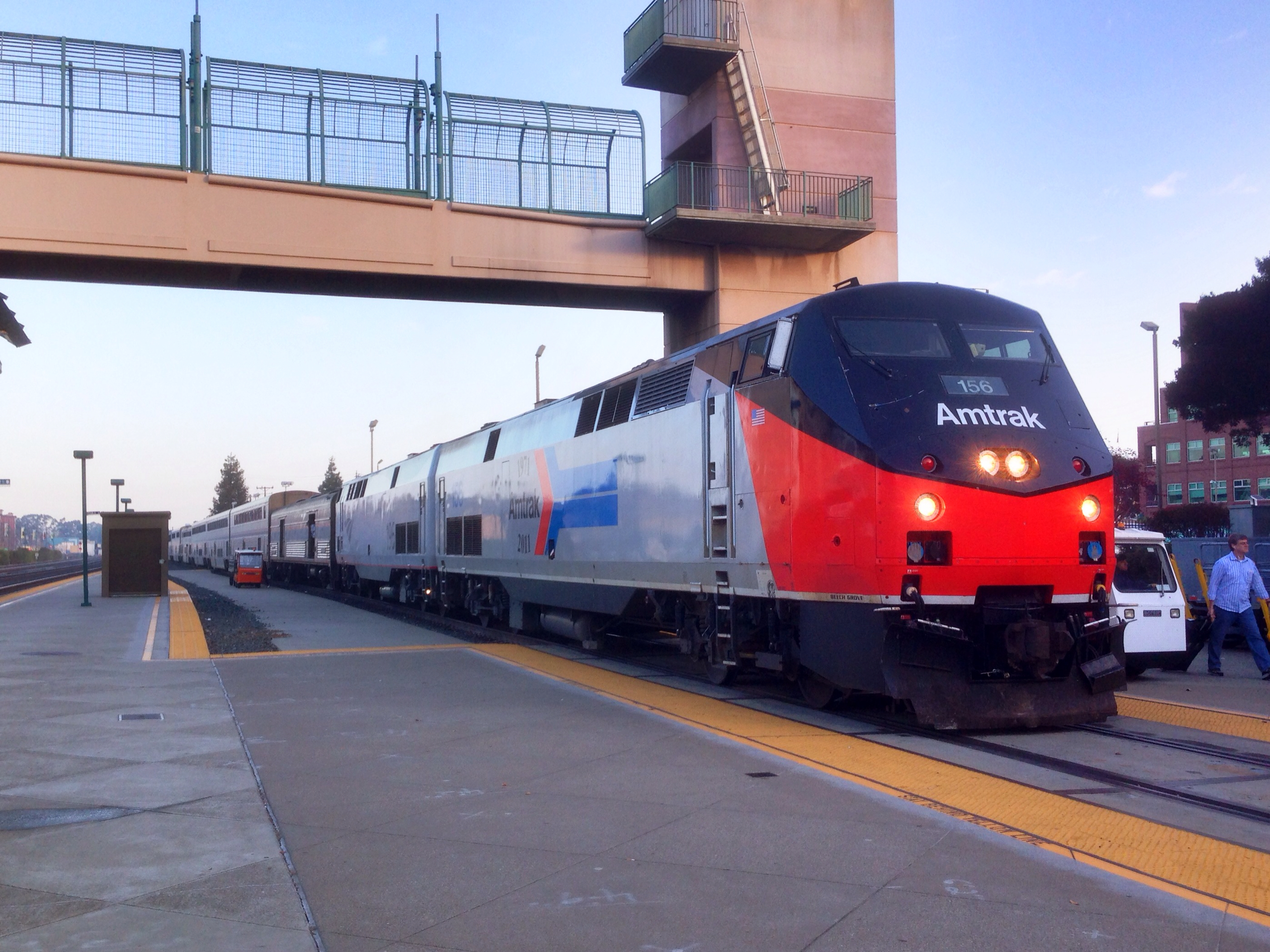
P42DC No. 156 in Phase I paint

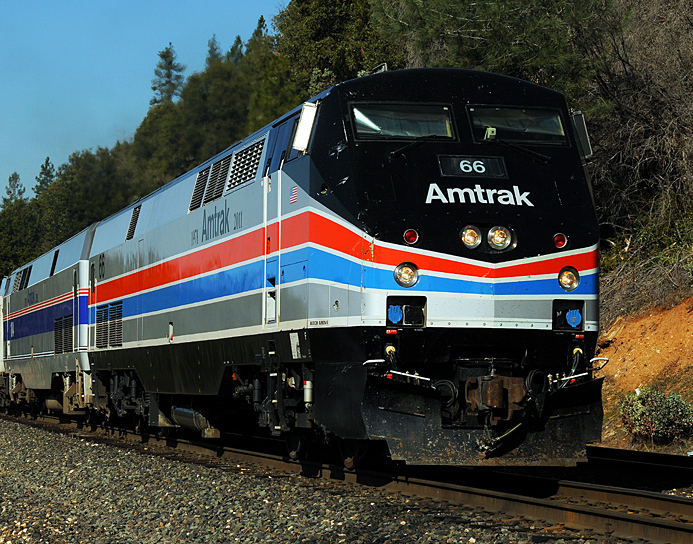
P42DC No. 66 in Phase II paint

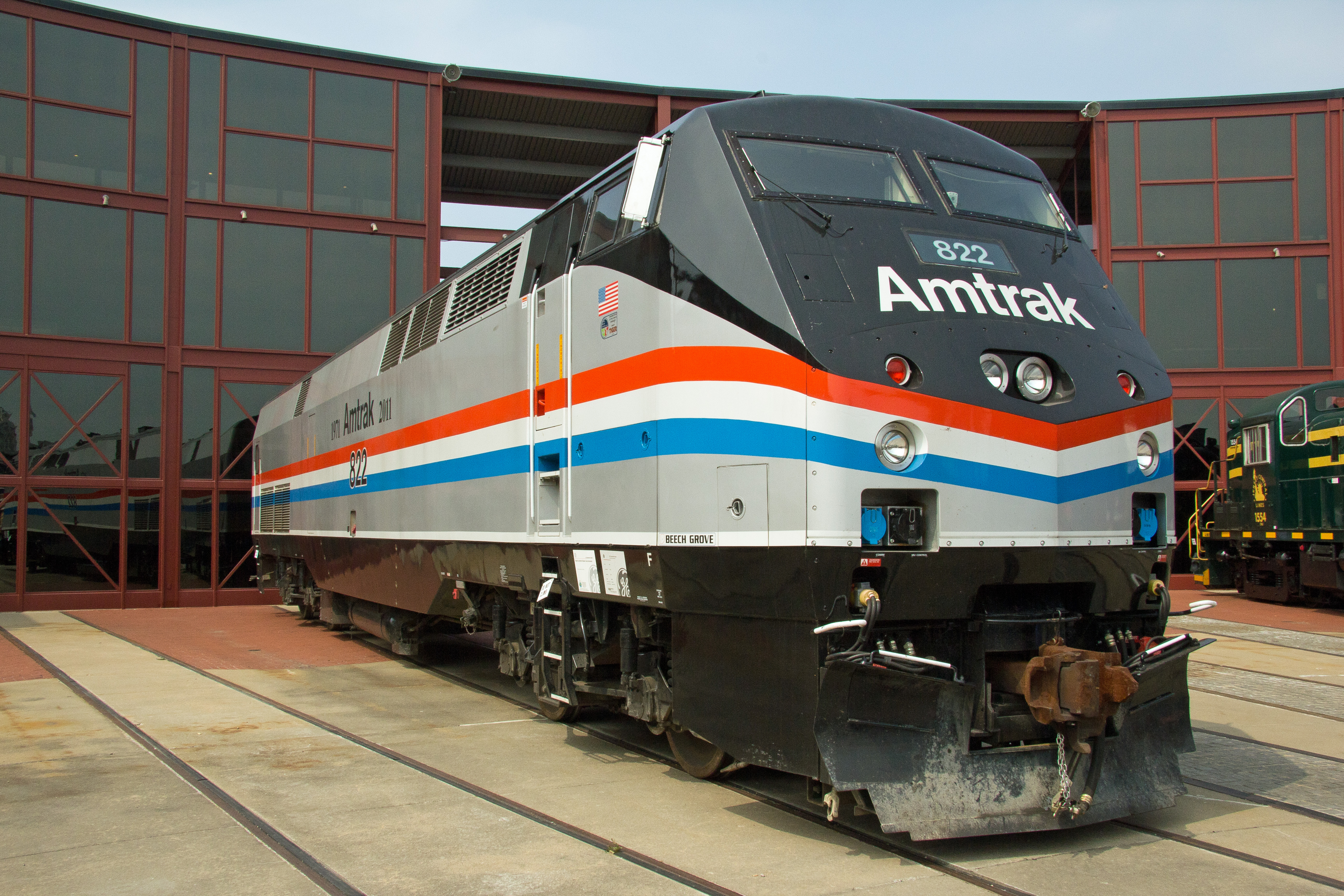
P40DC No. 822 in Phase III paint

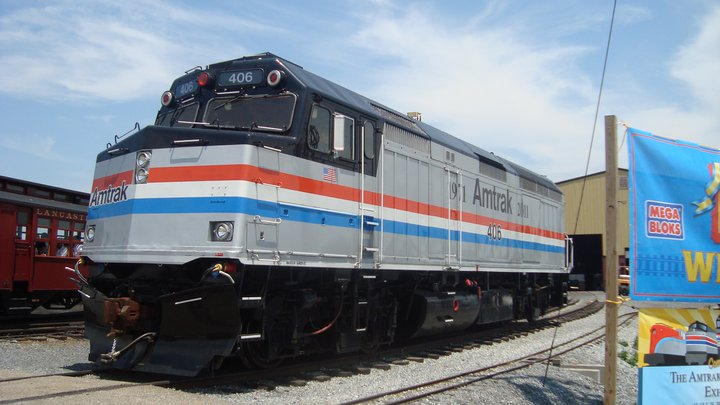
NPCU No. 406 in Phase III paint

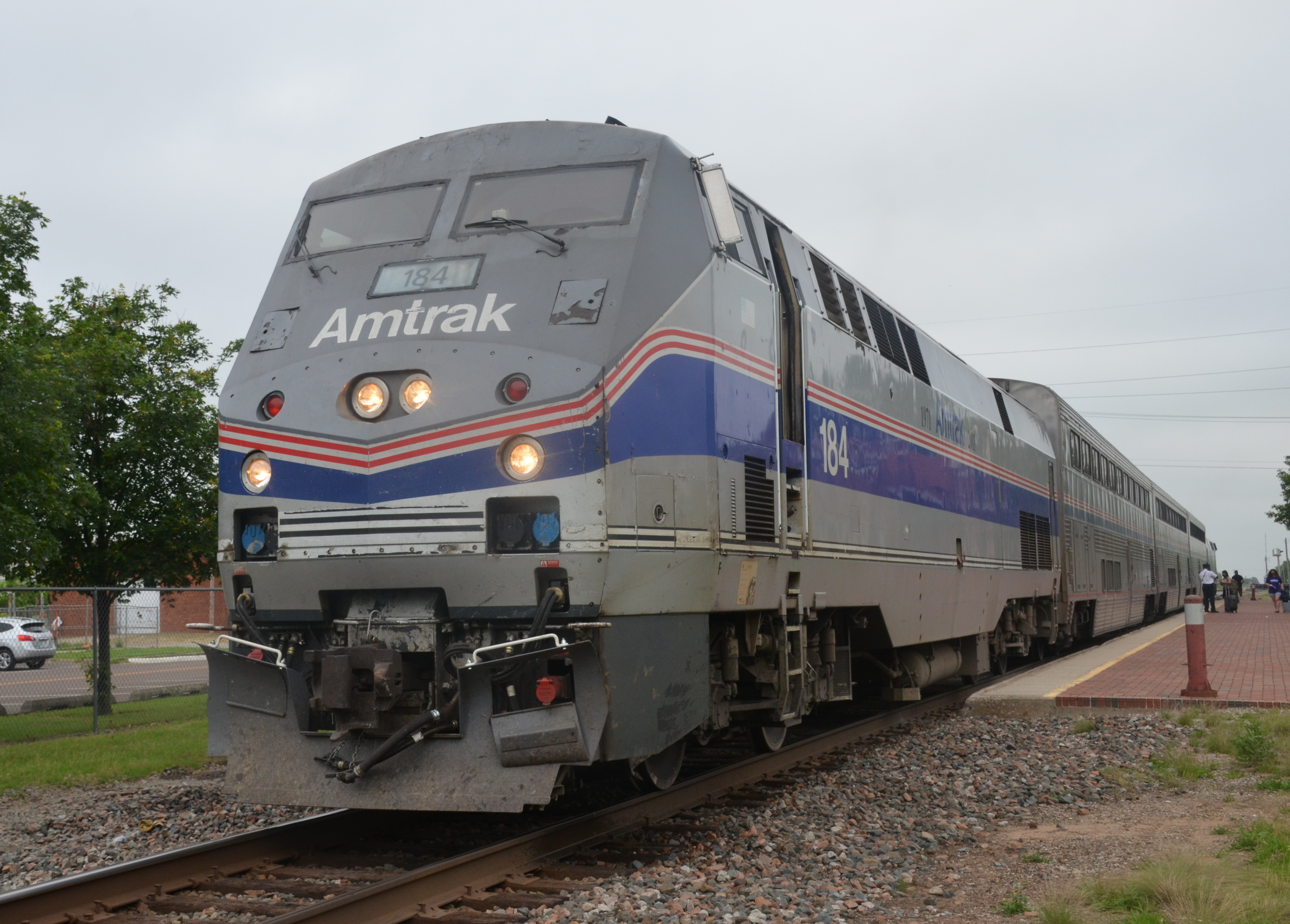
P42DC No. 184 in Phase IV paint

=== 50th anniversary heritage units ===
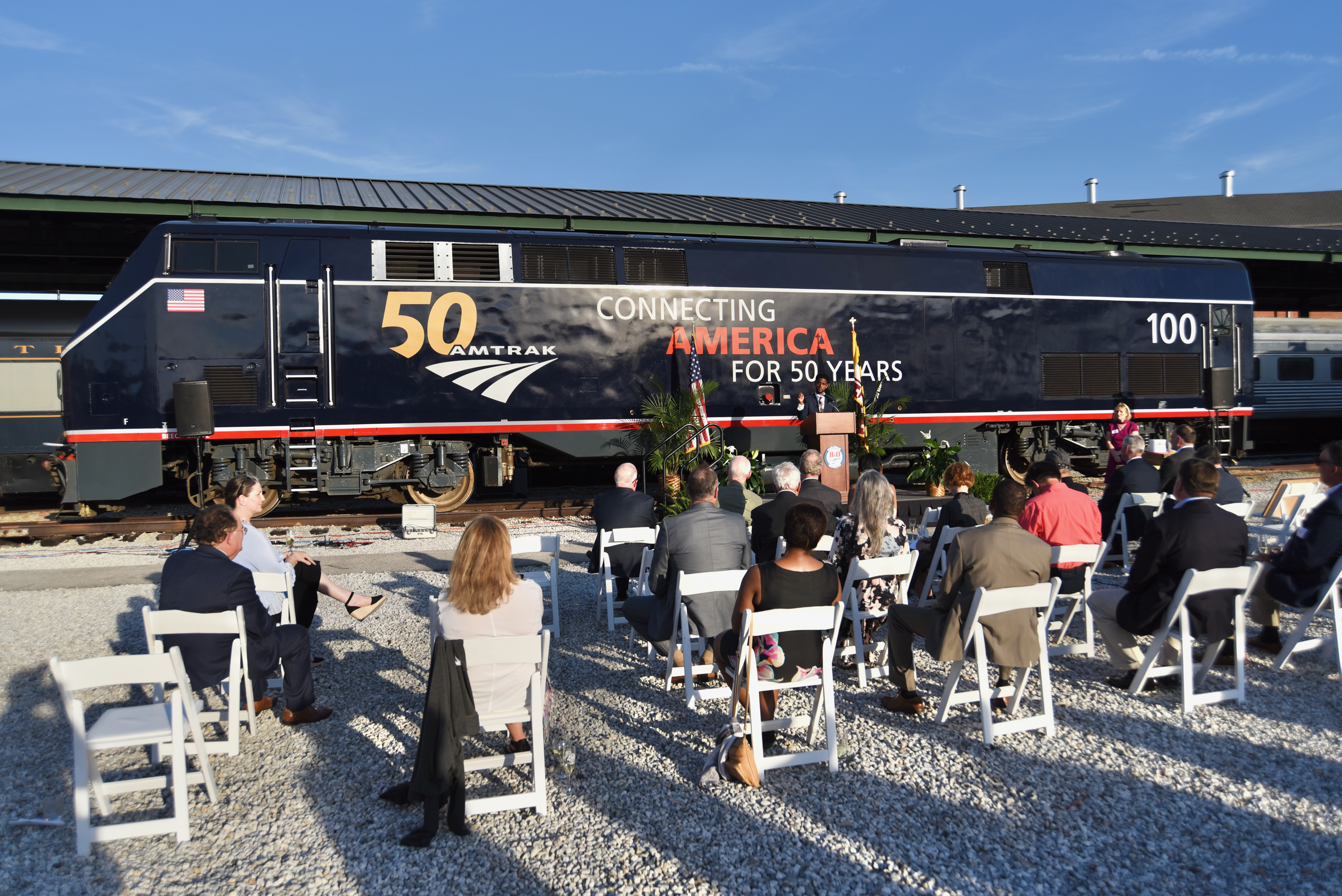
P42DC 100 in "Midnight Blue" 50th anniversary livery

On March 16, 2021, Amtrak announced the release of six heritage paint schemes, all with an "Amtrak 50" logo on the side, to be applied to five Genesis locomotives and one Charger ALC-42 locomotive. The liveries include heritage versions of the black "Day 1" livery on ALC-42 No. 301, a Phase I livery on P42 No. 161, a Phase III "Pepsi Can" livery on P42 No. 160, a Phase V livery on P42 No. 46, and a Phase VI livery on P42 No. 108 that is similar to the first ALC-42 units. The sixth scheme was "Midnight Blue," a dark blue livery on P42 No. 100 celebrating employees who "keep passengers moving across the nation all throughout the night". On December 9, 2021, Amtrak announced that ACS-64 locomotive No. 662 had been wrapped in modified Phase III livery as a promotion for Train Sim World 2.

=== Other special paint schemes ===
- The Amtrak California routes have wrapped locomotives to promote the Operation Lifesaver safety campaign. The decals featured bright designs with slogans about being safe around railroad tracks. Amtrak released its own Operation Lifesaver scheme on P42DC No. 203 on January 12, 2022.
- The first three ACS-64 units released from Siemens in 2013 had special decals applied. Locomotive Nos. 600 and 601 received a large American flag on the sides as well as smaller logos for Siemens & Amtrak. Locomotive No. 602 had a "Reliability - Efficiency - Mobility" promotional graphic on the sides. All three were later repainted with a conventional Phase V scheme before entering service.
- In June 2013, P42DC No. 42 was painted in a red, white, black, and dark blue scheme with a large logo on the side saying "America's Railroad Salutes our Veterans". A blue band near the wheelbase contains 50 white stars. ACS-64 No. 642 and NPCUs Nos. 90208 and 90221 received similar paint schemes in 2015 and 2016.
P42DC No. 203 in Operation Lifesaver livery

P42DC No. 42 in the "America's Railroad Salutes our Veterans" livery

== Non-revenue equipment ==
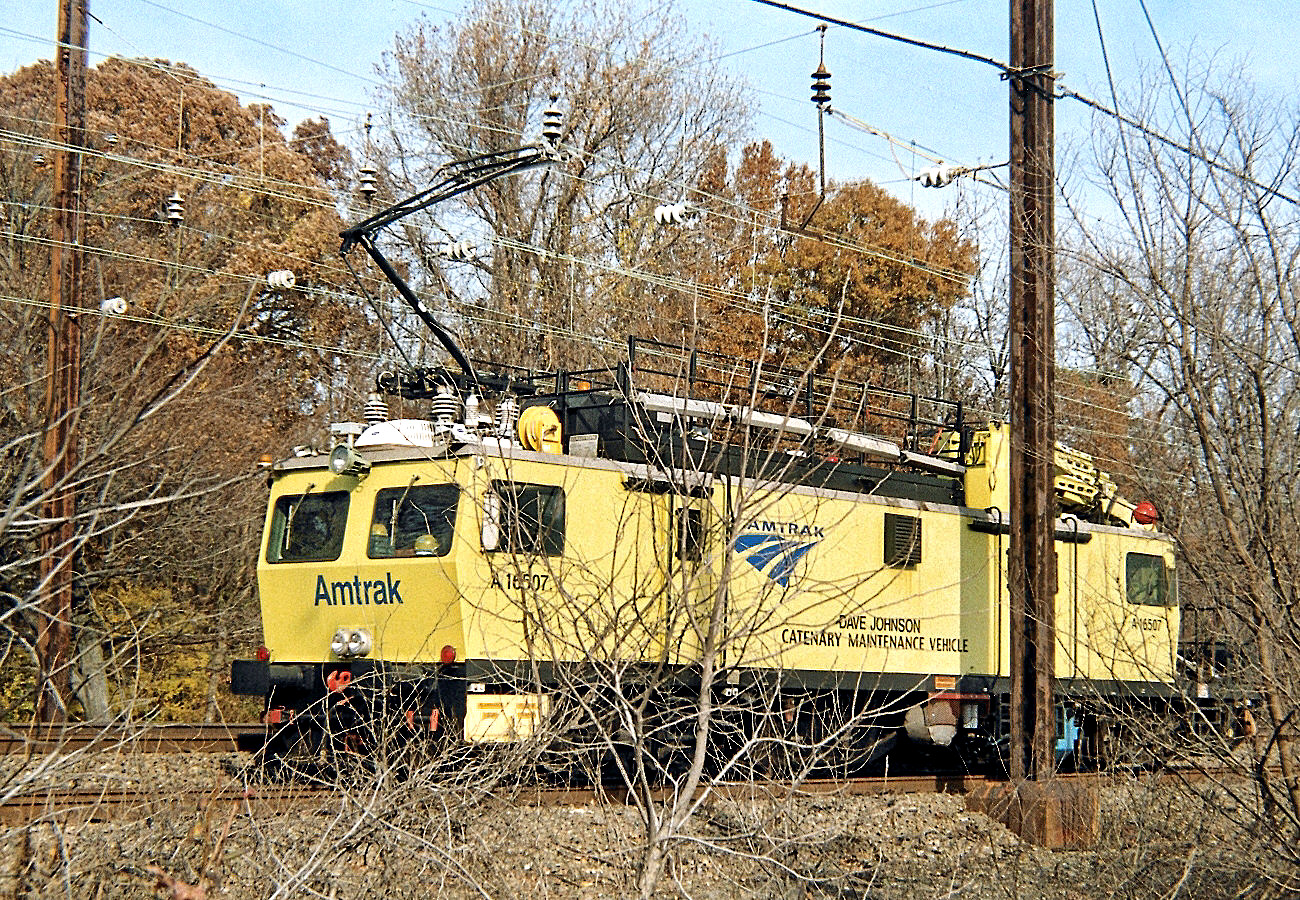
An Amtrak catenary maintenance vehicle in 2004-introduced lime paint

Beginning in 1976, Amtrak work train equipment was painted safety orange with black undersides. Light grey livery with a red bottom stripe, similar to Phase V non-passenger cars, was introduced for work train cars in 2004. Safety yellow livery was introduced for maintenance of way equipment and roadway vehicles in 2001; it was replaced with a pale lime around 2004, and a brighter lime around 2013. Non-revenue locomotives typically use variations of the Phase paint schemes to make them visually distinct from revenue locomotives while maintaining consistent styles.

In 1997, Amtrak bought 50 rebuilt 50-foot (15 m) boxcars to supplement its newly built 60-foot (18 m) Express Box Car fleet. The rebuilt cars arrived in their original Southern Pacific Olive Green paint scheme, rather than the Phase V scheme of the newer cars, though some were later repainted.

== Advertising ==
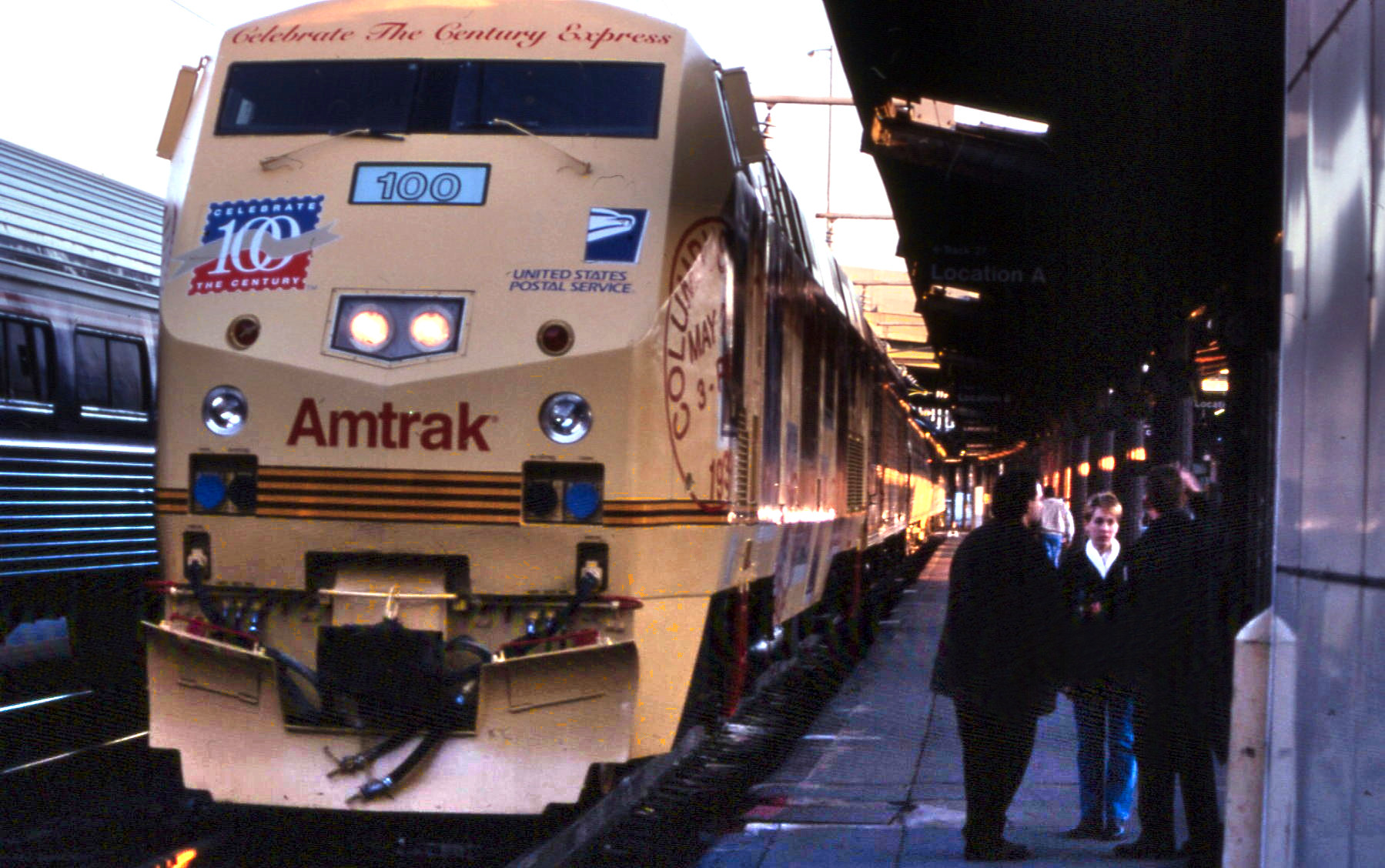
The Century Express at Union Station in Washington, D.C., in 1999

Since the late 1990s, Amtrak has occasionally rented advertising space on the exterior of its passenger equipment. The ads sometimes take the form of wraps rather than true paint schemes. Customers have included fast food restaurants, auto manufacturers, television networks, and politicians. In some cases, the advertisements were on equipment rented for private use, rather than on equipment in normal revenue service. Notable temporary advertisements have included:

- In 1999 and 2000, a four-car train including P42DC locomotive No. 100, a baggage car, a 1926 railway post office car, a business car, and an exhibit car was used for the United States Postal Service's "Celebrate the Century Express Educational Train Tour". The scheme consisted of an elaborate collection of enlarged stamps and postmarks from 1900 to the 1990s.
- In October 2003, P42DC No. 203 and five Amfleet cars were wrapped in a scheme featuring Monopoly game pieces and money. The train was used as the "Reading Railroad", a special train from Chicago to Atlantic City, New Jersey upon which the first rounds of the 2003 U.S. National Championship were held.
- In August 2004, presidential candidate John Kerry traveled on the "Kerry-Edwards Special", which used P42DC No. 138 wrapped with a "BELIEVE IN AMERICA TOUR" as the lead unit.
- In November and December 2007, a full Acela Express trainset was wrapped to promote The History Channel's show 1968 with Tom Brokaw. The wrap was criticized by passengers for impeding the view from inside the train. A similar wrap was used in 2010 to promote the TLC show Cake Boss.

== Test train schemes ==
Amtrak has tested a number of types of off-the-shelf equipment on the Northeast Corridor and short corridors. Some of these have been painted fully in Amtrak livery:

- Bombardier LRC cars received a variation of the Phase III scheme very similar to the RTL Turboliners.
- The Swedish Rc4 (numbered X995) and the French CC 21000 (X996), used for testing during the design of the AEM-7 locomotives in the late 1970s, used a Phase II scheme similar to the E60 locomotives the AEM-7 would replace. In 2025, it was again painted in the Amtrak scheme by a private operator in Sweden.

Other equipment largely retained their paint schemes from usage elsewhere:

- A Siemens ICE 1 trainset and a Kalmar Verkstad X2000 trainset were tested on the Northeast Corridor and several other routes in 1992 and 1993. The X2000 retained its Statens Järnvägar livery of silver with blue stripes, although it did receive Amtrak lettering; it was pulled by Amtrak diesels on non-electrified routes. The ICE 1 retained its Deutsche Bahn livery of white with a two-tone red stripe, again with Amtrak lettering. On non-electrified routes, it was pulled by two EMD F69PHAC diesel locomotives painted in the same red-on-white scheme.
- After non-revenue testing on the Northeast Corridor in 1988, a Talgo 200 trainset was tested in revenue service between Portland and Seattle in 1994 as the Northwest Talgo. The AVE paint scheme of white with a thick blue window stripe was modified with a thin Phase III red, white, and blue stripe below the windows.
- In 1996, two Adtranz IC3 "Flexliner" trainsets were tested on several Amtrak routes in California, as well as the Metrolink Antelope Valley Line. They retained their Israel Railways livery of white with red, black, and blue sections, with some Amtrak lettering added.
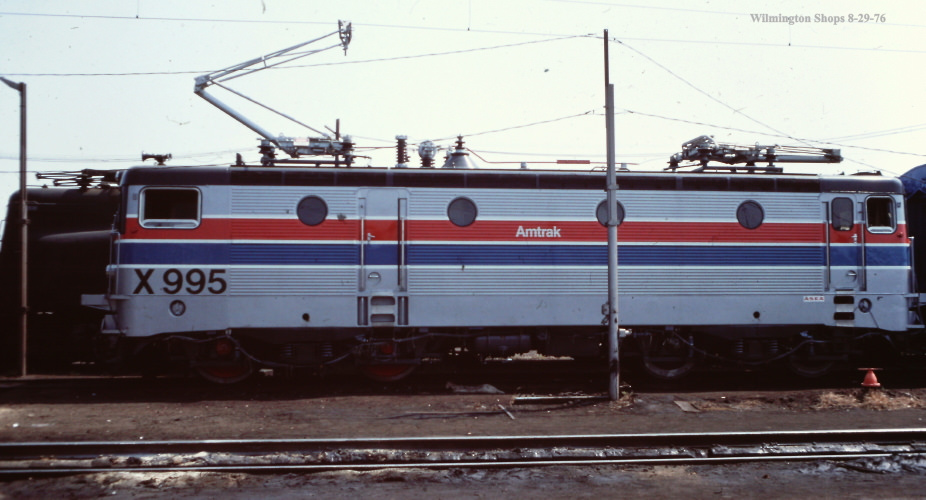
X995 in Phase II paint in 1976

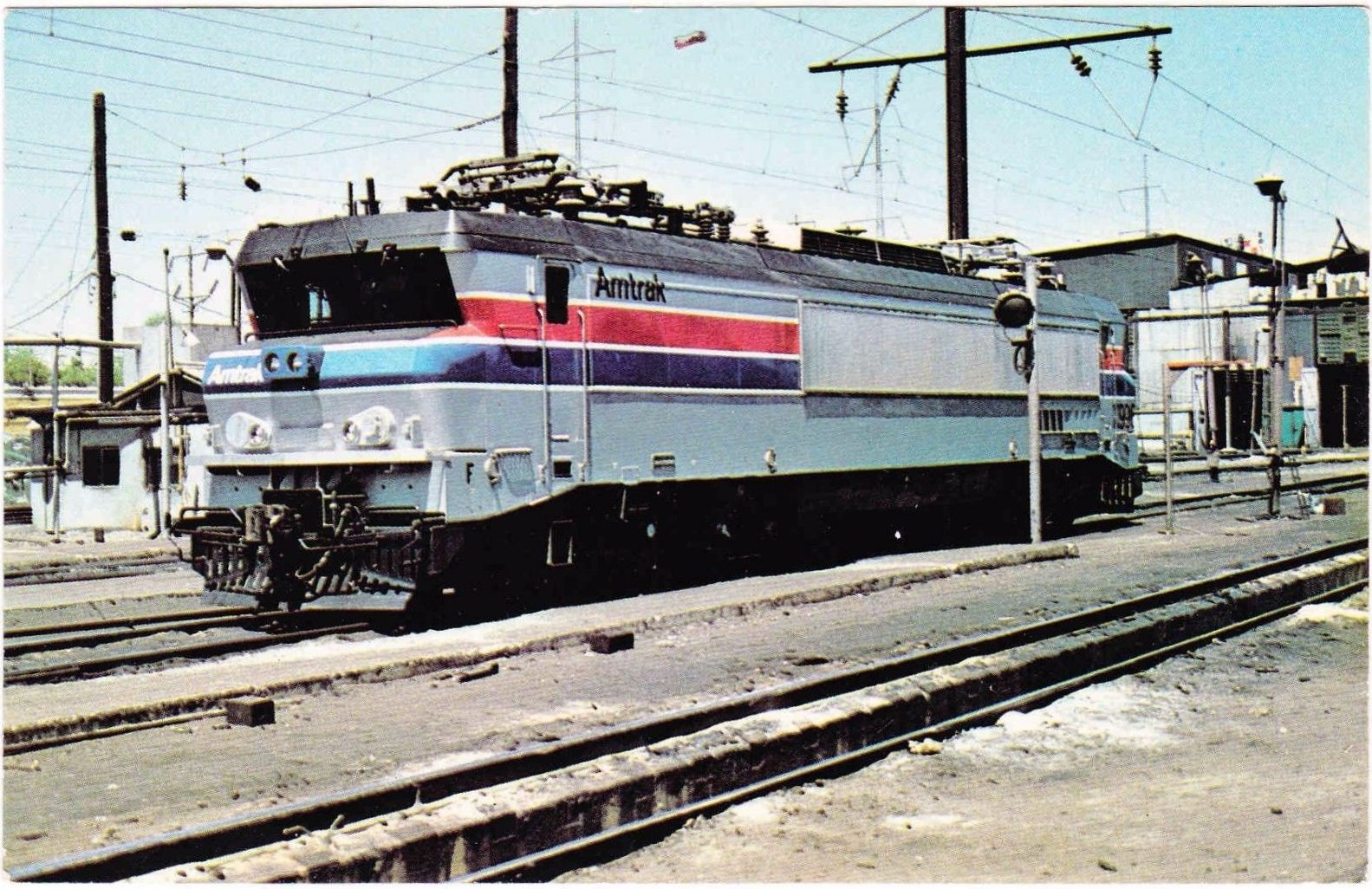
X996 in Phase II paint in 1977

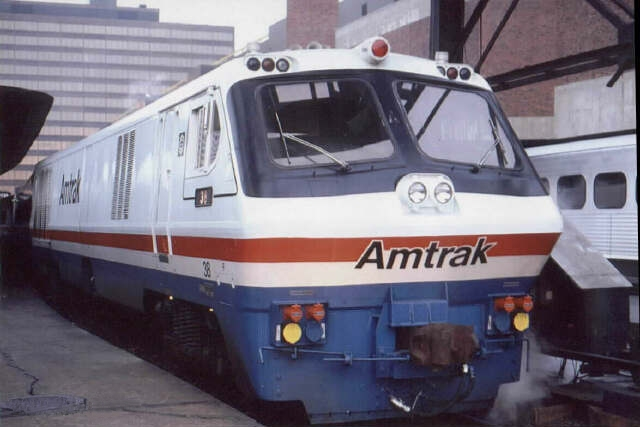
Bombardier LRC in Phase III variant in 1980

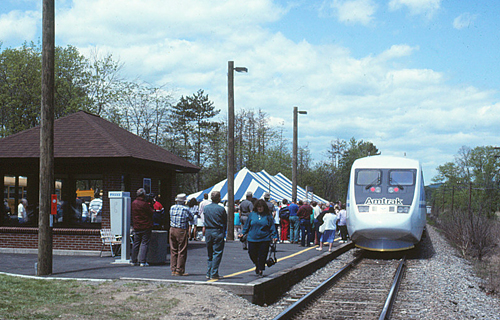
X2000 in Statens Järnvägar livery in 1993

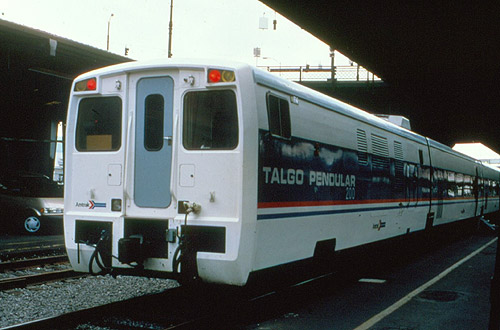
Talgo 200 in modified AVE paint scheme in 1994

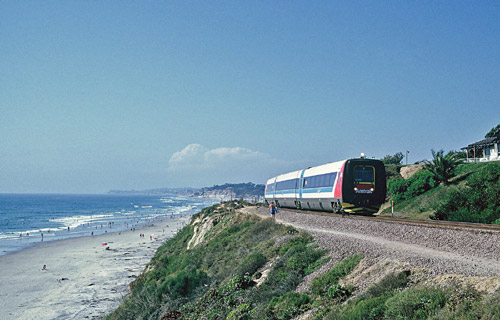
IC3 in Israel Railways livery in 1996
