= Pacific Surfliner =

Amtrak rail service between San Diego and San Luis Obispo

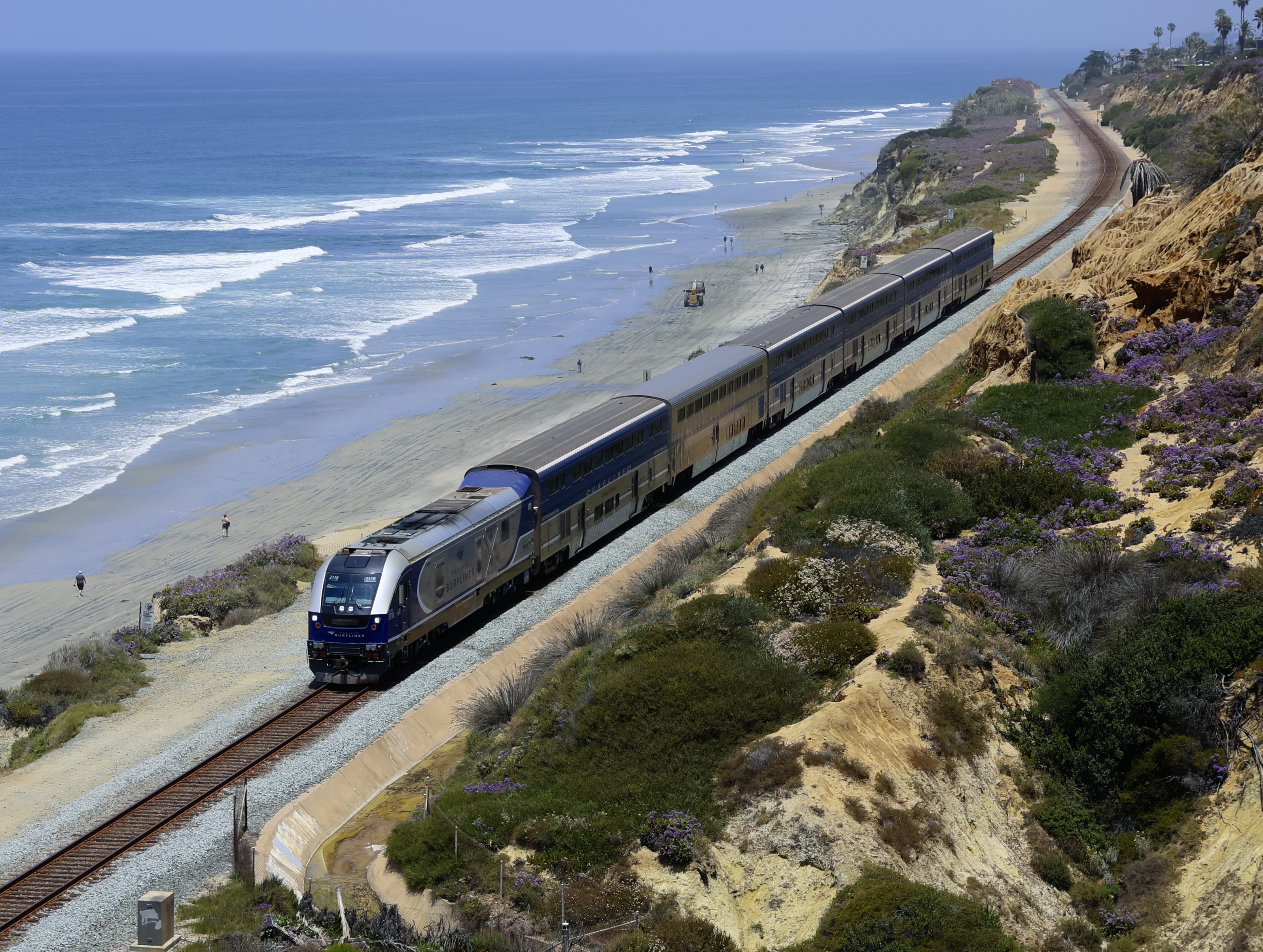
- A Pacific Surfliner train in Del Mar in 2024

Overview
- Service type: Inter-city rail, higher-speed rail
- Locale: Southern California
- Predecessor: San Diegan
- First service: June 1, 2000; 26 years ago
- Current operators: LOSSAN Rail Corridor Agency, in partnership with Amtrak, Caltrans and OCTA
- Annual ridership: 2,043,059 (FY 25) ▲3% (Note: Amtrak's Fiscal Year (FY) runs from October 1 of the prior year to September 30 of the named year.)
- Website: pacificsurfliner.com

Route
- Termini: San Luis Obispo; San Diego
- Stops: 25
- Distance travelled: 350 miles (560 km)
- Average journey time: 8 hours, 52 minutes
- Train number: 562–595, 757–794

On-board services
- Classes: Coach Class, Business Class
- Catering facilities: Café

Technical
- Rolling stock: Siemens Charger; Surfliner (railcar); Comet (railcar)
- Track gauge: 4 ft 8 1/2 in (1,435 mm) standard gauge
- Operating speed: 41 mph (66 km/h) (avg.); 90 mph (140 km/h) (top)
Route map
Pacific Surfliner highlighted in black
Key

The Pacific Surfliner is a 350-mile (560 km) passenger train service serving the communities on the coast of Southern California between San Diego and San Luis Obispo. The Pacific Surfliner is Amtrak's third-busiest service (exceeded in ridership only by the Northeast Regional and Acela), and the busiest outside the Northeast Corridor.

Like all regional trains in California, the Pacific Surfliner is operated by a joint powers authority. The LOSSAN Rail Corridor Agency is governed by a board that includes eleven elected representatives from the six counties the train travels through. LOSSAN contracts with the Orange County Transportation Authority to provide day-to-day management of the service and with contracts with Amtrak to operate the service and maintain the rolling stock (locomotives and passenger cars). Caltrans provides the funding to operate the service and also owns all of the locomotives and some of the rolling stock; with Amtrak owning the rest.

As of May 2026, the Pacific Surfliner operates thirteen daily round trips between Los Angeles and San Diego, six of which continue north of Los Angeles to Goleta or San Luis Obispo.

Portions of the line in southern Orange County have been suspended five times between 2022, 2024, and 2026 due to coastal erosion.

== Operations ==
Pacific Surfliner train 761 coasts through Price Canyon with CTDX 2119 at the lead

The 350-mile (563 km) San Luis Obispo–San Diego trip takes approximately 8 hours, 52 minutes at an average speed of 38.9 miles per hour (63 km/h); maximum track speed varies 79 to 90 miles per hour (127 to 145 km/h). Much of the Pacific Surfliner's scenic route follows the Pacific coast, with the tracks being less than 100 feet (30 m) from the ocean in some locations. Trains travel inland through expansive farmlands in Ventura County and industrial areas in the Los Angeles Basin, San Fernando Valley, and parts of Orange County.

Since May 2026, the Pacific Surfliner operates thirteen daily round trips between Los Angeles and San Diego. Six round trips extend north of Los Angeles: three provide direct service to San Luis Obispo, while three terminate at Goleta (near Santa Barbara), with Amtrak Thruway motorcoach service bridging the remaining segment to San Luis Obispo. Thruway motorcoach connections are also maintained for Palm Springs and Indio, and San Jose or Oakland via Paso Robles, providing transfers to Capitol Corridor services.

Because the stations at the ends of the line do not have wyes to turn equipment, trains are operated in push-pull mode: The locomotive is at the rear of the train, pushing the train from Goleta, San Luis Obispo or San Diego to Los Angeles. At Los Angeles, the train reverses travel direction at the station, and the locomotive pulls the train to San Diego or Goleta/San Luis Obispo, respectively. Run-through tracks are under construction at Los Angeles Union Station to ease congestion and reduce time spent waiting to enter or depart the station. The ongoing North Coast Corridor project plans to increase rail capacity on the route of the Surfliner in northern San Diego County.

=== LOSSAN Rail Corridor Agency ===
Local agencies along with the host railroads formed the Los Angeles–San Diego-San Luis Obispo Rail Corridor Agency (LOSSAN) in 1989. The Pacific Surfliner is operated by Amtrak under the Amtrak California brand with funding provided by Caltrans. Serious discussions were held in 2009 regarding the local agencies administering the service rather than Caltrans. California Senate Bill No. 1225, passed in 2014, allowed LOSSAN to amend the joint powers agreement and become the sponsor of state-supported intercity passenger rail service in the corridor. In mid-2015, LOSSAN assumed oversight for the Surfliner. They are also working with Caltrans to assess rail operations from Los Angeles to San Diego to develop better connections, close gaps in the schedule, and optimize the assets of the railroad.

== History ==
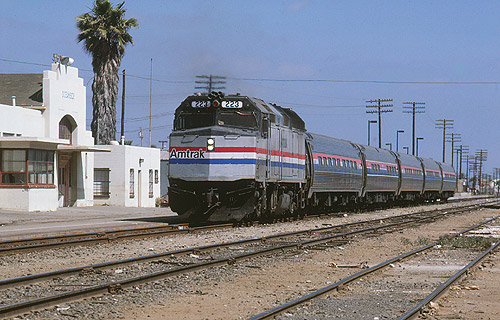
The San Diegan at Oceanside in 1985

The route is the successor of the San Diegan, a Los Angeles–San Diego service operated since 1938 by the Santa Fe Railway. It had been one of the Santa Fe's premier routes until Amtrak took over operations in 1971. Initially there were three daily trips, but the schedule was expanded to six round trips during the 1970s with funding from the state of California. In 1988 the service was extended to Santa Barbara to provide the Central Coast with an additional train to Los Angeles, followed in 1995 with one trip a day going all the way to San Luis Obispo. To better reflect the route's extent, it was renamed the Pacific Surfliner in 2000. The route is named after the Surf Line, which now comprises the route's busiest section from Los Angeles to San Diego.

On November 4, 2000, a northbound train hit a truck at a private level crossing along California State Route 118 near Moorpark, California and close to Somis, California, derailing the first three cars of the train. The truck driver was killed; the train engineer and 28 passengers were injured. On November 23, 2001, a northbound train hit a farm tractor at a private crossing near Camarillo, California. The tractor driver was killed and 12 passengers were injured.

A stop at Old Town Transit Center was added in 2004. Stops at Orange and Laguna Niguel/Mission Viejo were added in 2007 but dropped in 2012. On October 7, 2013, stops were added at Coaster stations at Carlsbad Village, Carlsbad Poinsettia, Encinitas and Sorrento Valley. The Carlsbad Poinsettia and Encinitas stops were dropped on October 9, 2017, due to low ridership. The Carlsbad Village and Sorrento Valley stops were dropped on October 8, 2018, due to changes with the cross-ticketing arrangement with Coaster. A 13th daily round trip was added on October 14, 2019.

On September 30, 2022, all rail service between Irvine and Oceanside was suspended due to coastal erosion under the track in San Clemente. Emergency repairs were expected to take at least 90 days. Full Pacific Surfliner service resumed on April 17, 2023. Service south of Irvine was again suspended on April 27 due to further erosion at Casa Romantica. Service resumed on May 27, 2023. Service was suspended again on June 5 due to continued erosion at Casa Romantica and resumed on July 19. Service was suspended on January 25, 2024, due to a landslide at San Clemente. The state declared an emergency on February 1, allowing the Orange County Transportation Authority to access emergency funding. Limited service through the landslide area resumed on March 6, 2024, followed by full service on March 25.

In January 2025, LOSSAN was awarded a $27 million federal grant, part of SB 125, to fund restoration of the 11th, 12th, and 13th daily round trips, resuming pre-pandemic frequency. The 11th round trip resumed on March 31, 2025, followed by the 12th on June 16. The 13th round trip resumed on January 26, 2026.

In May 2026, a third daily roundtrip between Los Angeles and San Luis Obispo was added to the schedule, increasing service to six daily trips to Goleta and three to San Luis Obispo.

In September 2026, high waves and surf heights caused by Hurricane Marie resulted in some of the ballast eroding into the ocean.

== Route ==
Map of Pacific Surfliner stations

The Pacific Surfliner runs on track owned by several private railroads and public agencies:

- Union Pacific Railroad (Coast Line): San Luis Obispo – Moorpark
- Southern California Regional Rail Authority: Moorpark – Los Angeles
- BNSF Railway: Los Angeles – Fullerton
- Southern California Regional Rail Authority: Fullerton – Orange County/San Diego County line
- North County Transit District: Orange County/San Diego County line – San Diego

== Stations ==
Entire route is located in the U.S. state of California.

Station	Municipality	mi (km)	Connections
San Luis Obispo	San Luis Obispo	0 (0)	Amtrak: Coast Starlight; Amtrak Thruway: 17, 18, 21; SLO Transit; FlixBus
Grover Beach	Grover Beach	12 (20)	Amtrak Thruway: 17, 18, 21; SLORTA
Guadalupe	Guadalupe	24 (39)	Guadalupe Flyer
Lompoc–Surf	Surf	51 (81)	
Goleta	Goleta	109 (176)	MTD Santa Barbara
Santa Barbara	Santa Barbara	119 (191)	Amtrak: Coast Starlight; Amtrak Thruway: 10, 17, 21; MTD Santa Barbara
Carpinteria	Carpinteria	129 (207)	Amtrak Thruway: 10; MTD Santa Barbara
Ventura	Ventura	145 (234)	Amtrak Thruway: 10
Oxnard	Oxnard	155 (250)	Amtrak: Coast Starlight; Metrolink: Ventura County; Amtrak Thruway: 10; Gold Coast Transit
Camarillo	Camarillo	164 (264)	Metrolink: Ventura County; VCTC Intercity
Moorpark	Moorpark	175 (282)	Metrolink: Ventura County; Moorpark City Transit, VCTC Intercity
Simi Valley	Simi Valley	186 (299)	Amtrak: Coast Starlight; Metrolink: Ventura County; Simi Valley Transit
Chatsworth	Los Angeles (Chatsworth)	193 (311)	Metrolink: Ventura County; Metro: G Line; City of Santa Clarita Transit, LADOT Commuter Express, Los Angeles Metro Bus
Northridge	Los Angeles (Northridge)		Limited service, not all trains stop at this station; Metrolink: Ventura County; LADOT DASH
Van Nuys	Los Angeles (Van Nuys)	203 (326)	Amtrak: Coast Starlight; Metrolink: Ventura County; Amtrak Thruway: 1C; LADOT DASH, Los Angeles Metro Bus
Hollywood Burbank Airport	Burbank	208 (335)	Amtrak: Coast Starlight; Metrolink: Ventura County; Amtrak Thruway: 1C; Los Angeles Metro Bus
Downtown Burbank	Burbank		Limited service, not all trains stop at this station; Metrolink: Antelope Valley Ventura County; Burbank Bus, City of Santa Clarita Transit, Glendale Beeline, Los Angeles Metro Bus
Glendale	Glendale	216 (348)	Metrolink: Antelope Valley Ventura County; Amtrak Thruway: 1; Glendale Beeline, Los Angeles Metro Bus; Greyhound
Los Angeles	Los Angeles (Downtown)	222 (357)	Amtrak: Coast Starlight, Southwest Chief, Sunset Limited/Texas Eagle; Metrolink: 91/Perris Valley Antelope Valley Orange County Riverside San Bernardino Ventura County; Metro: A Line, B Line, D Line, J Line; Amtrak Thruway: 1; FlyAway to LAX; Los Angeles Metro Bus, Antelope Valley Transit Authority, Big Blue Bus, City of Commerce Transit, City of Santa Clarita Transit, Dodger Stadium Express, LADOT Commuter Express, LADOT DASH, Torrance Transit; FlixBus
Fullerton	Fullerton	247 (398)	Amtrak: Southwest Chief; Metrolink: 91/Perris Valley Orange County; Amtrak Thruway: 1, 39; OC Bus
Anaheim	Anaheim	253 (407)	Metrolink: Orange County; Anaheim Resort Transportation, OC Bus; Flixbus
Santa Ana	Santa Ana	258 (415)	Metrolink: Inland Empire–Orange County Orange County; OC Bus; Greyhound
Irvine	Irvine	267 (430)	Metrolink: Inland Empire–Orange County Orange County; OC Bus
San Juan Capistrano	San Juan Capistrano	280 (450)	Metrolink: Inland Empire–Orange County Orange County; OC Bus
San Clemente Pier	San Clemente	287 (462)	Limited service, not all trains stop at this station; Metrolink: Inland Empire–Orange County Orange County; San Clemente Trolley
Oceanside	Oceanside	309 (497)	Coaster; Sprinter; Metrolink: Inland Empire–Orange County Orange County; Amtrak Thruway: 1; NCTD Breeze; Greyhound
Solana Beach	Solana Beach	324 (521)	Coaster; NCTD Breeze
San Diego–Old Town	San Diego	346 (557)	Coaster; San Diego Trolley: Blue Line, Green Line; Metropolitan Transit System, San Diego Flyer shuttle, University of San Diego shuttle; Flixbus
San Diego	San Diego	350 (563)	Coaster; San Diego Trolley: Blue Line, Green Line; Amtrak Thruway: 1; Metropolitan Transit System

Carlsbad Poinsettia, Carlsbad Village, Encinitas and Sorrento Valley stations were previously served under the "Rail 2 Rail" reciprocal pass program with Coaster, while Laguna Niguel/Mission Viejo and Orange were served under a similar program with Metrolink.

== Rolling stock ==
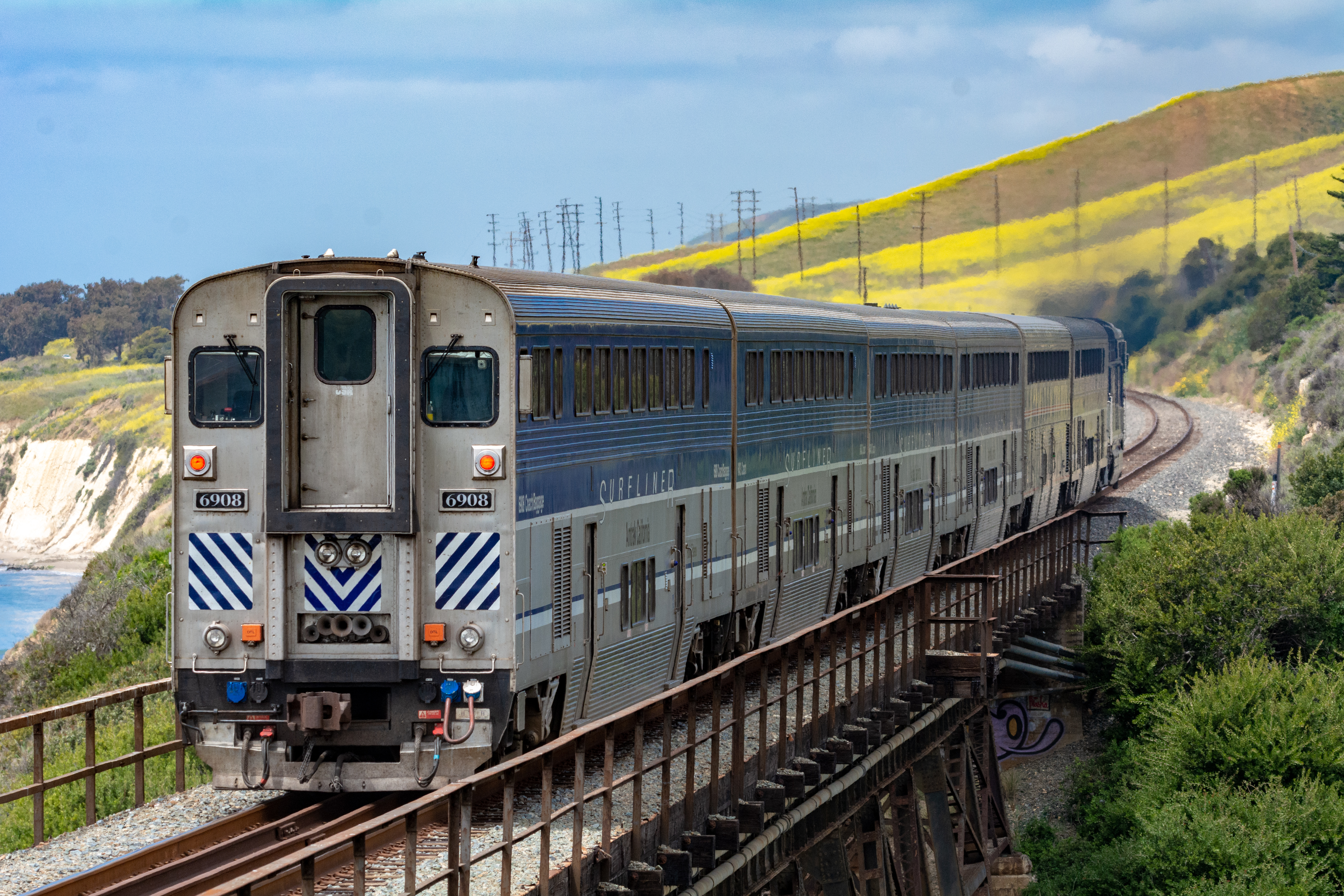
Coach/baggage/cab car #6908 on the Pacific Surfliner on the Gaviota Coast in 2018

The Pacific Surfliner uses push-pull trainsets with a diesel locomotive at one end and a cab car at the other. The COVID-19 pandemic saw a temporary reduction in service from ten trainsets operating 27 daily trains to seven trainsets operating 20 daily trains.

Trainsets used for regular service are composed from a fleet of 52 bi-level Surfliner coaches (39 owned by Amtrak and 13 by Caltrans), plus nine leased Amtrak Superliner long-distance coaches modified for push-pull operation. These Superliners are called flex cars, as they can be used for additional business class or coach seating, depending on the demand.

A typical six-car set has a business class car; one Superliner car; two coach cars; a coach/café car with food sales on the lower level; and a coach/baggage/cab car equipped with coach seating, a checked baggage space on the lower level, and engineer's operating cab.

LOSSAN has expressed interest in acquiring bi-level cars from a variety of sources, such as purchasing Surfliner and Superliner cars from Amtrak, as well as receiving bi-level cars from other Amtrak California services.

The Surfliner cars were introduced in 2000–02, and were designed specifically to handle the demands of the nation's third-busiest rail line. They replaced the California Cars which had been introduced on the San Diegan in 1996, and had been fraught with problems in the latter part of the 1990s.

A dedicated fleet of 16 Caltrans-owned Siemens Charger locomotives began entering service in late 2018. The Chargers replaced a fleet of 15 Amtrak-owned EMD F59PHI locomotives, which were sold to Metra in 2019.

The Surfliner cars and Charger locomotives (and previously the F59PHI locomotives) are painted in a blue and silver livery that is unique to the Pacific Surfliner.

Additional Amtrak-owned cars are added (up to 12-car consists) during periods of high demand, including San Diego Comic-Con, the San Diego County Fair, events at the Del Mar Racetrack, and after the 2018 Southern California mudflows closed Highway 101.

Additionally, in June 2024, seven Caltrans-owned Comet IB coaches, alongside two Non-Powered Control Units (former EMD F40PH locomotives rebuilt into cab-baggage cars) leased from Amtrak, entered service on the Pacific Surfliner. The Comets and the NPCUs were previously used on the San Joaquins until being displaced by Siemens Venture coaches. One NPCU was soon returned to the San Joaquins to allow an additional Venture trainset to enter service. However, the other NPCU and the Comets continue to serve the Pacific Surfliner, hauled by a GE P42DC or B32-8WH locomotive.

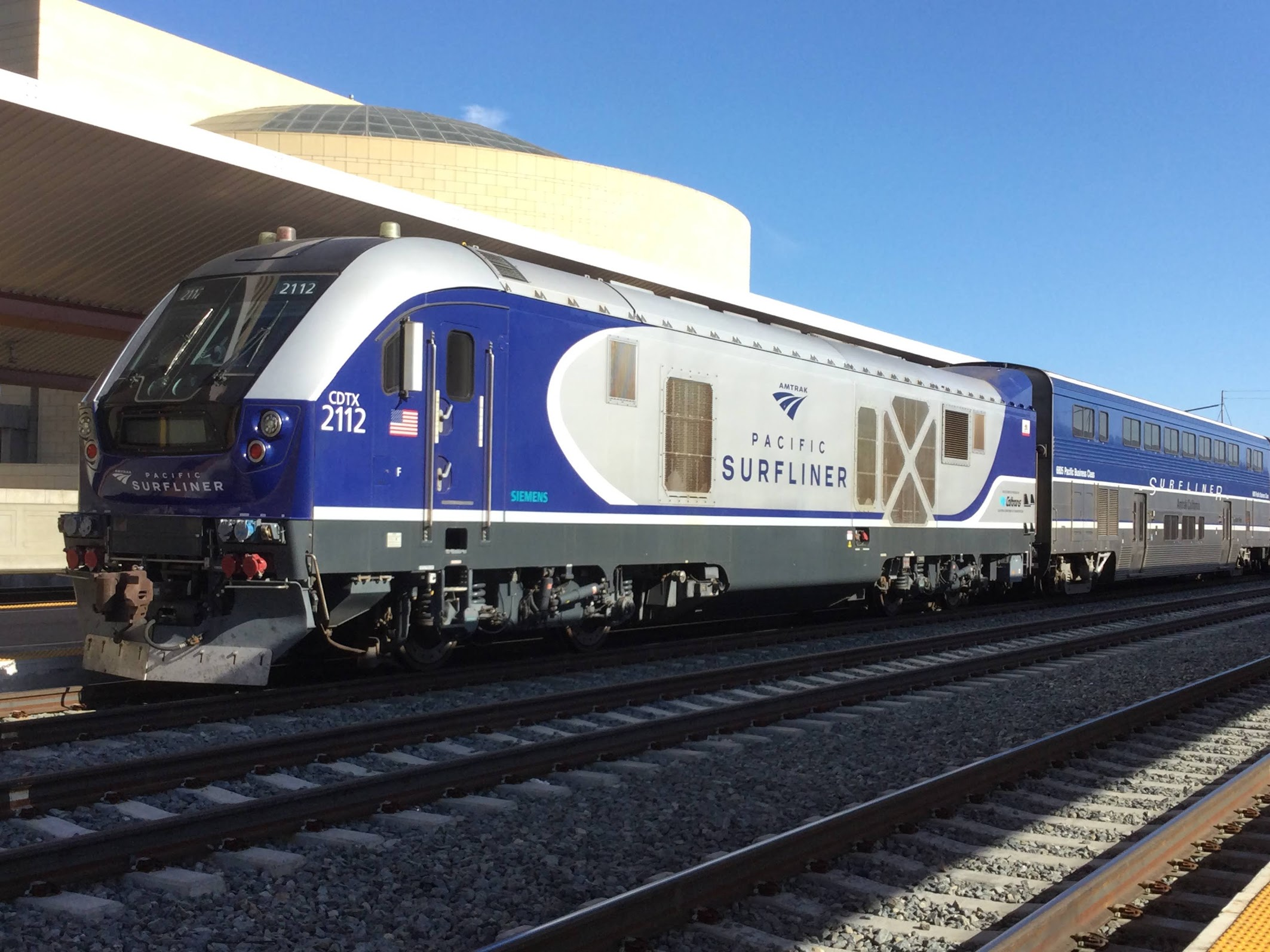
A Pacific Surfliner Siemens Charger locomotive at L.A. Union Station in 2022.

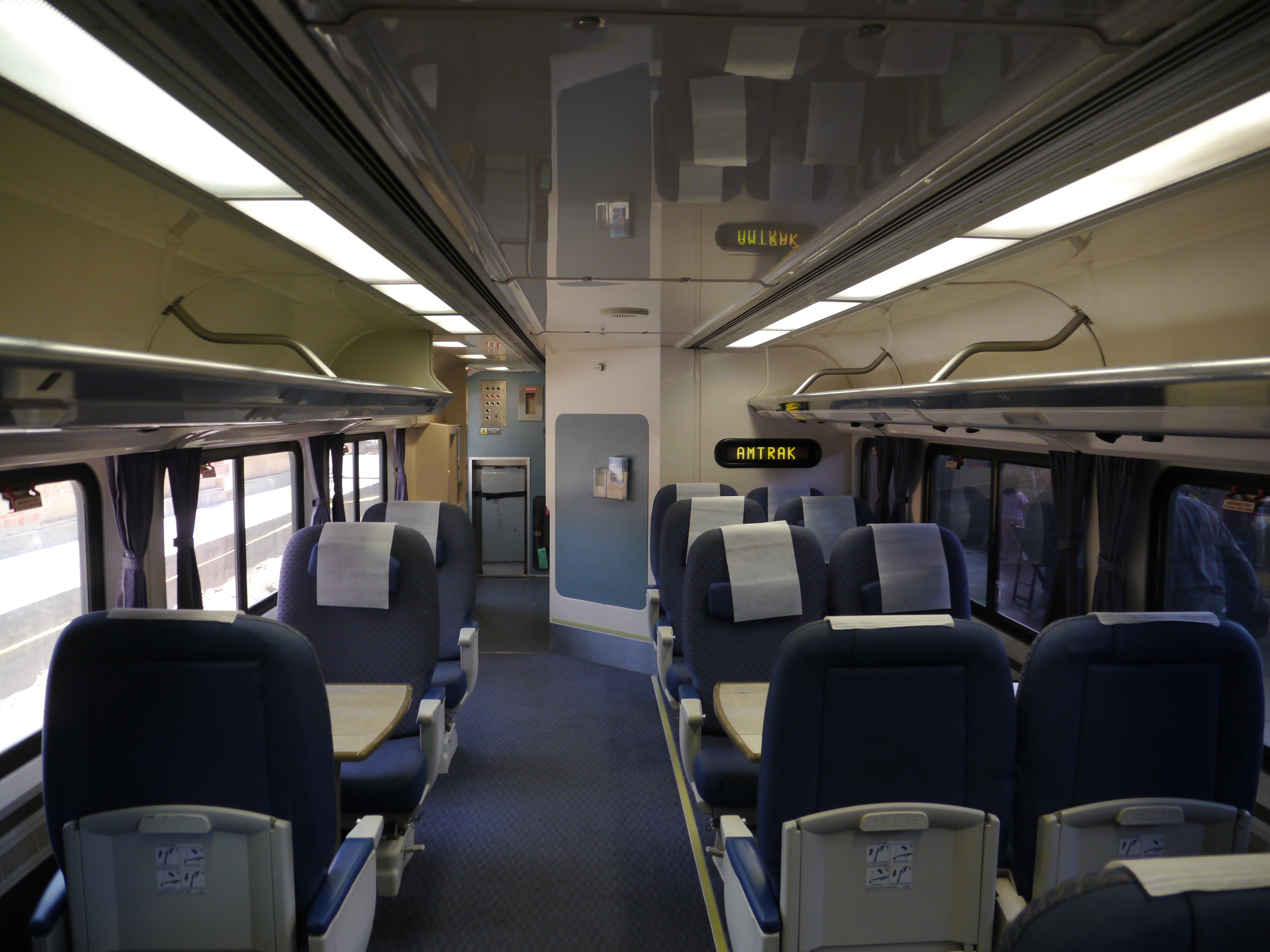
Lower-level seating on a "Pacific Business Class" car in 2012

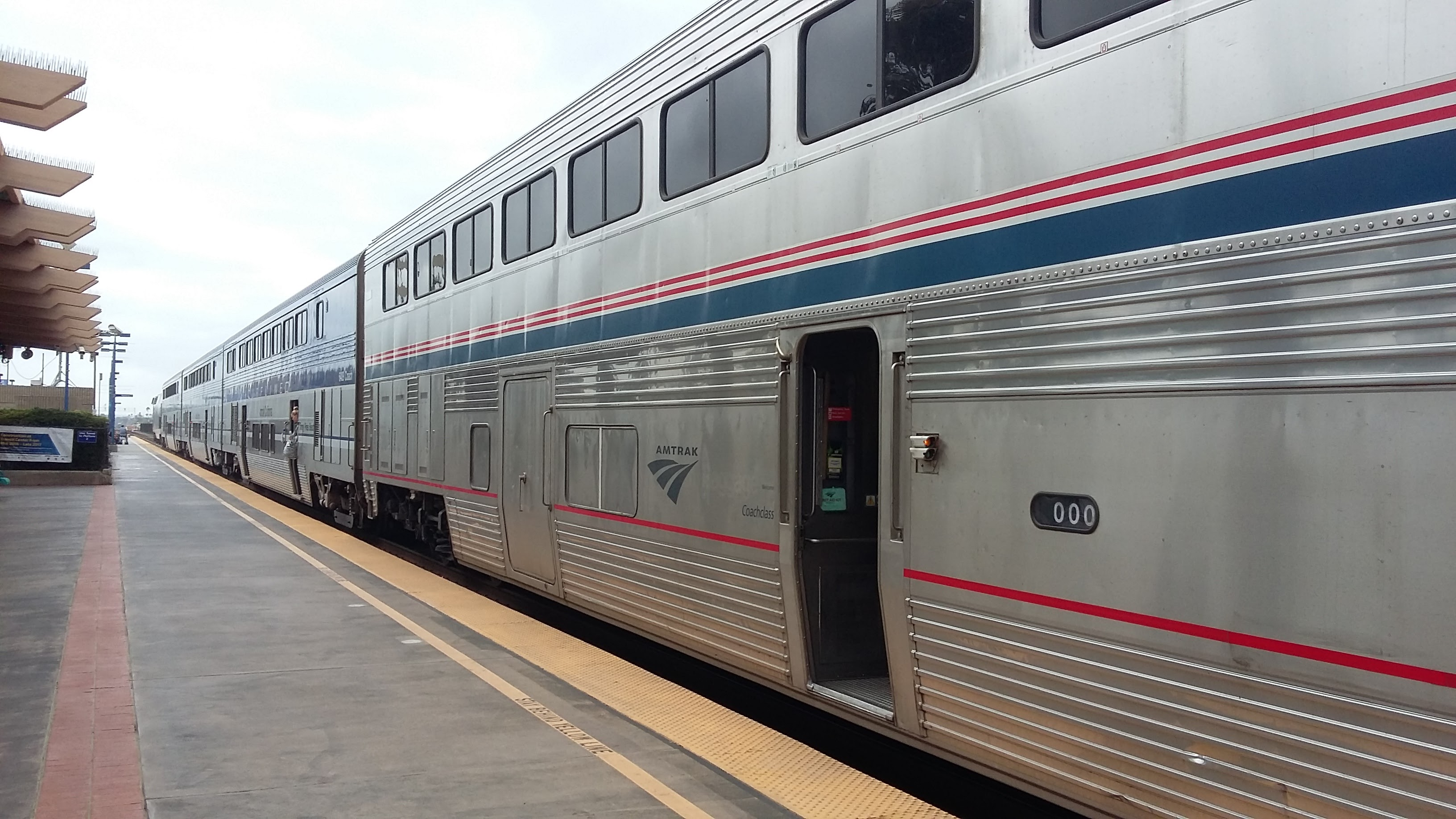
A Superliner car used in 2016

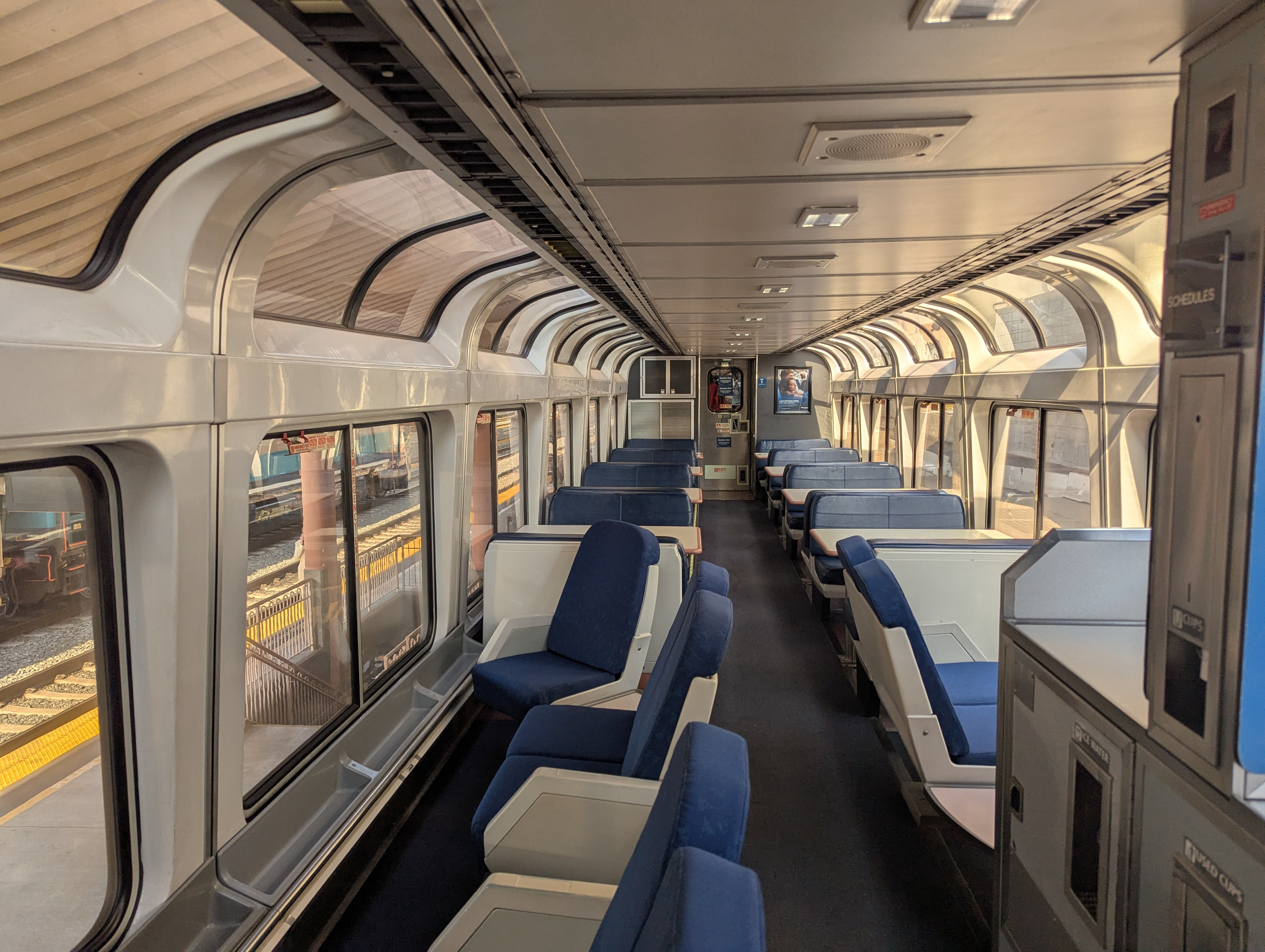
Interior of the lounge car in 2025
