= Santa Barbara station =

Train station in California

Santa Barbara, CA
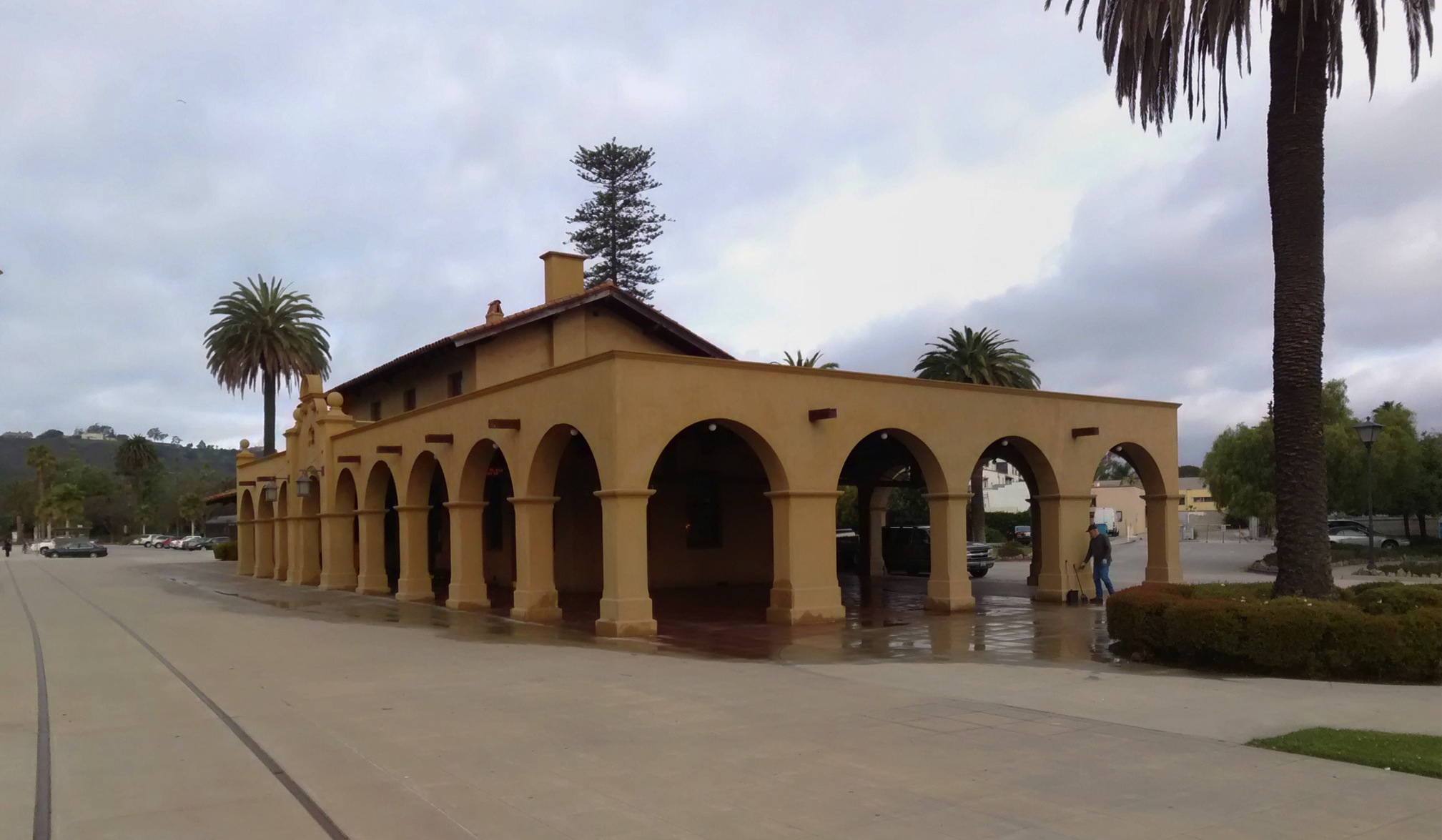
- Santa Barbara station in 2014

General information
- Location: 209 State Street; Santa Barbara, California; United States
- Coordinates: 34°24′49″N 119°41′33″W
- Owner: Redevelopment Agency of the City of Santa Barbara
- Line: UP Santa Barbara Subdivision
- Platforms: 1 side platform, 1 island platform
- Tracks: 2
- Connections: Amtrak Thruway: 10, 17, 21; Santa Barbara MTD: Downtown Shuttle; FlixBus; Greyhound

Construction
- Parking: Yes
- Accessible: Yes

Other information
- Status: Staffed, station building with waiting room
- Station code: Amtrak: SBA

History
- Opened: 1902
- Rebuilt: 2000
- Original company: Southern Pacific

Passengers
- FY 2025: 339,569 (Amtrak)

Services
Preceding station	Amtrak	Following station
San Luis Obispo toward Seattle	Coast Starlight	Oxnard toward Los Angeles
Goleta toward San Luis Obispo	Pacific Surfliner	Carpinteria toward San Diego
Former services
Preceding station	Amtrak	Following station
San Luis Obispo toward Sacramento	Spirit of California	Oxnard toward Los Angeles
Preceding station	Southern Pacific Railroad	Following station
Samarkand toward San Francisco	Coast Line	Summerland toward Los Angeles
- Southern Pacific Train Depot
- U.S. National Register of Historic Places
- Area: 4 acres (1.6 ha)
- Built: 1905
- Architect: Francis W. Wilson
- Architectural style: Mission/Spanish Revival
- NRHP reference No.: 06000658
- Added to NRHP: August 2, 2006
Location

Santa Barbara station is a passenger rail station in Santa Barbara, California, served by two Amtrak lines, the Coast Starlight and the Pacific Surfliner. The station is fully staffed with ticketing and checked baggage services.

Santa Barbara station is served by 10 Amtrak Pacific Surfliner trains (5 in each direction) evenly spaced throughout the day.

In fiscal year 2025, 339,569 passengers boarded or detrained at Santa Barbara station.

== History ==
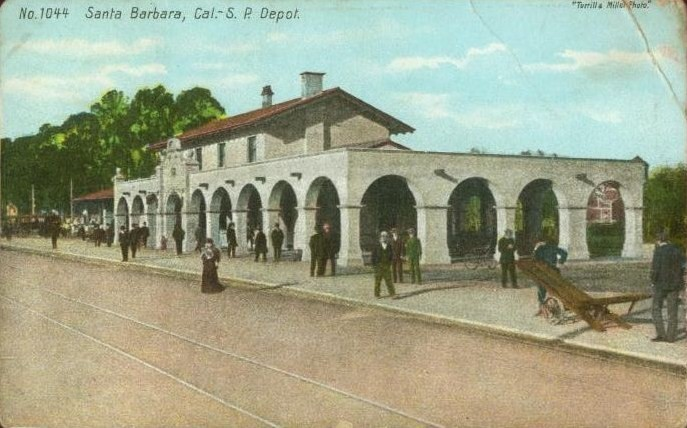
Santa Barbara station in a 1910 postcard

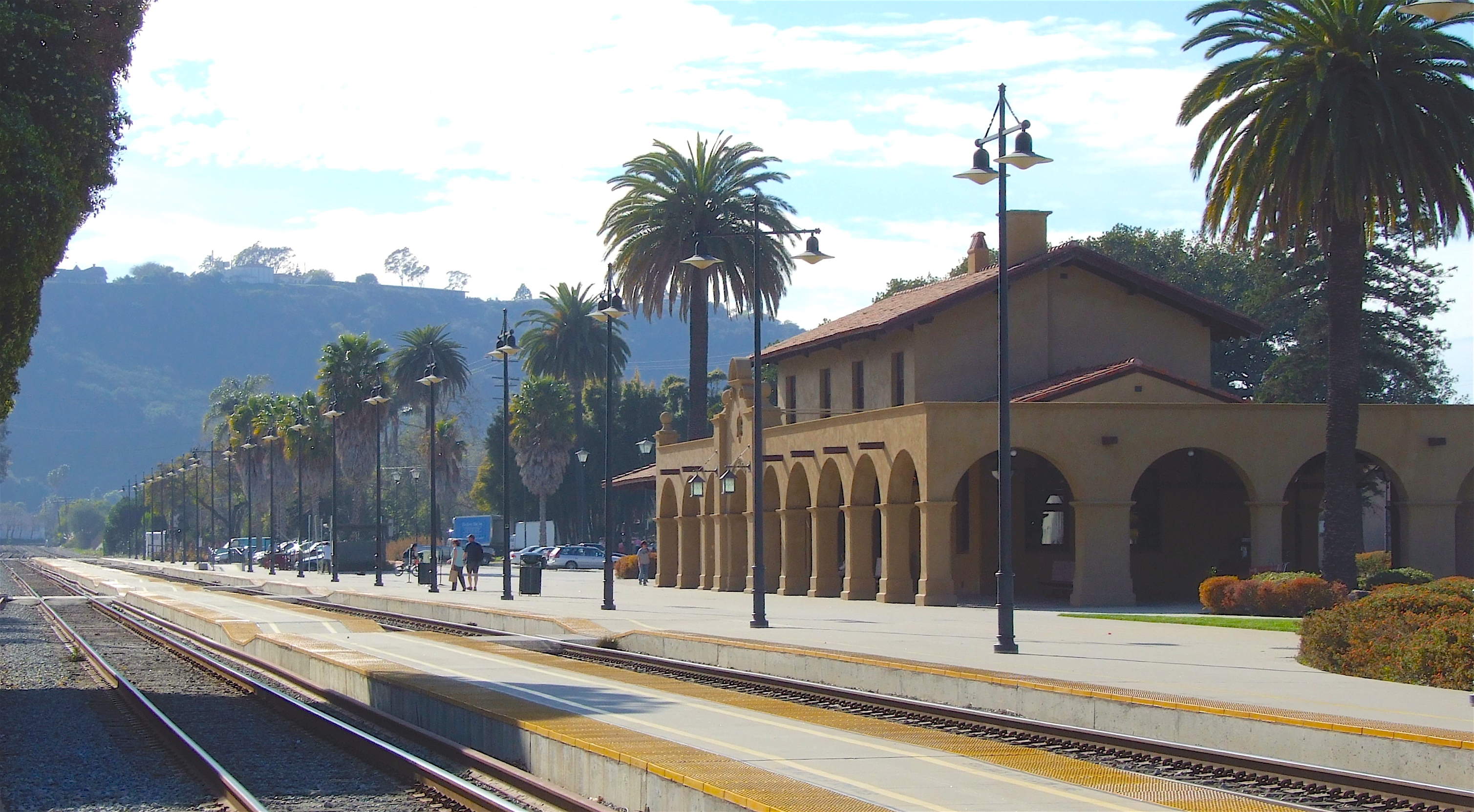
The station in 2007 after renovation in 2000

The station was built in 1902 by the Southern Pacific Railroad in the Spanish Mission Revival Style. Design work was by Santa Barbara architect Francis W. Wilson. It is located within walking distance of Santa Barbara Harbor, Stearns Wharf and State Street, Santa Barbara's main thoroughfare. The historic depot was renovated in 2000; the project included the restoration of the ticket office and upgrades to the plumbing, electrical and heating and cooling systems.

For most of the first decade of the Amtrak era, the station was only served by the Coast Starlight, which ran southbound during the evening rush and northbound at lunchtime. In 1988, Amtrak and Caltrans extended the San Diegan, previously a Los Angeles-San Diego service, to Santa Barbara, providing an additional round trip between the Central Coast and Los Angeles. Eventually, service was extended to nearby Goleta and later all the way to San Luis Obispo, resulting in the route being rebranded as the Pacific Surfliner in 2000.

Due to the length of the platform, when Amtrak's Coast Starlight train is stopped, it blocks the two streets to the north and south of the depot.

The station was placed on the National Register of Historic Places on August 2, 2006.
