= Carpinteria station =

Railway station in Carpinteria, California

Carpinteria, CA
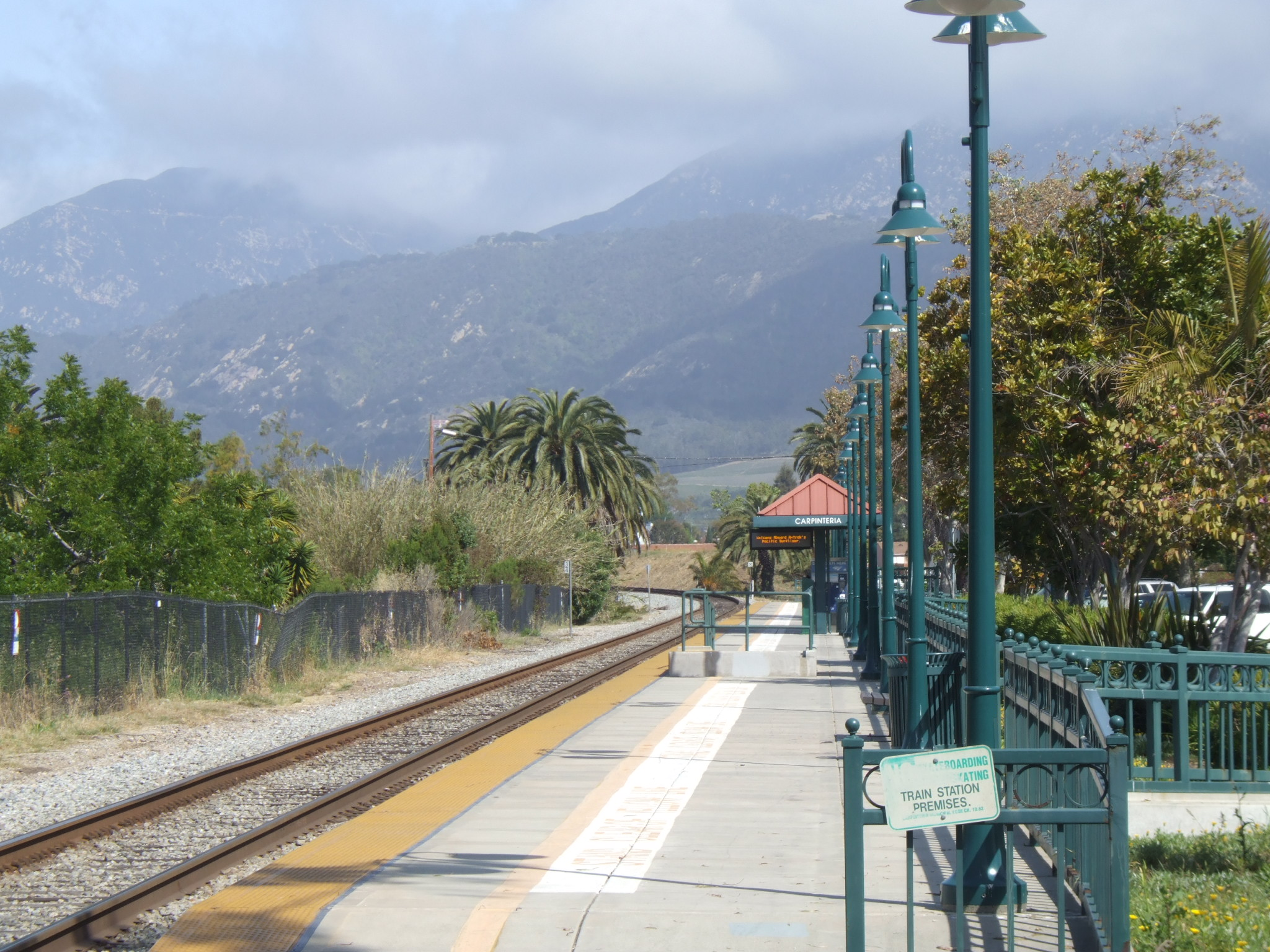
- Looking northwest along the station platform in 2010

General information
- Location: 475 Linden Avenue; Carpinteria, California; United States
- Coordinates: 34°23′46″N 119°31′21″W
- Owner: City of Carpenteria, Union Pacific Railroad
- Line: UP Santa Barbara Subdivision
- Platforms: 1 side platform
- Tracks: 1
- Connections: Amtrak Thruway: 10; MTD: Seaside Shuttle

Construction
- Parking: Yes
- Accessible: Yes

Other information
- Status: Unstaffed, platform with shelters
- Station code: Amtrak: CPN

History
- Opened: June 22, 1997

Passengers
- FY 2025: 27,105 (Amtrak)

Services
| Preceding station | Amtrak | Following station |
|---|---|---|
| Santa Barbara toward San Luis Obispo | Pacific Surfliner | Ventura toward San Diego |
Coast Starlight does not stop here
Former services
| Preceding station | Southern Pacific Railroad | Following station |
|---|---|---|
| Sandyland toward San Francisco | Coast Line | La Conchita toward Los Angeles |
Location

Carpinteria station is a passenger rail station in the city of Carpinteria, California. Opened on June 22, 1997, it is served by Amtrak's Pacific Surfliner from San Luis Obispo to San Diego. The station has a concrete platform and an open-air shelter.

Carpinteria station is served by 10 Amtrak Pacific Surfliner trains (5 in each direction) evenly spaced throughout the day.

In fiscal year 2025, 27,105 passengers boarded or detrained at Carpinteria station.
