= Carpinteria Unified School District =

School district in California

Address
- 1400 Linden Avenue Carpinteria, California, 93013; United States

District information
- Type: Public
- Grades: K–12
- NCES District ID: 0607560

Students and staff
- Students: 2,091 (2020–2021)
- Teachers: 109.44 (FTE)
- Staff: 138.29 (FTE)
- Student–teacher ratio: 19.11:1

Other information
- Website: www.cusd.net

The Carpinteria Unified School District (CUSD) is a public school district that provides services to students in the Carpinteria Valley, with district boundaries reaching south to the Ventura County line and north to the community of Summerland, California. The district, serving approximately 2800 students in grades K-12, has seven schools – one comprehensive high school, one alternative high school, one middle school, and four elementary schools. Six of the seven schools are located within the Carpinteria city limits; one elementary school is located in Summerland.

As of the 2008/2009 school year, the district included:

- Aliso Elementary School
- Canalino Elementary School
- Carpinteria Family School
- Summerland School
- Carpinteria Middle School
- Carpinteria High School
- Rincon High School
