= Procore =

Construction software company

Procore Technologies, Inc.
- Type: Public company
- Traded as: NYSE: PCOR; Russell 1000 component
- Industry: Construction Software
- Founded: 2002; 24 years ago
- Founder: Craig "Tooey" Courtemanche
- Headquarters: Carpinteria, California, U.S.
- Key people: Craig "Tooey" Courtemanche (Chairman of the Board); Ajei Gopal (President and CEO); Steve Davis (President, Product and Technology)
- Revenue: ▲US$1.32 billion (2025)
- Operating income: ▲US$−124 million (2025)
- Net income: ▲US$−101 million (2025)
- Total assets: ▲US$2.24 billion (2025)
- Total equity: ▼US$1.26 billion (2025)
- Number of employees: 4,000+ (2024)
- Website: www.procore.com

Procore Technologies is an American construction management software as a service company founded in 2002, with headquarters in Carpinteria, California. Procore hosts a platform to connect those involved in the construction industry on a global platform. The software allows for the creation of simplified workflows and displays a consolidated view of construction products that includes the tracking of tasks, management of project workflows, and scheduling.

== History ==
Founder and CEO Craig "Tooey" Courtemanche started his career as a carpenter and served as a real estate developer, before starting a tech company in Silicon Valley. When building his home in Santa Barbara, Tooey realized that he could apply his technology background in the field of construction. The app he built served to better manage the construction process. Founded in 2002, the company was originally headquartered in Carpinteria, California. Steve Zahm, founder of the e-learning company DigitalThink, joined Procore as president in 2004.

Procore's revenue in 2012 was $4.8 million. In 2020, it was $400 million. The estimated revenue for 2024 is $1 billion.

The company initially filed to go public in 2019, with plans to launch the IPO in 2020, but delayed the offering due to the coronavirus pandemic. Procore stock began trading under stock ticker PCOR on May 20, 2021 at $67 per share. The initial public offering raised $634.5 million. Following the IPO, the company was valued at nearly $11 billion. As of May 2021, the company has over 10,000 customers, and over 2 million users of its products in more than 150 countries.

Procore's main campus is on a 9-acre oceanfront property in Carpinteria, California. As of 2023, Procore had ten offices around the globe, including those in North America, Asia and Europe. The company has around 4,000 employees.

== Investors and acquisitions ==
In 2014, Bessemer Venture Partners led a $15 million investment round. In 2015, the company raised an additional $30 million in a round led by Bessemer and Iconiq Capital. In 2015, the Wall Street Journal reported the company to be worth "$500 million post-money." In 2016, the company raised $50 million in a round led by Iconiq, reaching a $1 billion valuation. In 2018, the company raised an additional $75 million, and in 2020, it raised over $150 million. In total, the company raised nearly $500 million from 2007 through its IPO in 2021.

In July 2019, Procore acquired US project management software group Honest Buildings. In October 2020, it acquired US estimating software provider Esticom. Procore acquired construction artificial intelligence companies Avata Intelligence in 2020, and INDUS.AI in 2021.

== Software ==
Procore provides end-to-end construction management software for owners, general contractors, and specialty contractors. It has a unified platform with solutions for various phases of work—including preconstruction, project management, workforce management, and financial management—as well as analytics. Procore also connects to third-party integrations through its App Marketplace.

Procore uses AI in its platform. Two of the ways Procore is using AI are through Procore Copilot and Agents. Copilot is a generative AI tool that allows users to retrieve information from and summarize project documents. Procore Agents streamlines processes such as managing RFIs, scheduling, and submittals to automate tasks and reduce manual data entry. These AI tools support workflows across the full project lifecycle.

== Philanthropy ==
Through Procore.org, the company has partnered with Habitat for Humanity and provides the Christian NGO "with unlimited use of Procore’s suite of products, including Project Management, Quality & Safety and Construction Financials as an in-kind donation."

Procore.org has donated software to schools, in addition to helping women who are interested in the field of technology as it relates to construction.

In September 2024, Procore sponsored the PGA Tour event in Napa.
