= Carpinteria, California =

City in California, United States

- City
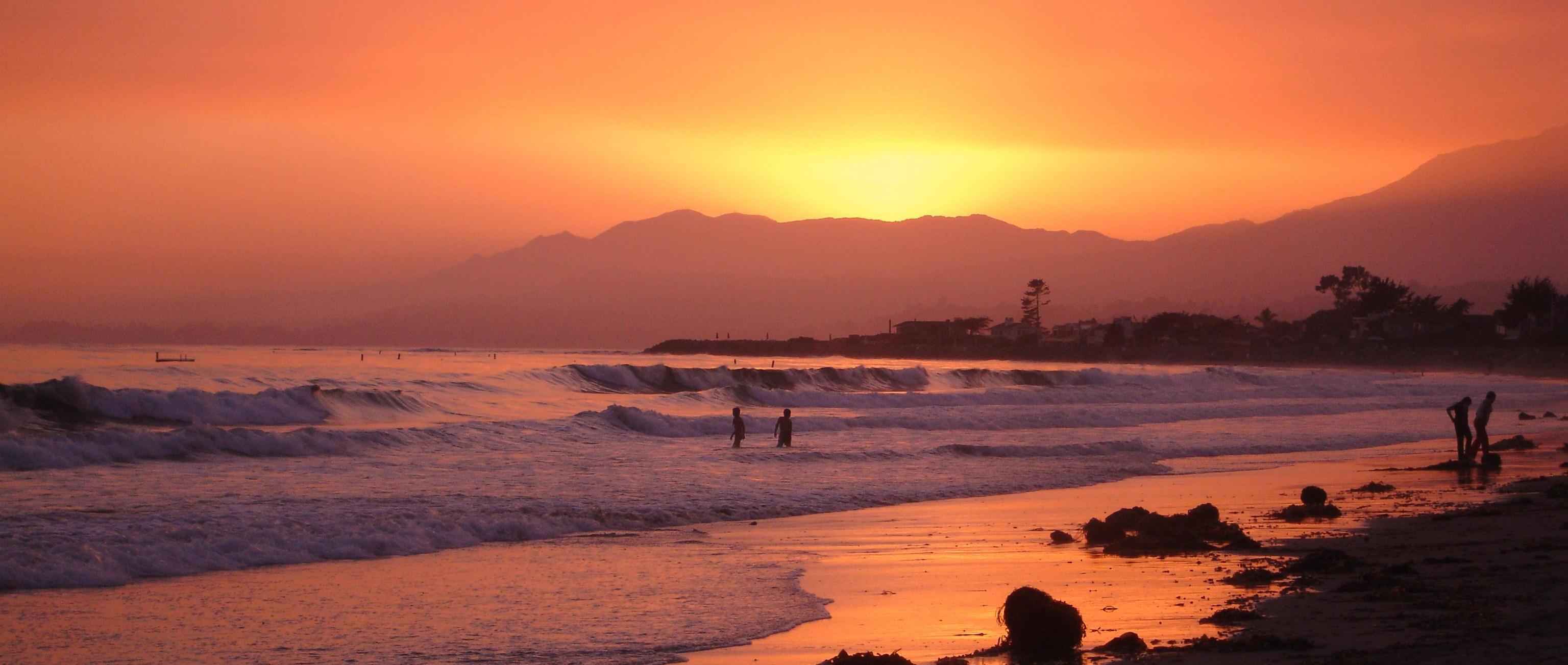
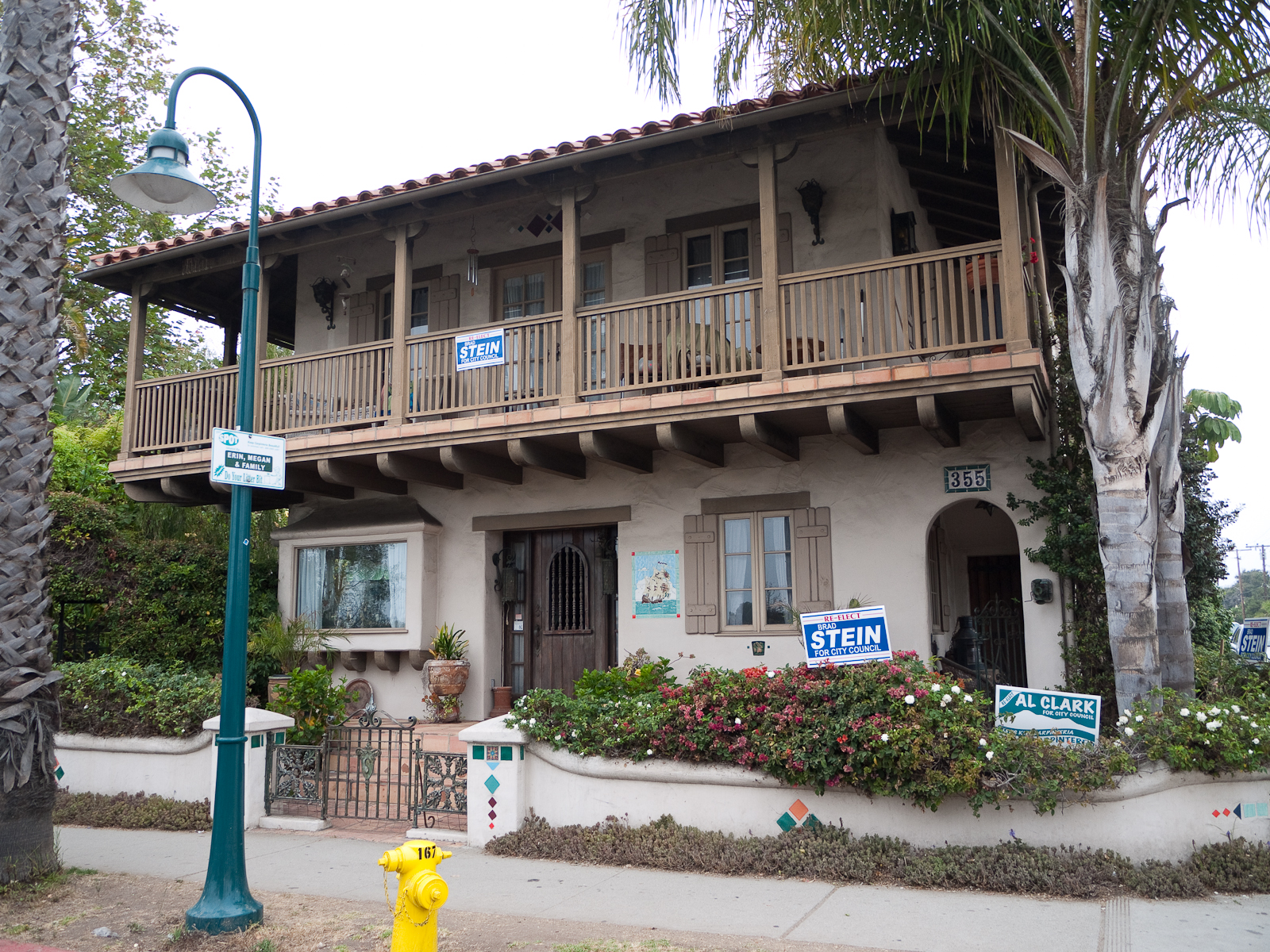
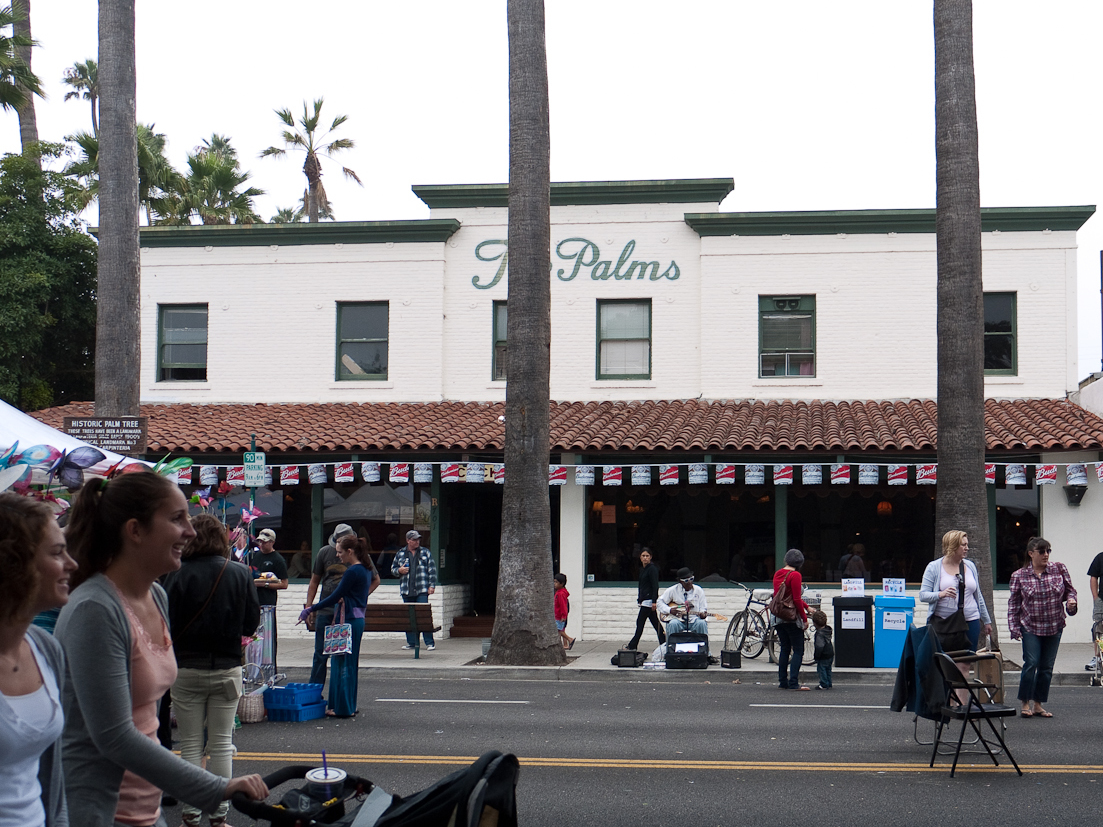
- Top: Carpinteria State Beach; bottom: downtown.

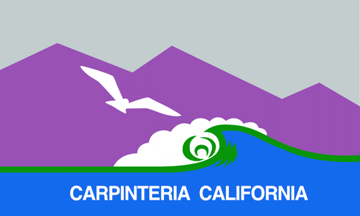
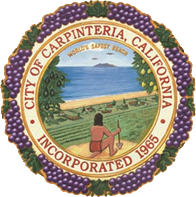
- Flag Seal
- Interactive map of Carpinteria, California
- Location in the United States
- Coordinates: 34°23′57″N 119°30′59″W
- Country: United States
- State: California
- County: Santa Barbara
- Incorporated: September 28, 1965
- Named for: The carpentry shops in the former Chumash settlement of Mishopshno ("Correspondence")

Government
  - Mayor: Natalia Alarcon
  - State senator: Monique Limón (D)
  - Assemblymember: Gregg Hart (D)
  - U. S. rep.: Salud Carbajal (D)

Area
  - Total: 9.27 sq mi (24.02 km^{2})
  - Land: 2.59 sq mi (6.70 km^{2})
  - Water: 6.68 sq mi (17.31 km^{2}) 72.09%
- Elevation: 33 ft (10 m)

Population (2020)
  - Total: 13,264
  - Density: 5,124.3/sq mi (1,978.51/km^{2})
- Time zone: UTC-8 (Pacific)
  - Summer (DST): UTC-7 (PDT)
- ZIP codes: 93013-93014
- Area code: 805
- FIPS code: 06-11446
- GNIS feature IDs: 1652684, 2409990
- GATV: Channel 18
- Website: www.carpinteriaca.gov

Carpinteria (/kɑːrpɪntəˈriːə/; Spanish: Carpintería, meaning "Carpentry") is a small seaside city in southeastern Santa Barbara County, California, United States. Located on the Central Coast of California, it had a population of 13,264 at the 2020 census. Carpinteria is a popular surf destination; the city embraced the slogan "World's Safest Beach" in 1912, which it still uses today.

== History ==
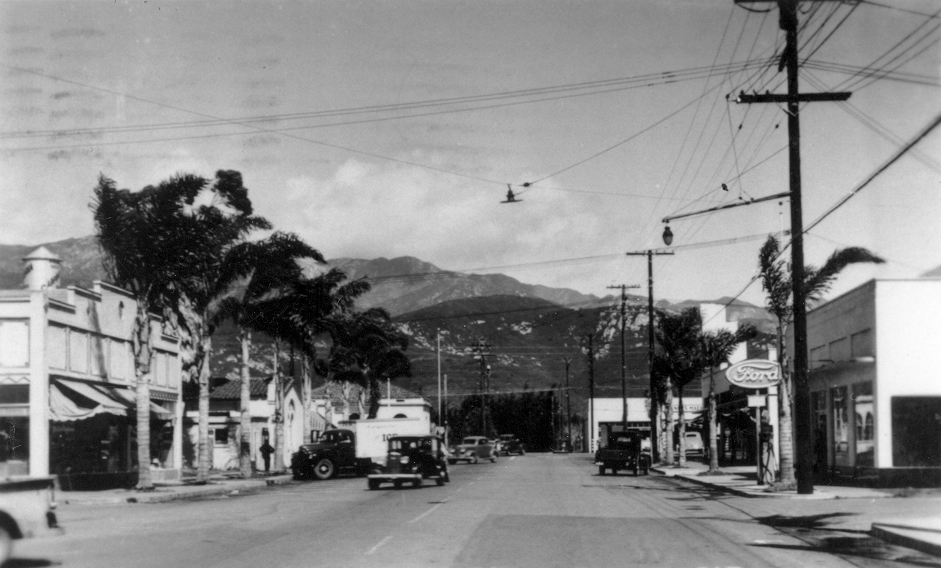
Downtown Carpinteria, c. 1950s.

Carpinteria was home to a Chumash village during pre-colonial times, which was known as Šujtu.

In 1769, the Spanish Portolá expedition came west along the beach from the previous night's encampment at Rincon. The explorers found a large native village on the point of land where Carpinteria Pier is today. The party camped nearby on August 17. Fray Juan Crespí, a Franciscan missionary travelling with the expedition, noted that "Not far from the town we saw some springs of pitch. The Indians have many canoes, and at the time were building one, for which reason the soldiers named this town La Carpinteria" (the carpentry shop).

The Chumash people used the naturally occurring surface asphalt to seal their canoes, known as Tomols. Petroleum seeps are still visible along the beach bluffs at Tar Pits Park on the campground beach of Carpinteria State Beach. The three closest drilling platforms visible from the shore are within the Carpinteria Offshore Oil Field, the 50th-largest field in California.

On March 21, 2023, an EF0 tornado impacted a mobile home park in Carpinteria, damaging 25 mobile homes.

== Geography ==
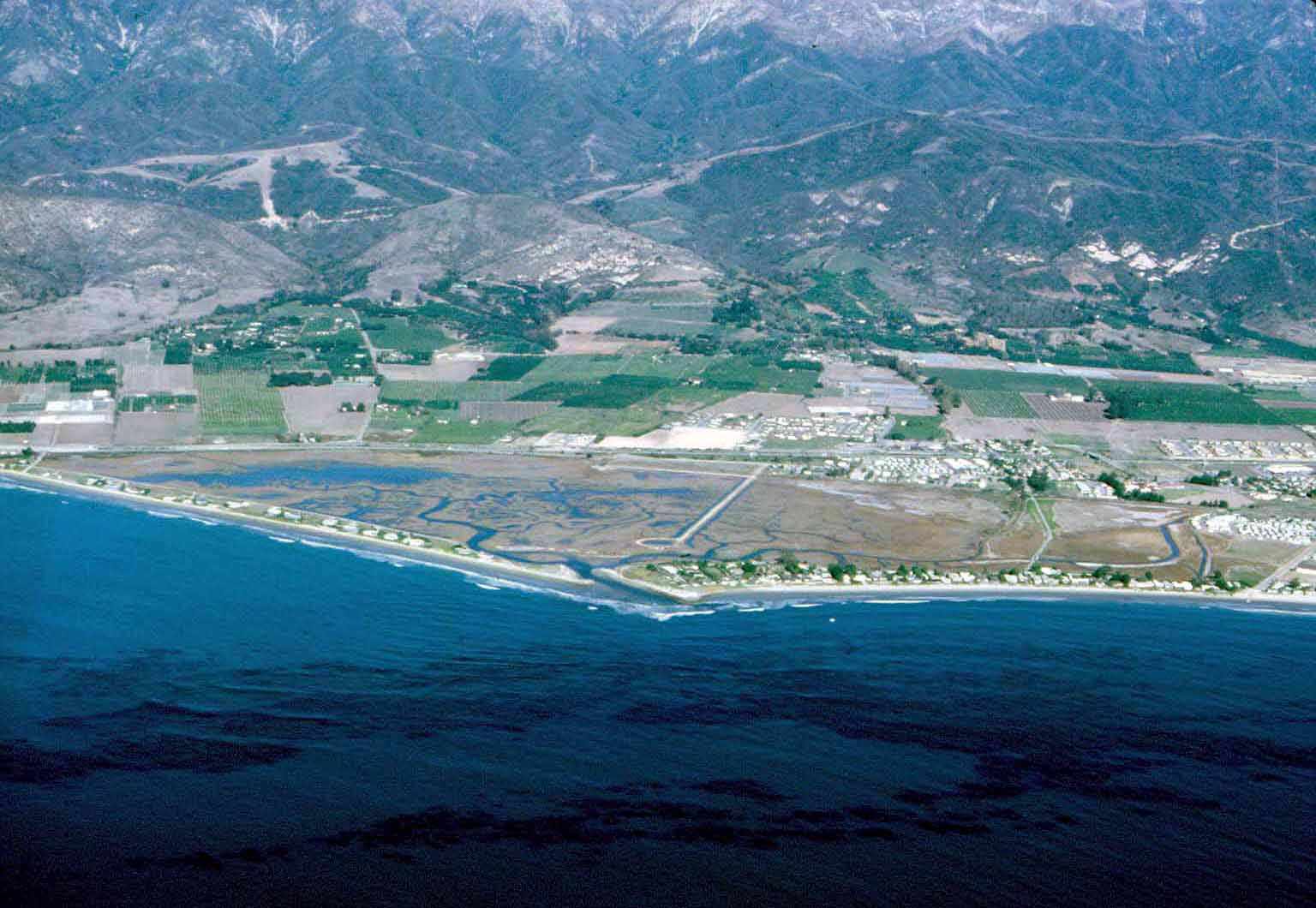
Aerial view of El Estero.

According to the United States Census Bureau, the city has a total area of 9.3 square miles (24 km^{2}), of which 2.6 square miles (6.7 km^{2}) is land and 6.7 square miles (17 km^{2}) (72.1%) is water.

The city is located almost entirely on a coastal plain in between the Santa Ynez Mountains and the Pacific Ocean. Immediately to the north of Carpinteria lie foothills and then the Santa Ynez Mountains. Between the foothills and the populated area of the city is an agricultural zone. The mountains provide a scenic backdrop to town, covered in chaparral and displaying prominent sandstone outcrops. Because of the well-ventilated nature of the air basin, ozone concentrations are low while air quality is high.

Seals and sea lions can be seen in the area December through May at the rookery in the nearby Carpinteria Bluffs, as well as an occasional gray whale. Tidepools contain starfish, sea anemones, crabs, snails, octopuses and sea urchins.

There is bird watching at Carpinteria Salt Marsh Reserve, established in 1977 and administered by the Natural Reserve System of the University of California.

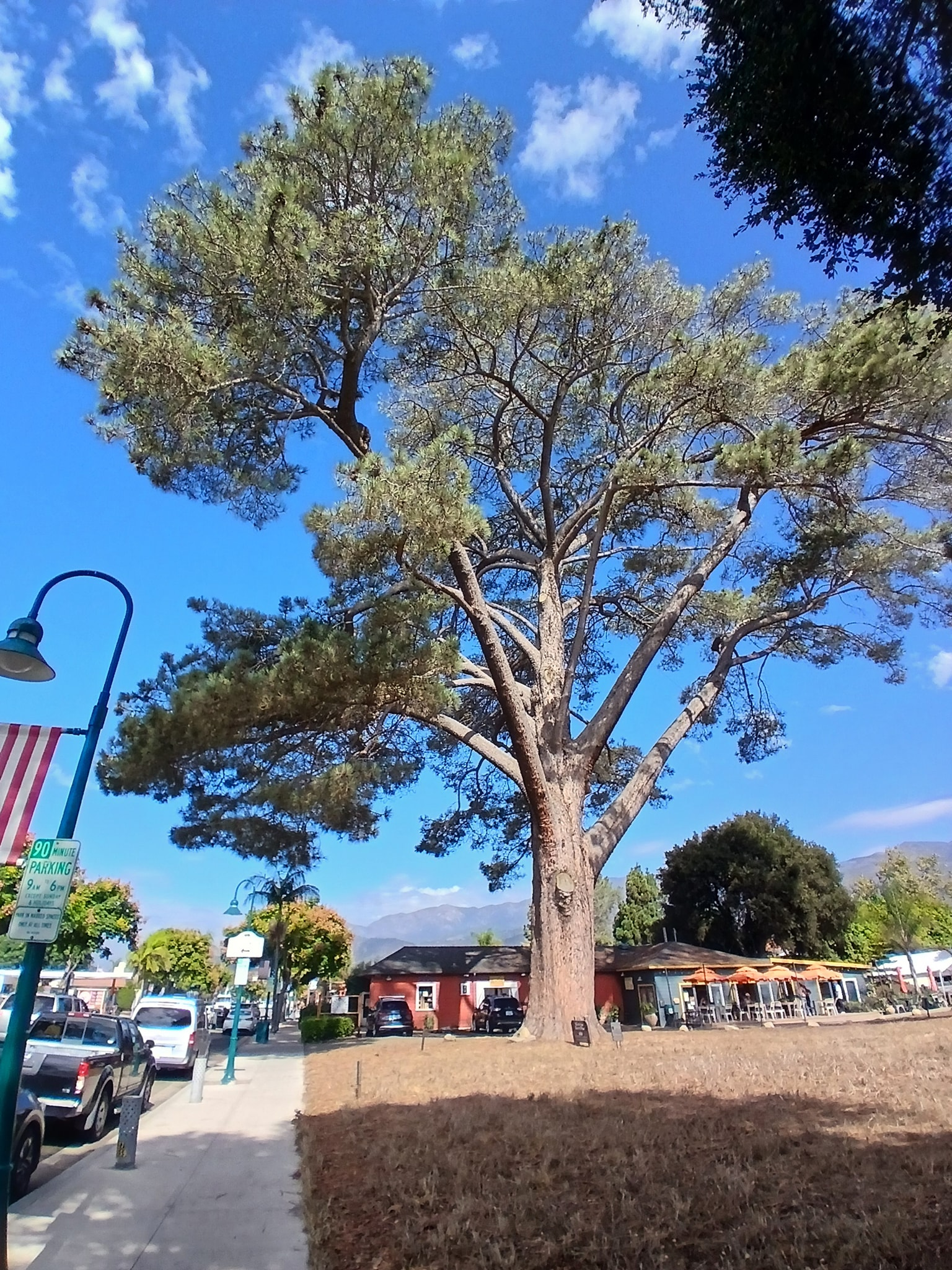
The Wardholme Torrey Pine. Largest in the world. Picture taken on 09/24/2025.

The Wardholme Torrey Pine, the largest known Torrey pine tree on earth, is located in downtown Carpinteria.

=== Climate ===
This region experiences warm (but not hot) and dry summers, with no average monthly temperatures above 71.6 °F. According to the Köppen Climate Classification system, Carpinteria has a warm-summer Mediterranean climate, abbreviated "Csb" on climate maps.

Climate data for Carpenteria, California
Month	Jan	Feb	Mar	Apr	May	Jun	Jul	Aug	Sep	Oct	Nov	Dec	Year
Mean daily maximum °F (°C)	62.9 (17.2)	63.9 (17.7)	64.6 (18.1)	67.3 (19.6)	69.0 (20.6)	70.4 (21.3)	73.2 (22.9)	73.8 (23.2)	73.6 (23.1)	71.7 (22.1)	67.8 (19.9)	63.3 (17.4)	68.5 (20.3)
Mean daily minimum °F (°C)	43.2 (6.2)	45.1 (7.3)	47.3 (8.5)	49.3 (9.6)	52.4 (11.3)	55.2 (12.9)	58.0 (14.4)	58.2 (14.6)	57.1 (13.9)	53.0 (11.7)	47.1 (8.4)	43.2 (6.2)	50.8 (10.4)
Average precipitation inches (mm)	4.70 (119)	4.34 (110)	3.29 (84)	1.04 (26)	0.46 (12)	0.14 (3.6)	0.05 (1.3)	0.03 (0.76)	0.09 (2.3)	0.81 (21)	1.22 (31)	2.81 (71)	18.98 (482)

== Demographics ==
Historical population
Census	Pop.	Note	%±
1950	2,864		—
1960	4,998		74.5%
1970	6,982		39.7%
1980	10,835		55.2%
1990	13,747		26.9%
2000	14,194		3.3%
2010	13,040		−8.1%
2020	13,264		1.7%
2023 (est.)	12,711	▼	−4.2%
U.S. Decennial Census; 1860–1870 1880-1890; 1900 1910 1920; 1930 1940 1950; 1960 1970 1980; 1990 2000 2010; 2020

=== 2020 census ===
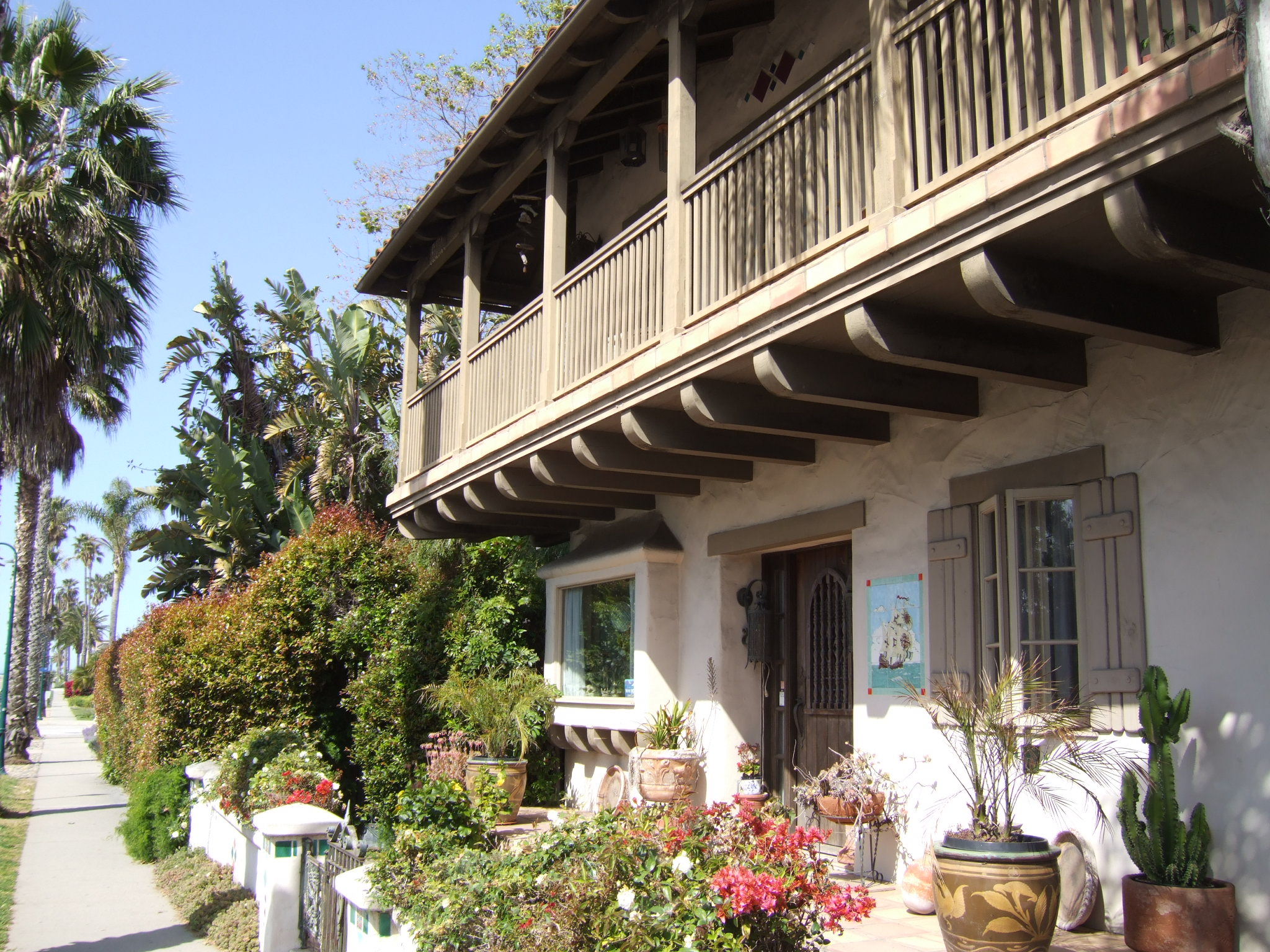
Monterey Revival architecture in Carpinteria.

As of the 2020 census, Carpinteria had a population of 13,264 and a population density of 5,125.2 inhabitants per square mile (1,978.9/km^{2}).

100.0% of residents lived in urban areas, while 0.0% lived in rural areas.

Racial composition as of the 2020 census
Race	Number	Percent
White	7,106	53.6%
Black or African American	102	0.8%
American Indian and Alaska Native	230	1.7%
Asian	303	2.3%
Native Hawaiian and Other Pacific Islander	8	0.1%
Some other race	2,945	22.2%
Two or more races	2,570	19.4%
Hispanic or Latino (of any race)	6,473	48.8%

The census reported that 99.2% of the population lived in households, 0.3% lived in non-institutionalized group quarters, and 0.5% were institutionalized.

There were 4,968 households, of which 31.8% had children under the age of 18. Of all households, 47.2% were married-couple households, 6.3% were cohabiting couple households, 30.7% had a female householder with no spouse or partner present, and 15.8% had a male householder with no spouse or partner present. 25.7% of households were one-person households, and 14.4% were one-person households with someone aged 65 or older. The average household size was 2.65. There were 3,312 families (66.7% of all households).

The age distribution was 20.4% under the age of 18, 7.4% aged 18 to 24, 24.1% aged 25 to 44, 26.7% aged 45 to 64, and 21.3% who were 65 years of age or older. The median age was 43.3 years. For every 100 females, there were 92.6 males, and for every 100 females age 18 and over, there were 89.5 males.

There were 5,689 housing units at an average density of 2,198.2 units per square mile (848.7 units/km^{2}), of which 4,968 (87.3%) were occupied. Of occupied housing units, 55.4% were owner-occupied and 44.6% were occupied by renters. 12.7% of housing units were vacant. The homeowner vacancy rate was 1.1% and the rental vacancy rate was 3.2%.

=== 2023 estimate ===
In 2023, the US Census Bureau estimated that the median household income was $104,233, and the per capita income was $52,711. About 3.9% of families and 6.0% of the population were below the poverty line.

=== 2010 census ===
At the 2010 census Carpinteria had a population of 13,040. The population density was 1,406.5 inhabitants per square mile (543.1/km^{2}). The racial makeup of Carpinteria was 9,348 (71.7%) White, Hispanic or Latino of any race were 6,351 persons (48.7%), 109 (0.8%) African American, 144 (1.1%) Native American, 296 (2.3%) Asian, 15 (0.1%) Pacific Islander, 2,599 (19.9%) from other races, and 529 (4.1%) from two or more races.

The census reported that 13,021 people (99.9% of the population) lived in households, 19 (0.1%) lived in non-institutionalized group quarters, and no one was institutionalized.

There were 4,759 households, 1,510 (31.7%) had children under the age of 18 living in them, 2,305 (48.4%) were married couples living together, 597 (12.5%) had a female householder with no husband present, 239 (5.0%) had a male householder with no wife present. There were 293 (6.2%) unmarried opposite-sex partnerships, and 28 (0.6%) same-sex married couples or partnerships. 1,203 households (25.3%) were one person and 525 (11.0%) had someone living alone who was 65 or older. The average household size was 2.74. There were 3,141 families (66.0% of households); the average family size was 3.23.

The age distribution was 2,791 people (21.4%) under the age of 18, 1,267 people (9.7%) aged 18 to 24, 3,466 people (26.6%) aged 25 to 44, 3,717 people (28.5%) aged 45 to 64, and 1,799 people (13.8%) who were 65 or older. The median age was 39.5 years. For every 100 females, there were 97.2 males. For every 100 females age 18 and over, there were 95.3 males.

There were 5,429 housing units at an average density of 585.6 per square mile, of the occupied units 2,347 (49.3%) were owner-occupied and 2,412 (50.7%) were rented. The homeowner vacancy rate was 1.8%; the rental vacancy rate was 6.5%. 6,130 people (47.0% of the population) lived in owner-occupied housing units and 6,891 people (52.8%) lived in rental housing units.

== Economy ==
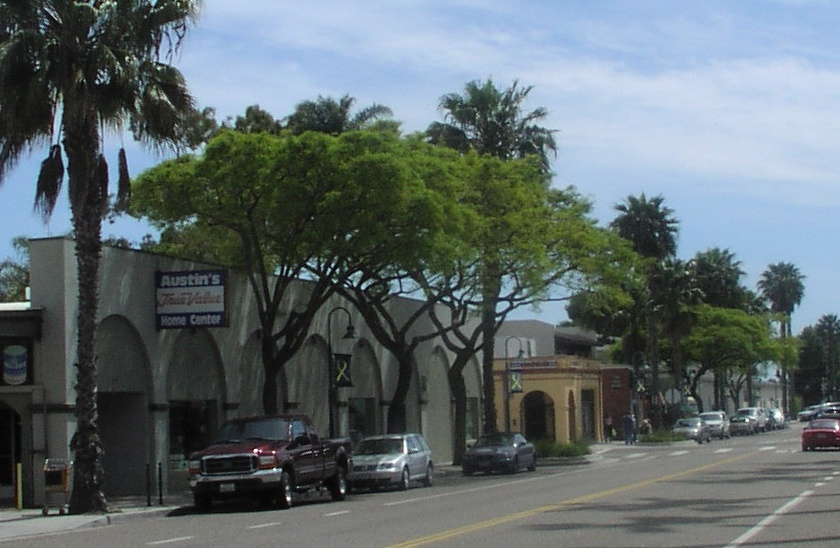
Downtown Carpinteria.

lynda.com, an online software training company ranked as one of the fastest-growing private companies in the U.S. (according to Inc. magazine's 2010 500|5000 company listing) had its headquarters in Carpinteria. The company was purchased by LinkedIn in 2015 for $1.5 billion. ProCore Technologies, a construction management software company, also has its headquarters in Carpinteria.

Since 1987, the California Avocado Festival has been held in Carpinteria on the first weekend of October.

The Santa Barbara Polo Club, one of the main equestrian polo fields in the country, is located just West of Carpinteria (outside of city limits).

The city is also home to Pete's Living, an organic produce company that was previously known as Hollandia Produce.

=== Top employers ===
According to the city's 2020 Comprehensive Annual Financial Report, the top employers in the city are:

#	Employer	# of Employees
1	Procore Technologies	865
2	Agilent (formerly Dako)	418
3	LinkedIn	340
4	Carpinteria Unified School District	310
5	NuSil Technology	288
6	Gigavac	248
7	Bega US	166
8	AGIA, Inc.	121
9	Continental Auto Systems	116
10	Plan Member	100

== Arts and culture ==
Carpinteria hosts an annual California Avocado Festival, with a history extending back to 1986. Over 80,000 persons attend the three-day festival which takes place during the first weekend of October. The festival offers avocado products and locally made goods. It also hosts the Carpinteria Arts Center.

== Education ==
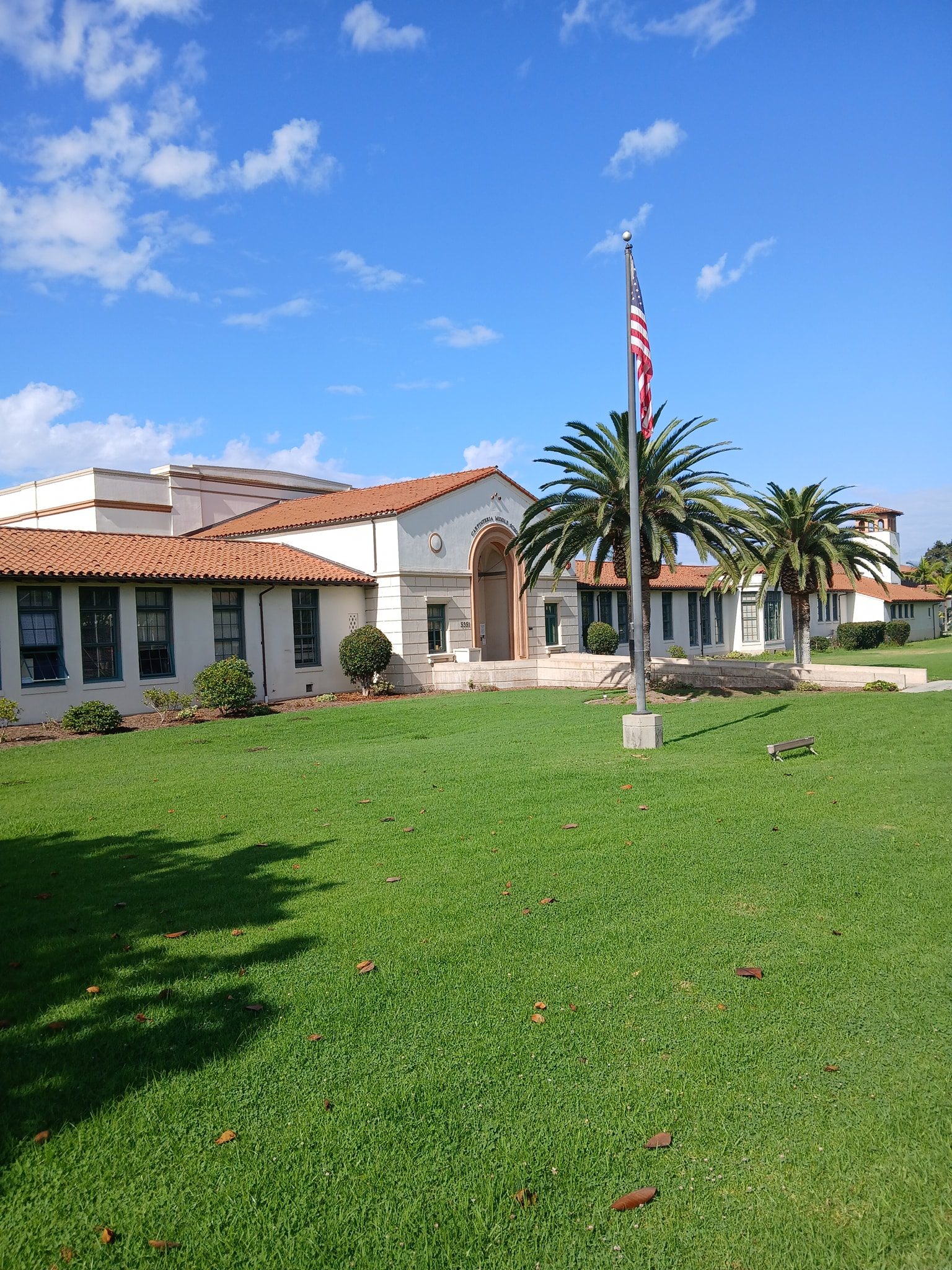
Carpinteria Middle School

The city of Carpinteria is served by the Carpinteria Unified School District. It includes one high school, one middle (junior high) school, and Three public elementary schools, one of which is an alternative school of choice (K-5). The district also has an alternative high school. Other schools include: Howard Carden School, a private pre-K-8 elementary school, Carpinteria Christian School, a Baptist K-8 school, Cate School, a private preparatory school and Pacifica Graduate Institute, home of the Joseph Campbell and Marija Gimbutas Library. This graduate school offers master's and PhD programs in depth psychology and mythology.

The Carpinteria Unified School District, which also includes the community of Summerland, and some outlying areas, includes the following:

- Carpinteria High School (4810 Foothill Rd)
- Rincon High School (4698 Foothill Rd)
- Foothill Alternative High (4698 Foothill Rd)
- Carpinteria Middle|Carpinteria Middle School (5351 Carpinteria Ave)
- Canalino Elementary (1480 Linden Ave)
- Aliso Elementary (4545 Carpinteria Ave)
- Summerland Elementary (135 Valencia Road)
- Carpinteria Family School (1480 Linden Ave)

Students at elementary schools prepared two web sites about Carpinteria for the year 2000 and 2001 International Schools CyberFair competitions.

== Transportation ==
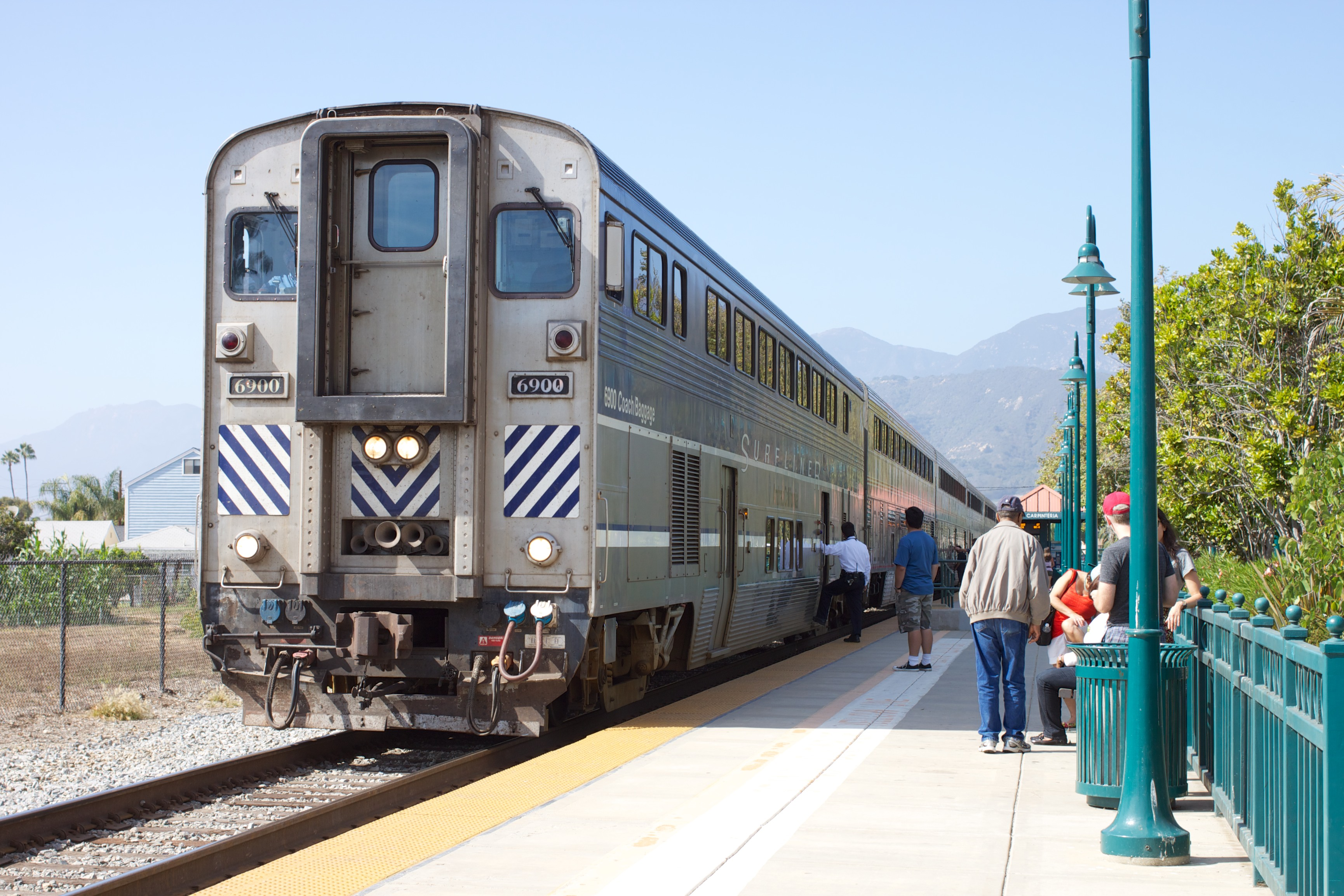
Amtrak's Pacific Surfliner at Carpinteria Station.

U.S. Route 101 passes through Carpinteria, connecting the city to major destinations such as Los Angeles as well as Santa Barbara and points further north such as San Francisco. State Route 150 passes through a portion of Carpinteria, providing connections to Ojai and Santa Paula. State Route 192 also has a short segment in Carpinteria, providing a westward connection to Santa Barbara.

The Carpinteria Amtrak Station is served by Amtrak's Pacific Surfliner, which stretches between San Luis Obispo in the north and Los Angeles and San Diego in the south.

MTD provides local bus service in Carpinteria, along with connections to Montecito and Santa Barbara. VCTC Intercity provides commuter bus service to Ventura, Santa Barbara, and Los Angeles.

== Notable people ==
- Ichak Adizes, business consultant
- Stan Cornyn, recording executive
- Ellen DeGeneres, comedian, talk show host
- Chris Gocong, artist and retired football player
- Mila Kunis, actress
- Ashton Kutcher, actor
- Dennis Miller, comedian, talk show host
- Robert Zemeckis, film director
