= Hollandia Produce =

American agricultural company branded as Pete's Living Greens

- Type: Private
- Industry: Food industry
- Founded: 1970
- Headquarters: Carpinteria, California
- Key people: Peter Overgaag, CEO
- Products: Vegetables
- Number of employees: 70
- Website: www.eatpetes.com

Hollandia Produce Inc. is an American agricultural company based in Carpinteria, California that specializes in the production and wholesale and retail marketing of vegetables, which it grows in greenhouses using hydroponic methods. All of its products are sold under its label "Pete's Living Greens". The company was established in 1970 by Art and Magda Overgaag.

== Products ==
The lettuce types grown are butter lettuce, known also as bibb lettuce, red butter lettuce, and the three lettuces red oak leaf, lollo bionda and lollo rossa, which are grown, harvested, and sold together in one package. The company also grows Barbarea verna, also known as Upland Cress and early yellowrocket. Tomatoes, arugula and watercress have also been grown.

== Hydroponic method ==
The hydroponic method used by the company recycles water, and the company collects rainwater runoff in retention basins to reduce erosion and protect nearby estuaries. The company claims that its hydroponic greenhouse production of lettuce conserves from 65 to 84 percent of the water that would be used if the lettuce were field-grown, depending on field conditions, time of year, and other factors.

== Distinguishing features ==
Distinguishing features include the vegetables’ ability to retain freshness for longer than conventionally harvested vegetables resulting from the roots remaining intact at harvest, enabling packaging to promote a micro-environment which extends the life of the plant. Predator insects are used for pest management.
