= Santa Barbara Metropolitan Transit District =

Public transit agency in Santa Barbara County, California

Coordinates: 34.42101°N 119.70348°W

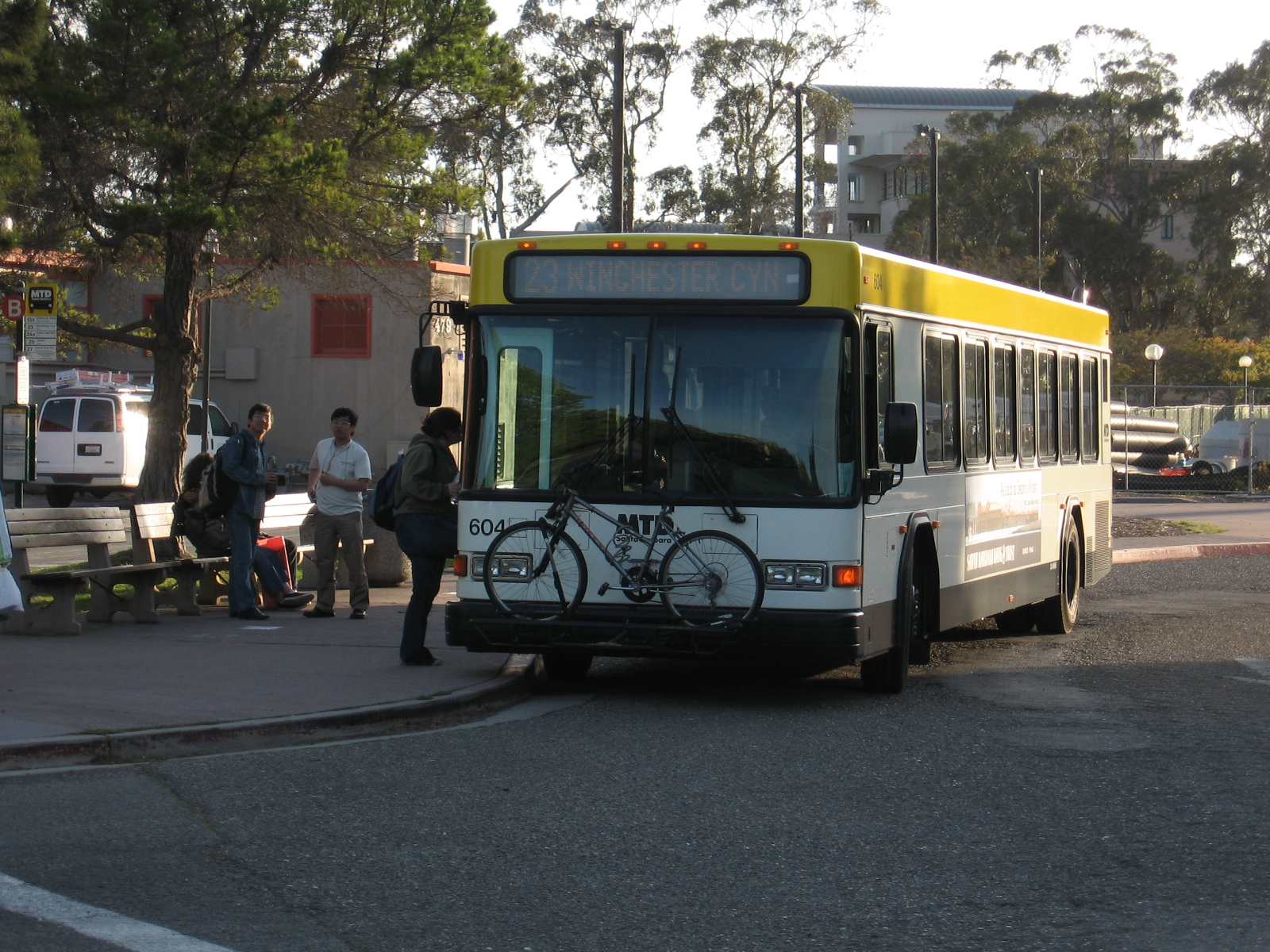
- An MTD bus at UCSB in 2007.
- Founded: 1968
- Headquarters: 1020 Chapala Street; Santa Barbara, California
- Service area: Santa Barbara, Carpinteria, Goleta, Montecito, Summerland, Isla Vista
- Service type: Transit bus
- Routes: 37
- Fleet: 113 buses
- Daily ridership: 15,400 (weekdays, Q2 2026)
- Annual ridership: 4,718,600 (2025)
- Fuel type: CNG, battery electric
- Website: sbmtd.gov

The Santa Barbara Metropolitan Transit District (MTD) is a public transit agency providing bus service in the southern portion of Santa Barbara County, California. It serves the cities of Santa Barbara, Carpinteria, and Goleta as well as the unincorporated areas of Montecito, Summerland, and Isla Vista. In 2025, the system had a ridership of 4,718,600, or about 15,400 per weekday as of the second quarter of 2026.

== History ==
Mule-powered street railways were implemented in 1875 and were gradually replaced by electric streetcars in 1896. The streetcars made their last run on July 1, 1929; about a month later, the Santa Barbara Transit Corporation company started providing local bus service (H.A. Spreitz, its owner, already operated another bus company that served the suburban areas of Goleta and Carpinteria. In the late 1950s and 60s, Santa Barbara Transit was losing revenue, and repeatedly threatened to go out of business. Strikes were also a problem, as the company could not afford to pay its employees.

At first, the City of Santa Barbara considered subsidizing the transit company, but since service was needed to Carpinteria and Goleta as well, a transit district was thought to be a better choice, because it would also be able to levy taxes on separately. Voters approved the formation of the MTD in 1966.

Over the years, service has expanded, particularly on routes serving the University of California, Santa Barbara and Santa Barbara City College. Bus schedules were being distributed from 1983 onwards.

In August 2012 MTD implemented peak-hour commuter service (Coastal Express Limited) between Ventura and the Santa Barbara/Goleta area.

== Routes ==
=== Local routes ===
All routes serving Downtown Santa Barbara begin and end at the Transit Center

Route	Terminals		via	Notes
1	Santa Barbara MTD Transit Center	Santa Barbara Modoc Rd & Portesuello Av	San Andres St	
2	Santa Barbara MTD Transit Center	Santa Barbara Punta Gorda St & Salinas St	Anapamu St	
3	Santa Barbara MTD Transit Center	Santa Barbara Foothill Rd & Cieneguitas Rd	State St	
4	Santa Barbara MTD Transit Center	Santa Barbara Santa Barbara City College	Carrillo St, Cliff Dr	
5	Santa Barbara MTD Transit Center	Santa Barbara State St & La Cumbre Rd	Cliff Dr	Serves Santa Barbara City College
6	Santa Barbara MTD Transit Center	Goleta Hollister Av & Storke Rd	State St, Hollister Av	
7	Santa Barbara MTD Transit Center	Goleta Hollister Av & Kellogg Av	US-101	
11	Santa Barbara MTD Transit Center	Goleta Storke Rd & Hollister Av	State St, Hollister Av	Serves Santa Barbara Airport and UC Santa Barbara
14	Santa Barbara MTD Transit Center	Montecito Jameson Ln & Sheffield Dr	Valley Rd	
16	Santa Barbara MTD Transit Center	Santa Barbara Santa Barbara City College	Cliff Dr	Temporarily Suspended
17	Santa Barbara MTD Transit Center	Santa Barbara Santa Barbara City College	Carrillo St	
20	Santa Barbara MTD Transit Center	Carpinteria Via Real & Mark Av	Via Real	
23	Goleta Storke Rd & Hollister Av	Goleta Winchester Canyon Rd & Bradford Dr	Calle Real	
25	Goleta Hollister Av & Storke Rd	Goleta Calle Real & Winchester Pl	Hollister Av	
27	Isla Vista UC Santa Barbara	Goleta Santa Felicia Dr & Marketplace	Storke Rd	Isla Vista Shuttle
28	Isla Vista UC Santa Barbara	Goleta Santa Felicia Dr & Marketplace	El Colegio Rd	UCSB Shuttle

=== Express routes ===
Route	Terminals		Via	Notes
12X	Santa Barbara MTD Transit Center	Goleta Hollister Av & Kellogg Av	US-101	
15X	Isla Vista UC Santa Barbara	Santa Barbara Santa Barbara City College	US-101	
19X	Santa Barbara Santa Barbara City College	Carpinteria Carpinteria Av & Palm Av	US-101	
24X	Santa Barbara MTD Transit Center	Goleta Storke Rd & Hollister Av	US-101	Serves UC Santa Barbara

=== School supplementary routes ===
Services operate weekdays only.

Route	Terminals		Via	Notes
2010	Santa Barbara MTD Transit Center		State St	To Alpha Resource Center
2110	Santa Barbara San Barbara Junior High School		Cota St	To MTD Transit Center
2410	Goleta Turnpike Rd & Ukiah St	Santa Barbara La Colina Junior High School	Hollister Av	
2420	Goleta University Dr & Patterson Av	Santa Barbara La Colina Junior High School	Cathedral Oaks Rd	
2430	Goleta Hollister Av & San Ricardo Dr	Santa Barbara La Colina Junior High School	Hollister Av	
2510	Santa Barbara Rancheria St & Gutierrez St	Santa Barbara San Marcos High School	San Andres St	
2520	Santa Barbara MTD Transit Center	Santa Barbara San Marcos High School	US-101	
2530	Santa Barbara Carrillo St & San Andres St	Santa Barbara San Marcos High School	San Andres St, Modoc Rd	
2540	Santa Barbara Haley St & Bath St	Santa Barbara San Marcos High School	Cliff Dr, Las Positas Rd	
2610	Goleta Hollister Av & Kellogg Av	Goleta Fairview Av & Encina Rd	Hollister Av	
2620	Goleta Winchester Canyon Rd & Bradford Dr	Goleta Cathedral Oaks Rd & Camino Laguna Vista	Cathedral Oaks Rd	
2630	Goleta Hollister Av & Cathedral Oaks Rd	Goleta Goleta Valley Junior High School	Hollister Av, US-101	
2650	Isla Vista Camino Pescadero & El Colegio Rd	Goleta Goleta Valley Junior High School	Cathedral Oaks Rd	
2710	Isla Vista Camino Pescadero & El Colegio Rd	Goleta Dos Pueblos High School	Storke Rd	
2720	Goleta Hollister Av & Turnpike Rd	Goleta Dos Pueblos High School	Hollister Av	
2730	Santa Barbara State St & La Cumbre Rd	Goleta Dos Pueblos High School	Cathedral Oaks Rd	
2740	Goleta Los Carneros Rd & Karl Storz Dr	Goleta Dos Pueblos High School	Hollister Av	

== Fare structure ==
=== Contactless fare payment ===
Some vehicles are equipped with a contactless fare reading device that allows customers to pay using a credit/debit/prepaid card or a mobile wallet on smart devices.
