= Summerland, California =

- Unincorporated Community; Census Designated Place
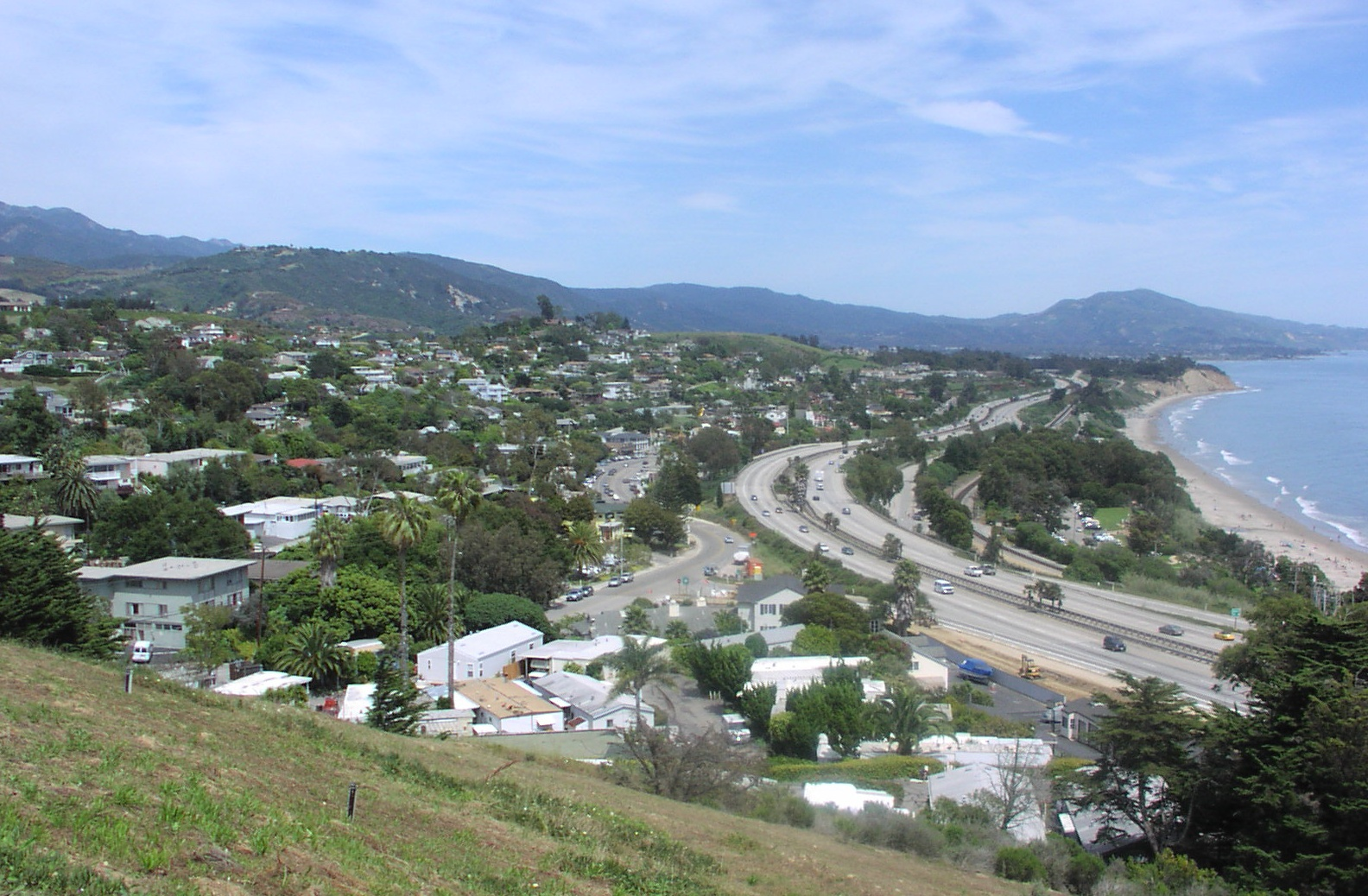
- Summerland, as seen from the top of Ortega Hill, 2006

- Location in Santa Barbara County and the state of California
- Coordinates: 34°25′17″N 119°35′45″W
- Country: United States
- State: California
- County: Santa Barbara

Government
  - State senator: Monique Limón (D)
  - Assemblymember: Gregg Hart (D)
  - U. S. rep.: Salud Carbajal (D)

Area
  - Total: 7.386 sq mi (19.130 km^{2})
  - Land: 1.397 sq mi (3.618 km^{2})
  - Water: 5.989 sq mi (15.511 km^{2}) 81.09%
- Elevation: 121 ft (37 m)

Population (2020)
  - Total: 1,222
  - Density: 875/sq mi (337.7/km^{2})
- Time zone: UTC-8 (Pacific)
  - Summer (DST): UTC-7 (PDT)
- ZIP code: 93067
- Area code: 805
- FIPS code: 06-75714
- GNIS feature ID: 1656637

Summerland is a census designated place (CDP) in Santa Barbara County, California, United States. The population was 1,222 at the 2020 census, down from 1,448 at the 2010 census.

The town includes a school and a Presbyterian Church. There are many small businesses.

== History ==
Tar from natural oil seeps in the Summerland area was used for sealing their ocean-going tomols by the Chumash people and for the Mission Santa Barbara as waterproofing for the roof.

In 1883, spiritualist and real estate speculator H.L. Williams founded the town of Summerland. In 1888 he divided his land tract, on a moderately sloping hill facing the ocean, into numerous parcels. He promoted the tiny lots – 25 x 60 – to fellow Spiritualists, who bought them in quantity and moved to the area. The spiritual center of the town was a Spiritualist Church, with séance room, demolished when Highway 101 was put through in the 1950s.

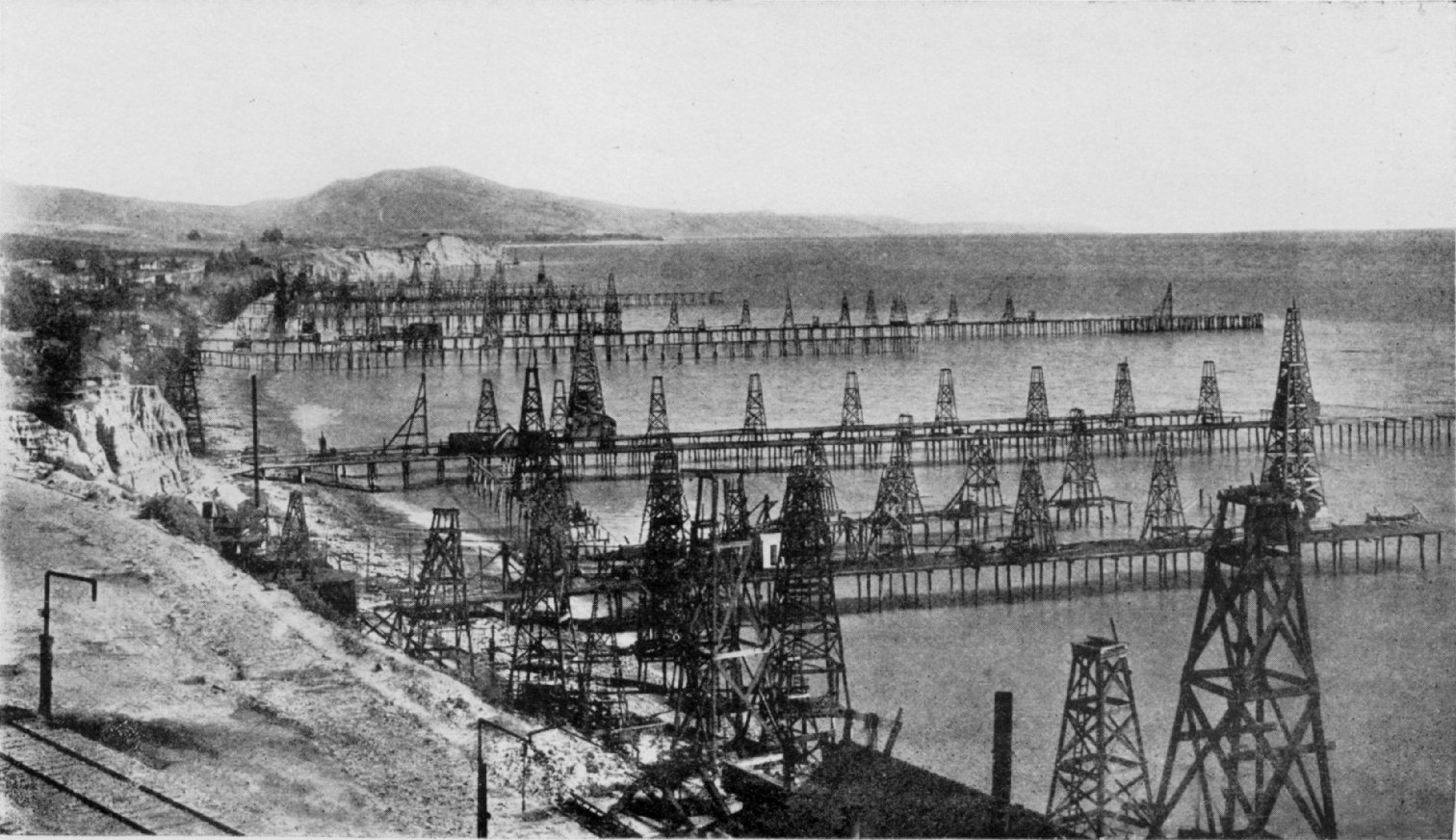
Oil wells just off the coast, before 1906

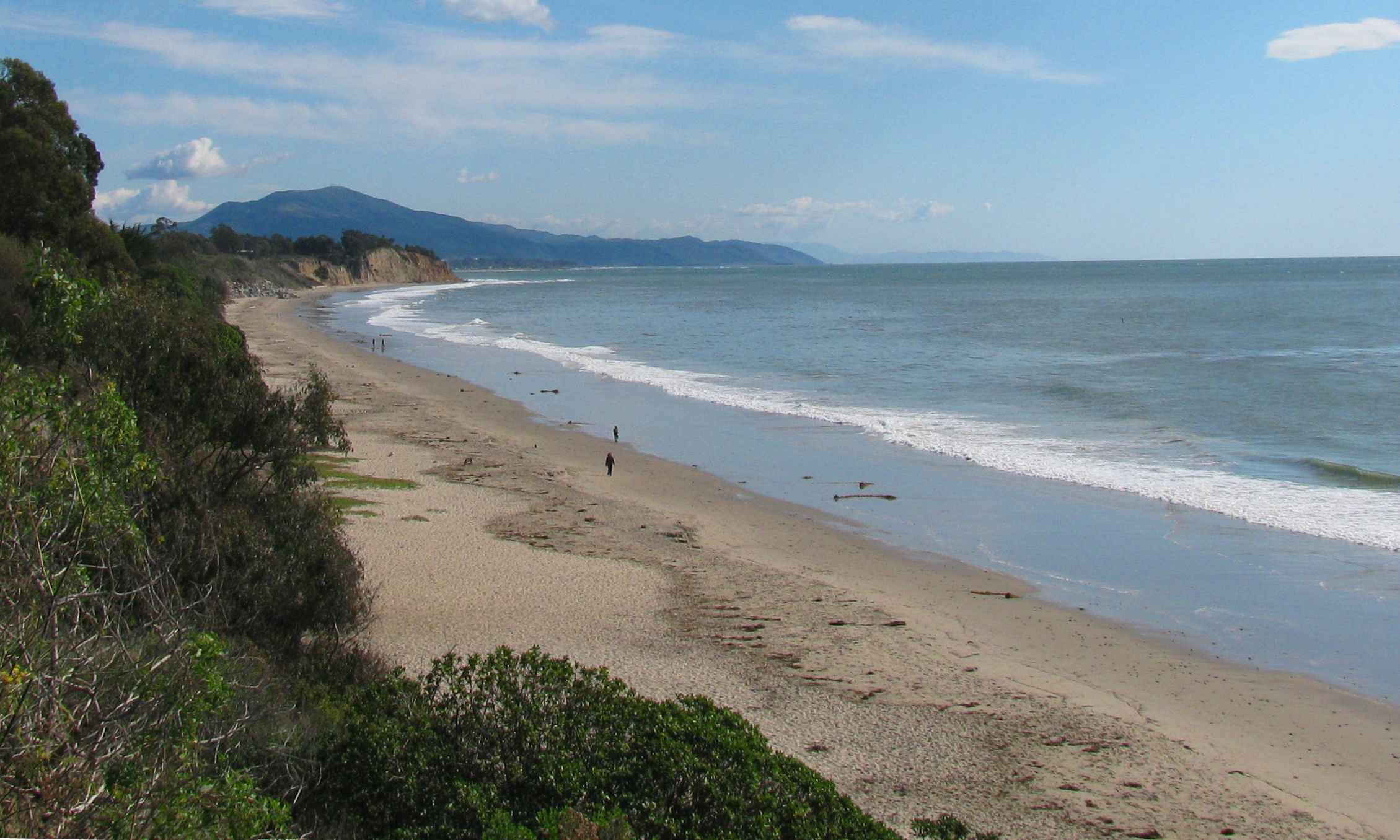
The same view in 2009

In the 1890s, oil development began in the coastal area of Summerland, at the Summerland Oil Field. Numerous wooden oil derricks were built on the beach, and on piers stretching into the ocean. The world's first offshore oil well, drilled into the sea floor, was at this location. Production at this beach area peaked before 1910, although most of the rigs remained into the 1920s. Peak production from the onshore portion of the Summerland Field did not occur until 1930; the last oil was pumped from the nearshore region in 1940.

In 1957, Standard Oil Co. of California (now Chevron) found the large Summerland Offshore Oil Field, several miles offshore, which was shut down in the 1990s. In January 1969, a blowout at the Dos Cuadras Field, about five miles offshore, caused the Santa Barbara Oil Spill, a formative event for the modern environmental movement.

In August 2015, Summerland's beach was closed for several days by County of Santa Barbara health officials due to large amounts of oil washed onshore. Local residents suspect the petroleum source is a leaking capped oil well ("the Becker wellhead") in the tidal area below Lookout Park.

== Geography ==
Summerland is located at 34°25′17″N 119°35′45″W (34.421395, -119.595969). It is on the coast directly east at Ortega Ridge Road at the unincorporated community of Montecito and west-northwest of the city of Carpinteria. Summerland has a significantly higher population density than the surrounding area. U.S. Route 101 goes through Summerland.

According to the United States Census Bureau, Summerland has a land area of 1.4 square miles (3.6 km^{2}). At the 2010 census, the CDP had a land area of 2.0 square miles (5.1 km^{2}).

The community is built on a set of coastal bluffs right next to the ocean. Surrounding it and Montecito are the cities of Carpinteria and Santa Barbara.

=== Climate ===
This region experiences warm (but not hot) and dry summers, with no average monthly temperatures above 71.6 °F. According to the Köppen Climate Classification system, Summerland has a warm-summer Mediterranean climate, abbreviated "Csb" on climate maps.

== Demographics ==
Historical population
Census	Pop.	Note	%±
2000	1,545		—
2010	1,448		−6.3%
2020	1,222		−15.6%
U.S. Decennial Census; 1860–1870 1880-1890; 1900 1910 1920; 1930 1940 1950; 1960 1970 1980; 1990 2000 2010; 2020

Summerland first appeared as a census designated place in the 2000 U.S. census.

=== Racial and ethnic composition ===
Summerland CDP, California – Racial and ethnic composition Note: the US Census treats Hispanic/Latino as an ethnic category. This table excludes Latinos from the racial categories and assigns them to a separate category. Hispanics/Latinos may be of any race.
Race / Ethnicity (NH = Non-Hispanic)	Pop 2000	Pop 2010	Pop 2020	% 2000	% 2010	% 2020
White alone (NH)	1,346	1,170	954	87.12%	80.80%	78.07%
Black or African American alone (NH)	7	3	6	0.45%	0.21%	0.49%
Native American or Alaska Native alone (NH)	3	6	6	0.19%	0.41%	0.49%
Asian alone (NH)	36	41	36	2.33%	2.83%	2.95%
Native Hawaiian or Pacific Islander alone (NH)	1	0	4	0.06%	0.00%	0.33%
Other race alone (NH)	1	7	3	0.06%	0.48%	0.25%
Mixed race or Multiracial (NH)	36	29	53	2.33%	2.00%	4.34%
Hispanic or Latino (any race)	115	192	160	7.44%	13.26%	13.09%
Total	1,545	1,448	1,222	100.00%	100.00%	100.00%

=== 2020 census ===
As of the 2020 census, Summerland had a population of 1,222. The population density was 874.7 inhabitants per square mile (337.7/km^{2}). The racial makeup of Summerland was 979 (80.1%) White, 7 (0.6%) African American, 16 (1.3%) Native American, 36 (2.9%) Asian, 4 (0.3%) Pacific Islander, 72 (5.9%) from other races, and 108 (8.8%) from two or more races. Hispanic or Latino of any race were 160 persons (13.1%).

The whole population lived in households. There were 587 households, out of which 103 (17.5%) had children under the age of 18 living in them, 236 (40.2%) were married-couple households, 30 (5.1%) were cohabiting couple households, 207 (35.3%) had a female householder with no spouse or partner present, and 114 (19.4%) had a male householder with no spouse or partner present. 212 households (36.1%) were one person, and 107 (18.2%) were one person aged 65 or older. The average household size was 2.08. There were 319 families (54.3% of all households).

The age distribution was 157 people (12.8%) under the age of 18, 74 people (6.1%) aged 18 to 24, 263 people (21.5%) aged 25 to 44, 353 people (28.9%) aged 45 to 64, and 375 people (30.7%) who were 65 years of age or older. The median age was 52.9 years. For every 100 females, there were 90.9 males, and for every 100 females age 18 and over there were 90.2 males.

There were 740 housing units at an average density of 529.7 units per square mile (204.5 units/km^{2}), of which 587 (79.3%) were occupied and 153 (20.7%) were vacant. Of the occupied units, 337 (57.4%) were owner-occupied and 250 (42.6%) were occupied by renters. The homeowner vacancy rate was 2.5%, and the rental vacancy rate was 4.9%.

89.4% of residents lived in urban areas, while 10.6% lived in rural areas.

=== 2010 census ===
At the 2010 census Summerland had a population of 1,448. The population density was 727.9 inhabitants per square mile (281.0/km^{2}). The racial makeup of Summerland was 1,295 (89.4%) White, 3 (0.2%) African American, 7 (0.5%) Native American, 41 (2.8%) Asian, 6 (0.4%) Pacific Islander, 51 (3.5%) from other races, and 45 (3.1%) from two or more races. Hispanic or Latino of any race were 192 people (13.3%).

The whole population lived in households, no one lived in non-institutionalized group quarters and no one was institutionalized.

There were 687 households, 128 (18.6%) had children under the age of 18 living in them, 270 (39.3%) were opposite-sex married couples living together, 55 (8.0%) had a female householder with no husband present, 23 (3.3%) had a male householder with no wife present. There were 54 (7.9%) unmarried opposite-sex partnerships, and 9 (1.3%) same-sex married couples or partnerships. 230 households (33.5%) were one person and 62 (9.0%) had someone living alone who was 65 or older. The average household size was 2.11. There were 348 families (50.7% of households); the average family size was 2.68.

The age distribution was 211 people (14.6%) under the age of 18, 119 people (8.2%) aged 18 to 24, 315 people (21.8%) aged 25 to 44, 546 people (37.7%) aged 45 to 64, and 257 people (17.7%) who were 65 or older. The median age was 49.2 years. For every 100 females, there were 92.0 males. For every 100 females age 18 and over, there were 88.6 males.

There were 823 housing units at an average density of 413.7 per square mile, of the occupied units 362 (52.7%) were owner-occupied and 325 (47.3%) were rented. The homeowner vacancy rate was 3.2%; the rental vacancy rate was 9.7%. 790 people (54.6% of the population) lived in owner-occupied housing units and 658 people (45.4%) lived in rental housing units.

=== Income and poverty ===
In 2023, the US Census Bureau estimated that the median household income was $133,083, and the per capita income was $73,983. About 0.0% of families and 5.4% of the population were below the poverty line.

== In popular culture ==
- Is mentioned in the Everclear song "Summerland", from their Sparkle and Fade album.
- Is the main location in the T.V. show Summerland.
- Is the title of a song by King's X on their album Gretchen Goes to Nebraska. The song's lyrics do not otherwise specifically reference the town.
- Is featured prominently in the climactic scenes of the science fiction film The Space Between Us.
- Is the title of a song by indie pop/rock group half•alive.

== Notable people ==
- Julian Ritter, artist.
- Harry Thomason, film and television director and producer.
