= Roripaugh =

Roripaugh is a surname. Notable people with the surname include:

- Lee Ann Roripaugh (born 1965), American poet
- Robert Roripaugh (1930–2019), American poet
