= Alhadeff =

Alhadeff is a Jewish Sephardic surname of Arabic (from the verb هَدَى (hadā) "to guide" preceded by the article اَل (al-) "the", thus literally "the guided"; cf. Huda) and then Spanish-Moorish origin which is found most often among the Eastern Sephardim who left Spain before 1492 to settle in the Eastern Mediterranean region, especially on the Greek island of Rhodes. Variations of this surname include Alhadef and Alhadahef.

== People ==
- Brian Asher Alhadeff, American conductor
- Cara Judea Alhadeff, American photographer and performance artist
- Lori Alhadeff, American activist
