= Lompoc, California =

City in California, United States

- City
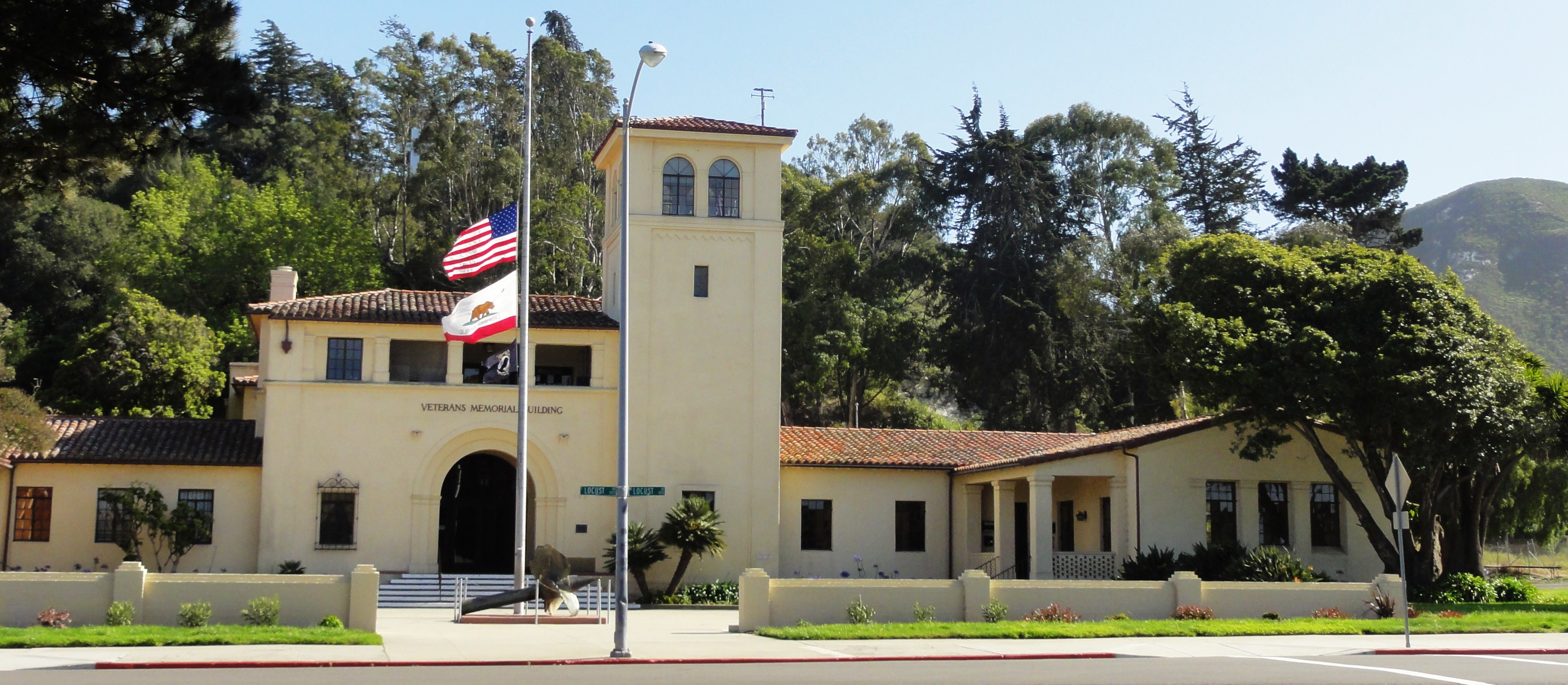
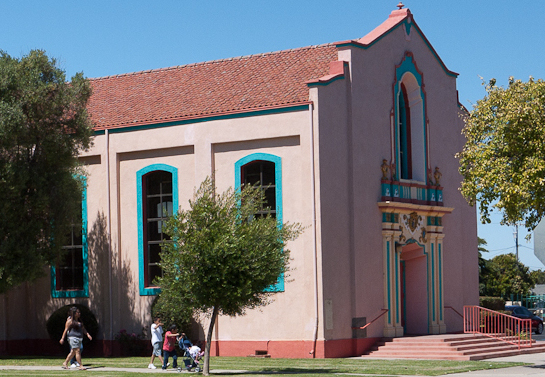
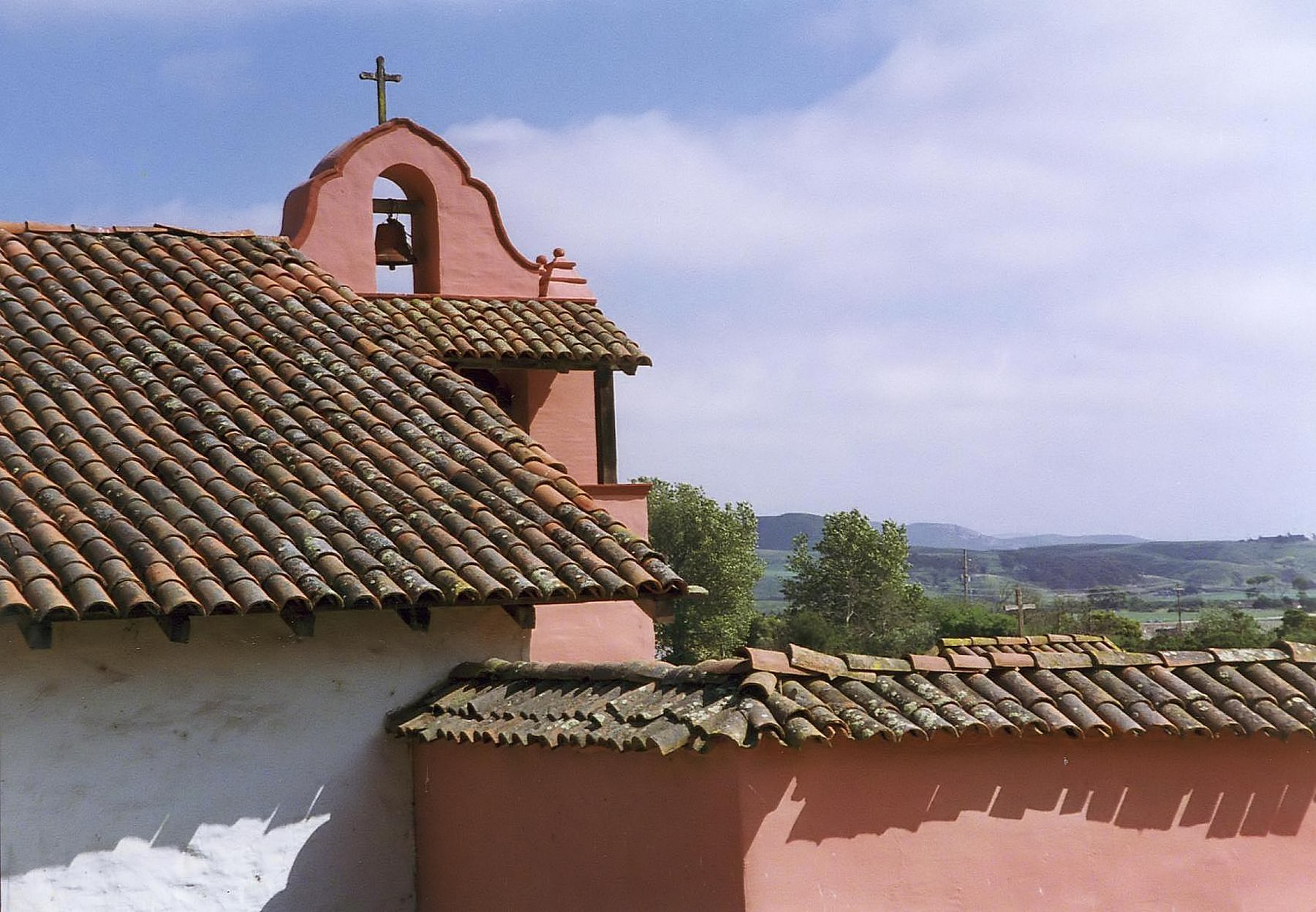
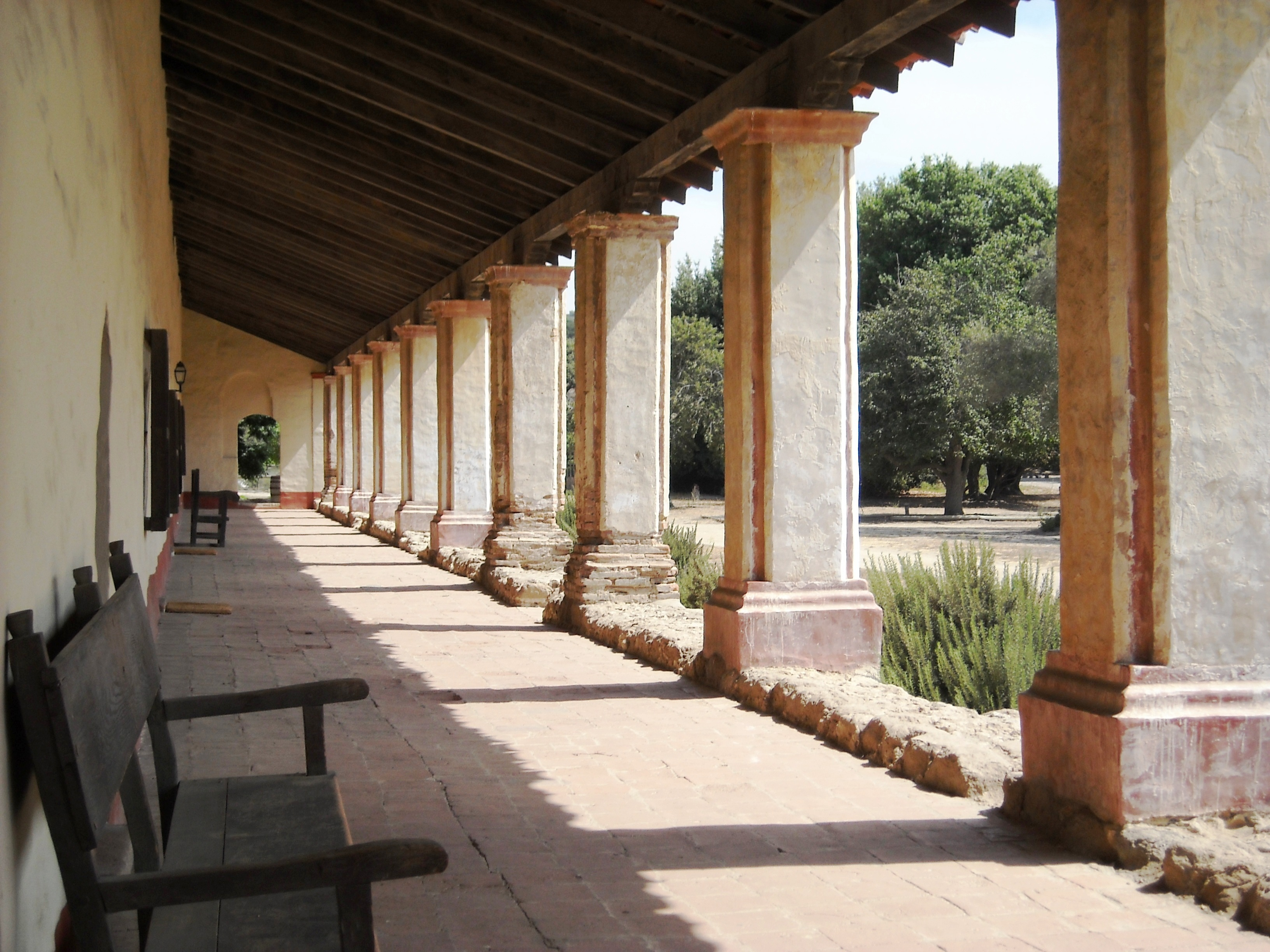
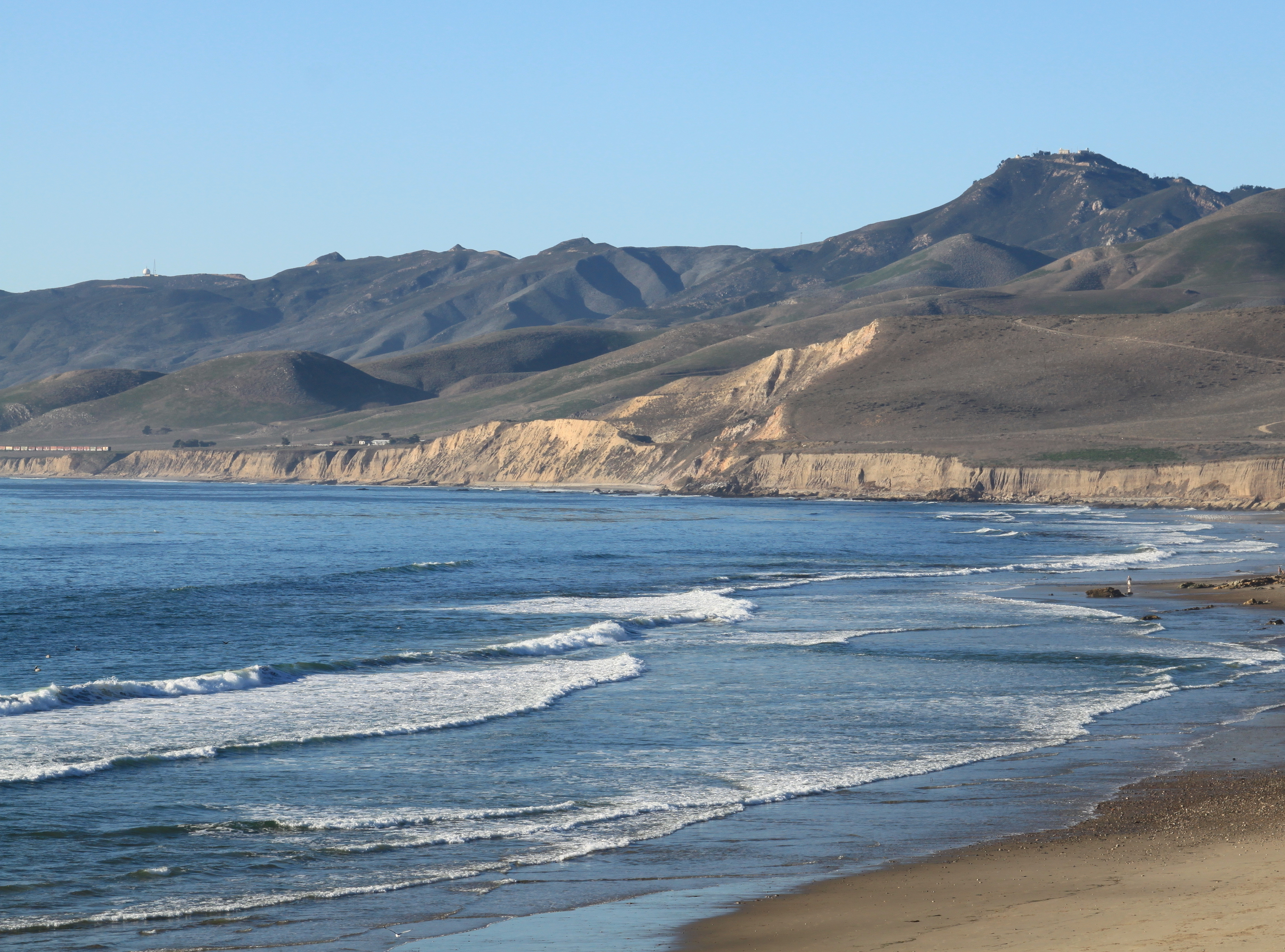
- Veterans Memorial Building La Purísima Concepción Church La Purisima Mission La Purisima Mission Jalama Beach

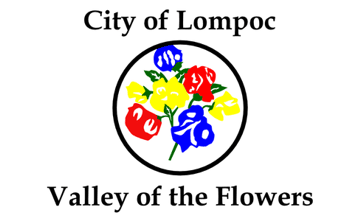
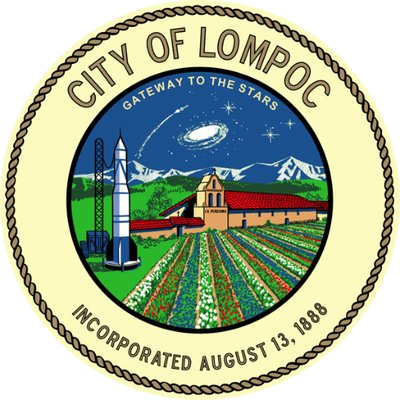
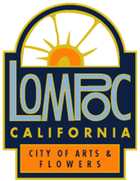
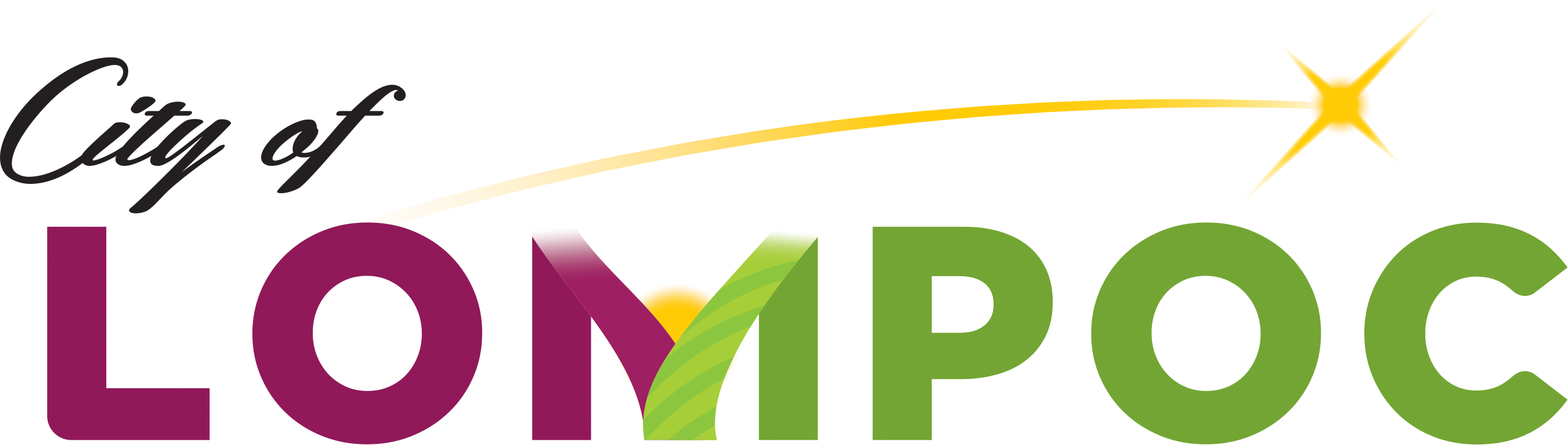
- Flag Seal Coat of arms Wordmark
- Nickname: "City of Arts and Flowers"
- Location in Santa Barbara County and California

- Location in California Location in Southern California Location in the United States
- Coordinates: 34°38′46″N 120°27′37″W
- Country: United States
- State: California
- County: Santa Barbara
- Incorporated: August 13, 1888
- Named for: Purisimeño:lumpo'o̥: "Lakes/lagoons"

Government
  - City council: Mayor James Mosby; Steve Bridge; Dirk Starbuck; Victor Vega; Jeremy Ball
  - State senator: Monique Limón (D)
  - Assemblymember: Gregg Hart (D)
  - U.S. Rep.: Salud Carbajal (D)

Area
  - Total: 11.70 sq mi (30.31 km^{2})
  - Land: 11.62 sq mi (30.10 km^{2})
  - Water: 0.077 sq mi (0.20 km^{2}) 0.66%
- Elevation: 105 ft (32 m)

Population (2020)
  - Total: 44,444
  - Density: 3,824/sq mi (1,477/km^{2})
- Demonym: Lompocan
- Time zone: UTC−8 (PST)
  - Summer (DST): UTC−7 (PDT)
- ZIP Codes: 93436–93438
- Area code: 805
- FIPS code: 06-42524
- GNIS feature ID: 1652745
- Website: www.cityoflompoc.com

Lompoc (/ˈlɒmpoʊk/ LOM-poke; Chumashan Purisimeño: lumpo'o̥) is a city in Santa Barbara County, California, United States. Located on the Central Coast, its population was 43,834 as of July 2021.

Lompoc has been inhabited for thousands of years by the Chumash people, who called the area lumpo'o̥, meaning 'lagoon' in the local Purisimeño language. The Spanish called the area Lompoco after Fermín de Lasuén had established Misión La Purísima in 1787. In 1837, the Mexican government sold the area as the Rancho Lompoc land grant. After the U.S. conquest of California, multiple settlers acquired the Lompoc Valley, including William Welles Hollister, who sold the land around the mission to the Lompoc Valley Land Company, which established a temperance colony that incorporated in 1888 as Lompoc. Lompoc is often considered a military town because it is near Vandenberg Space Force Base.

== Etymology ==
It was once be believed that Lompoc meant "lake" or "stagnant waters", as first mentioned in Richard Applegate's 1974 paper Chumash Placenames.

In 1981 the writings of John P. Harrington were catalogued at the Smithsonian Museum and quoted Maria Solares with the correct translation. Linguists affiliated with the Western Institute for Endangered Language Documentation (WIELD) confirmed in 2018 the Chumash Purisimeño word lumpo'o̥ means 'in the cheeks'. Chumash place names were often adapted from human body parts, such as the eye, face, kneecap, eyelash, nose or shoulder.

== History ==
Mission La Purísima was founded in 1787 by the Spanish, under the leadership of Fermín de Lasuén.

Before the Spanish conquest, the area around Lompoc was inhabited by the Chumash people. The Original Mission La Purísima was established in 1787 near what is now the southern edge of the city. Purisimeño, a Chumashan language, was spoken in the region during the mission period. After an earthquake destroyed the mission in 1812, it was moved to its present location 1 mile (1.6 km) northeast of the present city. After independence from the Spanish Empire, the First Mexican Empire was established in 1821. The Mexicans secularized the Spanish missions in 1833, and La Purisima Mission fell into ruins.

In 1893, a diatomaceous earth mine, formerly owned by Johns Manville, World Mineral, and Celite corporation, now Imerys Inc., opened in the southern hills in Miguelito Canyon. It became (and still is) the largest marine diatomite mine in the world, and at one time was the largest employer in the valley. While owned by Johns Manville, the mine employed more than 900 people at its peak, and built housing for its employees onsite and in town; the houses in town are next to JM park, which the mine donated to the city. Another diatomaceous earth company, Grefco, operated here from the 1940s until 1998. The remnants of its mine at the northeast end of town were torn down in 2001.

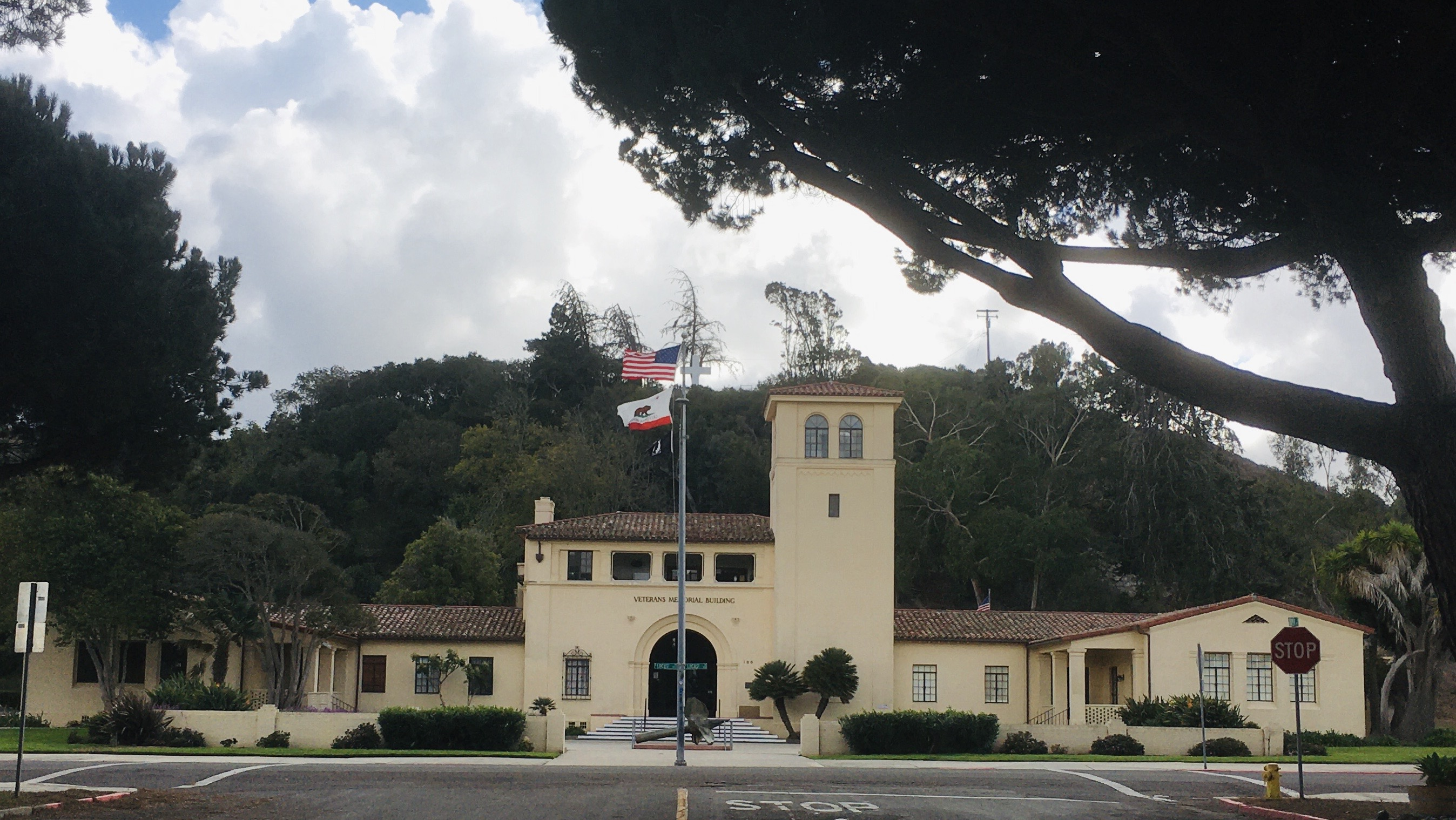
Lompoc Veterans Memorial Building, built in a Spanish Colonial Revival style in 1936, is a National Historic Landmark.

In 1909, the Sibyl Marston—at the time, the largest steam schooner built on the West Coast—sank nearby while carrying 1,100,000 board feet (2,600 m^{3}) of lumber. Many Lompoc homes were built with lumber from the shipwreck. The wreckage can still be seen south of Surf Beach.

The coastal branch of the Southern Pacific Railroad opened around 1900 and eventually replaced ship transportation. A paved road linked Lompoc to Buellton and the rest of California around 1920. In 1923, the Honda Point disaster, the U.S.'s largest peacetime naval accident, occurred just off the coast; nine U.S. destroyers ran aground, killing 23 people. During the Great Depression, La Purisima Mission was restored by the Civilian Conservation Corps (CCC). During World War II, the coast west of Lompoc was the site of Camp Cooke, a United States Army training camp where large units could practice maneuvers.

Ocean Ave in Lompoc, 1945

Lompoc grew slowly until 1958, when the United States Air Force announced that the former Camp Cooke would be a test site for the Thor family of intermediate-range ballistic missiles and the first operational base for the SM-65 Atlas, an intercontinental ballistic missile. The city then began to grow rapidly to provide housing for thousands of civilians and contractors employed at what was soon renamed Vandenberg Air Force Base. It was the Air Force's first missile base.

The Mission Revival style Lompoc Theatre was built in 1927.

The Space Shuttle program was slated to begin launches from Vandenberg in the late 1980s, and the city experienced a boom in restaurant and hotel construction in anticipation of tourists coming to see shuttle launches. But after the Challenger exploded during takeoff from Cape Canaveral in 1986, the West Coast shuttle program was terminated, sending Lompoc into a severe recession.

== Geography ==
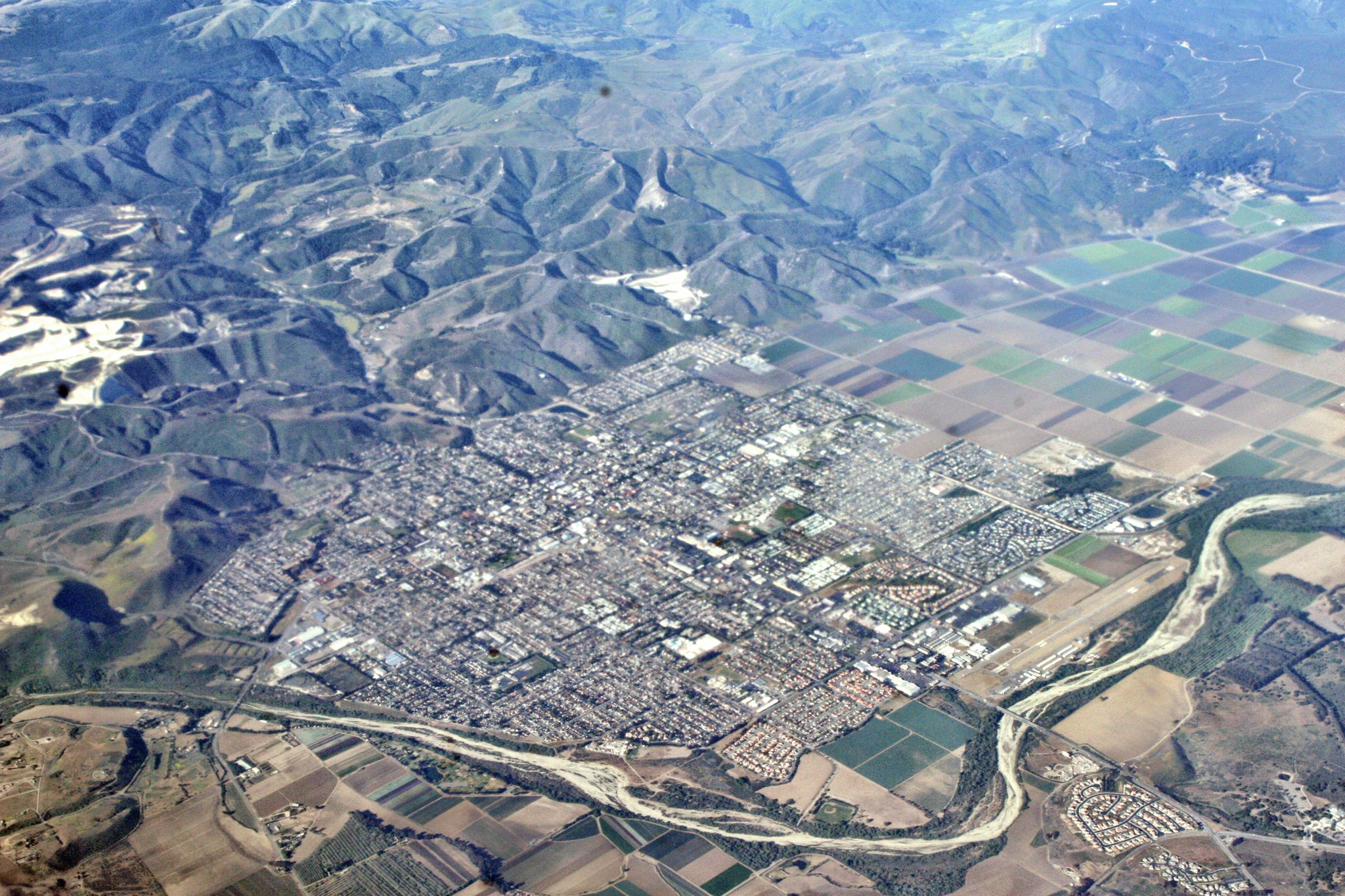
Aerial view of Lompoc in 2007, looking southwest. The Santa Ynez River flows at bottom of image.

According to the United States Census Bureau, the city has an area of 11.7 square miles (30 km^{2}), 99.34% land and 0.66% water.

Most of the city is in the valley of the Santa Ynez River, at an elevation of about 80–100 feet (25–30 meters). Expansion has been to the north, on higher ground known as Vandenberg Village, with elevations of 150–300 feet (50–100 meters). Like most rivers in Southern California, the Santa Ynez River has no surface flow most of the year. Underground flow in the sandy river bed recharges the aquifer beneath the city, from which nine wells (a tenth is planned) supply the city with water. Unlike many Southern California cities, Lompoc is not connected to the State Water Project.

=== Climate ===
Lompoc has a cool Mediterranean climate (Köppen climate classification Csb), typical of coastal California. The city is mostly sunny, with an ocean breeze. Fog is common. Snow is virtually unknown. The highest recorded temperature was 110 °F or 43.3 °C in 1987, and the lowest was 20 °F or −6.7 °C in 1990.

Climate data for Lompoc, California, 1991–2020 normals, extremes 1917–present
Month	Jan	Feb	Mar	Apr	May	Jun	Jul	Aug	Sep	Oct	Nov	Dec	Year
Record high °F (°C)	88 (31)	89 (32)	96 (36)	105 (41)	97 (36)	98 (37)	99 (37)	101 (38)	106 (41)	110 (43)	98 (37)	90 (32)	110 (43)
Mean maximum °F (°C)	78.6 (25.9)	80.1 (26.7)	82.0 (27.8)	85.1 (29.5)	83.3 (28.5)	83.9 (28.8)	82.9 (28.3)	85.1 (29.5)	89.9 (32.2)	91.6 (33.1)	85.2 (29.6)	76.7 (24.8)	95.1 (35.1)
Mean daily maximum °F (°C)	64.7 (18.2)	65.1 (18.4)	67.3 (19.6)	68.2 (20.1)	69.2 (20.7)	70.7 (21.5)	72.5 (22.5)	73.3 (22.9)	74.8 (23.8)	74.1 (23.4)	69.6 (20.9)	63.3 (17.4)	69.4 (20.8)
Daily mean °F (°C)	54.0 (12.2)	54.6 (12.6)	56.6 (13.7)	57.8 (14.3)	59.9 (15.5)	61.8 (16.6)	64.0 (17.8)	64.6 (18.1)	64.8 (18.2)	62.6 (17.0)	57.8 (14.3)	52.7 (11.5)	59.3 (15.2)
Mean daily minimum °F (°C)	43.2 (6.2)	44.2 (6.8)	46.0 (7.8)	47.4 (8.6)	50.6 (10.3)	52.9 (11.6)	55.5 (13.1)	56.0 (13.3)	54.9 (12.7)	51.1 (10.6)	46.0 (7.8)	42.1 (5.6)	49.2 (9.6)
Mean minimum °F (°C)	32.2 (0.1)	33.5 (0.8)	36.9 (2.7)	38.5 (3.6)	42.6 (5.9)	45.6 (7.6)	49.2 (9.6)	49.5 (9.7)	46.6 (8.1)	41.4 (5.2)	36.1 (2.3)	31.1 (−0.5)	29.9 (−1.2)
Record low °F (°C)	21 (−6)	26 (−3)	27 (−3)	29 (−2)	34 (1)	34 (1)	41 (5)	37 (3)	36 (2)	27 (−3)	24 (−4)	20 (−7)	20 (−7)
Average precipitation inches (mm)	3.29 (84)	3.66 (93)	2.80 (71)	0.90 (23)	0.34 (8.6)	0.06 (1.5)	0.02 (0.51)	0.01 (0.25)	0.05 (1.3)	0.67 (17)	1.21 (31)	2.40 (61)	15.41 (392.16)
Average precipitation days (≥ 0.01 in)	8.1	8.6	7.4	4.1	1.7	0.6	0.6	0.3	0.7	2.7	4.7	7.7	47.2
Source 1: NOAA
Source 2: National Weather Service

== Demographics ==
Historical population
Census	Pop.	Note	%±
1880	226		—
1890	1,015		349.1%
1900	972		−4.2%
1910	1,482		52.5%
1920	1,876		26.6%
1930	2,845		51.7%
1940	3,379		18.8%
1950	5,520		63.4%
1960	14,415		161.1%
1970	25,284		75.4%
1980	26,267		3.9%
1990	37,649		43.3%
2000	41,103		9.2%
2010	42,434		3.2%
2020	44,444		4.7%
U.S. Decennial Census; 1860–1870 1880-1890; 1900 1910 1920; 1930 1940 1950; 1960 1970 1980; 1990 2000 2010; 2020

=== 2020 census ===
As of the 2020 census, Lompoc had a population of 44,444 and a population density of 3,823.8 inhabitants per square mile (1,476.1/km2). The median age was 35.7 years. 24.7% of residents were under the age of 18 and 13.2% were 65 years of age or older. For every 100 females, there were 109.9 males, and for every 100 females age 18 and over, there were 111.6 males.

The Census reported that 41,375 people (93.0%) lived in households, 156 (0.35%) lived in non-institutionalized group quarters, and 2,913 (6.5%) were institutionalized. 99.6% of residents lived in urban areas, while 0.4% lived in rural areas.

There were 14,104 households, of which 38.7% had children under the age of 18 living in them. Of all households, 44.7% were married-couple households, 27.8% had a female householder with no spouse or partner present, and 18.5% had a male householder with no spouse or partner present. There were 1,210 unmarried opposite-sex partner households and 77 same-sex married-couple or partner households. About 23.0% of all households were made up of individuals and 10.2% had someone living alone who was 65 years of age or older. The average household size was 3.06; there were 9,453 families (67.0% of all households), and the average family size was 3.67.

There were 14,609 housing units at an average density of 1,257 per square mile (485/km2), with 505 vacant units (3.5%). Of occupied units, 6,687 (45.7%) were owner-occupied and 7,417 (50.7%) were renter-occupied. The homeowner vacancy rate was 0.4% and the rental vacancy rate was 3.1%.

Racial composition as of the 2020 census
Race	Number	Percent
White	18,848	42.4%
Black or African American	2,007	4.5%
American Indian and Alaska Native	1,147	2.6%
Asian	1,756	4.0%
Native Hawaiian and Other Pacific Islander	112	0.3%
Some other race	11,268	25.4%
Two or more races	9,306	20.9%
Hispanic or Latino (of any race)	25,472	57.3%

=== 2010 census ===
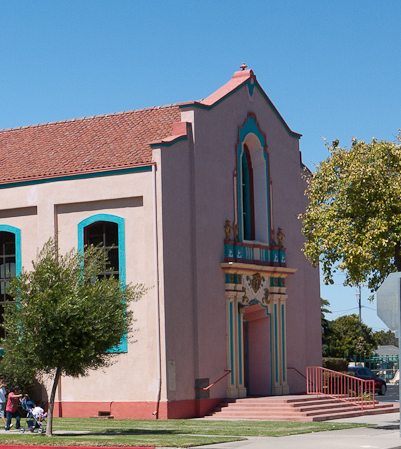
La Purísima Concepción Catholic Church, built in 1920 in a Spanish Colonial Revival style.

In the 2010 United States census, Lompoc had a population of 42,434. The population density was 3,634.7 inhabitants per square mile (1,403.4/km^{2}). The racial makeup was 25,950 (61.2%) White; 2,432 (5.7%) African American; 750 (1.8%) Native American; 1,615 (3.8%) Asian; 186 (0.4%) Pacific Islander; 9,020 (21.3%) from other races; and 2,481 (5.8%) from two or more races. There were 21,557 Hispanic or Latino residents of any race (50.8%).

The Census reported that 38,778 people (91.4% of the population) lived in households, 99 (0.2%) lived in non-institutionalized group quarters, and 3,557 (8.4%) were institutionalized.

There were 13,355 households, of which 5,481 (41.0%) had children under the age of 18 living in them; 6,323 (47.3%) were opposite-sex married couples living together; 2,061 (15.4%) had a female householder with no husband present; and 913 (6.8%) had a male householder with no wife present. There were 949 (2.2%) unmarried opposite-sex partnerships and 75 (0.17%) same-sex married couples or partnerships. 3,304 households (24.7%) were made up of individuals, and 1,187 (8.9%) had someone living alone who was 65 years of age or older. The average household size was 2.9. There were 9,297 families (69.6% of all households); the average family size was 3.48.

The population included 11,188 people (26.4%) under the age of 18, 4,452 people (10.5%) aged 18 to 24, 12,233 people (28.8%) aged 25 to 44, 10,338 people (24.4%) aged 45 to 64, and 4,223 people (10.0%) who were 65 or older. The median age was 33.9 years. For every 100 females, there were 114.9 males. For every 100 females age 18 and over, there were 118.7 males.

There were 14,416 housing units at an average density of 1,234.8 per square mile (476.8/km^{2}), of which 6,493 (48.6%) were owner-occupied and 6,862 (51.4%) were occupied by renters. The homeowner vacancy rate was 2.2%; the rental vacancy rate was 7.1%. 18,534 people (43.7% of the population) lived in owner-occupied housing units, and 20,244 people (47.7%) lived in rental housing units.

=== 2000 census ===
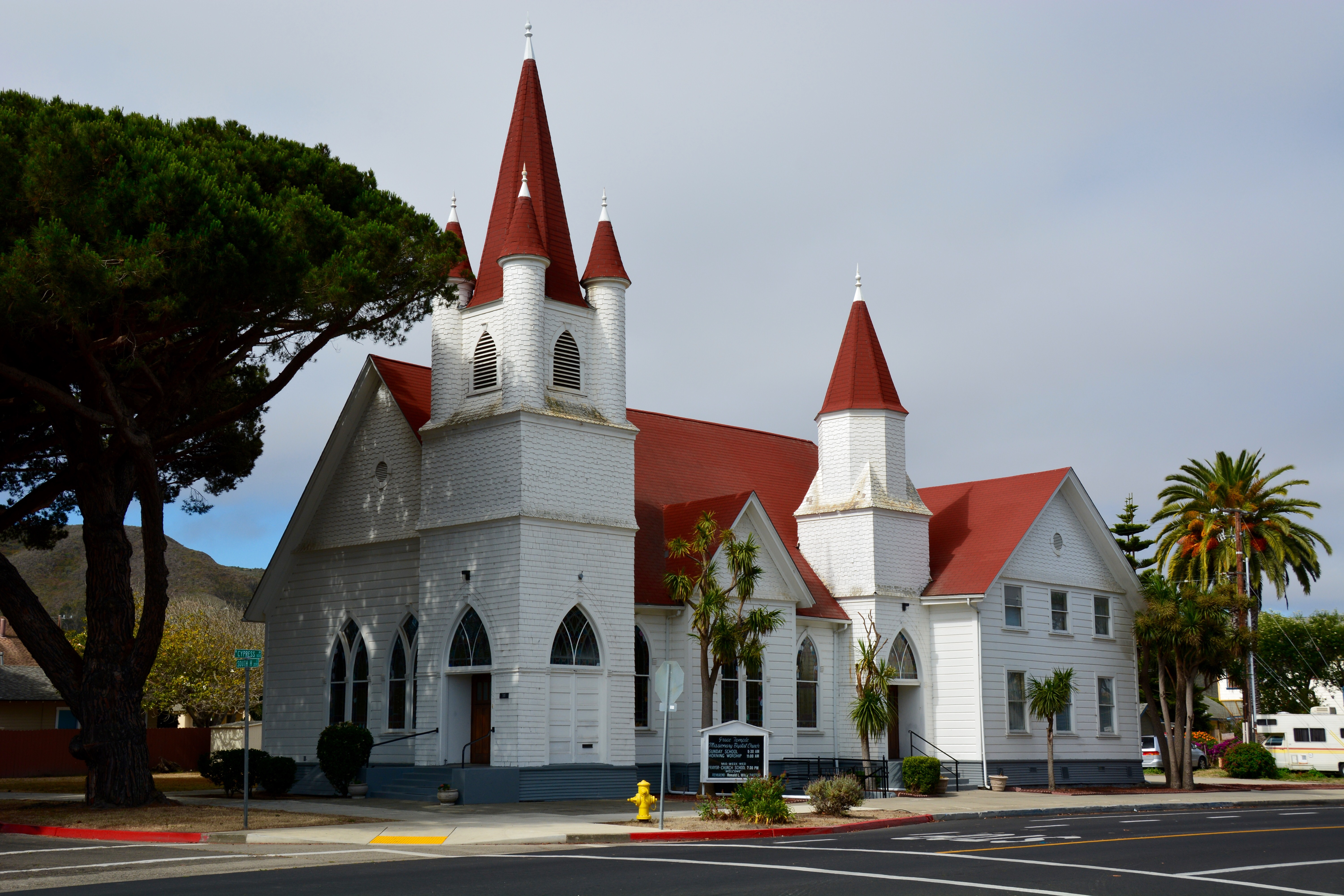
Temple Baptist Church was originally built as two churches in the 1870s, which were unified in 1908.

As of the 2000 Census, there were 43,284 people, 13,059 households and 9,311 families residing in Lompoc. The population density was 3,532.2 inhabitants per square mile (1,363.8/km^{2}). There were 13,621 housing units at an average density of 1,170.5 per square mile (451.9/km^{2}). The racial makeup of the city was 65.81% White, 7.34% African American, 1.58% Native American, 3.90% Asian, 0.32% Pacific Islander, 15.68% from other races, and 5.35% from two or more races. Hispanic or Latino residents of any race made up 37.31% of the population.

There were 13,059 households, of which 41.1% had children under the age of 18 living with them, 51.0% were married couples living together, 14.8% had a female householder with no husband present, and 28.7% were non-families. 23.5% of all households were made up of individuals, and 8.3% had someone living alone who was 65 or older. The average household size was 2.88, and the average family size was 3.42.

The population included 29.9% under the age of 18, 8.9% from 18 to 24, 33.3% from 25 to 44, 18.5% from 45 to 64, and 9.4% who were 65 or older. The median age was 32. For every 100 females, there were 113.0 males. For every 100 females age 18 and over, there were 116.4 males.

The median income for a household in the city was $47,587, and the median income for a family was $62,199. Males had a median income of $35,074, versus $26,824 for females. The per capita income was $15,509. About 12.6% of families and 15.4% of the population were below the poverty line, including 20.8% of those under 18 and 6.7% of those 65 or older.

== Economy ==
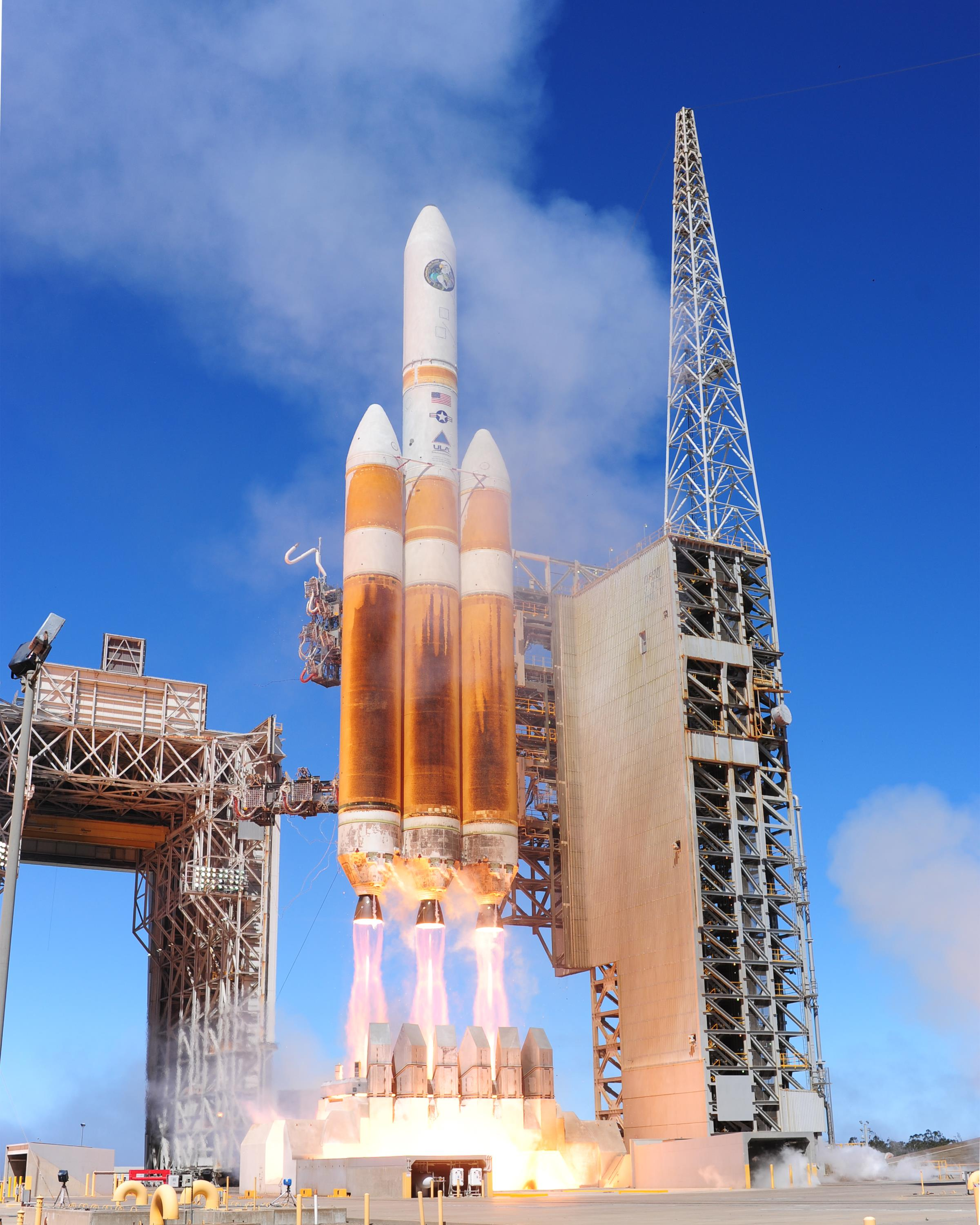
Vandenberg Space Force Base is a large contributor to the local economy.

Vandenberg Space Force Base dominates the economy, directly employing more Lompoc residents than any other employer and contributing $1.7 billion to the regional economy. Other mainstays of the economy include the Federal Correctional Institution, the diatomaceous earth mine (today owned by Imerys), the Lompoc Oil Field and associated oil processing facilities north of town, and agriculture (especially seed flowers and vegetables). Lompoc is called "The City of Arts and Flowers".

Wine production and wine tourism make up an expanding agricultural sector. Lompoc Valley is the gateway to the Sta. Rita Hills AVA wine appellation, internationally recognized for premium pinot noir and chardonnay. Thirty premium boutique wine labels are produced in Lompoc. Numerous other wineries are along State Route 246 and on Santa Rosa Road. Tasting rooms are in various parts of Lompoc.

Since the end of the Cold War, many workers employed in Santa Barbara and Goleta have moved to Lompoc to take advantage of lower housing costs, effectively making it a bedroom community of Santa Barbara. The town's character has changed considerably with the growth associated with this demographic shift. In addition, new housing developments are spreading into the adjacent hills on the north side of town.

=== Cannabis ===
Upon the legalization of the sale and distribution of cannabis in California, the city had seven recreational marijuana storefronts by February 2020, with 19 cannabis business licenses having been issued by the city. One of the retail establishments being licensed for onsite consumption claims to be the first between Los Angeles and San Francisco. A manufacturing facility has been established and a testing lab provides the required analysis for growers. Companies must be licensed by the local agency and the state to grow, test, or sell cannabis and the city may authorize none or only some of these activities. Cannabis dispensaries pay a 6% gross sales tax to the city. Local governments may not prohibit adults who are in compliance with state laws from growing, using, or transporting cannabis for personal use.

== Government ==
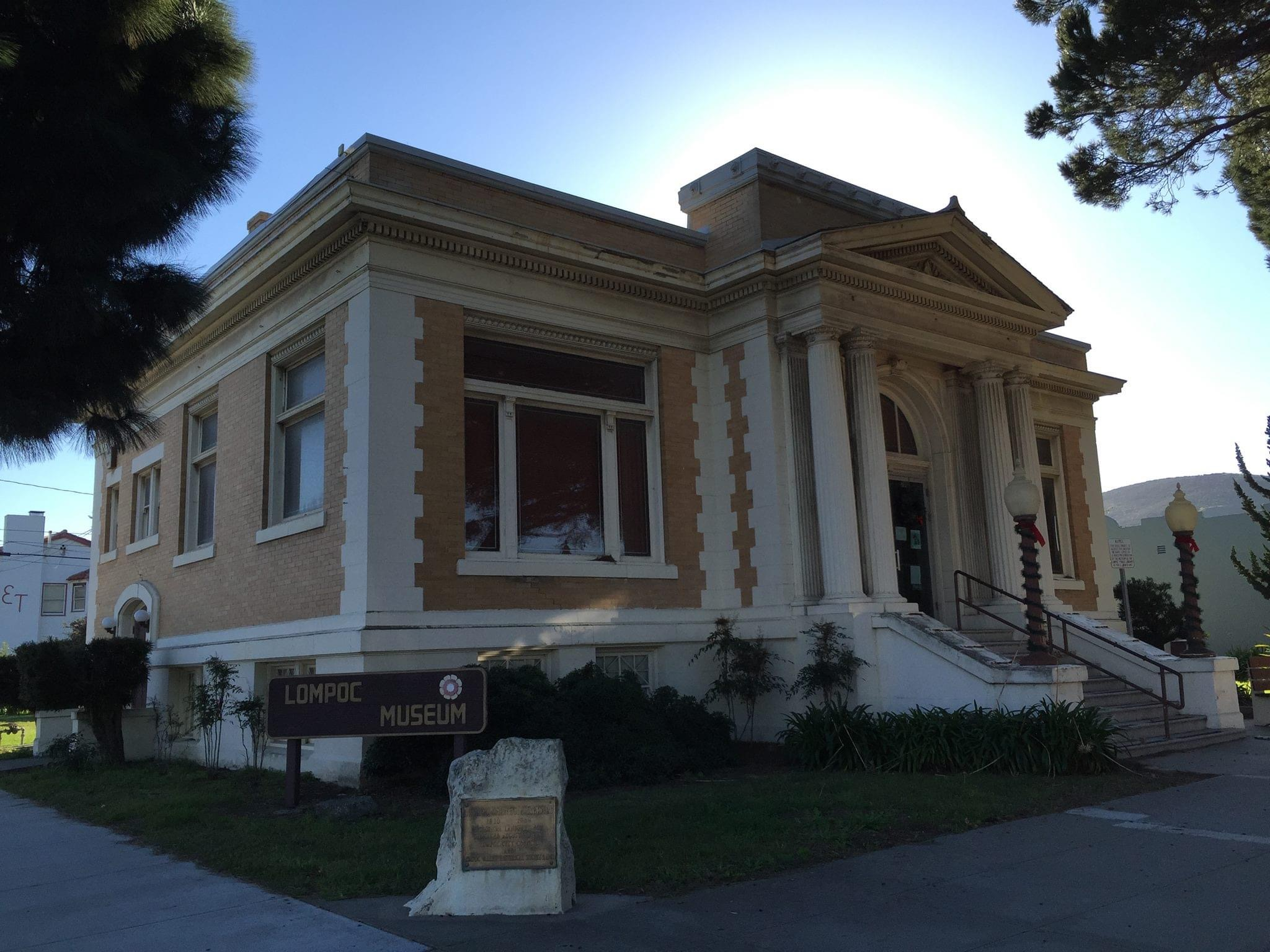
The Lompoc Museum is housed in the old Carnegie library, built in 1910.

=== Public safety ===
The Lompoc Police Department is the city's primary law enforcement agency. The city is also served by the Lompoc Fire Department (LFD), which responds to more than 3,800 emergency and non-emergency calls per year.

American Medical Response Santa Barbara County (AMR SBC) provides the primary emergency medical response and ambulance services. The LFD provides mutual aid to the Santa Barbara County Fire Department as well as primary fire protection and emergency medical response to the United States Penitentiary, Lompoc.

The Federal Correctional Complex between Lompoc and Vandenberg SFB includes the medium- and low-security Federal Correctional Institution, Lompoc, two minimum-security camps.

== Education ==
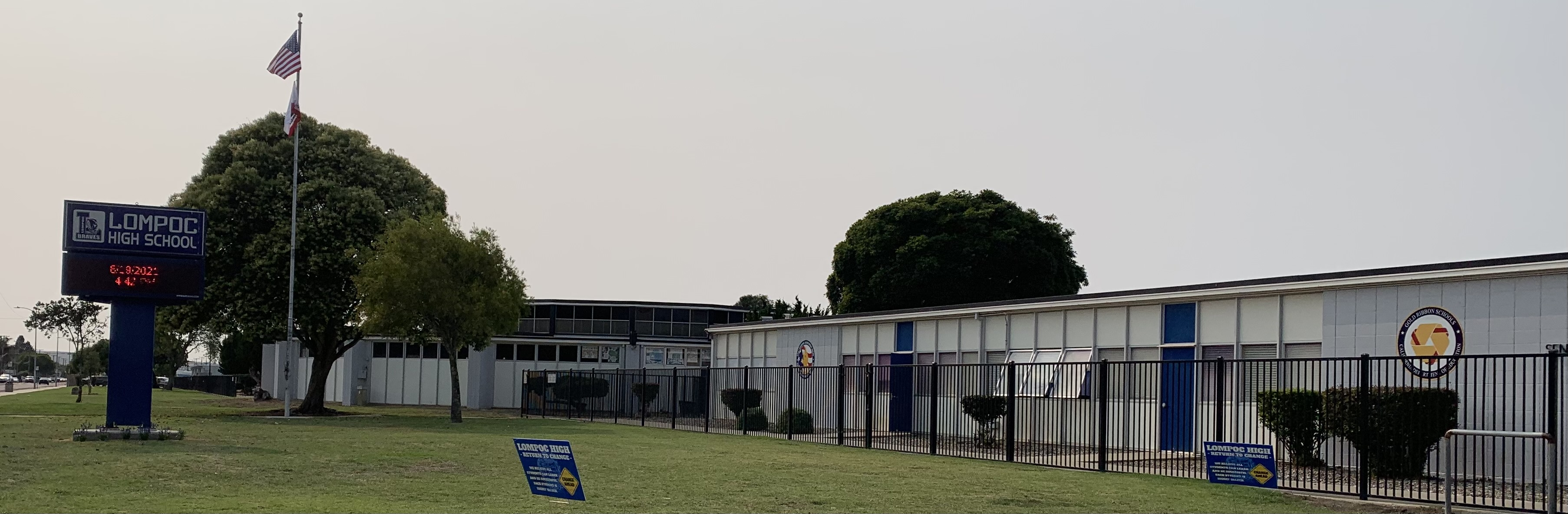
Lompoc High School.

Lompoc is served by the Lompoc Unified School District.

The two high schools in the area are Cabrillo High School and Lompoc High School.

The two middle schools in the area are Vandenberg Middle School and Lompoc Valley Middle School.

Allan Hancock College operates the Lompoc Valley Center (LVC).

== Transportation ==
State Route 1 is the major north–south artery through Lompoc. State Route 246 heads east to Buellton and the Santa Ynez Valley.

The Surf train station is located to the west at Surf Beach and is served by Amtrak's Pacific Surfliner line. Amtrak Thruway buses stop in town. Lompoc is also served by City of Lompoc Transit, the Clean Air Express to Santa Barbara/Goleta, and the Breeze Bus to Buellton/Solvang and Santa Maria.

The Lompoc Airport is located on the northern end of the city, adjacent to the south bank of the Santa Ynez River, and provides general aviation facilities for the area.

== Culture ==
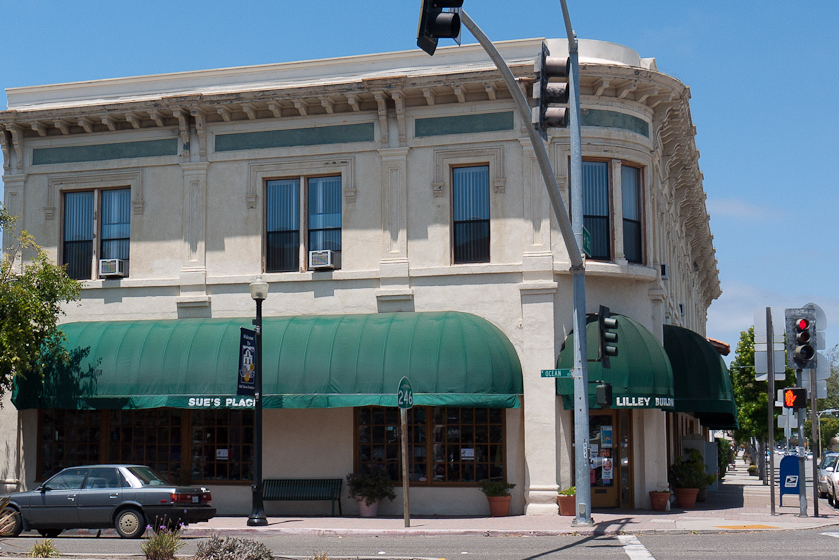
The Lilley Building in downtown Lompoc, built in 1875.

The Lompoc Valley Flower Festival, held the last week of June, features a parade, carnival, food vendors, and craft show. In 2002, the Bodger Seed Company planted a "floral flag" as a tribute after the September 11 attacks. The "flag" was 740 feet by 390 feet, covered 6.65 acres (2.69 ha), and was estimated to contain more than 400,000 larkspur plants.

The Lompoc arts scene features artists, musicians, and bands ranging from singer-songwriters to psychedelic blues-rock bands. At the center of this scene is Certain Sparks Music, a music store and frequent venue for Lompoc's musicians. Certain Sparks opened in 2006 and moved in 2015 from the corner of H & Laurel to South H Street.

=== Local artists ===
Altar at Mission La Purísima.

One of Lompoc's most successful musical artists is the rock band Saint Anne's Place, which formed in 2008 and released its first EP, Speak Easy, in 2011. The band's music has been called a "blistering yet rustic mix of blues, psychedelia, and folk rock with the chops of players twice their senior". In 2011, it won the Santa Barbara Independent battle of the bands. It released its second EP, The Earth Shaker, in 2012.

Contemporary artwork on display at Mission La Purísima.

Emily Wryn is a Lompoc songwriter whose music has been featured on NPR’s Morning Becomes Eclectic. Their first EP, Head on Straight, was released in 2012, and they played at the Indie Week festival in Ireland in 2014. Wryn also collaborates with Saint Anne's Place and a group called The Lights Electric.

Another band, Millions, led by Randall Sena, played along the Central Coast. Sena was also in a performing band called Le Petite Protest. He recorded and produced Wryn's Head on Straight and Saint Anne's Place's Speak Easy in his recording studio, Certain Sparks.

=== Lompoc Theatre ===
The Lompoc Theatre, which opened in 1927, was owned and operated by the Calvert family for many years. It encountered financial trouble in the 1970s because of competition from multiplexes and television. The last time a movie was shown on its screen was in 1987.

In 2003, a nonprofit group, the Lompoc Housing and Community Development Corporation, announced plans to restore the theater. With the city's assistance, the LHCDC raised funds to buy the theater. By 2008, the cost of renovating the building was estimated at just under $10 million. The LHCDC could not raise the money needed for renovations, and the building accumulated three liens. The Lompoc Theatre Project Organization formed in 2012 with the help of Howlin' Byroon's Music Store owner Brian W. Cole, Donelle Martin, Carol Benham, Michelle Shaefer, and others. It was formally sold to the grassroots group the Lompoc Theatre Project in 2016. As of January 2020, restoration and fund-raising is ongoing.

=== Lompoc Pops Orchestra ===
Founded in 1996, the Lompoc Pops Orchestra consists of about 45 semi-professional musicians under the direction of Brian Asher Alhadeff. Its four annual performances include musicals, Broadway hits, jazz pieces, big band, gospel, and patriotic music.

== Notable people ==
- Julián Araujo, professional soccer player (AFC Bournemouth, Mexico national team)
- Jeff Bettendorf, professional baseball player (Oakland Athletics)
- Mike Bratz, former professional basketball player (San Antonio Spurs, Cleveland Cavaliers, Chicago Bulls, Golden State Warriors, Sacramento Kings, Phoenix Suns)
- Casey Candaele, former professional baseball player (Montreal Expos, Houston Astros, and Cleveland Indians)
- Ryan Church, former professional baseball player (Washington Nationals, New York Mets, Atlanta Braves, Pittsburgh Pirates, and Arizona Diamondbacks)
- Jeffrey Combs, actor, raised in Lompoc
- Gunther Cunningham, assistant head coach-linebackers for NFL's Tennessee Titans; former head coach of Kansas City Chiefs
- Danny Duffy, professional baseball player (Kansas City Royals)
- Jacqueline Gadsden, 1920s film actress, born in Lompoc
- Brian Givens, former professional baseball player (Milwaukee Brewers)
- Johnnie Gray, former professional football player (Green Bay Packers)
- Mark Herrier, actor, graduated from Lompoc High School
- Winifred Hervey, executive producer and writer, The Fresh Prince of Bel-Air and The Steve Harvey Show
- Roy Howell, former professional baseball player (Texas Rangers, Toronto Blue Jays, and Milwaukee Brewers)
- Bill Howerton, former professional baseball player (St. Louis Cardinals, Pittsburgh Pirates, and New York Giants)
- Napoleon Kaufman, former professional football player (Oakland Raiders)
- Gabe Lopez, singer/songwriter
- Jonathan Majors, actor, born in Lompoc
- John D. Nesbitt, western writer and American literature and language educator living in Wyoming
- George Perry, Alzheimer's disease researcher and dean and professor of biology at the University of Texas at San Antonio
- Duane Solomon, 800m Olympian
- Roy Thomas, former professional baseball player (Seattle Mariners)
- Tommy Thompson, former professional football player (San Francisco 49ers)
- Dorien Wilson, actor, The Parkers and Dream On
- Lompoc Jane Doe, a homicide victim from 1969, inspiration behind Sue Grafton's novel "Q" Is for Quarry

== Sister cities ==
Lompoc has five sister cities:

- (United States) Cheyenne, Wyoming
- Inca, Spain
- (United States) Lake Placid, Florida
- Locarno, Switzerland
- Namwon, Republic of Korea (South Korea)

== In popular culture ==
In 2010, Playboy named Jasper's, a local bar, one of the top 10 dive bars in the country. The bar is the setting of the classic 1940 W. C. Fields comedy The Bank Dick. Lompoc is also frequently referred to in the TV cartoon series Roger Ramjet, though consistently mispronounced "Lom-pock". The Australian punk rock band Lompoc County Splatterheads were named from an episode where the hero refers to "local louts as a bunch of 'Splatter heads'." In Call of Duty: Ghosts, Lompoc is the setting of the Extinction map "Exodus". Sue Grafton's novel "Q" Is for Quarry takes place in Lompoc, inspired by the real-life case of the Lompoc Jane Doe.

== See also ==
- Federal Correctional Institution, Lompoc
- Vandenberg Space Force Base
