= John D. Nesbitt =

American educator and writer (born 1948)

- Born: December 14, 1948 (age 77); Lompoc, California, U.S.
- Education: University of California, Los Angeles University of California, Davis Instituto de Filología Hispánica
- Occupation: Writer • professor
- Years active: 1978–present
- Known for: Western • retro/noir fiction • non-fiction • western poetry • song lyrics
- Website: http://johndnesbitt.com

John Dunville Nesbitt (born December 14, 1948) is an American educator and writer of Northern Irish and Hungarian descent, known for his fiction, non-fiction, poetry, and song lyrics about the American West. He is best known for his traditional western novels, and has also published in retro/noir fiction set in California, memoirs set in California, contemporary fiction set in Wyoming, and poetry set in the West. His work is noted for its realism, sense of place, characterization, prose style, and blending of popular and literary styles

Nesbitt was a professor of English and Spanish at Eastern Wyoming College, having earned degrees from the University of California, Los Angeles, and the University of California, Davis. He is now Professor Emeritus. His recognitions include a Wyoming Arts Council Literary Fellowship for fiction in 1988 and for nonfiction in 2008; the Western Writers of America Spur Award for original paperback novel in 2009 and 2010, short story in 2010, and poem in 2019; the Western Fictioneers Peacemaker Award for Best Western Novel in 2021 and Best Short Fiction in 2020, and the Orland Alumni Association distinguished alumni award in 2019 for his achievements in writing.

== Early life ==
Nesbitt was born in Lompoc, California, in Santa Barbara County. His father was a farmer and rancher, and his mother was an aspiring writer and artist. When he was about a year old, his father and his grandfather sold out their interests in California and bought a ranch in eastern Oregon. Citing economic troubles, the family moved back to California, where Nesbitt's parents divorced, and his father ended up with custody of Nesbitt and his three brothers. In 1956, shortly before Nesbitt's eighth birthday, he learned that his mother had died. When Nesbitt and his brothers were old enough to work in the fields, they and their father followed the seasonal agricultural work and lived in and near several small towns across California.

=== Education ===
Nesbitt attended Orland High School in Orland, California, where he was a top student in mathematics and graduated with honors in foreign languages. He attended Chico State College, majoring in mathematics, but changed to English, out of a desire to become a published author. After three semesters at Chico State, he transferred to the University of California, Los Angeles, where he studied French and Spanish, and graduated in English in 1971. Nesbitt earned a M.A. (1974) and a PhD (1980) in English from the University of California, Davis, where he wrote his dissertation on the western novel.

Notably in 1994, Nesbitt earned a degree in Spanish Philology from the Instituto de Filología Hispánica in Saltillo, Coahuila.

== Career ==
Nesbitt worked as a teaching assistant and, later, a lecturer at the University of California, Davis, from 1972 to 1981. During this time, he also worked as a lecturer at the University of California, Santa Barbara, and as an adjunct professor of English at California State University, Sacramento, Solano Community College, and Yuba College. Nesbitt joined the faculty at Eastern Wyoming College in 1981, and taught several courses in English and Spanish within the division of Arts, Humanities, and Social and Behavioral Sciences. He took full retirement in 2021 and is now Professor Emeritus.

Professionally, Nesbitt has participated in the leadership of national and regional organizations for writing, literature, and western Americana. Most notably, Nesbitt served as president of Wyoming Writers, Inc., (2010–2011), president of WyoPoets (1996–1997), and as board member for Western Writers of America (2008–2010).

=== Writing ===
In 1978, Nesbitt first piece, a short-story called "West of Dancing Rock," was published in the commercial magazine Far West. Between 1978 and 1994, several of Nesbitt's short fiction, academic articles, nonfiction, and poetry were published in a variety of academic journals, literary magazines, and commercial magazines.

Nesbitt's first book, One-Eyed Cowboy Wild, was published as a hardcover western with Walker and Company in New York City in 1994. After three novels with Walker and Company, he moved into paperback original western novels for several years, and later returned to hardcover publishing with Five Star. Since the publication of his first novel, he has published several short story collections, contemporary novels, nonfiction works, poems, and song lyrics. Nesbitt's work has been commended for its realism, descriptive settings, development of characters, and unique blend of genres, such as his works in frontier fiction and niche noir fiction.

== Personal life ==
Nesbitt is married to Rocío Nesbitt, a Mexican native, and lives and teaches at Eastern Wyoming College in Torrington, Wyoming.

Nesbitt has expressed (in his memoir Boy from the Country and elsewhere) that his career has given him the stability he yearned for in his youth, and has allowed him to pursue the western way of life by living in the country, having horses, hunting, camping, and getting to know the land and its wildlife. He also noted that the migrant way of life of his youth in California had a great effect on his career aspirations and on his writing.

== Awards ==
In 1988, he was awarded an Independent Research Fellowship from the Wyoming Council for the Humanities. In 1994, he was recognized with the Excellence Award in Teaching by the National Institute for Staff and Organizational Development (NISOD). Nesbitt has been honored locally through Wyoming Writers, Inc., with the Arizola Magnenat Award for Dedicated Encouragement of Other Writers in 1999, and the Emmie Mygatt Award for Dedicated Service to the Organization in 2000. In 2016, he was Faculty Member of the Year for Eastern Wyoming College, and was recognized by the Orland High School Alumni Association as Co-Alumnus of the Year for 2018.

Artistically, Nesbitt's novels, short stories, and poems have been recognized on a regional and national level, through organizations like the Wyoming Historical Society and Western Writers of America.

Literary Awards
Year	Award	Organization	Work
1999	Fiction Award (Book)	Wyoming Historical Society	Keep the Wind in Your Face
2001	Fiction Award (Book)	Wyoming Historical Society	North of Cheyenne
2009	Spur Award in Best Original Mass Market Paperback	Western Writers of America	Trouble at the Redstone
2010	Spur Award in Best Original Mass Market Paperback	Western Writers of America	Stranger in Thunder Basin
2010	Spur Award in Best Western Short Fiction Story	Western Writers of America	"At the End of the Orchard"
2019	Fiction Award (Book)	Wyoming Historical Society	Castle Butte
2019	Spur Award in Best Western Poem	Western Writers of America	"Prairie Center"
2020	Best Short Fiction	Western Fictioneers	"Leaving the Lariat Trail"
2021	Best Western Novel	Western Fictioneers	Great Lonesome
2021	Fiction Award (Book)	Wyoming Historical Society	Great Lonesome

Nesbitt was also awarded a Creative Writing Fellowship for fiction and nonfiction from the Wyoming Arts Council in 1988 and 2008, respectively.

== Bibliography ==
=== Western novels ===
- One-Eyed Cowboy Wild (1994)
- Twin Rivers (1995)
- Wild Rose of Ruby Canyon (1997)
- Black Diamond Rendezvous (1998)
- Coyote Trail (2000)
- North of Cheyenne (2000)
- Man from Wolf River (2001)
- For the Norden Boys (2002)
- Black Hat Butte (2003)
- Red Wind Crossing (2003)
- West of Rock River (2004)
- Ranco Alegre (2005)
- Lonesome Range (2006)
- Raven Springs (2007)
- Death at Dark Water (2008)
- Trouble at the Redstone (2008)
- Stranger in Thunder Basin (2009)
- Not a Rustler (2010)
- Gather My Horses (2011)
- Dark Prairie (2013)
- Across the Cheyenne River (2014)
- Don't Be a Stranger (2015)
- Justice at Redwillow (2015)
- Death in Cantera (2016)
- Good Water (2016)
- Destiny at Dry Camp (2017)
- Castle Butte (2018)
- Dusk Along the Niobrara (2019)
- Great Lonesome (2020)
- Silver Grass (2021)
- Double Deceit (2021)
- Coldwater Range (2022)
- Diamonds and Doom (2023)
- Rose of Greenwood (2023)
- Summer's Lease (2024)
- Riders of the Skull (2024)
- Lost Canyon (2025)

==== Western fiction collections ====
- One Foot in the Stirrup: Western Stories (1995, 1997)
- Adventures of the Ramrod Rider: Gripping Tales, Augmented and Revised by the Author (1999)
- Blue Horse Mesa: Western Stories (2012)
- John D. Nesbitt Western Double (2019)
- Dangerous Trails (2020)
- Bright Skies and Dark Horses (2023)
- Under Heaven's Own Blue (2024)

=== Retro/Noir fiction ===
- Seasons in the Fields: Stories of a Golden West (1998, 2017)
- Two Novellas (2012)
- Field Work (2012)

=== Contemporary fiction ===
==== Novels ====
- Keep the Wind in Your Face (1998)
- A Good Man to Have in Camp (1999)
- Poacher's Moon (2008)
- Blue Springs (2017)

==== Fiction collections ====
- Antelope Sky: Stories of the Modern West (1997)
- Shadows on the Plain (2005)

=== Nonfiction ===
- Robert Roripaugh (2004)
- Blue Book of Basic Writing (1996, 1999, 2004)
- Done by Friday (2010)
- Writing for Real (2000, 2007, 2013, 2020)
- Understanding Fiction (2011, 2020)
- Shaping the Story (2019)
- Boy from the Country (2024)

=== Poetry and song lyrics ===
- Thorns on the Rose: Western Poetry (2013, 2019)
- "Prairie Center," Saddlebag Dispatches (2018)
- "Rangeland Lament," Desert Rose (2018), recorded by western singer/songwriter Carol Markstrom.
- In a Large and Lonesome Land (2018), recorded by western singer-songwriter W.C. Jameson.
- Trails and Crossings (2022), recorded by Nesbitt.
