= Sibyl Marston (ship) =

Wooden schooner, sank off the California coast in 1909

Coordinates: 34.653474°N 120.61747°W

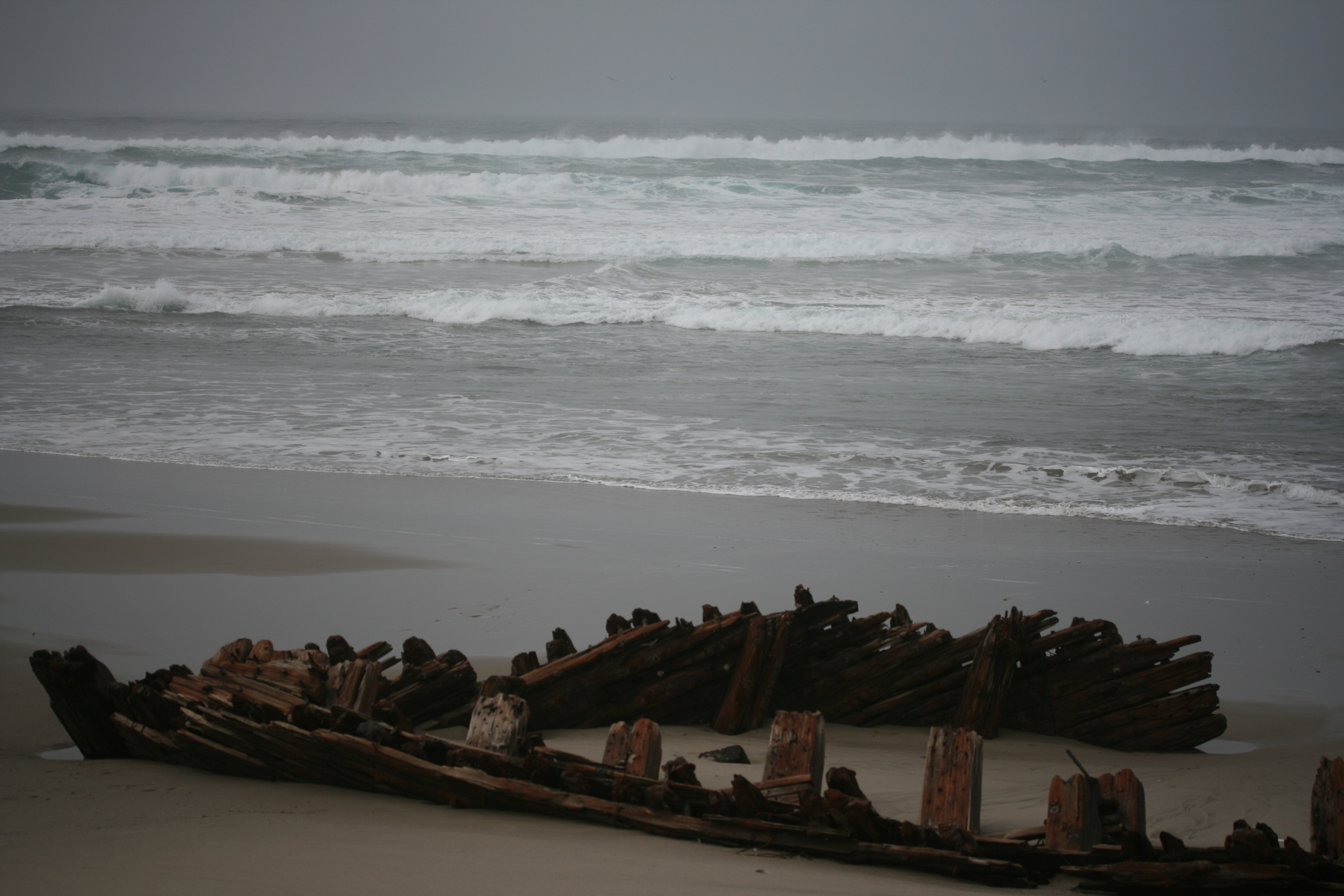
- Sibyl Marston as of 24 February 2010.

History
- Owner: Sibyl Marston Co.
- Builder: W. A. Boole & Son
- Launched: 29 June 1907
- Fate: Sank 12 January 1909

General characteristics
- Tonnage: 1,020 GRT (est.)
- Length: 215 ft (66 m)
- Propulsion: 800hp oil burning triple expansion

Sibyl Marston was a wooden schooner cargo ship built by W. A. Boole & Son of Oakland, California and belonging to the Sibyl Marston Co. Sibyl Marston sank off the coast of Lompoc, California on 12 January 1909.

== Overview ==
On 12 January 1909, Sybil Marston, the largest steam schooner built on the West Coast of the United States, struck the rocks near Surf Beach, California and ran aground in a storm. She was carrying 1,100,000 board feet (3,000 m^{3}) of lumber. Two crew members were killed in the disaster.

Shortly after the Sybil Marston disaster, Lompoc residents salvaged the lumber and used it to begin a town lumberyard. Several houses built in Lompoc used lumber from the shipwreck.

Surf Beach and its adjoining coastal area was a dangerous place for ship travel in the time before radar navigational systems made seafaring safer. There are about 30 recorded shipwrecks along the Surf Beach coast.

== Location ==
The shipwreck is located 1 mile (2 km) south of the Surf Amtrak Station in Lompoc.

== Sources ==
- "19th Century Shipbuilders on the Pacific Coast". Shipbuilding History.
