= Lompoc Fire Department =

Fire department in Lompoc, California, United States

Operational area
- Country: United States
- State: California
- City: Lompoc

Agency overview
- Established: 1875
- Annual calls: 5,297 (2022)
- Employees: 30
- Annual budget: $7,868,460 (2021-2022) $7,582.757 (2022-2023)
- Staffing: Career
- Fire chief: Brian Fallon
- EMS level: Basic Life Support
- IAFF: 1906

Facilities and equipment
- Divisions: 3
- Battalions: 1
- Stations: 2
- Engines: 2 - Type 1 frontline 2 - Type 1 reserve
- Rescues: 1 - frontline 1 - reserve
- USAR: 1 - Type: Medium
- Wildland: 1 - Type 3

Website
- Official website
- Lompoc Firefighters Association

The Lompoc Fire Department (LFD) provides fire protection and emergency medical services for Lompoc, California. The department's primary response area is approximately 12 square miles (31 km^{2}) and includes the United States Penitentiary, Lompoc.

== Mission statement ==
The Lompoc Fire Department is dedicated to serving the community of Lompoc by providing the highest level of emergency/rescue services, hazard prevention, and safety education, ensuring the protection of life, property and environment. Above all else, we realize that we are here to meet the needs of the public. We conduct ourselves at all times in a manner befitting the oath we swore to uphold, and treat others as they desire to be treated.

== History ==
According to the Lompoc Journal archives (now Lompoc Record), the first organized fire protection in the Lompoc colony was formed on August 31, 1875. The first "Fire Company or Hook and Ladder Company" was an all volunteer fire brigade organized 13 years before Lompoc became a city. H.R. Fabing was elected foreman of the Fire Company, making him Lompoc's first unofficial fire chief.

During this era, volunteer firefighters were alerted to the presence of a fire with the use of a large fire bell that rang. Firefighters would then report to the fire station and pick up the necessary equipment before heading to the emergency. Firefighters used buckets of waters to extinguish the fire since mechanical firefighting equipment wasn't in heavy use yet. In 1893, a new and much larger fire bell was purchased from the W.T. Garatt & Company. The bell still resides outside of Fire Station 1 as a remembrance of the department's history.

On October 4, 1888, the Town of Lompoc's board of trustees approved Ordinance No. 16, defining the "Fire Limits of the Town of Lompoc to Protect LIfe and Property from Fire and Fixing the Penalty for Non-Observance Thereof." The town's marshal was entrusted to enforce the ordinance since the existing fire company was a private entity.

In 1891 money was allocated for the building of a combined city hall and fire department. The bottom half served as the fire department, while the upper floors were utilized as a combination City Hall and meeting area. The building was made of brick and located at 115 South G Street. This building served as "Station 1" and administrative headquarters until 1978, when it was torn down and rebuilt as the existing fire headquarters.

On May 12, 1916, the residence of A.L. Jacobs was destroyed by fire. The Lompoc Journal reported the next week, on May 19, 1916: "The idea which will be presented at Monday's meeting will be the suggestion that chief be elected and a company organized, each member of which is to be assigned some special duty, thus making every move at a fire count."

On June 2, 1916, Charles Everett was elected as chief engineer (fire chief) of the volunteer fire department. Chief Everett served as Lompoc's fire chief from 1916 until 1950, when he had to retire due to a heart condition. In honor of Chief Everett, a special mural was commissioned to local artists Pat and Robert Saul. The mural is taken from a 1923 family photograph of Charles Everett and his three-year-old son Ed in front of the fire house on a 1922 Seagrave fire engine.

== Stations and apparatus ==
=== Santa Barbara County Renumbering ===
In 2020, the County of Santa Barbara revamped their countywide fire resource numbering scheme to create a more cohesive numbering system among the County's seven fire departments. The revamp helped standardize nomenclature for different resources and eliminated the duplication of resource names (multiple fire departments all having an Engine 1, Engine 2, etc). In the new scheme, each fire department was assigned a block of ten sequential numbers. The one exception was the Santa Barbara County Fire Department who was assigned three separate blocks of ten due to their size.

==== Renumbering to the 50-series ====
Lompoc was assigned the 50-series of numbers. Fire Stations 1 and 2 became 51 and 52 respectively. The resources assigned to those fire stations were also renumbered to fall in line with their respective numbering (i.e. Engine 1 to Engine 51). This move resulted in Santa Barbara County Fire Station 51 being renumbered to 34, matching the number sequence for the Santa Ynez Valley.

Station	Address	Engine Company	Truck Company	EMS Units	Wildland Units	Command Units	Specialty Response Units
51	115 South G Street	Engine 51; Engine 151 (reserve)	None Currently	Rescue 51; Rescue 151 (reserve)	Engine 351	Duty Battalion Chief; 51, 52, 53	USAR (Medium); RTF-12 Base of Operations (BoO)
52	1100 North D Street	Engine 52; Engine 152 (reserve)					UTV 52

=== Type 1 Engines ===
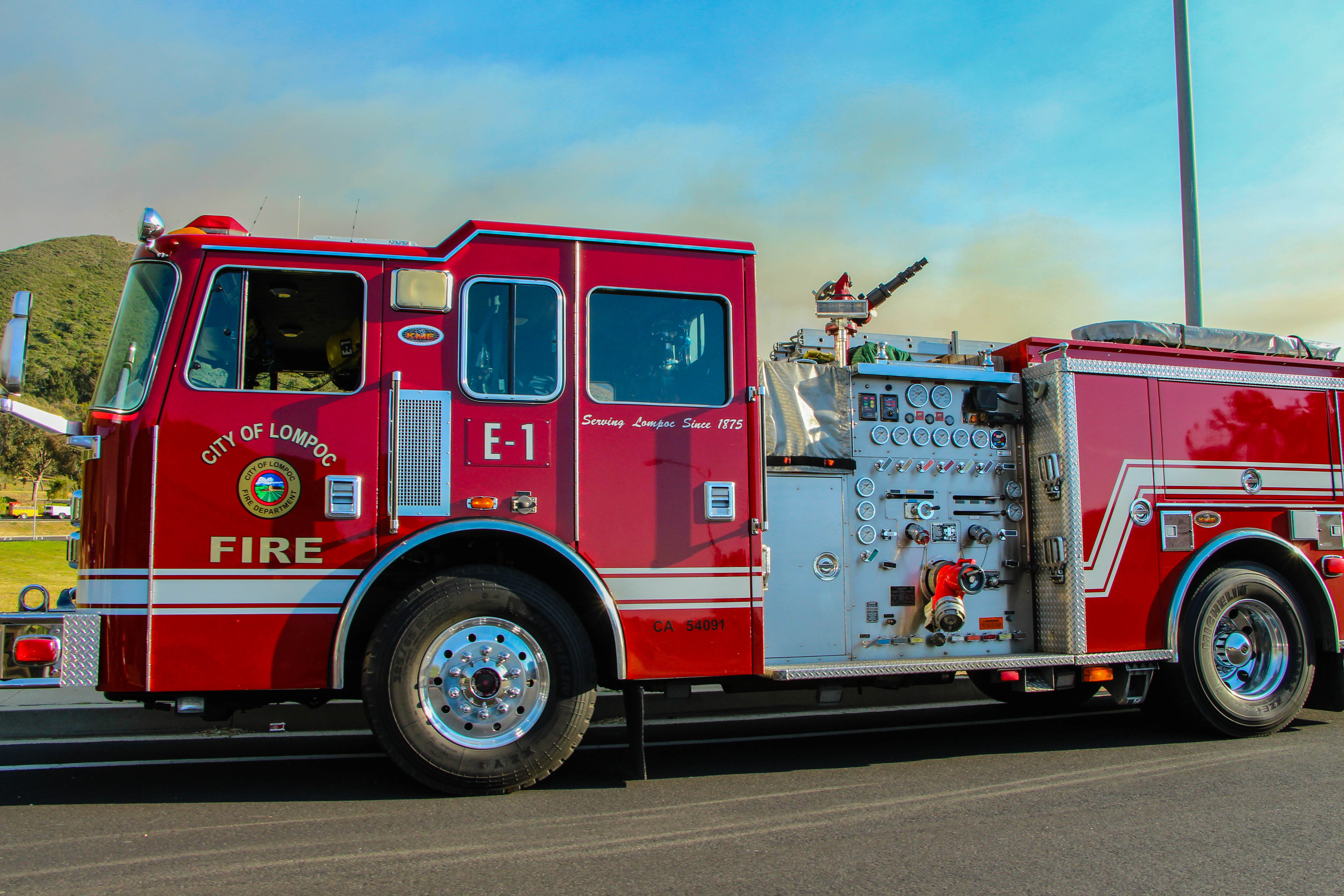
Engine 1 providing structure protection during the Miguelito Fire in 2014.

Engine 51, Engine 52, Engine 151 and Engine 152 are all urban firefighting engines. Engines 51 and 52 are staffed full-time with: a captain, engineer and firefighter. Engines 151 and 152 are typically used as a reserve apparatus, though they may be up-staffed on occasion for special occasions and/or anticipated periods of high call volume (i.e. Independence Day, festivals, etc.). All engines carry 500 US gallons (1,900 L) of water and 60 US gallons (230 L) of foam concentrate (Class A: 30 US gallons (110 L) / Class B: 30 US gallons (110 L)). Engines 51, 151 and 152 are outfitted with a 1,250 US gallons per minute (4,700 L/min) single-stage pump, while Engine 52 has a 1,500 US gallons per minute (5,700 L/min) GPM single-stage pump.

=== Type 3 Engine ===
Engine 351 is designed for use with vegetation, wildland and brush fires. Unlike Type 1 engines, which are mainly designed for urban structural firefighting, Type 3 engines have a shorter wheelbase and are typically 4-wheel drive, making them ideal for uneven or steep terrain.

In May 2014, Engine 351 was purchased to replace the aging Engine 352 (now retired). In August 2023 the Lompoc city council approved the purchase of a brand new 2023 pierce type 3 brush engine. Engine 351 serves as the primary response apparatus for Type 3 incidents.

=== Addition of Rescue 51 ===
In 2013, the department added its first piece of response apparatus since 1960. Statistics dictated that the department didn't have a unit available for response an average of 15.17 percent of the time, while 25-30 percent of the department's calls for service were simultaneous while both Engine 1 and 2 were committed to other incidents.

Rescue 51 is a Ford F-450 with a utility bed and skid-mount pump. In addition to the pump, Rescue 51 carries 200 US gallons (760 L) of water and 10 US gallons (38 L) of Class A foam concentrate. Rescue 51 is staffed full-time with 2 firefighters and responds to emergency medical incidents, traffic collisions, structure fires, and any other incident where additional manpower is needed.

=== Aerial ladder truck ===
Truck 51 has been retired from service.

== Specialty operations ==
The LFD is a member of various specialty response units within Santa Barbara County. Along with providing equipment, the LFD maintains daily staffing that fulfills the roster requirements of each team.

=== Urban Search and Rescue (USAR) ===
The LFD is typed as a "medium" USAR department and participates in the California Emergency Management Agency (CalEMA) Urban Search and Rescue program as a member of Regional Task Force 12 (RTF-12). The other departments that comprise the team, include: Santa Barbara County Fire Department, Santa Barbara City Fire Department, Montecito Fire Protection District, Carpinteria-Summerland Fire Protection District, Santa Maria Fire Department and Vandenberg Air Force Base Fire Department.

=== Hazardous Materials Team ===
Hazardous materials (HazMat) incidents involve the release of dangerous chemicals (including nuclear and biological agents) that could cause the loss of life, destruction of property or harm the environment. The LFD participates in the North Santa Barbara County multi-agency Hazardous Materials Team. The team also consists of members from the Santa Barbara County Fire Department and Santa Maria Fire Department.

=== Fire Investigations ===
The LFD has a Fire Investigation Division that is charged with investigating the cause and origin of fires within its jurisdiction. The LFD is a participant in the Santa Barbara County Regional Arson Taskforce.
