= Purisimeño language =

Extinct Chumashan language of California, US

Purisimeño
- Native to: California, United States
- Region: Lompoc
- Extinct: early 1900s
- Language family: Chumashan: Southern; Central; Purisimeño

Language codes
- ISO 639-3: puy
- Glottolog: puri1259
- Purisimeño

- Purisimeño is classified as Extinct by the UNESCO Atlas of the World's Languages in Danger.

Purisimeño was one of the Chumashan languages traditionally spoken along the coastal areas of Southern California near Lompoc. It was also spoken at the La Purisima Mission.

A vocabulary of "La Purrissima or Kagimuswas (Purismeno Chumash)" was collected by Henry Wetherbee Henshaw in 1884. John P. Harrington also documented the language, and wrote a sketch of the grammar.

Dr. Timothy Henry of the Western Institute for Endangered Language Documentation (WIELD) created a dictionary of the language.

== Phonology ==
Consonants
		Bilabial		Alveolar		Postalveolar	Palatal	Velar	Uvular	Pharyngeal	Glottal
		Voiceless	Voiced	Voiceless	Voiced	Postalveolar	Palatal	Velar	Uvular	Pharyngeal	Glottal
Plosive	Plain	p		t				k	q		ʔ
Plosive	Aspirated	pʰ		tʰ				kʰ	qʰ		
Plosive	Ejective	pʼ		tʼ				kʼ	qʼ		
Fricative	Plain			s		ʃ			χ	ħ	h
Fricative	Aspirated			sʰ		ʃʰ					
Fricative	Ejective			sʼ		ʃʼ					
Affricate	Plain			ts		ʧ					
Affricate	Aspirated			tsʰ		ʧʰ					
Affricate	Ejective			tsʼ		ʧʼ					
Approximant	Plain		w	ɬ	l		j				
Approximant	Glottalized		ˀw		ˀl		ˀj				
Nasal	Plain		m		n						
Nasal	Glottalized		ˀm		ˀn						

Vowels
	Front	Central	Back
Close	i		u
Mid	e	ǝ	o
Open		a	

The exact backness of /a/ is difficult to determine. It was either a central or back vowel.

== Grammar ==
=== Nouns ===
Person/number prefixes
	1st	2nd	3rd
singular	k-	p-	s-
dual	k(i)š-	p(i)š-	šiš-
plural	ki(y)-	pi(y)-	si(y)-
unspecified			alam

=== Articles ===
Like many Chumashan languages, Purisimeño contains articles which can and possibly must be used in combination with nouns. Their exact function is unclear but some inferences can be gained. The first article, the prefix ’a- seemingly was used a default in citation form and can tentatively be interpreted as a marker of indefiniteness or unidentifiability, while the second article, the prefix ka- can in turn be interpreted as a marker of definiteness and/or identifiability. Though, due to a lack of surviving sources on the language it is difficult to say this with certainty.

=== Associative case ===
The associative case in Purisimeño is marked by the prefixes itš-, is-, iš-, or its̓-; and is used with nouns that usually have a strong association with a particular person such as the words for friend (itšantǝk), carrying net (ištiwa’a), pinkie (išwatimitš’i), and thumb (išwatinox̂).

=== Tense ===
Purisimeño had three tense markers for future, immediate future, and past tense with the past tense -waš being attested in nouns which had some relation to the past but where somehow still relevant in the present such as footprint (’e’ewaš).

== Orthography ==
Purisimeño alphabet
’	a	e	ǝ	h	i	k	l ~ ł	l̓	m	m̓	n	n̓	o	p	pʰ	p̓	q	qʰ	q̓	s
sʰ	s̓	š	šʰ	š̓	t	tʰ	t̓	ts	tsʰ	ts̓	tš	tšʰ	tš̓	u	w	w̓	x ~ x̂	x̓	y	y̓
