= Orland High School =

Location
- 101 Shasta St; Orland, California 95963; United States
- Coordinates: 39.740108°N 122.197284°W

Information
- School type: Comprehensive Public High School
- Status: Operating
- School district: Orland Unified School District
- Superintendent: Victor Perry
- CEEB code: 052285
- NCES School ID: 060004507090
- Principal: Alex Mercado
- Teaching staff: 37.34 (FTE)
- Grades: 9–12
- Gender: Coeducational
- Enrollment: 806 (2023-2024)
- Student to teacher ratio: 21.59
- Campus type: Suburban
- Colors: Blue & white
- Mascot: Trojan
- National ranking: 1. 6,216 according to usnews.com
- Feeder schools: C.K. Price Middle School Lake K-8 School Plaza K-8 School
- Feeder to: North Valley Continuation High School Reach Program (William Finch)
- Website: School website

Orland High School is a public high school in Orland, California, United States, a city northwest of Sacramento, California, and south of Redding, California. It is a part of the Orland Joint Unified School District.

== Enrollment ==
In the 2011–12 school year, Orland High School had an enrollment of 680 students. Orland High School is very integrated in the school years of 2011-2012 with, 0.9% American Indian/Alaska Native, 2.5% Asian, 0.1% Native Hawaiian/Pacific Islander, 0.1% Filipino, 54.1% Hispanic, 1.5% Black, and 39.5% White.

== Athletics ==
Currently, Orland High School offers its students thirteen teams. These sports include baseball, softball, basketball, football, wrestling, volleyball, track and field, cross country, soccer, golf, tennis, color guard, winter guard, marching band, and cheerleading. In 2022, Orland won the California Interscholastic Federation Division 5-A football championship against Shafter High School with a score of 20-7. In 2024, Orland won their boys' cross-country varsity league title, winning every league-specific meet

== Notable alumni ==
- John D. Nesbitt - educator and writer
- Aldrick Rosas - Detroit Lions, NFL
