= Surf, California =

Unincorporated community in California, United States

- Unincorporated area
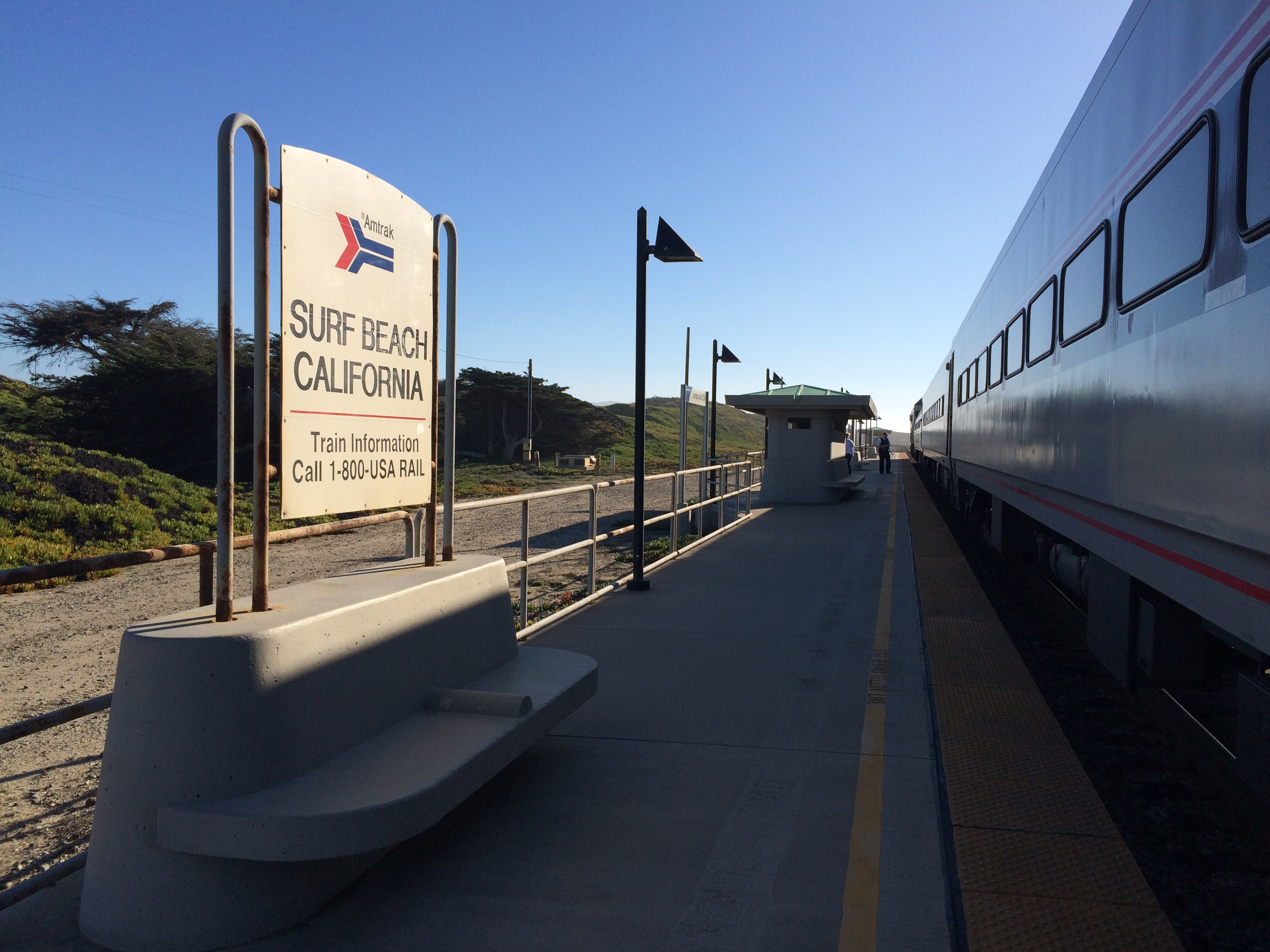
- Surf Amtrak Station

- Location within California Location within the United States
- Coordinates: 34.6844268°N 120.6035029°W
- Country: United States
- State: California
- County: Santa Barbara
- Elevation: 59 ft (18 m)
- Time zone: UTC-8 (Pacific (PST))
  - Summer (DST): UTC-7 (PDT)
- Area codes: 805 & 820
- GNIS feature ID: 250152

Surf Beach
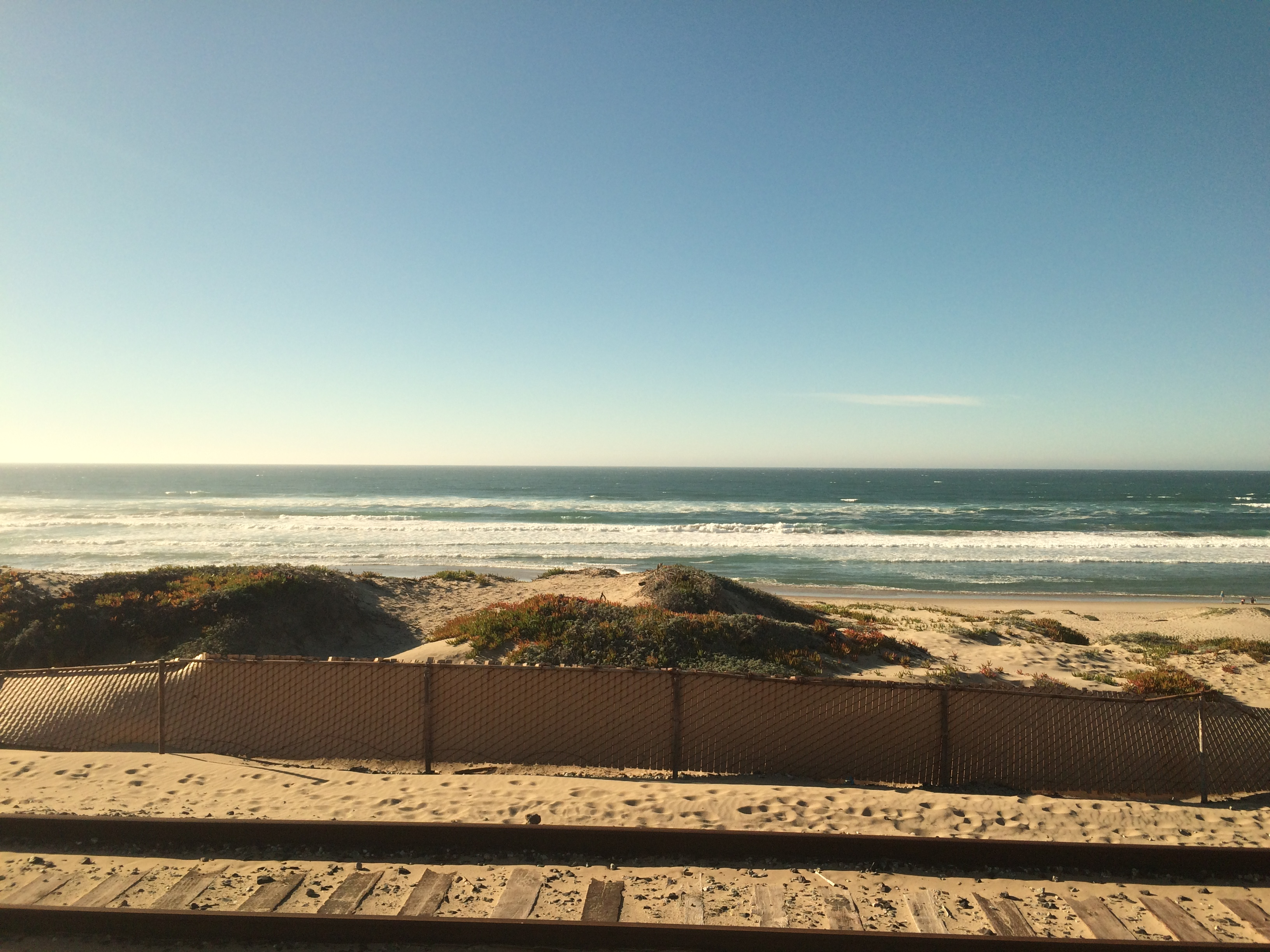
- Surf Beach as seen from the Amtrak Pacific Surfliner
- Interactive map of Surf Beach
- Operator: Vandenberg Space Force Base
- Open: October to February (those sections affected by the nesting season of the western snowy plover)
- Public transit: Pacific Surfliner at Lompoc–Surf

Surf is an unincorporated area of Santa Barbara County, California, United States, located along the Pacific coast within a publicly accessible area of Vandenberg Space Force Base, west of the city of Lompoc. The site originally was established as a railroad town, with its growth peaking after Vandenberg was established in 1941. Since 2000 the site has just consisted of Surf Beach and the unstaffed Lompoc–Surf Amtrak Station. California State Route 246 formerly ran to Surf, but in 1984 the highway was truncated at Lompoc and the road from Lompoc to Surf is designated West Ocean Avenue.

Sections of Surf Beach are closed between March 1 and September 30 every year during the nesting season of the western snowy plover. The affected areas may be opened earlier than September 30 if all the newly hatched birds reach their fledgling stage beforehand. The closures are in place to protect the bird under the Endangered Species Act. If a set number of trespass violations have been reached during any nesting season (currently 50), the beach is closed entirely.

== History ==
Surf grew as a railway town to accommodate the personnel needed to maintain the trains and tracks after Southern Pacific Railroad built a station here for its Coast Line in 1900. In 1909, the schooner cargo ship Sibyl Marston sank off the coast south from Surf. The station at Surf became popular with U.S. Army soldiers stationed at Camp Cooke (now Vandenberg Space Force Base) during World War II. The population of the town peaked at 40, with most residents being employed with the railroad. As trains modernized, Surf experienced depopulation, to the point where Southern Pacific was only operating a telegraph station. The telegraph station closed in 1985, and it was not until 2000 that the current Surf Amtrak Station was completed. The unstaffed Amtrak station is currently the only structure left standing in Surf.

Two fatal shark attacks have occurred near Surf Beach: one on October 22, 2010, and the other on October 23, 2012. Travel + Leisure has listed it as one of the worst beaches for shark attacks.

== See also ==
- List of beaches in California
- List of California state parks
