= Cara Judea Alhadeff =

American photographer

- Born: April 8, 1971 (age 54); Boulder, Colorado, U.S.
- Occupations: photographer, performance artist, writer, yoga instructor
- Children: 1

Cara Judea Alhadeff (born April 8, 1971) is an American photographer, performance artist, writer, activist, and yoga teacher. She has work in the permanent collection of the San Francisco Museum of Modern Art. In 2009 Alhadeff received the BRIO award.

== Published works ==
- 2024 Zazu Dreams: Between the Scarab and the Dung Beetle; A Cautionary Fable for the Anthropocene Era, illustrated by Micaela Amateau Amato, Eifrig Publishing
- 2022 Philosophy as Practice in the Ecological Emergency: An Exploration of Urgent Matters, “Equality: Industrial Capitalism’s Trojan Horse—Environmental Racism, Green Colonialism, and The Renewable Energies Revolution,” Lucy Weir, ed., Palgrave Macmillan
- 2022 Mother Pelican, A Journal of Solidarity and Sustainability: “Boycott Civilization, Part XV-XX”
- 2022 Medium.com, The Good Men Project, republishing 15 “Becoming Trickster” installments from Mother Pelican Journal
- 2021 Tikkun, Journal of Radical Empathy, "Sacred Attunement: Shmita as Cultural Biomimicry," November
- 2021 Tikkun, Journal of Radical Empathy, “Blood Chocolate: Lessons from Zazu Dreams,” October
- 2021 “Love & Waste: Igniting A Permaculture Paradigm Shift, Part I-IV,” Volume 17, #1-4; “Confusion as a State of Grace: Climate and Kinship in 2021, Part V-X,” Volume 17, #5-10; “Ecological Border Crossings, Part XI-XIV,” Volume 17, #11-14; “Interlude I-VI,” Volume 18, #2-7
- 2021 Deep Green Resistance News Service, "Environmental Racism, Green Colonialism, and The Renewable Energies Revolution"
- 2021 The Esperanza Project, "When Love Ignites a Creative-WasteRevolution," Part 1-4
- 2021 Communities Magazine, "Children in Community," Fall 2021, Issue #193
- 2021 Communities Magazine, "Ecological Culture," Summer 2021, Issue #191
- 2021 The Good Men Project, 36-part series, "Embodying The Trickster, Transforming the Green Economy"
- 2013 Viscous Expectations: Justice, Vulnerability, The Ob-scene Atropos Press
- The Erotic in Context Inter-Disciplinary Press – Co-edited
