= Western Institute for Endangered Language Documentation =

US nonprofit organization

- Abbreviation: WIELD
- Formation: 2013
- Headquarters: California
- President: Uldis Balodis
- Key people: Neil Alexander Walker
- Website: wieldoc.org

The Western Institute for Endangered Language Documentation, or WIELD, is a California-based 501(c)(3) nonprofit organization dedicated to the documentation, preservation, revitalization, and revival of fragmented languages, especially the Native American languages of western North America.

It was founded in 2013 by four linguists: Uldis Balodis, who has since published a grammar of the Yuki language, Jessica Kirchner, whose doctoral work had included engagement with the Kʷak̓ʷala language, Timothy Henry-Rodriguez, who had written a pedagogical grammar of Ventureño Chumash for his dissertation, and Neil Alexander Walker, who has since published a grammar of the Southern Pomo language. These four founding board members are symbolized on the WIELD corporate seal via phonetic symbols drawn from the four aforementioned languages studied by each scholar.

Since its founding, WIELD has overseen several projects. In 2014, a WIELD board member located the last fluent speaker of the Wappo language, and he and another board member made two trips to make audio recordings of Wappo before the speaker died. At around the same time, WIELD entered into an agreement with the California Indian Museum and Cultural Center (CIMCC) in which WIELD taught Southern Pomo language classes to heritage students in the CIMCC's facilities.

Additional long-term projects by WIELD have included support for archival work on the extinct Northeastern Pomo language and the creation of a Purisimeño Chumash dictionary. WIELD has created a careful standard for Americanist Phonetic Notation, which is a system in more common use for North American languages than is the International Phonetic Alphabet. WIELD has also innovated a Twitter-based model for hosting and archiving presentations for international workshops on fragmented languages.
