= Lee Ann Roripaugh =

American poet

- Born: 1965 (age 60–61); Laramie, Wyoming, U.S.
- Education: Indiana University Bloomington
- Occupation: Professor of English
- Employer: University of South Dakota
- Parent: Robert Roripaugh Yoshiko Horikoshi

Lee Ann Roripaugh (born 1965) is an American poet and was the South Dakota poet laureate from 2015 to 2019. Lee Ann Roripaugh is the author of five volumes of poetry: tsunami vs. the fukushima 50 (Milkweed Editions, 2019), Dandarians (Milkweed, Editions, 2014), On the Cusp of a Dangerous Year (Southern Illinois University Press, 2009), Year of the Snake (Southern Illinois University Press, 2004), and Beyond Heart Mountain (Penguin, 1999). She was named winner of the Association of Asian American Studies Book Award in Poetry/Prose for 2004, and a 1998 winner of the National Poetry Series.

== Early life ==
Roripaugh was born in 1965 in Laramie, Wyoming. She is the daughter of Robert Roripaugh, poet laureate of Wyoming, and Japanese immigrant, Yoshiko Horikoshi. Her parents met while her father was serving in the US army stationed in Japan, he met her mother and they married in 1956. Growing up in overwhelmingly white Wyoming, in the same state thousands of Japanese Americans were interned in during World War II, Roripaugh grappled with her own mixed race identity. The American West and Japanese culture are visible influences in Roripaugh's work. She earned a B.M. in piano performance from Indiana University Bloomington, as well as an M.M. in music history and an M.F.A. in creative writing.

== Career ==
Roripaugh is a Professor of English and the Director of Creative Writing at the University of South Dakota. Her interests include Creative Writing (Poetry, Fiction, CNF, Mixed Genres), Contemporary American Poetry, Asian American Literature, Multicultural Literature, Poetics, intersectional identities, ecocriticism, popular culture (particularly Whedonverse), representations of queer identity in popular culture, and cyborgs. She is also Editor-in-Chief of South Dakota Review. She was appointed to a four-year term as South Dakota's poet laureate in July 2015.

== Awards ==
- Academy of American Poets Prize
- AWP Intro Award
- 1995 Randall Jarrell International Poetry Prize
- 1998 National Poetry Series, for Beyond Heart Mountain selected by Ishmael Reed
- 2001 Frederick Manfred Award for Best Creative Writing
- 2003 Bush Artist Fellowship
- 2004 Association of Asian American Studies Book Award in Poetry/Prose
- 2004 Winner of the Prairie Schooner Strousse Award
- 2017 Recipient, Women's International Studies Center Fellowship Residency
- 2019 Recipient, South Dakota Author of the Year, Awarded by the South Dakota Council of Teachers of English, South Dakota Council of Teachers of English

== Selected publications ==
=== Books ===
- Beyond Heart Mountain. Penguin Books. 1999. ISBN 978-0-14-058920-7.
- Year of the Snake. Southern Illinois University Press. 2004. ISBN 978-0-8093-2569-6.
- On the Cusp of a Dangerous Year. Southern Illinois University Press. 2009. ISBN 978-0-8093-2929-8.
- Dandarians. Milkweed Editions. 2014. ISBN 978-1571314581.
- Tsunami Vs. the Fukushima 50: Poems. Milkweed Editions. 2019. ISBN 978-1571314857.

=== Anthologies ===
- Robert Pack; Jay Parini, eds. (1994). American Identities: Contemporary Multicultural Voices. UPNE. ISBN 978-0-87451-759-0.
- Gerald Costanzo; Jim Daniels, eds. (2000). American Poetry: The Next Generation. Carnegie Mellon University Press. ISBN 978-0-88748-343-1.
- Linda M. Hasselstrom; Gaydell Collier; Nancy Curtis, eds. (2002). "Pearls". Woven on the Wind: Women Write about Friendship in the Sagebrush West. Houghton Mifflin Harcourt. p. 59. ISBN 978-0-618-21920-9. "Lee Ann Roripaugh."
- Victoria M. Chang, ed. (2004). "Transplanting". Asian American poetry: the next generation. University of Illinois Press. ISBN 978-0-252-07174-4.
- Lorrie Goldensohn, ed. (2006). American war poetry: an anthology. Columbia University Press. ISBN 978-0-231-13310-4.
- William J. Walsh, ed. (2006). "Snow Country". Under the rock umbrella: contemporary American poets, 1951-1977. Mercer University Press. ISBN 978-0-88146-047-6.

=== Ploughshares ===
- "Toothpick Warriors". Ploughshares. Fall 2001. Archived from the original on August 19, 2009.
- "Hope". Ploughshares. Fall 2001. Archived from the original on August 19, 2009.
