= Lompoc–Surf station =

Railway station in Surf, California, US

Lompoc–Surf, CA
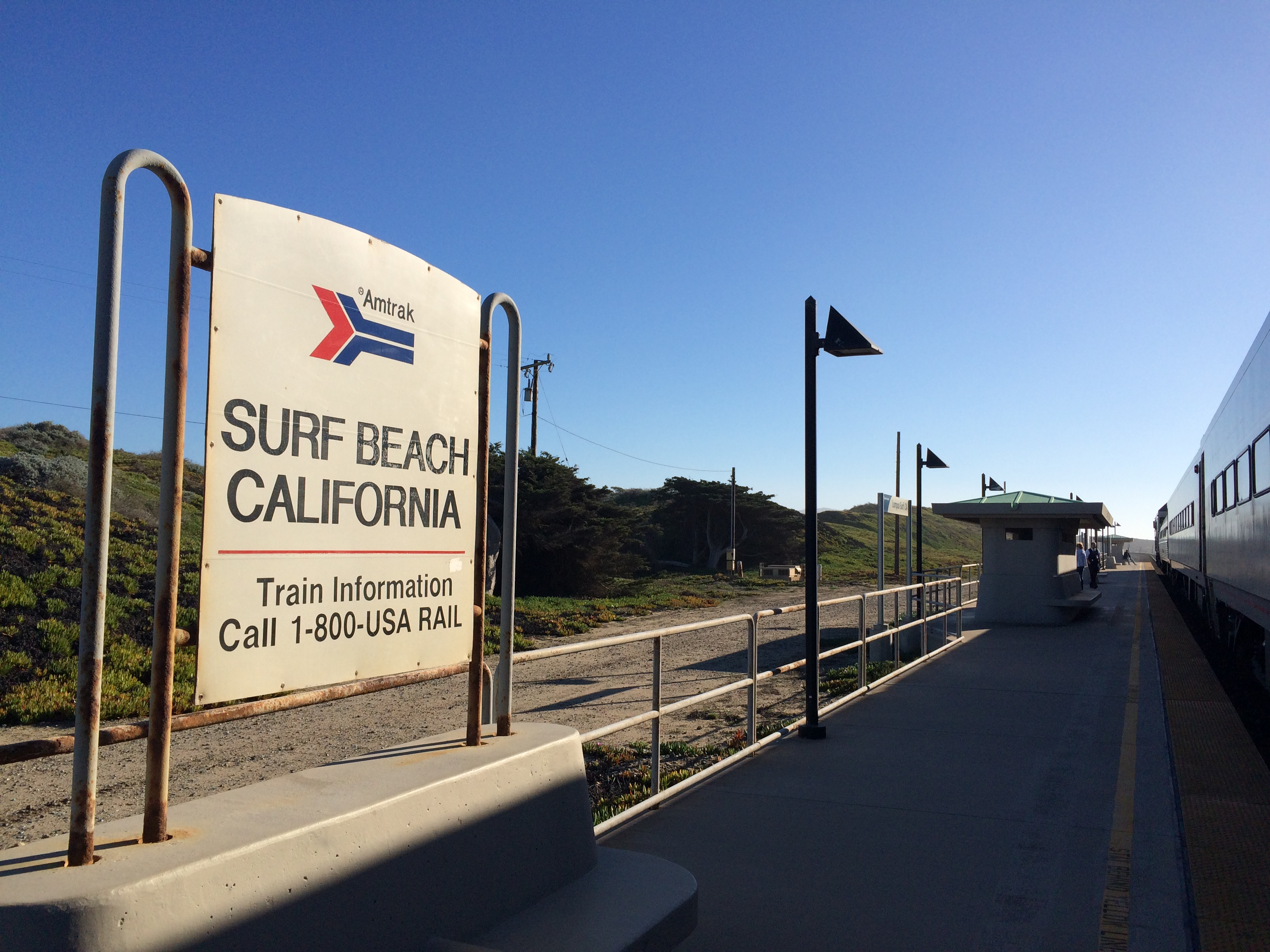
- Pacific Surfliner at the station in 2012

General information
- Location: Ocean Avenue and Park Road; Surf, California; United States
- Coordinates: 34°40′59″N 120°36′18″W
- Owner: Union Pacific Railroad
- Line: UP Santa Barbara Subdivision
- Platforms: 1 side platform
- Tracks: 2

Construction
- Parking: Yes
- Accessible: Yes

Other information
- Status: Unstaffed, platform with shelters
- Station code: Amtrak: LPS

History
- Opened: March 18, 2000

Passengers
- FY 2025: 9,625 (Amtrak)

Services
Preceding station	Amtrak	Following station
Guadalupe toward San Luis Obispo	Pacific Surfliner	Goleta toward San Diego
Coast Starlight does not stop here
Former services
Preceding station	Southern Pacific Railroad	Following station
Casmalia toward San Francisco	Coast Line	Jalama toward Los Angeles
Terminus	Surf – Lompoc	Lompoc Terminus
Location

Lompoc–Surf station is a passenger rail station in Surf, California, west of the city of Lompoc. It is served by Amtrak's Pacific Surfliner from San Luis Obispo to San Diego.

Lompoc–Surf station is served by 4 Amtrak Pacific Surfliner trains (2 in each direction).

In fiscal year 2025, 9,625 passengers boarded or detrained at Lompoc–Surf station.

The station opened for service on March 18, 2000. Pre-Amtrak, a Southern Pacific Railroad station was located at Surf. Passenger service ended by 1971, but a telegraph office remained in use until 1985.
