= Wyoming Arts Council =

The Wyoming Arts Council is a state-funded arts group which provides grants to art and cultural projects within Wyoming. Established in 1967, in 1990 the Arts Council occupied the historic Kendrick Building, which it renovated in Cheyenne, Wyoming. Currently, the WAC is located in the Barrett Building with Wyoming State Museum. The Governor's Art Awards is an annual program to award artists, patrons and others who have benefited the arts in the state.
