= Robert Roripaugh =

American poet (1930–2018)

- Born: August 26, 1930; Oxnard, California, U.S.
- Died: January 2, 2019 (aged 88); Laramie, Wyoming
- Education: University of Wyoming
- Occupation: Poet
- Spouse: Yoshiko Horikoshi
- Children: Lee Ann Roripaugh

Robert Roripaugh (August 26, 1930 – January 2, 2019) was an American poet. He was the poet laureate of Wyoming from 1995 to 2002. He became a professor of English at his alma mater, the University of Wyoming. Roripaugh died on January 2, 2019, in Laramie, Wyoming.
