= Brian Asher Alhadeff =

American conductor (born 1973)

Brian Asher Alhadeff (born May 16, 1973) is an internationally recognized American conductor of opera, ballet, symphony, and musical theater. He is the General and Artistic Director of Opera San Luis Obispo, in addition to its Principal Conductor. He is also principal conductor of Civic Ballet San Luis Obispo, Ventura County Ballet, and State Street Ballet of Santa Barbara, California. Alhadeff has also held the position of Artistic Director and Conductor of the Lompoc Pops Orchestra since 2015. He is known for his efforts in promoting opera relevancy through expanded collaboration between opera companies and other arts organizations that have key participation in opera production: symphonies, choruses, and ballet and dance organizations.

== Early life ==
Alhadeff was born and raised in Southern California and began playing piano at age 7. He graduated from Woodrow Wilson High School in Long Beach, California. Prior to his conducting career, Alhadeff competed internationally as a pianist, and frequently performed in several chamber music ensembles.

== Education ==
Alhadeff studied conducting at the Peabody Conservatory of Music (Baltimore, MD) and the Janáček Academy of Music (Brno, Czech Republic). He holds a Bachelor of Arts from Loyola Marymount University (Los Angeles), a Masters of Music from California State University, Los Angeles, and a Doctorate of Musical Arts from UCLA Herb Alpert School of Music in 2006.

== Professional career ==
In 2013 Alhadeff developed the Citywide Arts Collaboration concept for Opera San Luis Obispo - a business model for large scale opera production that unifies the collaborative efforts of several well established and "opera complementary" arts organizations under the financial umbrella of one parent arts organization Opera San Luis Obispo. The Citywide Arts Collaboration formula was tested in an October 2013 full-scale production of Georges Bizet's opera Carmen. The resulted over 90% audience capacity for all performances. In May 2014, the same formula was applied to a full-scale production of Jerome Kern and Oscar Hammerstein II's Show Boat which yielded audience capacities above 92% at all performances. Opera San Luis Obispo has continued to employ this formula to similar success: Aida - 2014, Cavalleria Rusticana and Pagliacci in 2015, 30th Anniversary Gala and La Bohème in 2016. Opera San Luis Obispo opened their eighth consecutive Citywide Arts Collaboration: Madama Butterfly, in October 2017.

From 1997 to 2007 Alhadeff was Associate Conductor of the Beverly Hills Symphony. Alhadeff has also held the position of Principal Conductor for Ballet Tucson (Arizona) and Riverside Ballet Arts (California). From 2002 to 2008 Alhadeff was Artistic Director and founder of the Hradec Kralove International Summer Opera Festival that partnered with the Eastern Bohemian Philharmonic and the Czech State Opera and Ballet. In 2010, Alhadeff guest conducted the Albanian National Radio and Television Orchestra in a nationwide broadcast that included the Albanian premiere of American composer Howard Hanson's Symphony No. 2 The Romantic. In 2016 Alhadeff conducted the world premiere of John Cepelak and Christiana Rose's one-act contemporary opera Abraham Lincoln: The African American American Connection for Golden Gate Opera. In 2017, Alhadeff returned to Golden Gate Opera to conduct the American West Coast premiere of Gian Carlo Menotti's 1982 one-act opera The Boy Who Grew Too Fast.

Some of Alhadeff's guest conducting highlights include Tulsa Ballet, Southern Arizona Symphony Orchestra, Karlove Vary Sinfonie, San Luis Obispo Symphony, UCLA Opera Program, South Florida Opera Company, Eastern Sierra Symphony, Bourgas State Opera, Rio Hondo Symphony, Long Beach Opera, Chinese Cultural Center of San Francisco, California State University Los Angeles Opera Theater, California Polytechnic State University Opera Theater Workshop, and Grand Valley State University (MI) Opera, Ballet and Musical Theater.

Alhadeff frequently lectures throughout the US and abroad on a variety of topics, but most often subjects having to do with opera, ballet, and musical theater. In 2009 Alhadeff founded Operanutz!, an opera appreciation course which combines live lecture with projection of a variety of original media. He has served on the vocal and conducting faculty for Symphonic Workshops LTD International Opera Workshops, and as a university professor, he has guest lectured at numerous colleges and universities as well as served on the faculties of La Sierra University (CA), and Grand Valley State University (MI). He focuses on inspiring all ages and backgrounds through an original, dynamic style of performance education that combines live lectures with seamlessly integrated video projection of a variety of multimedia.

== Personal life ==
Alhadeff currently resides in Templeton, California, with his wife and two children.
