= Santa Maria Regional Transit =

California bus service

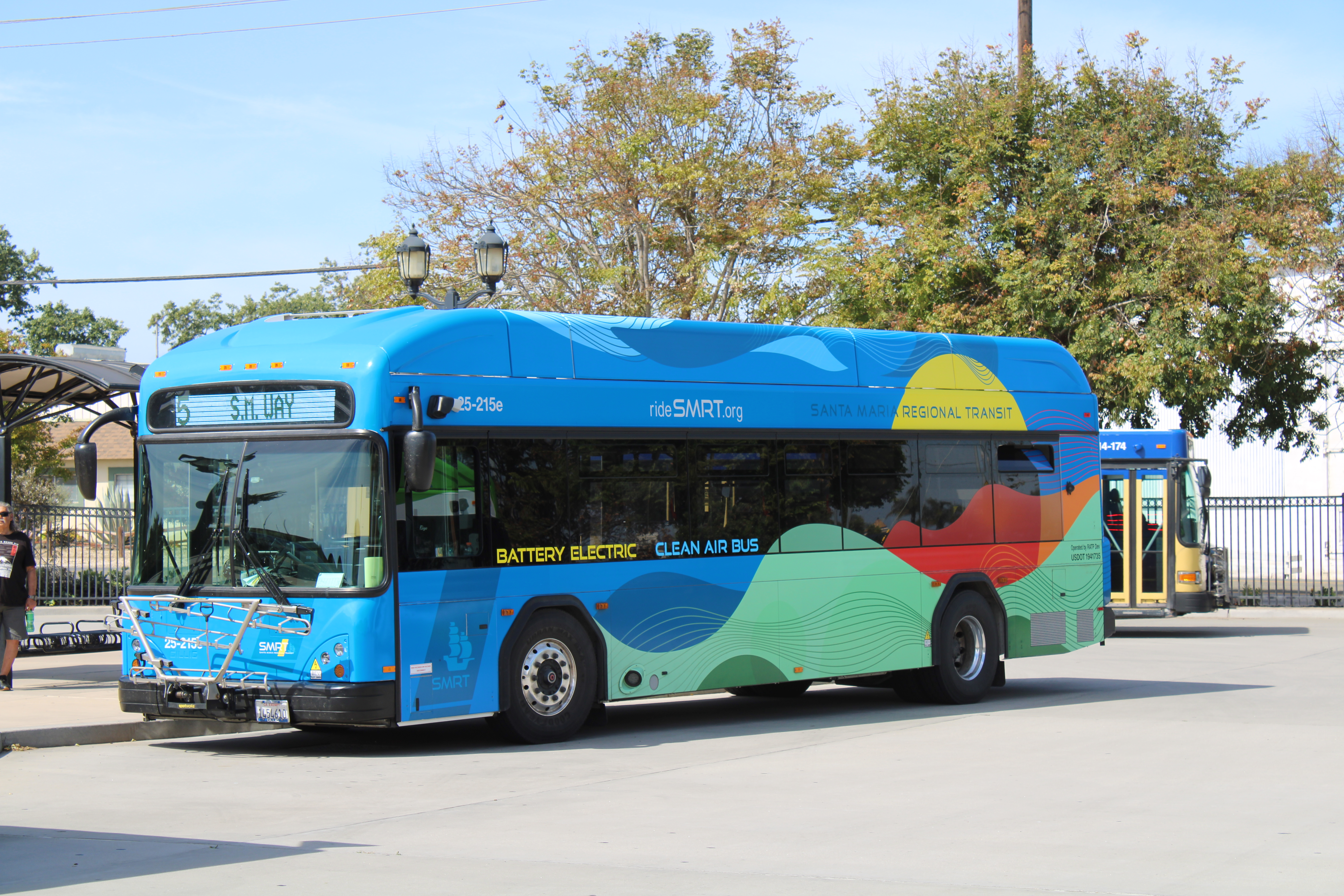
- SMRT Gillig electric bus at the Santa Maria Transit Center
- Parent: City of Santa Maria
- Headquarters: 1303 Fairway Drive
- Locale: Santa Maria, California
- Service type: Transit bus, paratransit, microtransit
- Routes: 19
- Fleet: 24 buses
- Daily ridership: 1,970 per weekday (2024)
- Annual ridership: 554,759 (2024)
- Fuel type: CNG, battery electric
- Operator: RATP Dev
- Website: SMRT

Santa Maria Regional Transit (SMRT), formerly Santa Maria Area Transit (SMAT), is a bus service local to Santa Maria, California, providing both intracity service within Santa Maria and intercity service within Santa Barbara County and San Luis Obispo County, including routes to Guadalupe, Lompoc, Buellton, Solvang, Vandenberg Space Force Base, and San Luis Obispo.

== History ==
Public transit service has been operated by the city of Santa Maria since 1978. That year, Santa Maria contracted the Santa Maria Organization of Transportation Helpers (SMOOTH) to operate a single fixed route along Broadway. A second fixed route was added in 1981, and Saturday operations began in 1982. SMOOTH operated Santa Maria's local service until 2004, when the contract was awarded to MV Public Transportation, Inc. That year, Sunday service was added, along with a fare increase.

First Transit was awarded the operations and maintenance contract in 2009. The Santa Maria Transit Center, which is the origin point for many intracity and all intercity lines, was opened in 2011, at 400 East Boone Street. Santa Maria awarded the operating contract to RATP Dev in 2018.

In December 2021, the Santa Maria City Council approved service changes to commence in January, including route consolidation, two new transfer sites, and the addition of timed transfers at the primary Transit Center hub. Amtrak Thruway buses, however, board across the freeway at 205 South Nicholson Avenue. With the update to the services, the agency was rebranded from Santa Maria Area Transit to Santa Maria Regional Transit.

=== Regional Expansion and Consolidation ===
In July 2023, the regional Breeze 100, 200, and New Cuyama routes were consolidated into Santa Maria Regional Transit and rebranded to SMRT routes 30, 20, and 50 respectively. This expanded SMRT service to the Santa Ynez Valley, Lompoc, and Vandenberg Space Force Base.

In June 2025, the city of Guadalupe consolidated its transit network into Santa Maria Regional Transit.

In October 2025, the creation of the Route 210 established an express commuter connection to downtown San Luis Obispo from the Santa Maria Crossroads Center.

=== Fleet Electrification ===
In 2025, Santa Maria Regional Transit completed a four-year fleet electrification initiative, making Santa Maria among the first cities in the United States to achieve full transit fleet electrification. This was a factor in SMRT receiving the Community Transportation Association of America's Large Transportation System of the Year Award in 2025.

== Routes ==
=== Local routes ===
Route	Terminals		Via	Notes
1	Santa Maria Santa Maria Transit Center	Santa Maria Hidden Pines Wy & Preisker Ln	Broadway	
2	Santa Maria Santa Maria Transit Center	Santa Maria Suey Crossing Rd & Donovan Rd	Western Av, Donovan Rd	
2	Santa Maria Santa Maria Transit Center	Santa Maria Pioneer Valley High School (academic year only)	Western Av, Donovan Rd	
3	Santa Maria Santa Maria Transit Center	Santa Maria Suey Crossing Rd & Donovan Rd	Main St, Suey Rd	
3	Santa Maria Santa Maria Transit Center	Santa Maria Pioneer Valley High School (academic year only)	Main St, Suey Rd	
4	Santa Maria Santa Maria Transit Center	Santa Maria Crossroads	Cook St, Thornburg St, Betteravia Rd	
5	Santa Maria Santa Maria Transit Center	Santa Maria Lakeview Rd & Orcutt Expy	Miller St, Santa Maria Wy	Serves Allan Hancock College
6	Santa Maria Bradley Rd & Crossroads Ln	Santa Maria Blosser Rd & Terrazzo Wy	Bradley Rd	
7	Santa Maria Santa Maria Transit Center	Santa Maria McCoy Ln & Broadway	Bradley Rd	Serves Allan Hancock College
8	Santa Maria Sandalwood & Black Rd	Santa Maria Bradley Rd & Crossroads Ln	Mahoney Rd, McCoy Ln	
9	Santa Maria Santa Maria Transit Center	Santa Maria Suey Crossing Rd & Donovan Rd	Alvin Av	
9	Santa Maria Santa Maria Transit Center	Santa Maria Pioneer Valley High School (academic year only)	Alvin Av	
11	Santa Maria Santa Maria Transit Center	Santa Maria Bradley Rd & Crossroads Ln	Broadway	
12X	Santa Maria Santa Maria Transit Center	Santa Maria Clark Ave & Orcutt Rd	Broadway	
13X	Santa Maria Santa Maria Transit Center	Santa Maria Suey Crossing Rd & Donovan Rd	Broadway, Donovan Rd	
13X	Santa Maria Santa Maria Transit Center	Santa Maria Pioneer Valley High School (academic year only)	Broadway, Donovan Rd	
14	Santa Maria Santa Maria Transit Center	Santa Maria Fairway Dr	Main St, S Blosser Rd	Serves Santa Maria Airport

=== Regional Routes ===
Route	Terminals		Via	Notes
20	Santa Maria Santa Maria Transit Center	Santa Ynez Chumash Casino Resort	US 101, SR 246	Former Breeze 200; Serves Allan Hancock College
30	Santa Maria Santa Maria Transit Center	Lompoc Lompoc Transit Hub	SR 1	Former Breeze 100; Serves Santa Maria Airport
40	Santa Maria Santa Maria Transit Center	Guadalupe Guadalupe Amtrak Station	Main St, SR 166	Formerly the Guadalupe Flyer; Connects Santa Maria to Amtrak service
41	Guadalupe Guadalupe Local	Guadalupe Guadalupe Local		Formerly Guadalupe Transit
50	Santa Maria Santa Maria Transit Center	New Cuyama Recreation District	SR 166	Reservations Required; $6.00 flat fare, $3.00 with qualifying discount
210 Express	Santa Maria Crossroads Shopping Center	San Luis Obispo Downtown Transit Center	US 101	Morning and evening commuter service only

=== Fares ===
Fare type	SMRT				Regional Routes
Fare type	One-way	Passes			One-way
Fare type	One-way	1-day	7-day	31-day	One-way
Regular	$1.50	$3.00	$12.00	$31.00	$2.00
Student (Note: Valid student ID required)	$1.25	$3.00	$12.00	$31.00	$2.00
Qualified discount (Note: Seniors (60+), persons with disabilities, and Medicare Card holders)	$0.75	$1.50	$6.00	$15.00	$1.00
Children	Free	Free	Free	Free	Free

=== Dial-a-ride ===
SMRT operates on-demand dial-a-ride paratransit services, covering the same area as the fixed-route local services.

=== SMRT Micro ===
SMRT operates a nighttime on-demand microtransit service. Weekday operating hours are 8:30PM to 10:30PM; weekend hours are 6:30PM to 8:30PM.

== Bus fleet and facilities ==
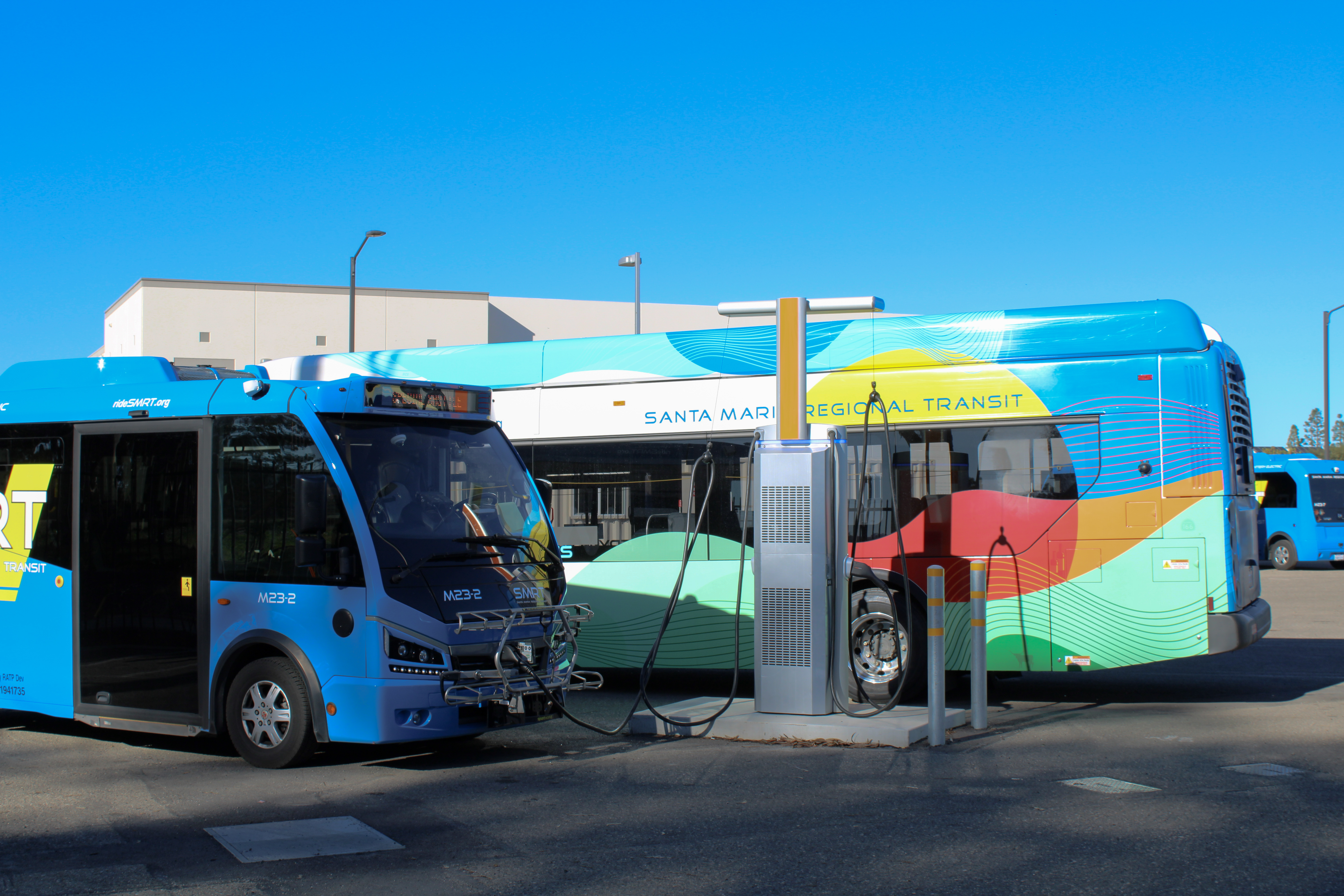
SMRT New Flyer Xcelsior and Karsan eJest charging at the SMRT operations center

=== Active fleet ===
Make/Model	Fleet numbers	Year	Engine	Transmission
Gillig Low Floor 29'	3018-186	2018	Cummins L9	Allison B400R
Gillig Low Floor 29'	3020-177	2020	Cummins L9	Allison B400R
Gillig Low Floor 35'	3518-178 to 3518-179, 3518-184	2018	Cummins L9	Allison B400R
Gillig Low Floor 35'	3521-202 to 3521-203	2021	Cummins L9	Allison B400R
Proterra ZX5	3522-200E to 3522-201E	2022	Parker GVM310-200 240 kW permanent magnet motor	Eaton 4-speed auto-shift EV transmission
New Flyer XE35	3524-202e to 3524-210e	2024	Siemens ELFA3	XALT Energy
Gillig BRT 40'	4010-195	2010	Cummins ISL9	Allison B400R
Gillig Low Floor 40'	4014-160 to 4014-162, 4014-165, 4014-167 to 4014-168, 4014-174, 4014-176, 4014-180	2013	Cummins ISL9	Allison B500R
Gillig Low Floor 40'	4014-194	2014	Cummins ISL9	Allison B500R
Gillig BRT 40'	4017-198 to 4017-199	2017	Cummins L9	Allison B400R
Gillig Low Floor Plus EV 35'	24-211e to 24-215e	2024	Cummins Battery Electric System	Direct drive
Gillig Low Floor Plus EV 35'	25-215e to 25-220e	2025	Cummins Battery Electric System	Direct drive
Karsan eJest	M23-1 to M23-14	2023	BMW i-Traction electric motor	

=== Facilities ===
The SMRT Transit Center at 400 E Boone Street has multiple bus bays. The eight bus bays on the center island and four southernmost bus bays, serve intercity routes 1, 2, 3, 4, 5, 7, 9, 11, 12X, 13X, and 14. The four northernmost bus bays (on the curb side, next to the transit center) serve longer-distance regional routes (Such as the 20 to Chumash, 30 to Lompoc, 40 to Guadalupe, and RTA Route 10 to San Luis Obispo).
