= Karsan (disambiguation) =

Karsan may refer to:

- Karsan, Turkish vehicle manufacturer
  - Karsan Jest, vehicle made by Karsan
  - Karsan J10, vehicle made by Karsan
- Karsan Ghavri, Indian cricketeer
- Karsana, Town in Nigeria
- Karsang-e Shahi Jan, also called Karsang, is a village in Iran

== See also ==
- Karzan
