= Grover Beach station =

Railway station in Grover Beach, California, US

Grover Beach, CA
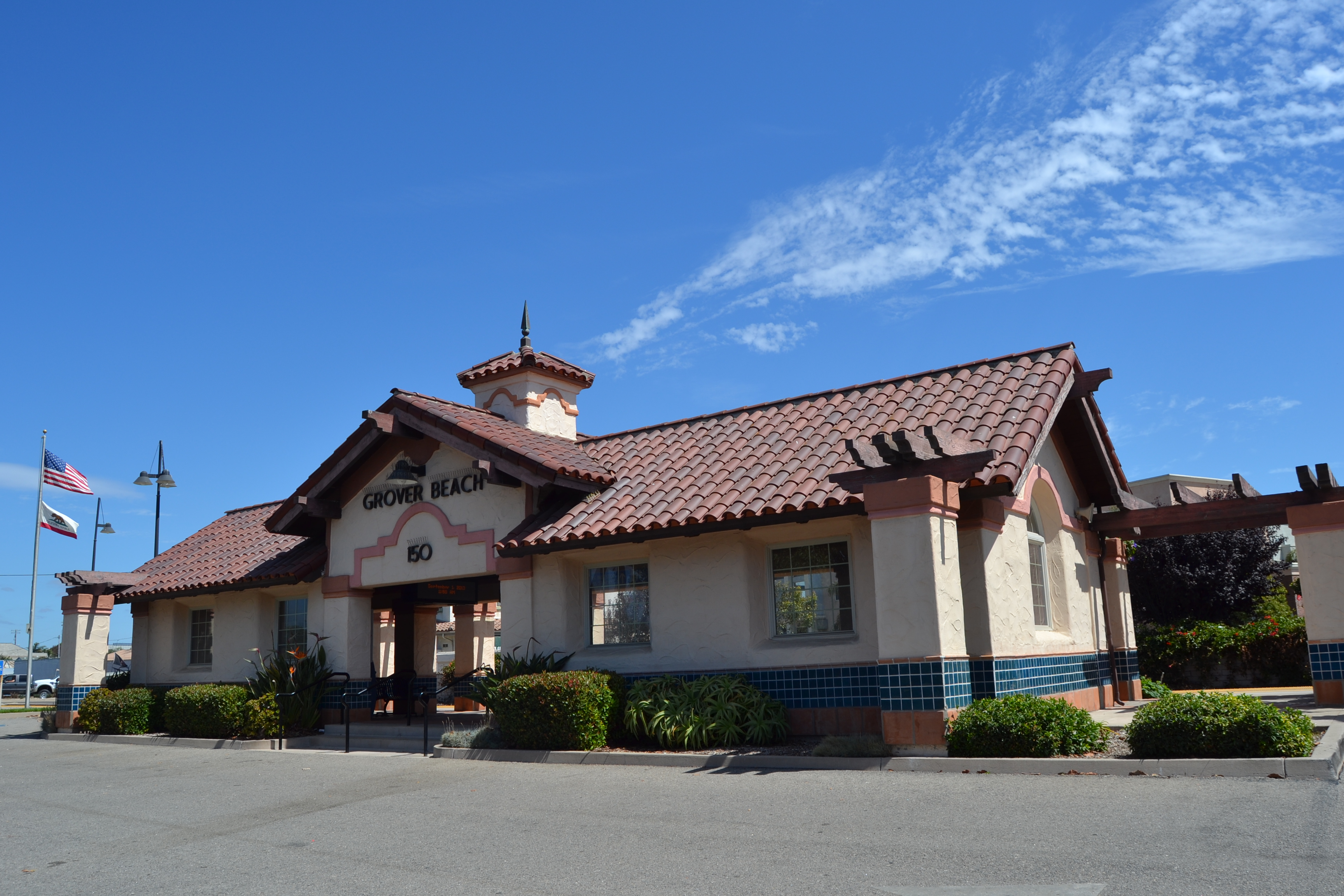
- Grover Beach station in September 2013

General information
- Location: 150 Highway 1 at Grand Avenue; Grover Beach, California; United States
- Coordinates: 35.1213°N 120.6292°W
- Line: UP Coast Line
- Platforms: 1 side platform
- Tracks: 2
- Connections: Amtrak Thruway: 17, 18, 21; San Luis Obispo Regional Transit Authority: 21, 24

Construction
- Parking: Yes
- Accessible: Yes

Other information
- Status: Unstaffed, platform with waiting room
- Station code: Amtrak: GVB

History
- Opened: November 10, 1996

Passengers
- FY 2025: 14,563 (Amtrak)

Services
Preceding station	Amtrak	Following station
San Luis Obispo Terminus	Pacific Surfliner	Guadalupe toward San Diego
Coast Starlight does not stop here
Former services
Preceding station	Southern Pacific Railroad	Following station
Pismo Beach toward San Francisco	Coast Line	Arroyo Grande toward Los Angeles
Location

Grover Beach station is a passenger rail station in the city of Grover Beach, California. Grover Beach station is served by 4 Amtrak Pacific Surfliner trains (2 in each direction). In fiscal year 2025, 14,563 passengers boarded or detrained at Grover Beach station.

The station opened on November 10, 1996 at a cost of $1.6 million. The project was coordinated by Caltrans, Amtrak and the city of Grover Beach with funding from State Transit Capital Improvement and Proposition 116 bonds. The parking lot was expanded south in 2018–2019.
