= Karsan e-ATA 10 =

Karsan electric bus

e-ATA 10

Overview
- Type: Electric Bus
- Manufacturer: Karsan Automotive Industry and Trade Joint-Stock Company

Body and chassis
- Doors: 2 (3 optional)
- Floor type: Full Low Floor
- Related: e-ATA 12 e-ATA 18

Powertrain
- Electric motor: Hub Electric Motor max 250kW
- Capacity: 32 seat capacity; +/- 79 full capacity
- Battery: LFP Up to 399 kWh
- Electric range: 350km

Dimensions
- Length: 10.750mm
- Width: 2.550mm
- Height: 3.350mm
- Curb weight: 19.000kg (19.500kg optional)

e-ATA 10 is a fully electric, full low-floor urban bus manufactured by Karsan. It operates mostly in Romania but also has a small presence in Croatia, Italy and France.

Its manufacturer, Karsan, advertises it as futuristic, sharp and dynamic. For the driver, it has a separated cabin with an ergonomic cockpit and a seat with an heat function. The passengers benefit of full low floor, high capacity for its size, USB ports for charging, and a manual ramp (electric ramp optional) ensuring accessibility for disabled passengers. It is suitable in all weather conditions.

It is highly customizable too, based on each operator's needs.

== Operating in ==
As of September, 2026.

Romania
City	Operator	Units	Status
Slatina	SC Loctrans S.A.	10	Delivered December 2021
Iași	CTP Iași (Compania de Transport Public Iași)	25	Ordered March 2024; delivery end of 2024
Botoșani	SC Eltrans S.A.	38 (11 + 27)	Ordered October 2024; delivery within 15 months
Buzău	Trans Bus Buzău	16	Ordered 2024–2025
Sighișoara	ATT (Apa Termic Transport SA Sighișoara)	8	Contract signed August 2024
Chițila	Ecotrans STCM SRL	21 (new order; fleet to total 44)	Ordered July 2025; delivery by 2026
Focșani	SC Transport Public SA Focșani (TPFocșani)	21 (new order; fleet to total 47)	Ordered July 2025; delivery by 2026
Timișoara	STPT (Societatea de Transport Public Timișoara)	30	Ordered November 2025; delivery in 2026

Croatia
City	Operator	Units	Status
Rijeka	KD Autotrolej	8	Presented 22 September 2026; in service next day
Sisak	City of Sisak (supplied via Wawa Group)	2	Contract signed 20 March 2026

Other (France and Italy)
City	Operator	Units	Status
Rosny-sous-Bois	Mobicité (RATP Cap Île-de-France), operating the Titus network	3	Put into service in 2024
Trani	-	4	-
