= Grover Beach, California =

City in California, United States

- City
- City of Grover Beach
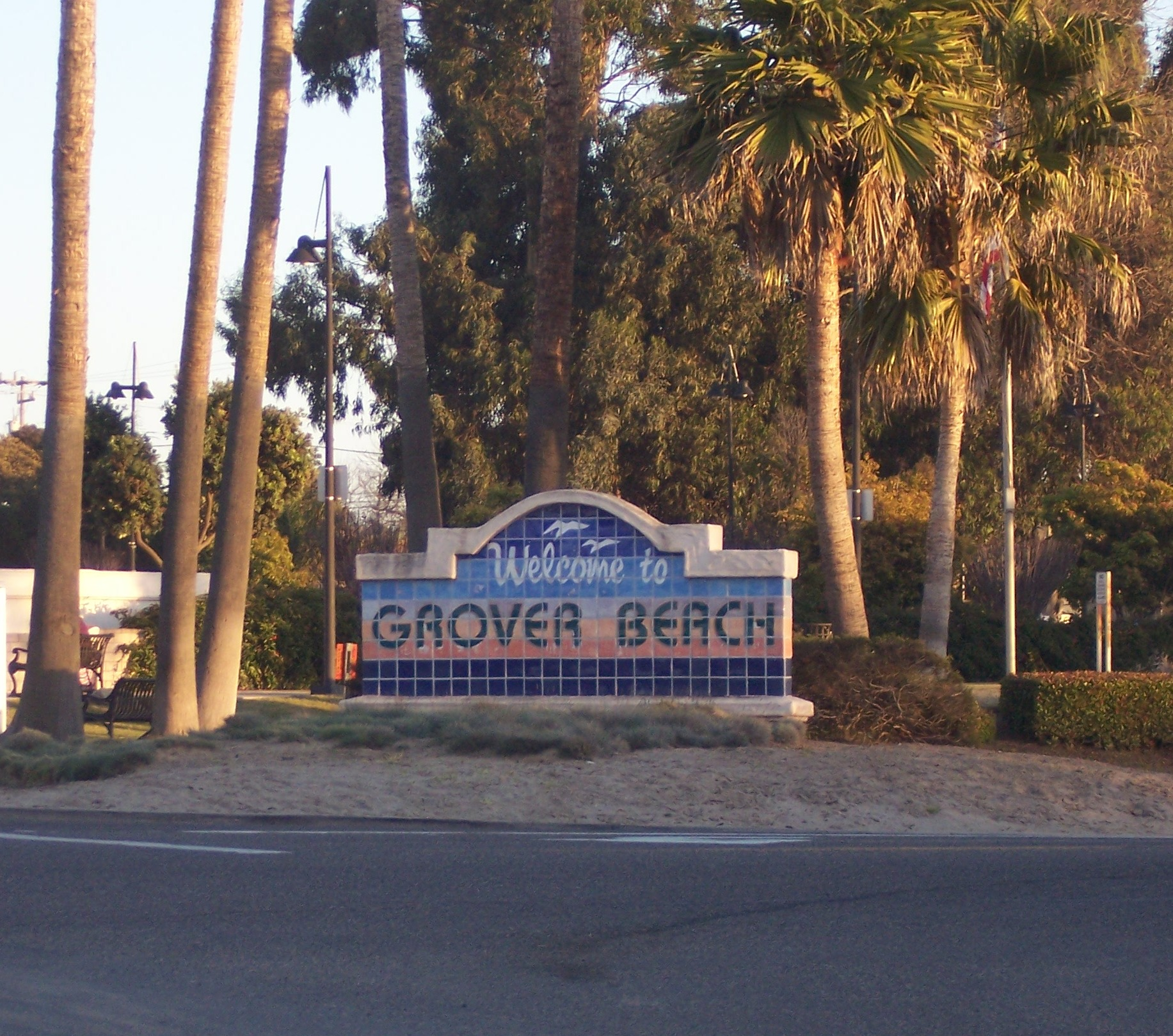
- Grover Beach Welcome Sign at the corner of Hwy 1 and West Grand Ave

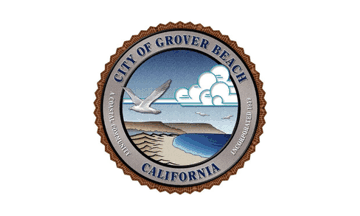
- Flag
- Motto: "A great place to spread your wings"
- Interactive map of Grover Beach, California
- Location in the United States
- Coordinates: 35°7′15″N 120°37′10″W
- Country: United States
- State: California
- County: San Luis Obispo
- Incorporated: December 21, 1959
- Named for: D.W. Grover

Government
  - Type: Council–manager
  - Body: Grover Beach City Council
  - Mayor: Kassi Dee
  - City Manager: Matthew Bronson
  - Council Members: List: • Mayor Pro Temp: Robert Robert; • Jules Tuggle; • Kathy McCorry-Driscoll; • Clint Weirick
  - Assemblymember: Dawn Addis (D)
  - State Senator: Monique Limón (D)

Area
  - Total: 2.32 sq mi (6.00 km^{2})
  - Land: 2.31 sq mi (5.99 km^{2})
  - Water: 0.0039 sq mi (0.01 km^{2}) 0.19%
- Elevation: 59 ft (18 m)

Population (2020)
  - Total: 12,701
  - Density: 5,493.5/sq mi (2,121.1/km^{2})
- Time zone: UTC-8 (Pacific)
  - Summer (DST): UTC-7 (PDT)
- ZIP codes: 93433, 93483
- Area code: 805
- FIPS code: 06-31393
- GNIS feature ID: 1652833
- Website: www.grover.org

Grover Beach is a city in San Luis Obispo County, California, United States. The population was 12,701 at the 2020 census, down from 13,156 in 2010. Grover Beach is the location of the Pacific Crossing 1 (PC-1) cable landing station, where trans-pacific submarine communications cables come ashore and connect to the North American telecommunication network.

== History ==
Grover Beach was originally known as Town of Grover, which was founded on August 1, 1887. The town was named for its founder, D. W. Grover.

Grover filed his plans at the San Luis Obispo County Court House and eventually founded what was to be known as City of Grover City. There was a popular vote that allowed incorporating on December 21, 1959, as City of Grover City. However, the name seemed redundant so some people sought better names, especially ocean-oriented names. In 1992, there was another popular vote, in which the town's name was officially changed from "City of Grover City" to "Grover Beach" to emphasize the seaside location.

== Geography ==
Grover Beach is part of the 5 Cities Metropolitan Area. The "5 Cities" includes 3 cities; Grover Beach, Pismo Beach, and Arroyo Grande along with Oceano and Shell Beach (part of Pismo Beach). The city extends from Arroyo Grande in the east to Pismo State Beach.

According to the United States Census Bureau, the city has a total area of 2.3 square miles (6.0 km^{2}), of which 99.81% is land and 0.19% is water.

=== Climate ===
This region experiences warm and dry summers, with no average monthly temperatures above 71.6 °F. According to the Köppen Climate Classification system, Grover Beach has a warm-summer Mediterranean climate, abbreviated "Csb" on climate maps.

Climate data for Grover Beach, California
Month	Jan	Feb	Mar	Apr	May	Jun	Jul	Aug	Sep	Oct	Nov	Dec	Year
Mean daily maximum °F (°C)	61.5 (16.4)	62.3 (16.8)	63.6 (17.6)	66.4 (19.1)	68.7 (20.4)	71.1 (21.7)	72.6 (22.6)	74.0 (23.3)	74.1 (23.4)	72.1 (22.3)	67.3 (19.6)	61.6 (16.4)	67.9 (19.9)
Mean daily minimum °F (°C)	42.9 (6.1)	44.3 (6.8)	45.6 (7.6)	46.7 (8.2)	48.8 (9.3)	51.8 (11.0)	54.3 (12.4)	54.7 (12.6)	54.1 (12.3)	51.1 (10.6)	46.6 (8.1)	42.3 (5.7)	48.6 (9.2)
Average precipitation inches (mm)	3.44 (87)	3.53 (90)	3.23 (82)	1.05 (27)	0.37 (9.4)	0.06 (1.5)	0.03 (0.76)	0.02 (0.51)	0.31 (7.9)	0.69 (18)	1.55 (39)	2.47 (63)	16.75 (426.07)
Source 1:
Source 2:

== Demographics ==
Historical population
Census	Pop.	Note	%±
1960	5,210		—
1970	5,939		14.0%
1980	8,827		48.6%
1990	11,656		32.0%
2000	13,067		12.1%
2010	13,156		0.7%
2020	12,701		−3.5%
2024 (est.)	12,534	▼	−1.3%
U.S. Decennial Census

=== 2020 census ===
As of the 2020 census, Grover Beach had a population of 12,701. The population density was 5,493.5 inhabitants per square mile (2,121.1/km^{2}). The median age was 41.5 years. 18.8% of residents were under the age of 18, and 18.1% were 65 years of age or older. For every 100 females, there were 95.1 males, and for every 100 females age 18 and over, there were 91.5 males age 18 and over.

The census reported that 99.1% of the population lived in households, 115 people (0.9%) lived in non-institutionalized group quarters, and no one was institutionalized. 100.0% of residents lived in urban areas, while 0.0% lived in rural areas.

There were 5,197 households, of which 26.7% had children under the age of 18 living in them. Of all households, 43.3% were married-couple households, 8.4% were cohabiting couple households, 19.2% were households with a male householder and no spouse or partner present, and 29.2% were households with a female householder and no spouse or partner present. About 27.4% of all households were made up of individuals, and 12.0% had someone living alone who was 65 years of age or older. The average household size was 2.42. There were 3,253 families (62.6% of all households).

There were 5,856 housing units at an average density of 2,532.9 units per square mile (978.0 units/km^{2}), of which 11.3% were vacant. A total of 5,197 units (88.7%) were occupied; of these, 50.3% were owner-occupied and 49.7% were occupied by renters. The homeowner vacancy rate was 1.2%, and the rental vacancy rate was 3.4%.

Racial composition as of the 2020 census
Race	Number	Percent
White	8,099	63.8%
Black or African American	168	1.3%
American Indian and Alaska Native	196	1.5%
Asian	536	4.2%
Native Hawaiian and Other Pacific Islander	23	0.2%
Some other race	1,512	11.9%
Two or more races	2,167	17.1%
Hispanic or Latino (of any race)	3,979	31.3%

=== 2023 ACS 5-year estimates ===
In 2023, the US Census Bureau estimated that 12.2% of the population were foreign-born. Of all people aged 5 or older, 71.9% spoke only English at home, 25.3% spoke Spanish, 0.6% spoke other Indo-European languages, 1.3% spoke Asian or Pacific Islander languages, and 0.8% spoke other languages. Of those aged 25 or older, 83.1% were high school graduates and 26.9% had a bachelor's degree.

The median household income in 2023 was $82,534, and the per capita income was $41,607. About 10.4% of families and 12.7% of the population were below the poverty line.

=== 2010 census ===
At the 2010 census, Grover Beach had a population of 13,156. The population density was 5,684.2 inhabitants per square mile (2,194.7/km^{2}). The racial makeup of Grover Beach was 9,964 (75.7%) White, 146 (1.1%) African American, 186 (1.4%) Native American, 542 (4.1%) Asian, 35 (0.3%) Pacific Islander, 1,582 (12.0%) from other races, and 701 (5.3%) from two or more races. Hispanic or Latino of any race were 3,840 persons (29.2%).

The census reported that 12,967 people (98.6% of the population) lived in households, 185 (1.4%) lived in non-institutionalized group quarters, and 4 (0.0%) were institutionalized.

There were 5,111 households, 1,656 (32.4%) had children under the age of 18 living in them, 2,178 (42.6%) were opposite-sex married couples living together, 735 (14.4%) had a female householder with no husband present, 335 (6.6%) had a male householder with no wife present. There were 428 (8.4%) unmarried opposite-sex partnerships, and 54 (1.1%) same-sex married couples or partnerships. 1,330 households (26.0%) were one person and 439 (8.6%) had someone living alone who was 65 or older. The average household size was 2.54. There were 3,248 families (63.5% of households); the average family size was 3.04.

The age distribution was 2,928 people (22.3%) under the age of 18, 1,264 people (9.6%) aged 18 to 24, 3,809 people (29.0%) aged 25 to 44, 3,603 people (27.4%) aged 45 to 64, and 1,552 people (11.8%) who were 65 or older. The median age was 36.9 years. For every 100 females, there were 95.7 males. For every 100 females aged 18 and over, there were 93.6 males.

There were 5,748 housing units at an average density of 2,483.5 per square mile, of the occupied units 2,390 (46.8%) were owner-occupied and 2,721 (53.2%) were rented. The homeowner vacancy rate was 2.0%; the rental vacancy rate was 3.7%. 5,719 people (43.5% of the population) lived in owner-occupied housing units and 7,248 people (55.1%) lived in rental housing units.

== Government ==
In the California State Legislature, Grover Beach is in the 21st senatorial district, represented by Democrat Monique Limón, and in the 30th Assembly district, represented by Democrat Dawn Addis.

In the United States House of Representatives, Grover Beach is in California's 24th congressional district, represented by Democrat Salud Carbajal.

== Transportation ==
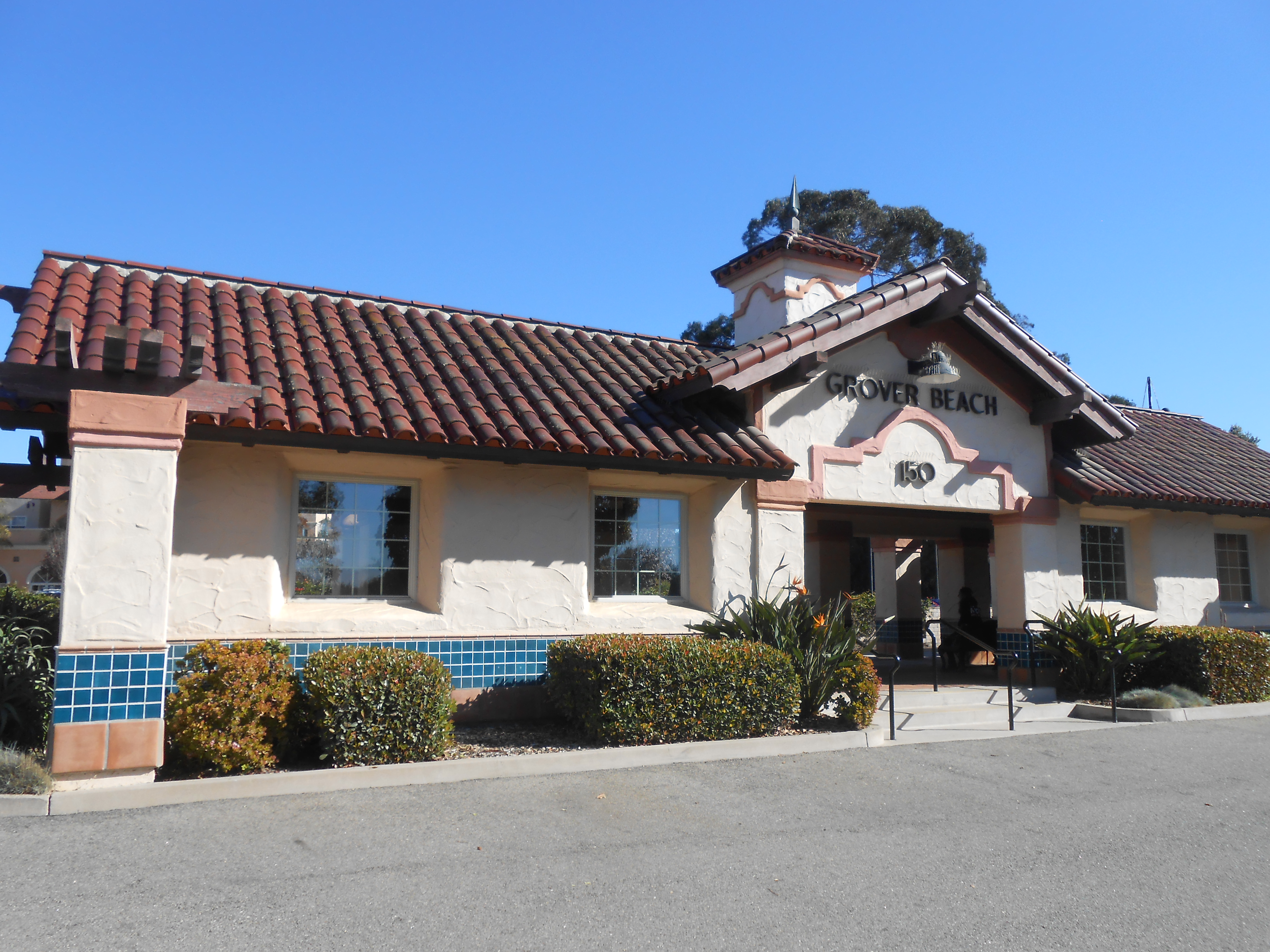
Grover Beach Amtrak

The Grover Beach station is the only rail station in the five cities area, and is located at the intersection of Grand Avenue and State Highway 1, adjacent to Pismo State Beach.

Amtrak Thruway 18 provides a daily connection to Visalia on the east, and Santa Maria on the west, with several stops in between. These buses depart from the stop situated directly across the tracks. A recent expansion of the station has moved the bus stop to the west side of the tracks, adjacent to the station building.

San Luis Obispo Regional Transit Authority operates additional bus lines that run from Grover Beach to most cities in San Luis Obispo county, as well as Santa Maria.

== Education ==
Grover Beach is served by the Lucia Mar Unified School District.
