= Karsan J10 =

Turkish minibus

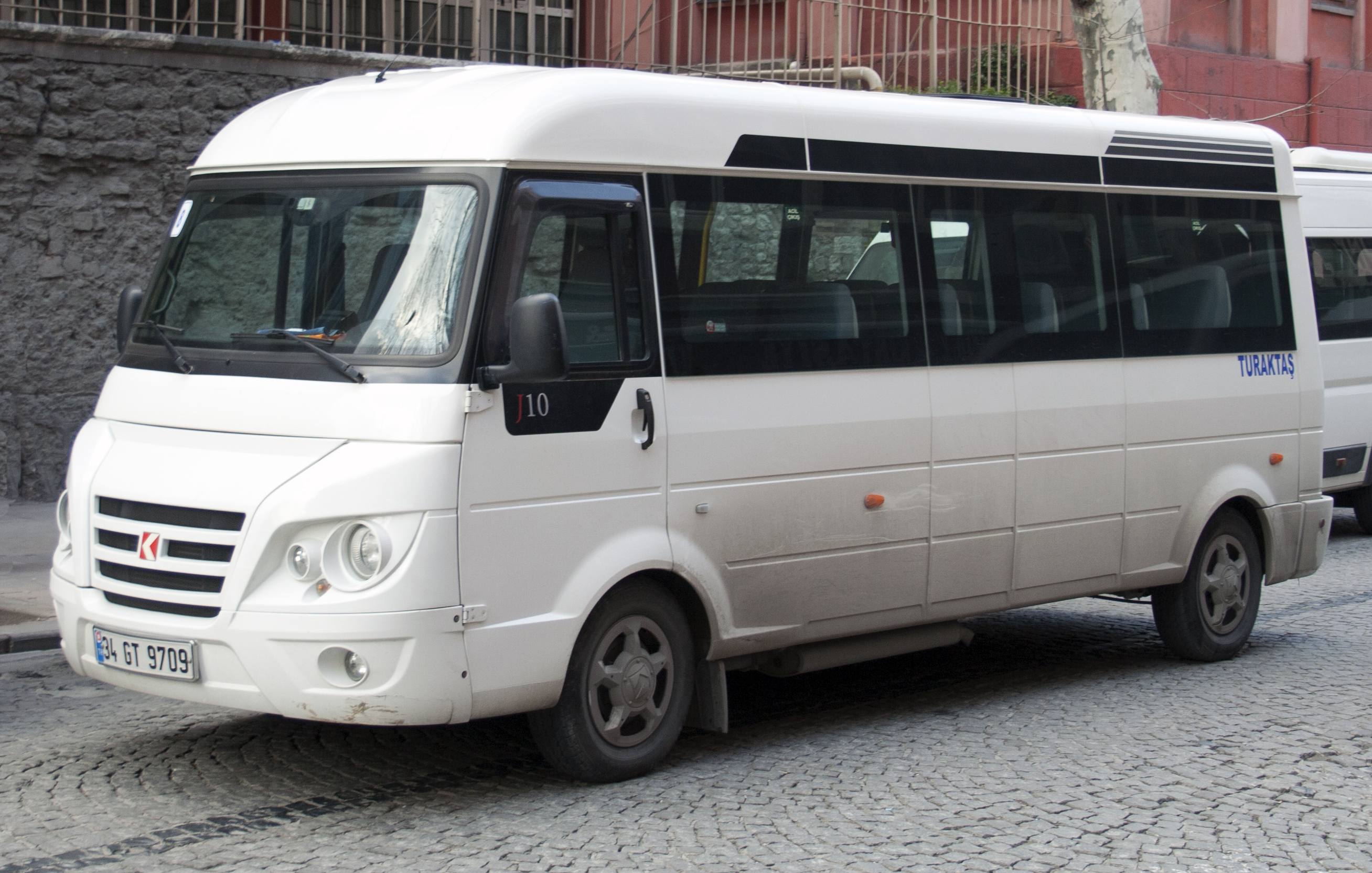

Overview
- Manufacturer: Karsan
- Production: 2010–2015
- Assembly: Akçalar, Turkey
- Designer: Karsan

Body and chassis
- Class: Minibus
- Body style: 4-door minibus
- Layout: Front-engine, rear-wheel drive

Powertrain
- Engine: 2.3 L turbodiesel I4; 2.8 L turbodiesel I4
- Transmission: 5-speed manual

Dimensions
- Wheelbase: 3,300 mm (129.9 in); 3,860 mm (152.0 in)
- Length: 5,712 mm (224.9 in); 6,272 mm (246.9 in)
- Width: 1,950 mm (76.8 in)
- Height: 2,467 mm (97.1 in)
- Curb weight: 2,634–2,749 kg (5,807–6,061 lb)

Chronology
- Predecessor: Karsan J9 Premier
- Successor: Karsan Jest

The Karsan J10 is a minibus produced by the Turkish commercial vehicles manufacturer Karsan from 2010 to 2015.

== Overview ==
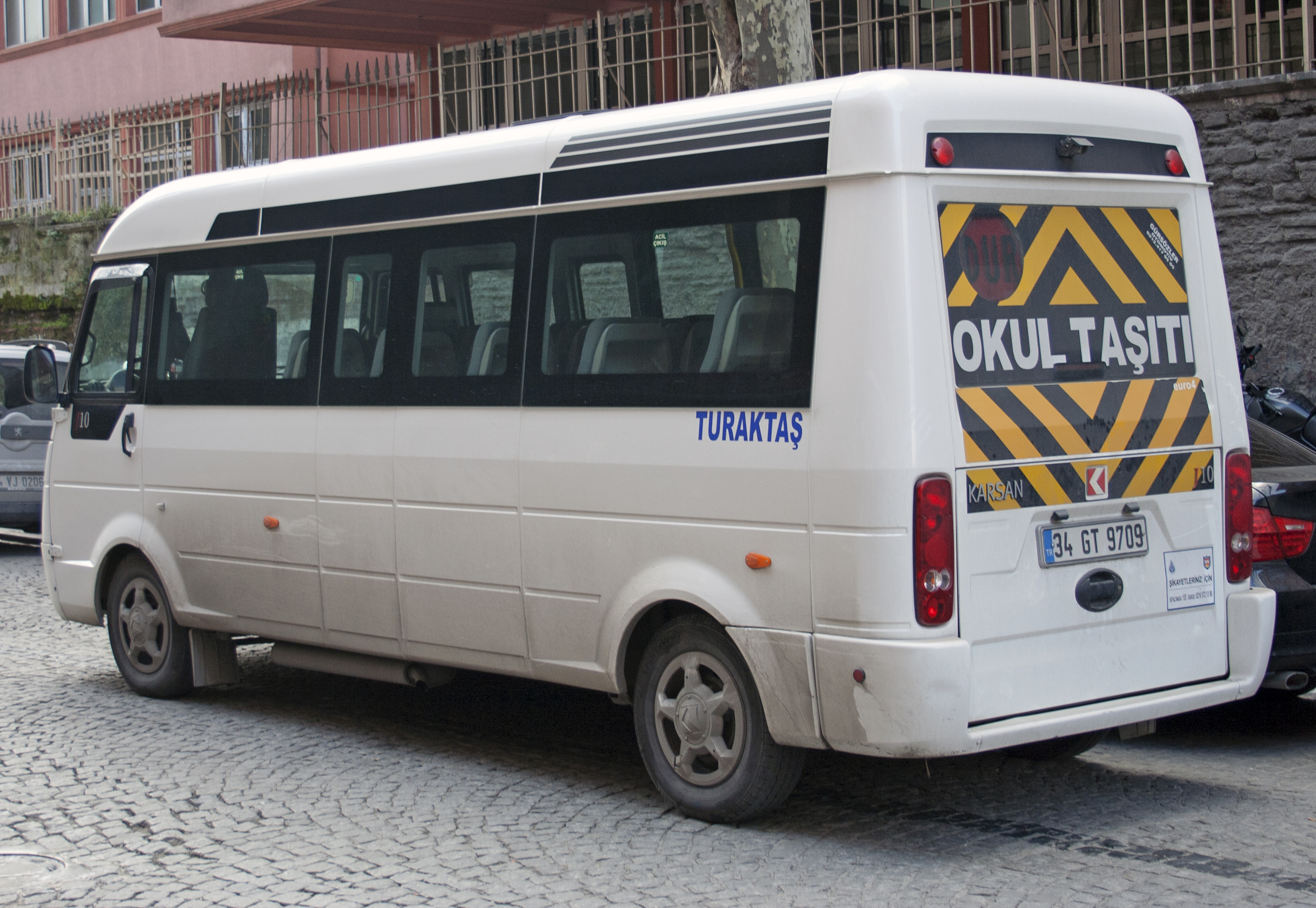
Karsan J10 rear; this example is used as a schoolbus

It is the successor of the Karsan J9 Premier that was based on the platform of the 1980s' Peugeot J9. It is available in three capacity versions, with 14, 17 or 20 seats, and is powered by a 2.3-liter common rail engine from Iveco, developing 96 hp (71 kW) and 240 N⋅m (180 lb⋅ft). Two length options are available, 3.3 metres (10.8 ft) or 3.8 metres (12.5 ft), both with a GVWR between 4.1 and 4.3 tonnes. Standard equipment includes ABS, EBD, automatic rear doors, sunroof, electric windows, central locking and optional, air conditioning.
