= PC-1 =

Submarine telecommunications cable system

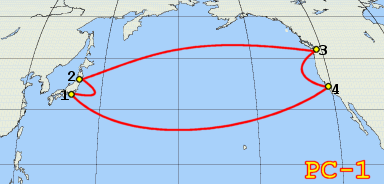

PC-1 (Pacific Crossing 1) is a submarine telecommunications cable system in the North Pacific Ocean linking the United States to Japan.

It has landing points in:

1. Shima, Mie Prefecture, Japan
2. Ajigaura, Hitachinaka, Ibaraki Prefecture, Japan
3. Harbour Pointe, Snohomish County, Washington, United States
4. Grover Beach, San Luis Obispo County, California, United States

It has a design transmission capacity of 640 Gbit/s, with 180 Gbit/s lit (as of February 2006), and a total cable length of 20,890 km. It started operation in January 2001.

Since 2009, PC-1 has been owned by Japanese carrier NTT.
