= Peugeot J9 =

Type of French van

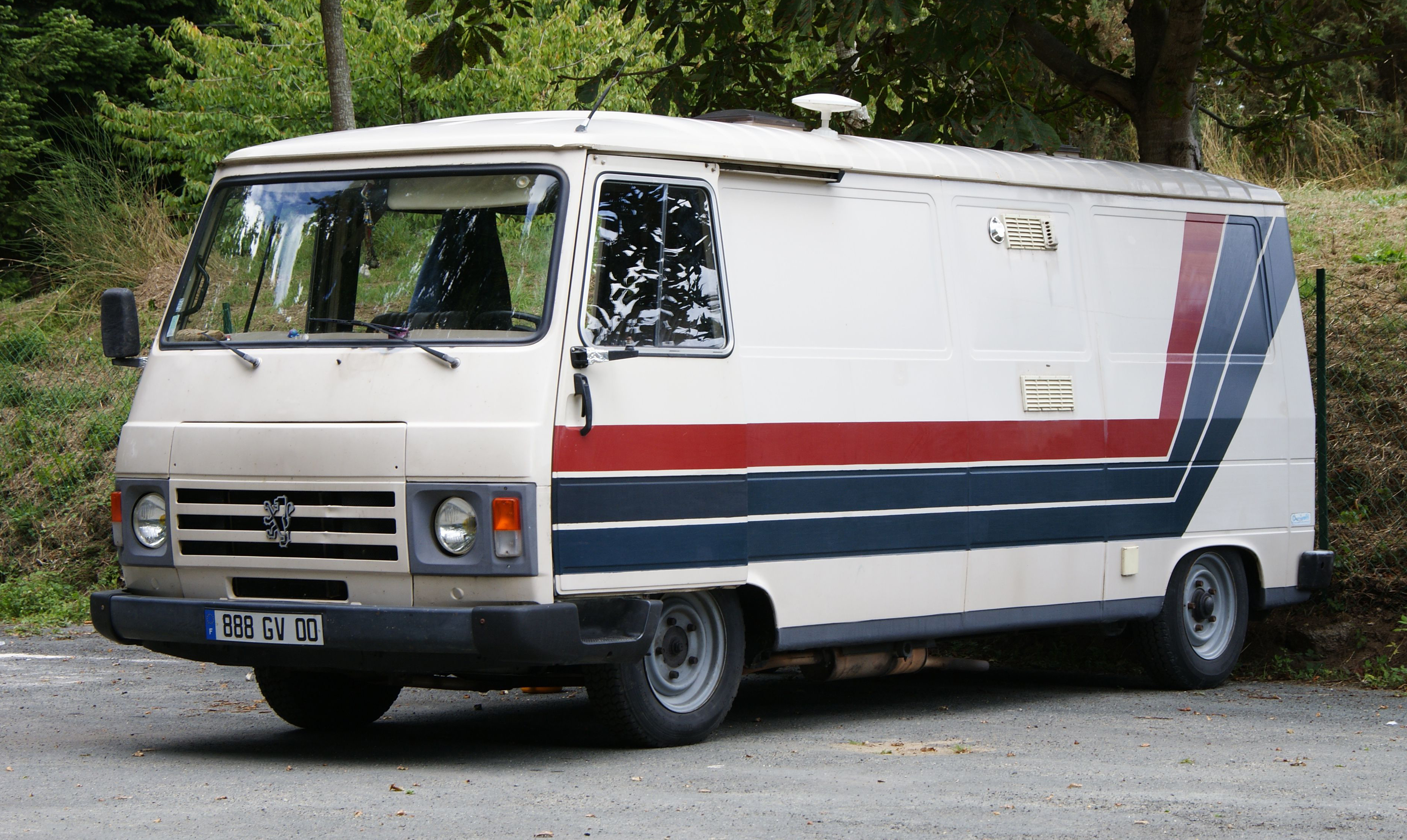

Overview
- Manufacturer: Peugeot
- Also called: Karsan J9 Premier
- Production: 1981–1991; 1981–2010 (Turkey)
- Assembly: France; Turkey (Karsan)

Body and chassis
- Class: Light commercial vehicle
- Body style: Van/Minibus
- Layout: FF layout

Powertrain
- Transmission: 5-speed manual

Dimensions
- Wheelbase: 2,270 mm (89.4 in)
- Length: 4,732 mm (186.3 in)
- Width: 2,034 mm (80.1 in)
- Height: 2,300 mm (90.6 in)
- Curb weight: 1,500–1,690 kg (3,307–3,726 lb)

Chronology
- Predecessor: Peugeot J7; Dodge SpaceVan
- Successor: Peugeot J5; Karsan J10

The Peugeot J9 is a van manufactured by Peugeot from January 1981 until 1991. It was also manufactured under license by commercial vehicles manufacturer Karsan in Turkey, from 1981 until 2010. After a facelift in 1991, in 2006, Karsan released the restyled J9 Premier. Production ended in 2010 when the J9 was replaced by the closely related Karsan J10.

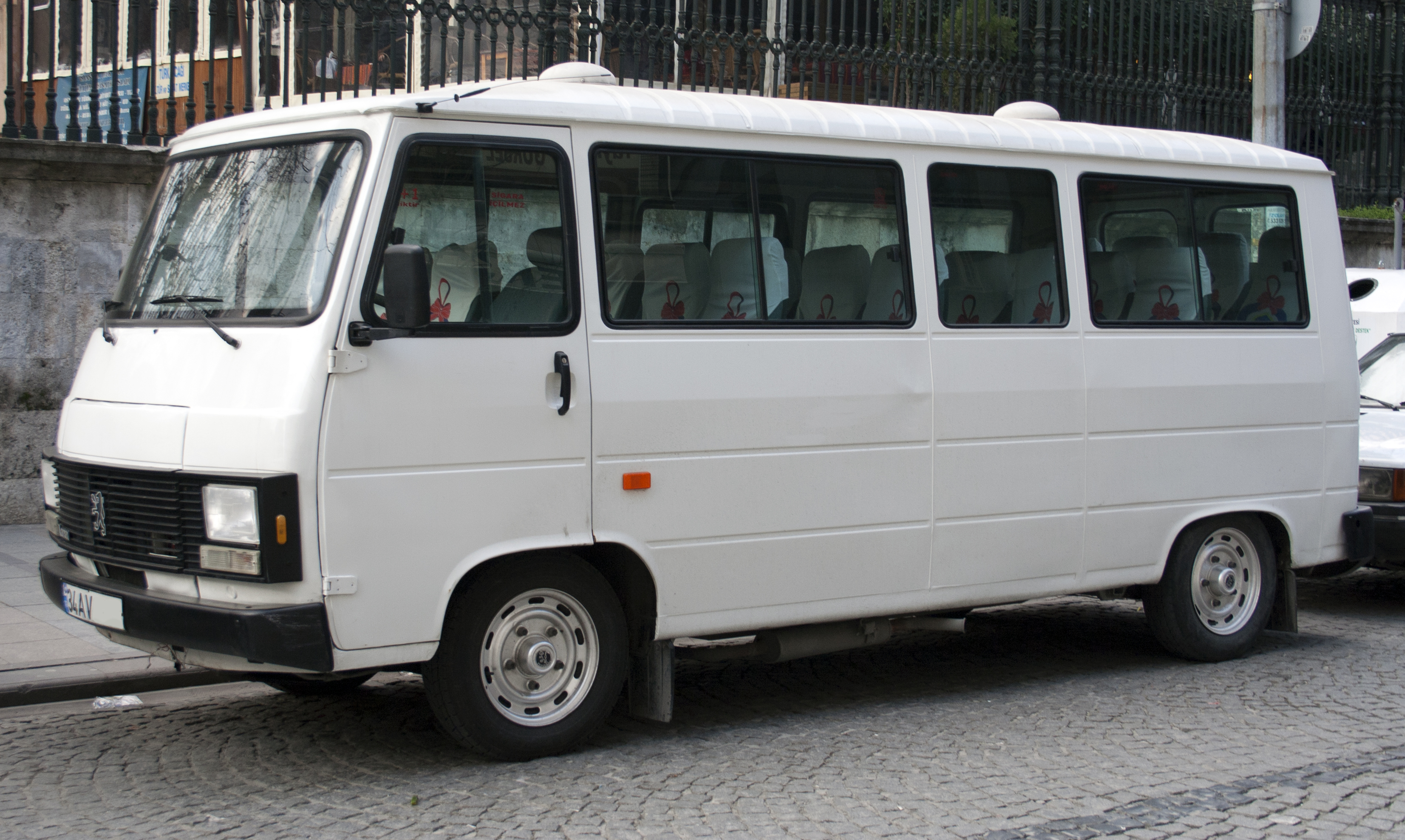
1991-2006 Peugeot J9 facelift

When first introduced, the J9 had 1.6 or 2.0 litre petrol engines, or the Indenor diesel engines of 2.1 or 2.3 litres. Late in the French production run, the 2.5 litre diesel engine also became available.

== Electric prototype ==
In 1988, a few electric J9 19-seat busses were used in the city of Tours during a mass testing of electric vehicles by PSA during the 1980s and 90s. It is likely that these busses used similar technology to the later production version of the Peugeot J5 Electrique.
