= Peugeot J7 =

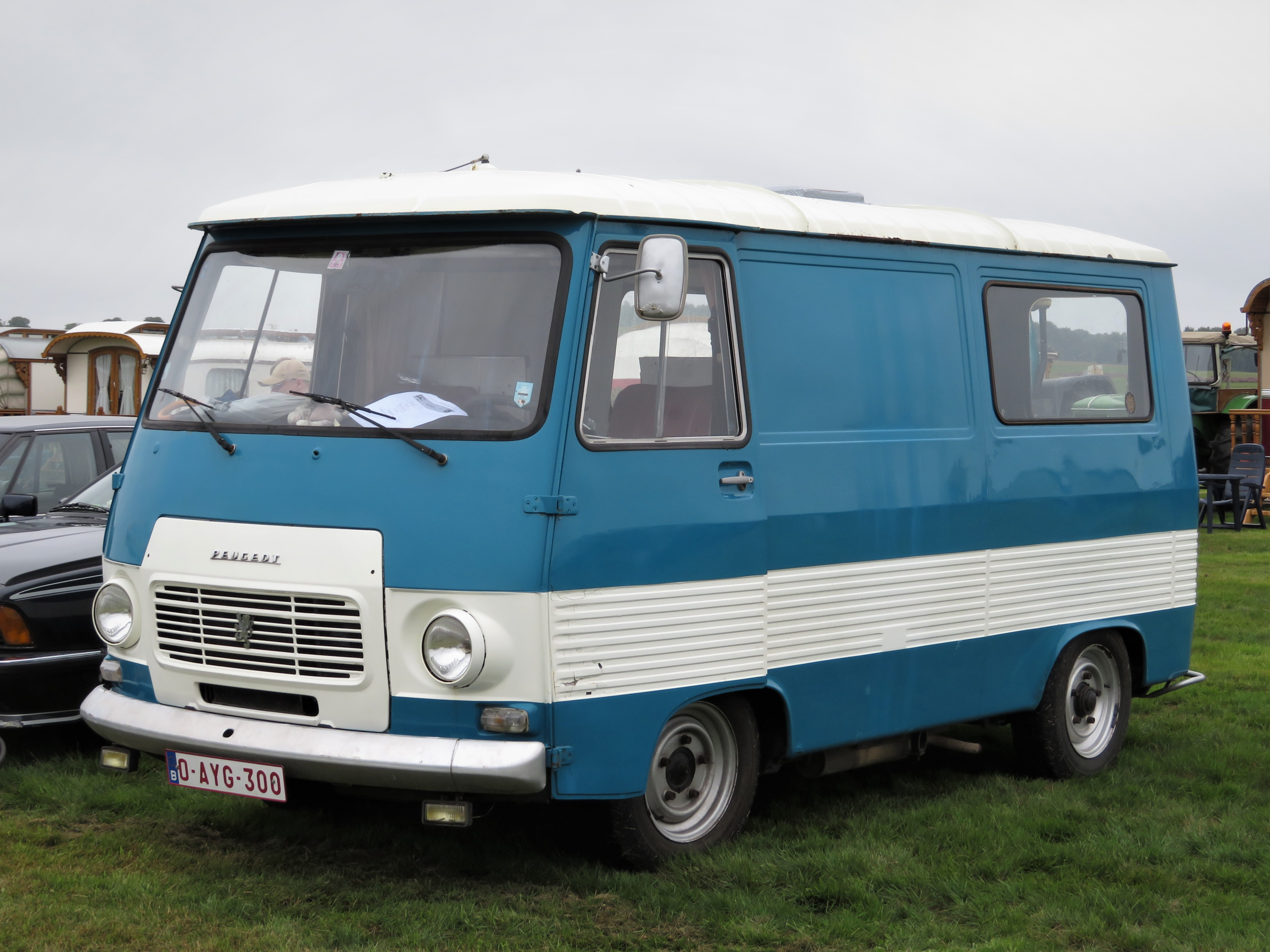

Overview
- Manufacturer: Peugeot
- Production: 1965–1980

Body and chassis
- Class: Light commercial vehicle
- Body style: Van

Dimensions
- Length: 4,740 mm (186.6 in)
- Width: 2,000 mm (78.7 in)

Chronology
- Predecessor: Peugeot D4
- Successor: Peugeot J9

The Peugeot J7 is a small front wheel drive van produced from 1965 until 1980 with a total production of 336,220 vehicles. In 1981 the J7 was succeeded by a revised version called J9.

The J7 was available in a number of versions including panel van, minibus, pick up and pick up with cab with a gross payload of either 1,400 kg (3,100 lb) or 1,800 kg (4,000 lb) depending on version. The J7 was originally launched with a choice of 4-cylinder petrol (1468 cc) or diesel (1816 cc) engines. The J7 was not sold in the United Kingdom, but various private imports have occurred over the years.
