= Guadalupe station =

Railway station in Guadalupe, California

Guadalupe, CA
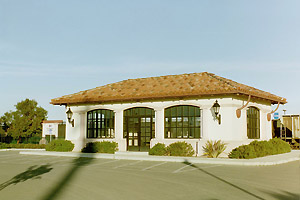
- Guadalupe station building in 2001

General information
- Location: 330 Guadalupe Street (Highway 1); Guadalupe, California; United States
- Coordinates: 34°57′46″N 120°34′24″W
- Owner: Union Pacific Railroad
- Line: UP Santa Barbara Subdivision
- Platforms: 1 side platform
- Tracks: 1 main track; 5 yard tracks
- Connections: Guadalupe Flyer

Construction
- Parking: Yes
- Accessible: Yes

Other information
- Status: Unstaffed, station building with waiting room
- Station code: Amtrak: GUA

History
- Opened: July 1998

Passengers
- FY 2025: 12,287 (Amtrak)

Services
Preceding station	Amtrak	Following station
Grover Beach toward San Luis Obispo	Pacific Surfliner	Lompoc–Surf toward San Diego
Coast Starlight does not stop here
Former services
Preceding station	Southern Pacific Railroad	Following station
Arroyo Grande toward San Francisco	Coast Line	Casmalia toward Los Angeles
Terminus	Guadalupe – Santa Maria	Santa Maria Terminus
Location

Guadalupe station (also known as Guadalupe–Santa Maria) is an Amtrak train station in the city of Guadalupe, California. The station primarily serves the larger city of Santa Maria, located 8 miles (13 km) to the east.

Guadalupe station is served by 4 Amtrak Pacific Surfliner trains (2 in each direction).

In fiscal year 2025, 12,287 passengers boarded or detrained at Guadalupe station.

== History ==
Service to the station began in July 1998. A new station was built to replace the former structure, which was demolished around 1974. The new station was built in a Spanish Colonial Revival style featuring a barrel red-tiled roof and white stuccoed walls, similar to that of older train stations in Southern California. The San Diegan was renamed Pacific Surfliner in 2000.
