= Karsana =

Town in Nigeria

Karsana is a town in the Federal Capital Territory in Nigeria. It is an affluent bedroom community of Abuja, primarily composed of newly built wealthy and middle class Americanized homes, condos, and apartments. Karsana is divided into four neighborhoods which are Karsana East, Karsana West, Karsana South, and Karsana North. Karsana East is the most developed area of the city. According to the bygone German population website World Gazetteer the population is 194,435 as of 2013. The population is likely to be higher these days as Abuja and its suburbs continue to have population growth rates. Karsana lies at 9.15°N and 7.34°E and is located 15 kilometres (9.3 miles) southwest of the Nnamdi Azikiwe International Airport, and is located north west of Abuja's city center.

== History ==
Karsana was built as a result of Abuja's continuing rapid population growth, which results from when Abuja was built and developed to replace Lagos as Nigeria's capital in 1991. The areas of and surrounding Abuja are also labelled as different phase areas as way of planning development in the Federal Capital Territory with Karsana being phase 4. Phase 4 was until recently considered as seeing little construction, but that has been changing rapidly.
