= Karsan Jest =

Turkish low-floor minibus

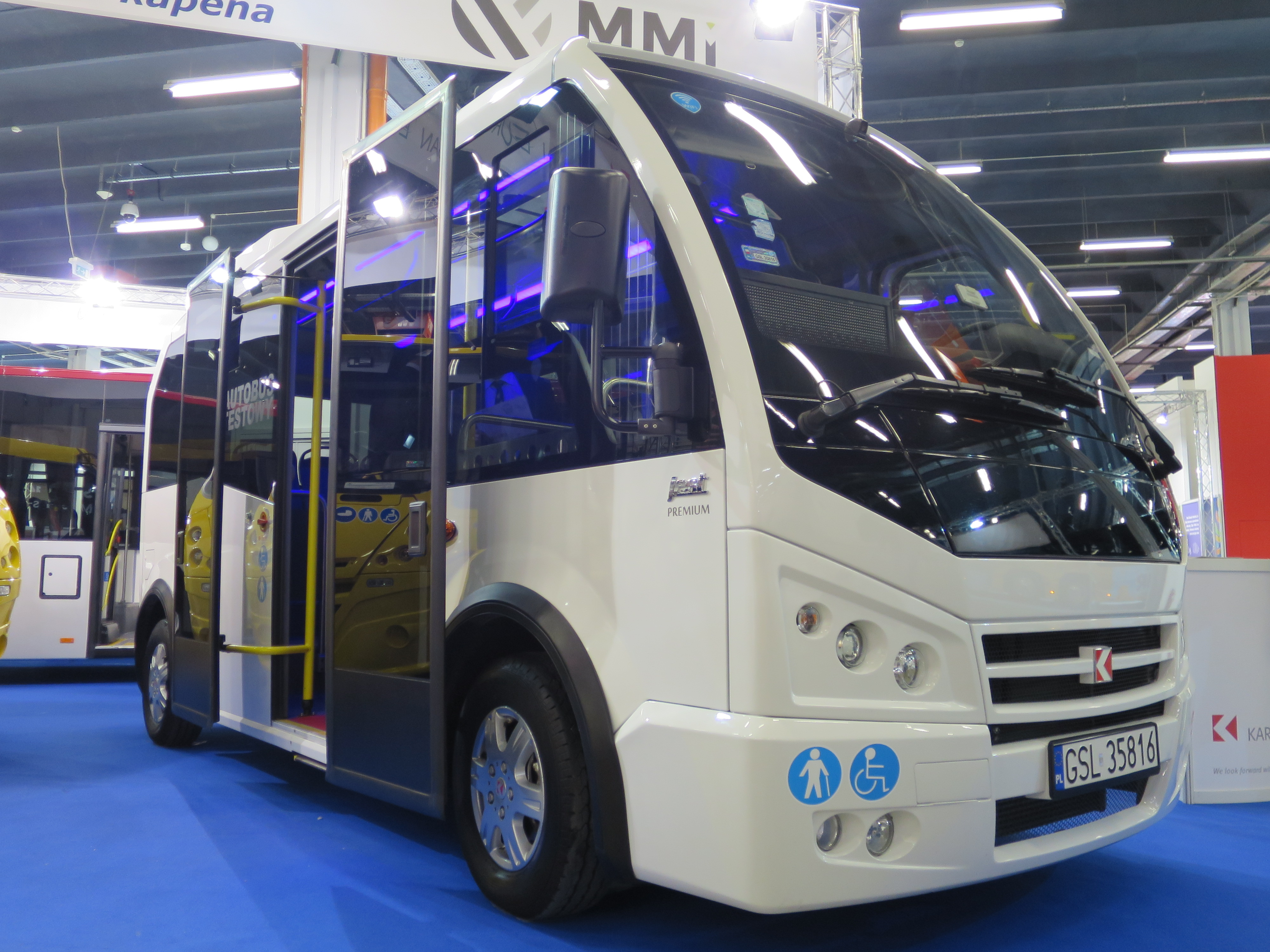

Overview
- Type: Minibus
- Manufacturer: Karsan
- Production: 2013–present
- Designer: Hexagon Studio

Powertrain
- Engine: 2.3L
- Transmission: 6-speed

Dimensions
- Length: 5,845 mm (230.1 in)
- Width: 2,055 mm (80.9 in)
- Height: With air conditioning 2,800 mm (110 in); Without air conditioning 2,630 mm (104 in)

The Karsan Jest is a low-floor minibus produced by Turkish automobile company Karsan.

== History ==
The Karsan Jest started production in 2013. It was designed by Karsan affiliate Hexagon Studio. Production is based in Bursa, Akçalar. 70% of the parts in the bus are produced in Turkey.

== Engine ==
The Karsan Jest's engine is diesel. The engine is a front-wheel drive, Common Rail, four cylinder, 2.3 liters, 129 horsepower and produces 320 Nm energy. It also has a variant with automated manual transmission. It seats 12 to 20 passengers depending on the specific configuration, the variant with 11 fixed and 4 foldable seats is the standard, all other seating configurations are produced on request.

== Features ==
An optional version of the bus includes wifi. The bus has a total of 5 seating options. A ramp for disabled people to get off and on the bus is available.
