= San Luis Obispo Regional Transit Authority =

- Founded: 1989
- Headquarters: 253 Elks Lane
- Locale: San Luis Obispo, California
- Service area: San Luis Obispo County, California
- Service type: bus service, paratransit
- Routes: 11
- Fleet: 32 buses
- Fuel type: diesel, CNG, battery electric
- Website: RTA SoCoTransit

The San Luis Obispo Regional Transit Authority is the provider of intercity mass transportation in San Luis Obispo County, California, with service between most cities in the county: Arroyo Grande, Atascadero, Paso Robles, Grover Beach, Morro Bay, Pismo Beach, Cambria, San Simeon, Los Osos, Cayucos, and San Luis Obispo. Hourly routes operate Monday - Friday, with limited Saturday & Sunday service. The base travel fare is $1.75-$3.25 each way, or a Regional day pass may be purchased for $5.50, good for unlimited trips on all fixed-routes in the county. Fares on South County Transit (SoCoTransit) and Paso Robles routes are $1.50 each, and a $3 day pass specifically for SoCoTransit routes, is available for purchase. Discounts for seniors and children are available on South County Transit and Paso Robles routes. Five routes are branded as part of the SLORTA (9, 10, 12, 14, and 15). Additionally, RTA operates fixed route transit service in Paso Robles and the Five Cities Area for South County Transit (Routes 21, 24, 27, & 28) and the Avila Beach Trolley on a seasonal/summer runs. Most RTA routes have limited service on Saturday and Sunday and normally run hourly.

== Routes ==
=== RTA routes ===
| Route | Terminals | | Via | Notes |
|---|---|---|---|---|
| A | Paso Robles North County Transit Center | | Spring St | Clockwise route |
| B | Paso Robles North County Transit Center | | Niblick Rd | Counter-clockwise route |
| 9 | San Miguel Mission St &14th St | San Luis Obispo Government Center | SR 101, El Camino Real | |
| 10 | Santa Maria Santa Maria Transit Center | San Luis Obispo Government Center | SR 101 | Serves Allan Hancock College |
| 12 | San Luis Obispo Government Center | | Cabrillo Hwy | Serves Cuesta College; Loop route |
| 15 | San Simeon Hearst Castle Visitors Center | Morro Bay Morro Bay Park | Cabrillo Hwy | |

=== SoCoTransit routes ===
| Route | Terminals | | Via | Notes |
|---|---|---|---|---|
| 21 | Pismo Beach Premium Outlets | | James wy | Clockwise route |
| 24 | Pismo Beach Premium Outlets | | Grand Av | Counter-clockwise route |
| 27 | Grover Beach Ramona Garden | | Oak Park Bl | Clockwise route (Weekdays Only) |
| 28 | Grover Beach Ramona Garden | | 13th St | Counter-clockwise route |
| Avila-Pismo Beach Trolley | Avila Beach Port San Luis | Pismo Beach Premium Outlets | SR 101 | The Avila-Pismo Beach Trolley will run May 3 - September 1; Friday afternoons and weekends |
