= Karsan =

Turkish commercial vehicles manufacturer

Karsan Otomotiv Sanayi ve Ticaret A.Ş.
- Type: Joint-stock company
- Traded as: BİST: KARSN
- Industry: Manufacturing
- Founded: 1966; 60 years ago
- Headquarters: Akçalar, Bursa, Turkey
- Area served: Worldwide
- Key people: İnan Kıraç (Chairman); Muzaffer Arpacıoğlu (Deputy General Manager of Business Affairs); Okan Baş (CEO)
- Products: Automobiles, commercial vehicles and electric bus
- Revenue: $480 million USD (2013)
- Number of employees: 2,400
- Parent: Kıraça Group
- Website: www.karsan.com/en

Karsan (Turkish: Karsan Otomotiv Sanayii ve Ticaret A.Ş.; Karsan Automotive Industry and Trade Joint-Stock Company) is a Turkish commercial vehicles manufacturer, based in Akçalar, Nilüfer, Bursa. "Karsan" is an acronym for "Karoseri Sanayii" (Carrosserie-Bodyworks Industry).

== Timeline ==
1. The journey began with 269 independent entrepreneurs in the year 1966.
2. In the first 15 years of the journey Karsan manufactured bus bodies in various sizes for automotive companies.
3. In the year 1979, the majority of shares were bought by Koç Holding.
4. In the year 1981, manufacturing for the J9 minibuses began in an agreement with Peugeot. It lasted for 30 years.
5. In the year 1997, manufacturing for Turkey's first minivan began in collaboration with Peugeot.
6. In the year 1999, the factory in Hasanağa reaches a manufacturing capacity of 65.000 vehicles/year.
7. In the year 2006, the first 100% self-made vehicle, the J9 Premier, began manufacturing.
8. In the year 2007, Karsan established strategic alliances with Hyundai, Renault and Citroën. Karsan also began manufacturing for the Hyundai HD Light-Duty Trucks.
9. In the year 2008, the 100.000th J9 Premier was produced. In this year the manufacturing for the Renault Trucks Premium and Citroën Berlingo also began.
10. In the year 2009, the vision of the company was updated to "Limitless Transportation Solutions". In the same year, Karsan developed the V1 project in response to New York's Taxi of Tomorrow tender, Karsan Pazarlama was established and Renault Trucks Premium Lander and Kerax were presented.
11. In the year 2011, bus manufacturing began, the first big bus was manufactured for Rome.
12. In the year 2012, an agreement was signed with IETT for 450 buses, later the agreement's quantity was increased to 540.
13. In the year 2013, the products portfolio was updated to Karsan's own vehicles, Jest, Atak and Star.
14. In the year 2015, production for Hyundai H350 began.
15. In the year 2016, Karsan was pre-qualified in the US Postal Service's new generation delivery vehicle tender which was opened on 25 May 2015, placing it among 6 companies to produce prototypes for testing.
16. In the year 2017, Jest+ was relaunched with an esthetic look and enhanced features.
17. In the year 2018 , the first electric vehicle, e-JEST, which is electrified by BMW i, was launched in cooperation with BMW.
18. In the year 2019, the second electric vehicle was launched, the e-ATAK.
19. In the year 2021, the Autonomous e-ATAK, the first serial-production Level 4 Automated bus of Europe and America, the e-ATA 10, 12 and 18, were launched. In the same year Karsan signed a 5-year contract with Oyak Renault for the production of Megane Sedan models.
20. In the year 2023, Karsan has become the first European electric bus brand to enter the Japanese market with its right-hand drive e-JEST model.
21. In the year 2024, Karsan has entered into the UK market with its right-hand drive e-JEST model.

== Current models ==
Autonomous e-ATAK at Busworld Europe 2023

=== Electric traditional bus models ===
- e-ATA (Hydrogen, LE, 10, 12, 18)
- e-ATAK
- e-JEST

=== Electric autonomous bus models ===
- Autonomous e-ATAK

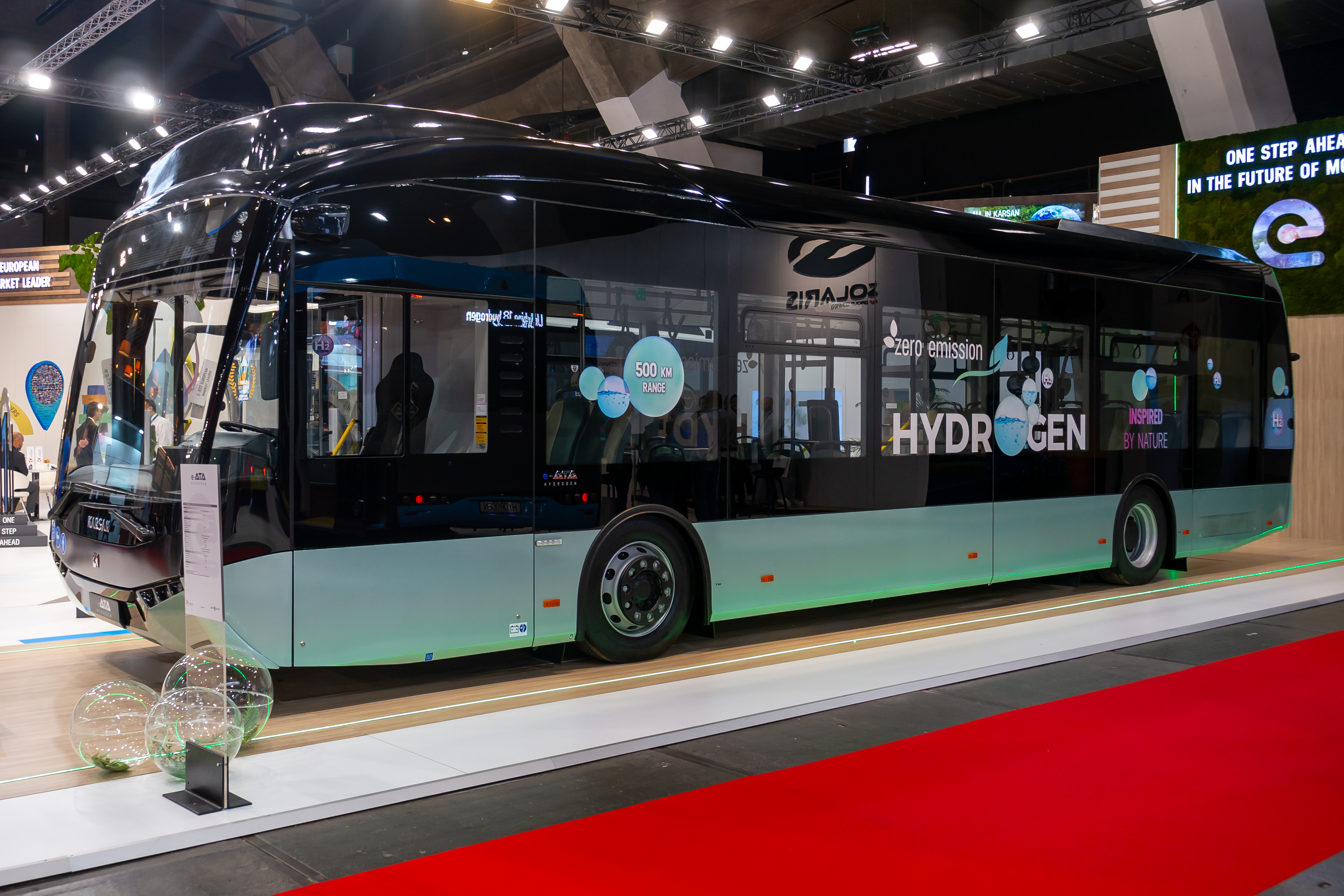
e-ATA Hydrogen at Busworld Europe 2023

- Autonomous e-JEST

=== Diesel traditional bus models ===
- ATAK
- JEST
- STAR

=== Other ===
- Peugeot Boxer (2001–present)
- Fiat Ducato (2001–present)
- Hyundai Truck (2007–present)
- BredaMenarinibus Vivacity (2010–present)
- BredaMenarinibus Avancity (2010–present)
- Menarinibus CITYMOOD (2014–present)
- Karsan V-1 (prototype)
- Hyundai H350 (2015–present)
- Renault Megane IV Sedan (2022–present)

== Former models ==
- Peugeot J9 (1981–2006)
- Peugeot Partner (1997–2013)
- Karsan J9 Premier (2006–2010)
- Citroën Berlingo (2008–2013)
- Renault Premium (2008–2013)
- Renault Kerax (2009–2013)
- Karsan J10 (2010–2015)

== See also ==
- List of automobile manufacturers
- Automotive industry in Turkey
- List of companies of Turkey
- Taxicabs of New York City
