= Richard M. Eakin =

American zoologist

- Eakin as Gregor Mendel, demonstrating genetic inheritance in pea plants circa 1974
- Born: Richard Marshall Eakin; May 5, 1910; Florence, Colorado
- Died: November 25, 1999 (aged 89); Danville, California
- Education: UC Berkeley
- Known for: Impersonating famous scientists, Parietal eye research
- Spouses: Mary Mulford (1935–1980; 3 children); Barbara Nichols (?–1999)
- Awards: Guggenheim Fellowship (1953)
- Scientific career
- Fields: Zoology, Embryology
- Workplaces: UC Berkeley
- Doctoral advisor: J. Franklin Daniel

Richard Marshall Eakin (/ˈeɪkɪn/ AY-kin; May 5, 1910 – November 25, 1999), was an American zoologist and professor at the University of California, Berkeley. He was widely known for portraying prominent historical scientists during some of his lectures; dressing in costume and speaking in character to entertain and inform his students. A 1953 Guggenheim fellow, he wrote several books and more than 200 scientific papers. His research focused on eyes and vision in animals, especially the parietal eye or "third eye" of vertebrates, as well as animal embryology. He served as chairman of the UC Berkeley Department of Zoology for over 10 years, was elected president of the Western Society of Naturalists and American Society of Zoologists, and was a fellow of the California Academy of Sciences.

Eakin was born in Florence, Colorado, and grew up in Tulsa, Oklahoma. He initially studied at the University of Tulsa, planning a career in the clergy, before switching to zoology, earning a bachelor's degree and doctorate at UC Berkeley. After postdoctoral studies in Germany under Hans Spemann he returned to UC Berkeley as a faculty member, where he would teach for over 40 years, earning awards and recognition for his teaching before retiring with highest faculty honors.

== Early life and education (1910–1936) ==
Richard Eakin was born on May 5, 1910, in Florence, Colorado, to parents Marshall and Mary Elizabeth Eakin. He attended high school in Tulsa, Oklahoma, graduating in 1927. He initially planned to go into the clergy, enrolling in the University of Tulsa and studying subjects such as theology and Greek for two years, before deciding to pursue zoology.

In 1929, Eakin moved to Berkeley, California to attend UC Berkeley. He earned his A.B. in 1931, then enrolled in graduate school under J. Franklin Daniel, an ichthyologist and embryologist. For his dissertation, Eakin studied the development of salamander and frog embryos, earning a PhD in zoology in 1935. From 1935 to 1936 he worked in Germany as a postdoctoral scholar in the laboratories of embryologists Otto Mangold and Nobel laureate Hans Spemann.

On August 8, 1935, Eakin married Mary Mulford, daughter of Walter Mulford, a Berkeley professor of forestry.

== Career (1936–1977) ==
Upon his return to UC Berkeley in 1936, Eakin was appointed instructor of zoology, becoming assistant professor in 1940 and full professor in 1949. He was assistant dean of the College of Letters and Science from 1940 to 1943, and chairman of the Department of Zoology from 1942 to 1948, and again from 1952 to 1957. As an administrator he helped found the university's Bodega Marine Laboratory, Sagehen Creek Field Station, and Cancer Research Genetics Laboratory. In 1956 he published a history of zoological research at Berkeley spanning the period from the university's 1868 founding through 1956, followed by a 1988 companion article covering the intervening 32 years.

=== Research ===
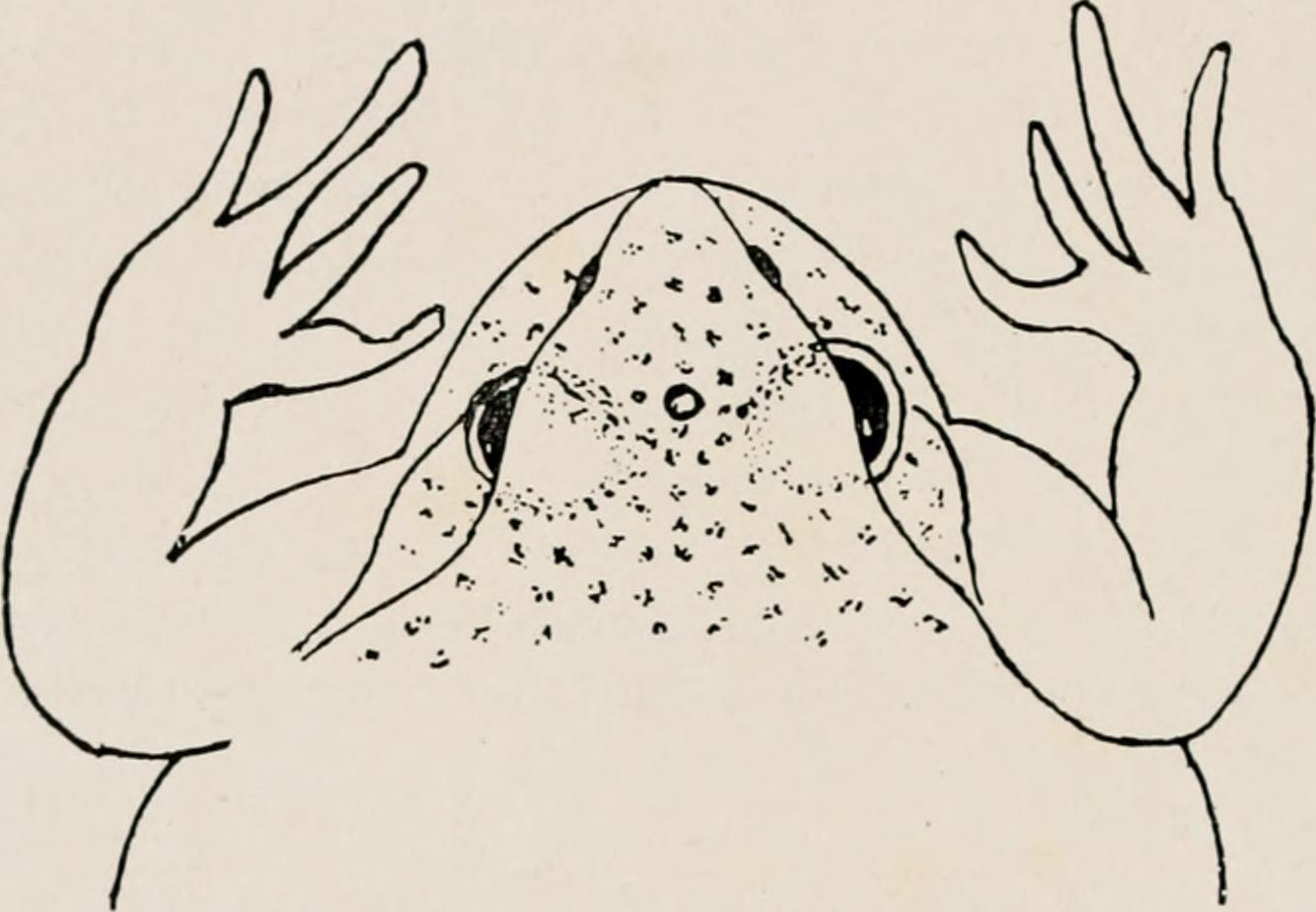
The third eye (frontal organ) of a frog, seen between the regular eyes.

Eakin was known for his research of animal eyes and photoreceptor cells, especially the parietal eye (the so-called "third eye") and associated pineal gland of vertebrates. He was persuaded to study the parietal eyes of reptiles by his colleague Robert C. Stebbins, and the two published several articles on the parietal eye of western fence lizards. Eakin, alone or with colleagues, published many other papers on the anatomy and function of reptilian parietal eyes and similar structures in amphibians. Eakin's 1973 monograph, The Third Eye, was received as comprehensive and detailed enough for biologists, yet in a style approachable to non-scientists or undergraduates. He also studied amphibian development and was recognized as a skilled and early practitioner of electron microscopy. Eakin received a Guggenheim Fellowship in 1953, and the Boston Museum of Science's Walker Prize in 1976. He authored or co-authored over 200 scientific papers, was elected president of the Western Society of Naturalists in 1949 and American Society of Zoologists in 1975, and was a fellow of the California Academy of Sciences for 52 years.

=== "Great scientists speak again" ===
In 1970, in order to combat boredom and absenteeism in his introductory zoology course, Eakin gave his first lecture in character, appearing unannounced in full costume and makeup as William Harvey, the 17th-century physician who made the first complete descriptions of blood circulation. His portrayals of historic scientists, including Charles Darwin, Louis Pasteur, and Gregor Mendel, often involved elaborate wigs, makeup, costumes, and props, aided by professional makeup artists and drama teachers- his portrayal of Darwin required up to three hours of makeup, wig, and beard preparation. His lectures were popular with students from the start and attracted international attention, with profiles in publications such as LIFE, Der Spiegel, and the International Herald Tribune. He gave guest lectures at universities nationwide, and in 1975 compiled the text of his lectures, along with photographs, diagrams, and stage directions, into a book, Great Scientists Speak Again. Eakin typically gave six lectures in character during a course, with each "guest lecturer" introducing particular concepts. The figures portrayed, in order of appearance during a typical course, were:

- William Harvey (1578–1657)
- William Beaumont (1785–1853)
- Hans Spemann (1869–1941)
- Gregor Mendel (1822–1884)
- Louis Pasteur (1822–1895)
- Charles Darwin (1809–1882)

Eakin considered his impersonation of Spemann to be his most authoritative, due to knowing him personally from working in his lab in Germany, helping translate a book of his into English, and becoming good friends.

Eakin was recognized for his teaching long before he first donned a wig: in 1963 he was the first recipient of Berkeley's Senior Citation for Distinguished Teaching and in 1968 received the Outstanding Teaching Award from the Associated Students of the University of California.

== Later years (1977–1999) ==
Eakin retired in 1977 and was honored with the Berkeley Citation, the highest honor given to Berkeley faculty. He continued to periodically perform his lectures in character until 1988, and also taught embryology at several historically black colleges and universities in the southern U.S., including Tougaloo College, Mississippi; Talladega College and Tuskegee University, Alabama; and Fisk University in Tennessee.

Eakin was a member of the First Congregational Church of Berkeley for over 60 years, where his first wife, Mary Mulford Eakin – ordained by the United Church of Christ – was associate minister. He co-authored a history of the church in 1999. In a 1981 interview, Eakin stressed that matters of faith and science should be kept separate – as he did in his own life as both a Christian and a scientist – and that proponents of teaching creationism alongside evolution in public schools should similarly recognize the differences. "The great concepts of justice, mercy and love- science cannot test them or write a formula", he said, "They are human beliefs and are outside the realm of science."

His first wife Mary, with whom he had three children (one of whom died prior to 1956), died in 1980. He later remarried Barbara Nichols, a former professor at the University of California, San Francisco.

Eakin died on November 25, 1999, at his home in Danville, California, at the age of 89. He was survived by his wife Barbara, a son and daughter from his first marriage, and two stepdaughters.

== Books ==
- Vertebrate Embryology: A Laboratory Manual. University of California Press. 1973.
- The Third Eye. University of California Press. 1973.
- Great Scientists Speak Again. University of California Press. 1975.
- The Future is Watching: A History of the First 125 Years of First Congregational Church of Berkeley. First Congregational Church of Berkeley. 1999. ISBN 978-0-9675305-0-5. (with James M. Spitze)
