= Rancho La Zaca =

Land grant in California

Coordinates: 34.750°N 120.130°W

Rancho La Zaca was a 4,458-acre (18.04 km^{2}) Mexican land grant in present-day central Santa Barbara County, California given in 1838 by Governor Juan B. Alvarado to an indigenous man named Antonio. The grant was located along Zaca Creek, north of Rancho Corral de Cuati and surrounded by Rancho La Laguna, east of the Santa Ynez Valley.

== History ==
Cesario Lataillade acquired Rancho La Zaca. Cesario Armand Lataillade (1819–1849) was a French trader involved in the hide and tallow trade who came to Santa Barbara in 1841. He married Antonia María de la Guerra (1827–), the fourth and youngest daughter of José de la Guerra y Noriega, in 1845. Lataillade was granted Rancho Cuyama (No. 2), and acquired Rancho Cuyama (No. 1) and Rancho Corral de Cuati. Lataillade was killed in an accident in 1849, and the properties inherited by his widow and their two children, Maria Antonia Lataillade (1846–1916) and Cesario Eugene Lataillade (1849–).

With the cession of California to the United States following the Mexican-American War, the 1848 Treaty of Guadalupe Hidalgo provided that the land grants would be honored. As required by the Land Act of 1851, a claim for Rancho La Zaca was filed with the Public Land Commission in 1852, and the grant was patented to María Antonia de la Guerra y Lataillade in 1876.

== See also ==
- Ranchos of California
- List of Ranchos of California
