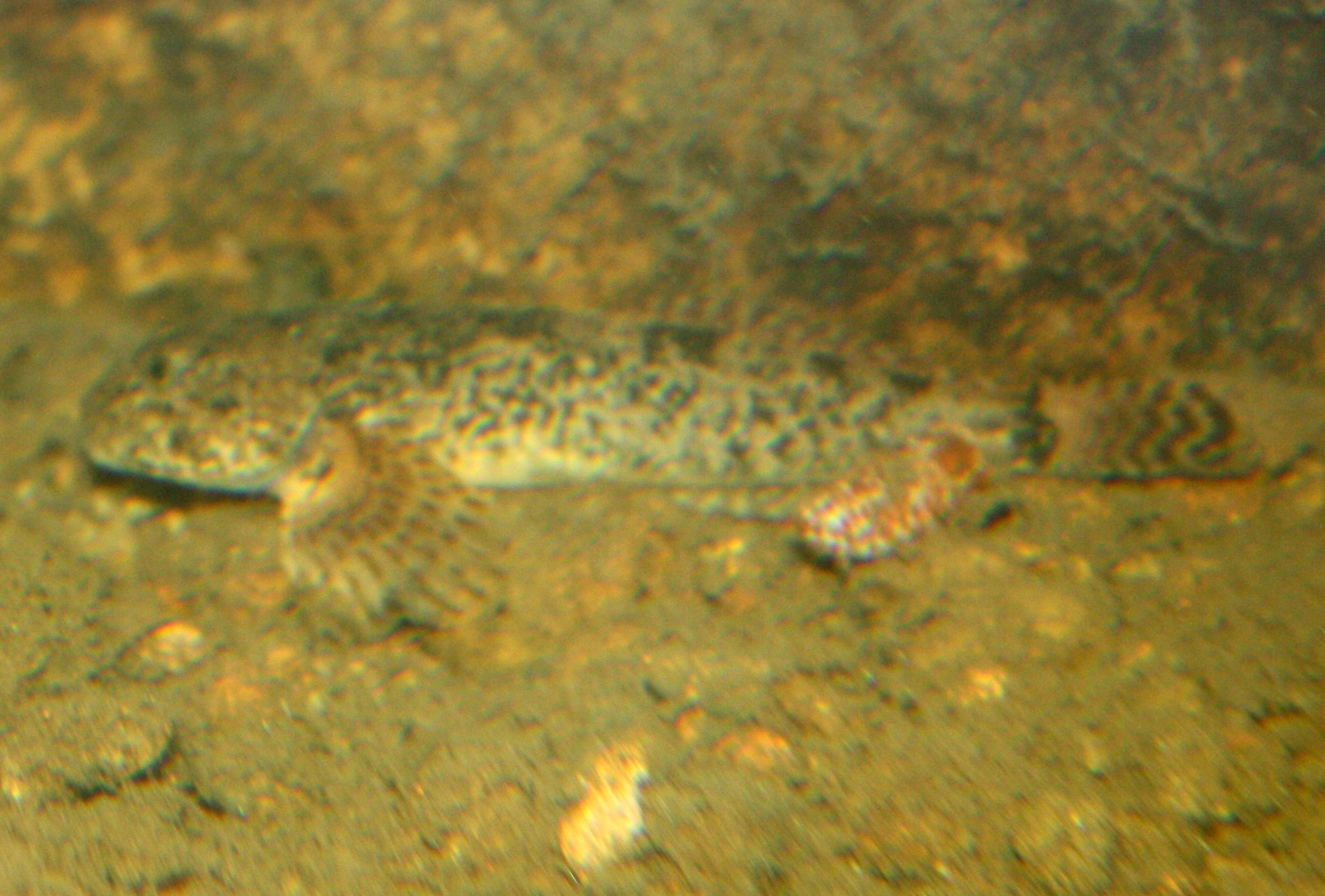

Conservation status
- Least Concern (IUCN 3.1)

Scientific classification
- Kingdom: Animalia
- Phylum: Chordata
- Class: Actinopterygii
- Order: Perciformes
- Suborder: Cottoidei
- Family: Cottidae
- Genus: Cottus
- Species: C. beldingii

Binomial name
- Cottus beldingii C. H. Eigenmann and R. S. Eigenmann, 1891

= Paiute sculpin =

Species of fish

The Paiute sculpin (Cottus beldingii) is a species of fish in the family Cottidae. It is found in the United States, inhabiting the Columbia River drainage from Idaho, western Wyoming, and northeastern Nevada to western Washington and Oregon, and endorheic basins including Lake Tahoe in Nevada and California. It reaches a maximum length of 13.0 cm. It prefers rubble and gravel riffles of cold creeks and small to medium rivers. It is also found in rocky shores of lakes. Paiute sculpin are benthic organisms, residing at the bottom of their environments.

== Description ==
Paiute sculpin are small and can grow up to 13 cm, although their growth is slow. They are mottled brown and black in color on their upper sides and are pale below. They have a dot on the caudal peduncle near their second dorsal fin either colored yellow or white. Their fins (pectoral, pelvic, dorsal, anal, and caudal) can be mottled too. They have 4–5 vertical bands on their sides. Their coloring provides good camouflage in the stream environments. They have smooth skin without scales. Their body does not have any spines unlike the closely related prickly sculpin. Their caudal fin is rounded, and their dorsal fin is separated with their pelvic fins extending past their vent. Their pectoral fins have been described as fan-like and contain 14–15 rays within the fins. The posterior dorsal fin is rayed, containing 13–16 rays and the anterior dorsal fin is spined, containing 6–8 spines. The rays differ from the spines because they are less bony and more flexible than the bigger and more structured spines. Paiute sculpin also have two pre-opercular spines on the sides of its head in front of the gill cover, or operculum to distinguish them. The upper spine is long and slender while the second spine is more inconspicuous and less obvious. Male Paiute sculpin have long papillae that set them apart from the females. The males' mouth width is greater than the distance between the pelvic and anus while females have a wider distance between the anus and pelvic fin than the width of the mouth. Their lateral line is incomplete and contains 23–35 pores. They also have two median chin pores.

== Distribution ==
The Paiute sculpin is found in Western United States in the Lahontan system, the Columbia River drainage which includes Lake Tahoe. They are reportedly in the states: Idaho, Wyoming, Nevada, Washington, Oregon, California, and Utah. They live in the cold waters of streams and creeks typically in riffles of clear water systems, making them often associated with trout as well. They are usually found in deep water of the creeks near aquatic macrophytes. They can be found in substrate types including: silt, under logs, gravel, boulders, and aquatic vegetation and are known to prefer course substrates like gravel. It has been found that these fish will have preference to parts of streams that have less in-stream structures. They are quite abundant and showed a clear dominance over other sculpin species in the Lapwai Creek watershed. They were also found to be very abundant in the Lahontan system in Nevada and California, specifically the upper cold reaches of the lakes and streams in the basin, where there are no other species of freshwater sculpin found. The sculpin has also been found in the Little Wood River in Idaho and the Sagehen Creek in the Eastern Sierra Nevada in which they dominate the middle and bottom reach of the creak but are being pushed by the invasive species, signal crayfish.

== Biology ==
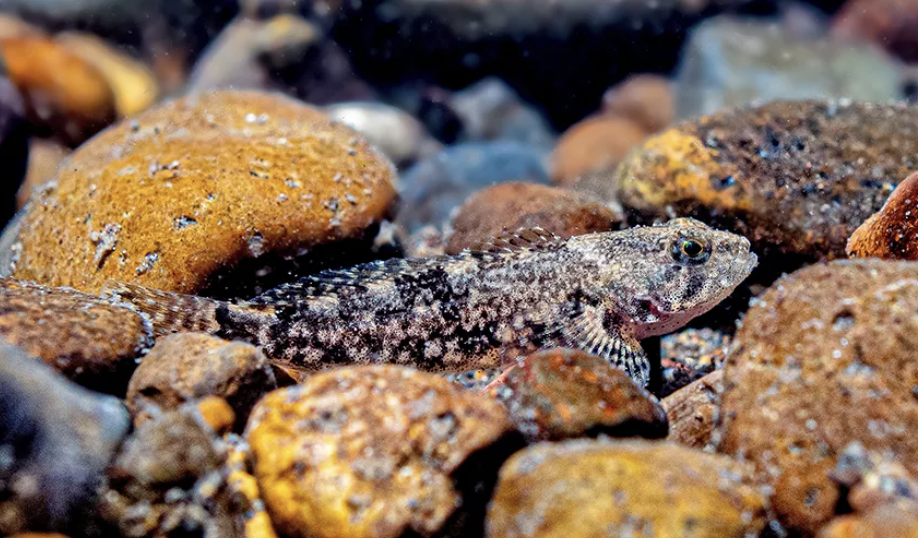
Paiute Sculpin amongst rocks on the bottom of stream.via Oregon State University: Oregon Sea Grant

Paiute Sculpin are benthic-dwelling fish and remain strictly at the bottom of the cold waters they are found in. They hide under rocks and plants in the day and come out at night time to feed. These fish reach sexual maturity in their second and third year and will spawn in primarily May and June and live up to five years. The females lay their eggs in sites with rocky or gravelly substrate to hide their nests. Their nests will have around 120 eggs per clutch, as it was observed in Lake Tahoe. Once the fish are hatched, the fry hatch will remain in the nest for about two weeks to absorb their yolk sacs. After those two weeks the young fish leave the nest and enter the current at night to be taken downstream. In-stream structures and pollutants can potentially alter the species' distribution because they are sensitive to habitat alterations like other sculpin. They are found with many other fish species including: brook trout, cutthroat trout, and mottled sculpin and are referenced as a sister species to the Wood River sculpin.

== Diet ==
The Paiute Sculpin are benthic organisms and therefore their diet is mainly benthic consisting of a lot of aquatic insect larvae. They also will eat aquatic beetles, snails, water mites, algae, and detritus. Bottom-dwelling Paiute sculpin will feed on mostly detritus and algae while it was found more shallow-water sculpin will eat more of the benthic species like chironomid larvae. They will feed primarily at night as it is easier to ambush and capture their prey when they have limited visibility. It has also been observed that their feeding varies with seasonality.

== Conservation ==
The Paiute sculpin is not currently listed but is found in freshwater systems in California and Nevada co-occurring with Lahontan cutthroat trout, cui-ui, and bull trout all of which are listed IUCN species. Their movement has been known to be restricted by anthropogenic disturbance, effecting the long-term population viability for those in that area. In the Sagehen Creek watershed they have been met with some difficulty from the invasive signal crayfish. The crayfish are encroaching on the sculpin habitat and have been found to be affecting growth rates and gut fullness.
