= Rancho Corral de Cuati =

Land grant in California

Coordinates: 34.700°N 120.150°W

Rancho Corral de Cuati (also known as Rancho Corral de Quati) was a 13,322-acre (53.91 km^{2}) Mexican land grant in present-day Santa Barbara County, California given in 1845 by Governor Pío Pico to Agustín Dávila. The grant was located along Alamo Pintado Creek, north of present-day Los Olivos. The grant is surrounded by Rancho La Laguna.

== History ==
Agustín Dávila (1805–1848) was a painter who came to California in 1834 with the Híjar-Padrés Colony. Dávila painted the facade, nave walls, and the ceiling above the sanctuary of the Mission Santa Clara de Asís. He married María de Jesús Félix (1823 –) in 1836. He was granted the three square league Rancho Corral de Cuati in 1845. In a confrontation at Rancho Tinaquaic in 1848, Dávila was killed by Benjamin Foxen.

Cesario Lataillade acquired Rancho Corral de Cuati. Cesario Armand Lataillade (1819–1849) was a French trader involved in the hide and tallow trade who came to Santa Barbara in 1841. He married Antonia María de la Guerra (1827–), the fourth and youngest daughter of José de la Guerra y Noriega, in 1845. Lataillade was granted Rancho Cuyama (No. 2), and acquired Rancho Cuyama (No. 1) and Rancho La Zaca . Lataillade was killed in an accident in 1849, and the properties inherited by his widow and their two children, Maria Antonia Lataillade (1846–1916) and Cesario Eugene Lataillade (1849–).

With the cession of California to the United States following the Mexican-American War, the 1848 Treaty of Guadalupe Hidalgo provided that the land grants would be honored. As required by the Land Act of 1851, a claim for Rancho Corral de Cuati was filed with the Public Land Commission in 1852, and the grant was patented to María Antonia de la Guerra y Lataillade in 1876.

== See also ==
- Ranchos of California
- List of Ranchos of California
