= Mimetridium =

Scientific classification
- Domain: Eukaryota
- Kingdom: Animalia
- Phylum: Cnidaria
- Subphylum: Anthozoa
- Class: Hexacorallia
- Order: Actiniaria
- Family: Acontiophoridae
- Genus: Mimetridium; Hand, 1961
- Species: M. cryptum

Binomial name
- Mimetridium cryptum Hand, 1961

Genus of sea anemones

Mimetridium is a genus of sea anemones of the family Acontiophoridae. It currently includes only one species Mimetridium cryptum.

== Taxonomy ==
Both the genus and the species were first described by Cadet Hand, the former director of the Bodega Marine Laboratory, in 1961. The holotype specimen is held at the Otago Museum.

== Description ==
Dr Elizabeth J. Batham described this species as:

a slender, elongated species with many fine tentacles. Apart from its longer column, it superficially resembles the northern hemisphere Metridium senile, to which it was earlier regarded as being closely related.

== Distribution ==
This species was described from New Zealand and has been recorded off the coasts of Dunedin and Wellington.

== Habitat ==
M. cryptum is normally attached to a shell or rock in mud or sand and prefers to be half buried. However, this species is known to both burrow into the sand as well as walk.
