= Central Sierra Field Research Stations =

Research stations in California

The Central Sierra Field Research Stations—CSFRS is a regional group of University of California, Berkeley field research & education reserves located on both sides of the crest of the Sierra Nevada range, north of Lake Tahoe in California.

Several of the University of California Natural Reserve System—UCNRS reserves in the Central Sierra Field Research Stations—CSFRS lie within the headwaters of the North Fork of the American River.

== History ==
On September 26, 2006, a consortium of land owners & managers including: the North Fork Association, Chickering Partnership, United States Forest Service Tahoe National Forest, Pacific Southwest Research Station of the U.S. Forest Service, and the Regents of the University of California signed a Conservation and Research Agreement addressing future cooperative management of the approximately 19,670 acres (79.6 km^{2}) of public & private lands in this watershed.

== Field research stations & education reserves ==
Central Sierra Field Research Stations—CSFRS entities include:

- Sagehen Creek Field Station
- Central Sierra Snow Laboratory
- Onion Creek Experimental Watershed
- North Fork Association Lands
- Chickering American River Reserve

Sagehen Creek Field Station serves as the hub of this network, offering accessible accommodations, classrooms, support and resources — which are unavailable at the other, sometimes remote CSFRS reserves.

Digital elevation models & other GIS datasets for the CSFRS are available.

== Contacts ==
For information regarding research & education access to the CSFRS reserves, publications, theses, and additional data — please contact the individual Reserve Managers through their web-sites (when available), or contact the Station Manager at Sagehen Creek Field Station.
