= University of California Natural Reserve System =

Network of nature reserves in California

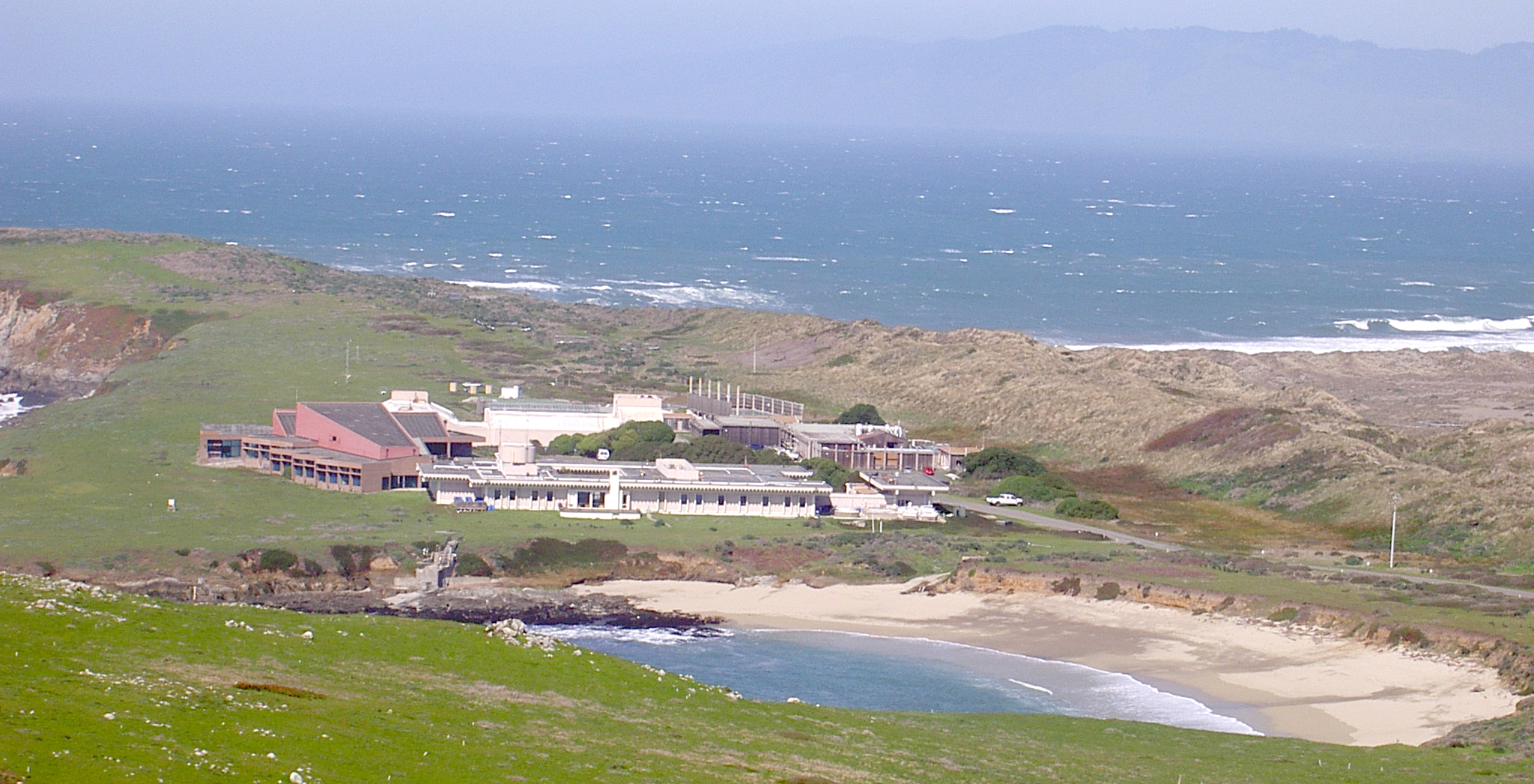
Bodega Marine Lab, Bodega Marine Reserve

The University of California Natural Reserve System (UCNRS) is a system of protected areas throughout California. The reserves support UC's mission of teaching, research, and public service. Unlike national and state parks, they are not available for recreational uses, because they were specifically created to enable UC scientists to conduct research free from such distractions.

The system began with UC Berkeley zoology professor Joseph Grinnell. In 1937, near the end of his career, Grinnell began to work on a proposal to establish UC's first wildland field station for zoology teaching and research. He had initially looked to the U.S. national parks for research sites, but became frustrated with the National Park Service and how its other priorities often got in the way of his priorities. Grinnell became convinced that only a natural reserve owned by the university itself "would provide the permanent protection necessary for long-term teaching, research, and monitoring of California's ecosystems."

Grinnell did not live long enough to see his proposal succeed. In May 1939, two weeks after Grinnell's sudden death from a heart attack, the Regents of the University of California voted to accept his proposal and created the oldest reserve in the system, Hastings Natural History Reservation.

On January 22, 1965, at the suggestion of Kenneth S. Norris, the UC Board of Regents voted to formally join Hastings and six other reserves into the Natural Land and Water Reserves System. In 1970, it was renamed the Natural Reserve System. In 2026, the organization was renamed UC Nature.

== List of reserves ==
Reserve	Campus	Area (ha)	Area (Acre)	Coordinates	Web	Notes
Angelo Coast Range Reserve	Berkeley	1,755	4,336	39°43′45″N 123°38′40″W		On the South Fork of the Eel River. Protected by The Nature Conservancy (TNC).
Año Nuevo Island Reserve	Santa Cruz	10	25	37°6′30″N 122°20′10″W		UC manages site within the larger Año Nuevo State Reserve, owned and operated by California State Parks.
Blue Oak Ranch Reserve	Berkeley	1,319	3,259	37°22′53″N 121°44′14″W		In the Diablo Range, northwest of Mount Hamilton.
Bodega Marine Reserve	Davis	146	362	38°18′25″N 123°3′54″W		On Bodega Bay.
Box Springs Reserve	Riverside	65	160	33°59′31″N 117°17′43″W		Adjacent to UC Riverside.
Philip L. Boyd Deep Canyon Desert Research Center	Riverside	2,477	6,122	33°35′N 116°20′W		In the Santa Rosa Mountains, near Palm Desert.
Burns Piñon Ridge Reserve	Irvine	129	320	34°8′20″N 116°27′10″W		In the Mojave Desert, near Joshua Tree National Park.
Carpinteria Salt Marsh Reserve	Santa Barbara	49	120	34°24′N 119°31′W		In Carpinteria.
Chickering American River Reserve	Berkeley	6,829	16,875	39°14′48″N 120°19′31″W		In the headwaters basin of the North Fork of the American River, Sierra Nevada.
Coal Oil Point Natural Reserve	Santa Barbara	68	170	34°25′N 119°52′W		Adjacent to the Santa Barbara campus. Coal Oil Point seep field is offshore.
Dawson Los Monos Canyon Reserve	San Diego	95	234	33°8′30″N 117°15′20″W		Within the town of Vista.
Elliott Chaparral Reserve	San Diego	74	183	32°52′6″N 117°8′33″W		At former Camp Kearny, on the Kearny Mesa.
Emerson Oaks Reserve	Riverside	98	241	33°28′N 117°2′W		In the Temecula Valley, southern Riverside County. Protected by TNC.
Fort Ord Natural Reserve	Santa Cruz	245	605	36°40′N 121°46′W		At the former Fort Ord, near Monterey Bay.
Hastings Natural History Reservation	Berkeley	960	2,373	36°12′30″N 121°33′30″W		In the Santa Lucia Mountains, upper Carmel Valley.
James San Jacinto Mountains Reserve	Riverside	77	190	33°48′30″N 116°46′40″W		In the San Jacinto Mountains. Satellite site Oasis de los Osos (west end of the Coachella Valley) protected by TNC.
Hans Jenny Pygmy Forest Reserve	Berkeley	28	70	39°17′N 123°45′W		Above the coast in Mendocino County. Protected by TNC.
Jepson Prairie Reserve	Davis	634	1,566	38°16′N 121°49′W		In the Central Valley. Protected by TNC and the Solano Land Trust.
Kendall-Frost Mission Bay Marsh Reserve	San Diego	8	21	32°47′N 117°13′W		On Mission Bay.
Kenneth S. Norris Rancho Marino Reserve	Santa Barbara	202	500	35°31′41″N 121°4′35″W		Coast near Cambria.
Landels-Hill Big Creek Reserve	Santa Cruz	1,584	3,911	36°4′N 121°35′W		In the Santa Lucia Mountains, along the Big Sur coast. TNC involved in the protection of this site.
Lassen Field Station	Davis	N/A	N/A	40°20′48″N 121°36′29″W		An agreement with the National Park Service makes Lassen Volcanic National Park available to users.
McLaughlin Natural Reserve	Davis	2,800	7,050	38°52′N 122°24′W		Within the Blue Ridge Berryessa Natural Area.
Merced Vernal Pools and Grassland Reserve	Merced	2,656	6,561	37.3753°N 120.413°W		Next to the UC Merced campus
Motte Rimrock Reserve	Riverside	289	715	33°48′45″N 117°15′30″W		In western Perris Valley, Peninsular Ranges.
Point Reyes Field Station	Berkeley	N/A	N/A	37°59′48″N 122°42′12″W		Within Point Reyes National Seashore.
Quail Ridge Reserve	Davis	1,011	2,500	38°28′59″N 122°8′58″W		Near the Blue Ridge Berryessa Natural Area. QuRiNet deployed here.
Sagehen Creek Field Station	Berkeley	3,642	9,000	39°25′57″N 120°14′13″W		In the northern Sierra Nevada, near Truckee and north of Lake Tahoe. Operated by the University of California under a long-term special-use permit from the U.S. Forest Service.
San Joaquin Marsh Reserve	Irvine	82	202	33°39′30″N 117°51′30″W		Upper Newport Bay.
Santa Cruz Island Reserve	Santa Barbara	18,624	46,020	34°0′N 119°44′W		Santa Cruz Island. Protected, owned, and managed by TNC.
Scripps Coastal Reserve	San Diego	342	844	32°52′30″N 117°15′15″W		Adjacent to the UC San Diego Scripps Institution of Oceanography.
Sedgwick Reserve	Santa Barbara	2,358	5,896	34°42′N 120°1′W		In the Santa Ynez Valley and the foothills of the San Rafael Mountains.
Sierra Nevada Aquatic Research Laboratory	Santa Barbara	22.6	56	37°36′50″N 118°49′56″W		South of the town of Mammoth Lakes and southwest of the Mammoth Yosemite Airport. Land is leased from the Los Angeles Department of Water and Power.
Stebbins Cold Canyon Reserve	Davis	233	583	38°30′32″N 122°5′50″W		Within the Blue Ridge Berryessa Natural Area.
Steele/Burnand Anza-Borrego Desert Research Center	Irvine	35.6	88	33°24′N 116°39′W		An agreement with Anza-Borrego Desert State Park and the Anza-Borrego Foundation makes the park, which is managed by California State Parks, available to field station users.
Strathearn Ranch Reserve	Santa Cruz	1,093	2,700	36°50′2″N 121°9′48″W		Near Hollister.
Stunt Ranch Santa Monica Mountains Reserve	Los Angeles	126	310	34°6′N 118°39′W		In Los Angeles County, within the Santa Monica Mountains National Recreation Area.
Sweeney Granite Mountains Desert Research Center	Riverside	3,600	9,000	34°48′20″N 115°39′50″W		In the Granite Mountains, within the Mojave National Preserve.
Valentine Camp	Santa Barbara	62	154	37°37′47″N 118°59′44″W		Within the town of Mammoth Lakes.
White Mountain Research Center	Los Angeles	18	45	37°21′41″N 118°19′36″W		Five research facilities ranging from the Owens Valley to the highest point of the White-Inyo Mountains east of the town of Bishop.
Yosemite Field Station	Merced	N/A	N/A	37°32′23″N 119°39′29″W		An agreement with the National Park Service makes Yosemite National Park, Sierra Nevada available to users.
Younger Lagoon Reserve	Santa Cruz	10	26	36°57′3″N 122°3′57″W		The northwest edge of Monterey Bay on the west side of the city of Santa Cruz.
