= New Cuyama Airport =

Airport in California

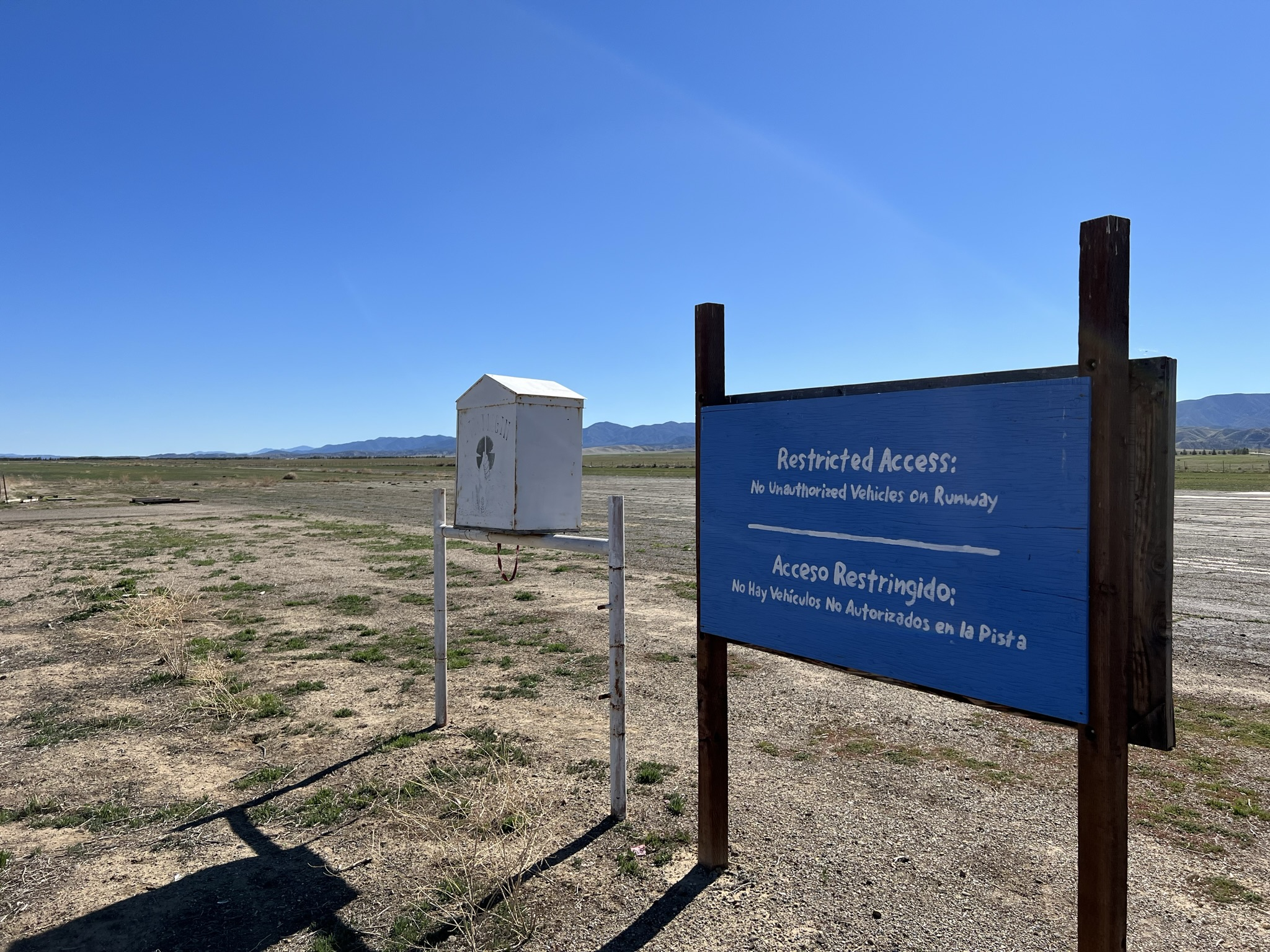
- Main airport runway
- IATA: none; ICAO: none; FAA LID: L88

Summary
- Airport type: Public use
- Owner: Blue Sky Center
- Serves: New Cuyama, California
- Elevation AMSL: 2,203 ft / 671 m
- Coordinates: 34°56′24″N 119°41′08″W

Map
- Location in California

Runways
Direction	Length		Surface
Direction	ft	m	Surface
11/29	3,380	1,030	Asphalt

Statistics (2011)
- Aircraft operations: 500
- Source: Federal Aviation Administration

New Cuyama Airport (FAA LID: L88) is a privately owned, public use airport located in New Cuyama, in Santa Barbara County, California, United States.

== Facilities and aircraft ==
New Cuyama Airport covers an area of 308 acres (125 ha) at an elevation of 2,204 feet (672 m) above mean sea level. It has one runway designated 11/29 with an asphalt surface measuring 3,380 by 60 feet (1,090 x 18 m).

For the 8-month period ending December 31st, 2023, the airport had 829 general aviation aircraft operations, an average of 104 per month.

== General condition ==
October 2023. One pilot reports that "the runway is repaved and in good condition, however the parking area is a little rough.". Airport was recently renovated and has reopened as of October 8, 2022.
