= Walnut, California =

City in California, United States

- City
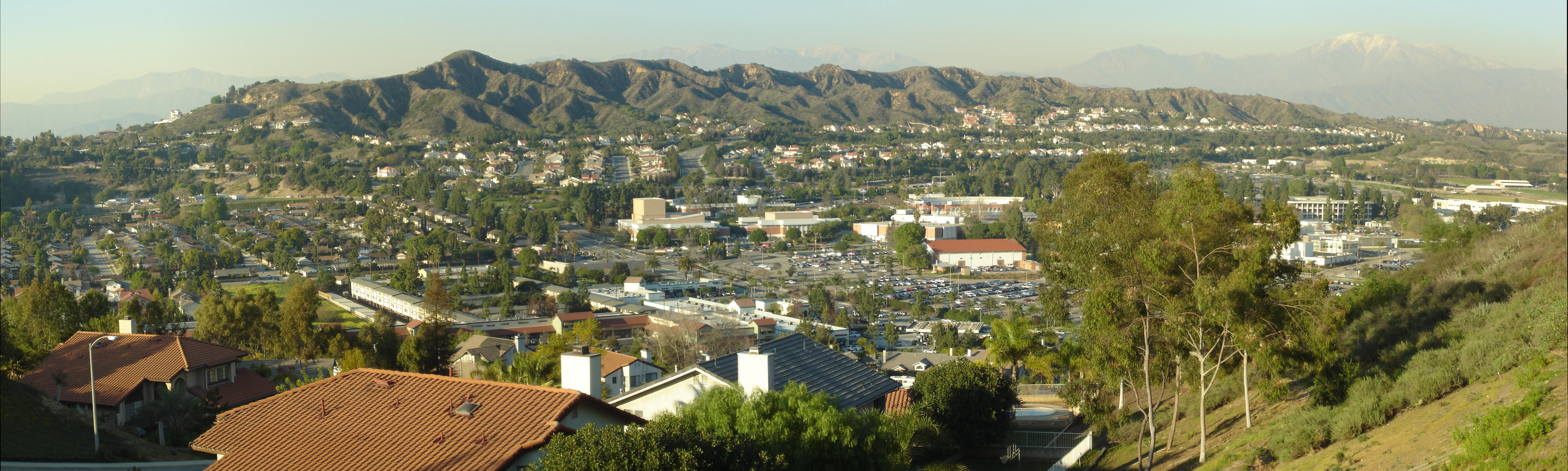
- View of Mt. San Antonio College and surrounding area
- Interactive map of Walnut, California
- Location in the United States
- Coordinates: 34°2′N 117°52′W
- Country: United States
- State: California
- County: Los Angeles
- Incorporated (city): January 19, 1959
- Named for: Rancho Los Nogales (lit. 'Ranch of the Walnut Trees')

Government
  - Type: Council-Manager
  - Mayor: Ritchie Cajulis
  - Mayor Pro Tem: Allen Wu
  - Council Member: Linda Freedman
  - Council Member: Kaylee May Law
  - Council Member: Nancy Tragarz
  - City Manager: Tom Weiner

Area
  - Total: 8.99 sq mi (23.29 km^{2})
  - Land: 8.99 sq mi (23.28 km^{2})
  - Water: 0.0039 sq mi (0.01 km^{2}) 0.04%
- Elevation: 561 ft (171 m)

Population (2020)
  - Total: 28,430
  - Density: 3,163/sq mi (1,221.1/km^{2})
- Time zone: UTC-8 (PST)
  - Summer (DST): UTC-7 (PDT)
- ZIP Codes: 91788, 91789, 91795
- Area codes: 909, 626
- FIPS code: 06-83332
- GNIS feature IDs: 1652808, 2412173
- Website: www.walnutca.gov

Walnut is a city in the San Gabriel Valley of eastern Los Angeles County in the U.S. state of California. According to the 2020 census, the city had a population of 28,430.

The greater Walnut Valley is located between the steep San Jose Hills to the north and the gently sloping Puente Hills to the south. Quality housing consists of master-planned single family homes ranging in size from 1,800 to 11,200 sq ft (170 to 1,040 m^{2}). The city hosts a highly ranked public school system: the Walnut Valley Unified School District, which has been ranked by numerous sources as one of the top public school districts in Southern California, as well as Mt. San Antonio College.

The city covers nearly 9 sq mi (23 km^{2}) and is home to hundreds of businesses. According to the 2023 census bureau estimate, Walnut has a median household income at one of the top-earning percentiles in the country at $133,762.

The city's name is derived from the Rancho Los Nogales Mexican land grant, nogales being the Spanish word for "walnut trees"; the native California black walnut is a common tree, native to the San Jose Hills. The City of Walnut is a general law city incorporated on January 19, 1959. It is governed by a city council/city manager form of government. A five-member city council is elected by the residents, and a mayor is elected annually by the council to serve a twelve-month term. A city manager is appointed by the council to oversee the daily activities of the city.

== Geography ==
Walnut is located on the southern slopes of the San Jose Hills, with West Covina to the northwest, Covina to the north, San Dimas to the northeast, Pomona to the east, Diamond Bar, Rowland Heights, and the City of Industry to the south, and La Puente to the west. Several small creeks (i.e. Snow Creek, Lemon Creek) run mostly to the south toward the valley of San Jose Creek, which runs west to the San Gabriel River.

=== Climate ===
Climate data for Walnut, California
Month	Jan	Feb	Mar	Apr	May	Jun	Jul	Aug	Sep	Oct	Nov	Dec	Year
Record high °F (°C)	91 (33)	94 (34)	100 (38)	104 (40)	106 (41)	117 (47)	113 (45)	109 (43)	113 (45)	107 (42)	97 (36)	93 (34)	117 (47)
Mean daily maximum °F (°C)	68 (20)	69 (21)	71 (22)	76 (24)	79 (26)	84 (29)	90 (32)	92 (33)	89 (32)	80 (27)	74 (23)	68 (20)	78 (26)
Mean daily minimum °F (°C)	43 (6)	45 (7)	47 (8)	49 (9)	54 (12)	58 (14)	62 (17)	62 (17)	60 (16)	55 (13)	47 (8)	42 (6)	52 (11)
Record low °F (°C)	21 (−6)	22 (−6)	27 (−3)	29 (−2)	31 (−1)	38 (3)	37 (3)	43 (6)	38 (3)	29 (−2)	25 (−4)	22 (−6)	21 (−6)
Average precipitation inches (mm)	3.11 (79)	4.76 (121)	2.63 (67)	1.20 (30)	0.23 (5.8)	0.09 (2.3)	0.00 (0.00)	0.03 (0.76)	0.15 (3.8)	1.05 (27)	1.62 (41)	2.45 (62)	17.32 (440)

== History ==
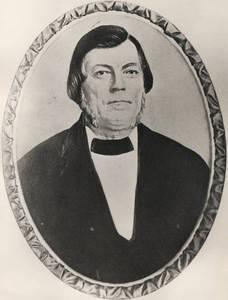
Californio ranchero Ricardo Vejar owned both Rancho Los Nogales and part of Rancho San José, which make up modern-day Walnut.

The area are the traditional lands of the Tongva people. Spanish missionaries who arrived in the 18th century called the indigenes Gabrieleño, because the area where they lived was controlled by the San Gabriel Mission. The Walnut area was part of the network of outlying ranches used for the grazing of cattle and sheep by the Mission.

Following secularization of the missions in the 1830s, former mission lands were divided into ranchos, and given away as land grants by the Mexican government of Alta California. In the Walnut area, the first grants were Rancho San Jose (granted to Ricardo Vejar and Ygnacio Palomares in 1837); Rancho Los Nogales (granted to Jose De La Cruz Linares in 1840); and Rancho La Puente (granted to John Rowland and William Workman in 1842). In 1868, John Rowland and William Workman divided Rancho La Puente, leaving Rowland the eastern half and Workman the western half. Rowland's land included the western portion of Walnut and the adjacent community now called Rowland Heights. The land was used mainly for raising cattle and growing wheat, grapes, and fruit trees (mostly citrus).

In 1895, the first U.S. post office was established and given the name "Lemon". In 1908, the post office name was changed to Walnut. As a reminder of those early days, the U.S. Post Office is on Lemon Avenue, one of the town's main streets.

== Demographics ==
Historical population
Census	Pop.	Note	%±
1960	934		—
1970	5,992		541.5%
1980	12,478		108.2%
1990	29,105		133.3%
2000	30,004		3.1%
2010	29,172		−2.8%
2020	28,430		−2.5%
U.S. Decennial Census; 1860–1870 1880–1890; 1900 1910 1920; 1930 1940 1950; 1960 1970 1980; 1990 2000 2010; 2020

Walnut first appeared as a city in the 1960 U.S. census as part of the East San Gabriel Valley census county division.

=== Racial and ethnic composition ===
Walnut city, California – Racial and ethnic composition Note: the US Census treats Hispanic/Latino as an ethnic category. This table excludes Latinos from the racial categories and assigns them to a separate category. Hispanics/Latinos may be of any race.
Race / Ethnicity (NH = Non-Hispanic)	Pop 1980	Pop 1990	Pop 2000	Pop 2010	Pop 2020	% 1980	% 1990	% 2000	% 2010	% 2020
White alone (NH)	8,016	9,475	5,463	3,645	2,589	64.24%	32.55%	18.21%	12.49%	9.11%
Black or African American alone (NH)	498	1,855	1,237	786	676	3.99%	6.37%	4.12%	2.69%	2.38%
Native American or Alaska Native alone (NH)	65	61	23	29	10	0.52%	0.21%	0.08%	0.10%	0.04%
Asian alone (NH)	1,294	10,572	16,665	18,445	19,063	10.37%	36.32%	55.54%	63.23%	67.05%
Native Hawaiian or Pacific Islander alone (NH)	1,294	10,572	22	28	17	10.37%	36.32%	0.07%	0.10%	0.06%
Other race alone (NH)	12	36	72	44	112	0.10%	0.12%	0.24%	0.15%	0.39%
Mixed race or Multiracial (NH)	x	x	719	620	639	x	x	2.40%	2.13%	2.25%
Hispanic or Latino (any race)	2,593	6,836	5,803	5,575	5,324	20.78%	23.49%	19.34%	19.11%	18.73%
Total	12,478	29,105	30,004	29,172	28,430	100.00%	100.00%	100.00%	100.00%	100.00%

=== 2020 census ===
As of the 2020 census, Walnut had a population of 28,430 and a population density of 3,162.8 inhabitants per square mile (1,221.2/km^{2}).

The census reported that 100.0% of residents lived in urban areas and 0.0% lived in rural areas. The census also reported that 99.98% of the population lived in households, 0.02% lived in non-institutionalized group quarters, and no one was institutionalized.

There were 8,861 households, of which 33.0% had children under the age of 18 living in them. Of all households, 66.8% were married-couple households, 20.1% had a female householder with no spouse or partner present, 10.5% had a male householder with no spouse or partner present, and 2.6% were cohabiting couple households. About 10.1% of households were made up of one person, and 5.6% had someone living alone who was aged 65 or older. The average household size was 3.21, and there were 7,651 families (86.3% of all households).

The age distribution was 17.1% under the age of 18, 9.5% aged 18 to 24, 21.6% aged 25 to 44, 29.6% aged 45 to 64, and 22.2% who were 65 years of age or older. The median age was 46.5 years. For every 100 females, there were 94.7 males, and for every 100 females age 18 and over, there were 92.5 males.

There were 9,169 housing units at an average density of 1,020.0 units per square mile (393.8 units/km^{2}), of which 8,861 were occupied. Of occupied units, 83.0% were owner-occupied and 17.0% were occupied by renters. The vacancy rate was 3.4%; the homeowner vacancy rate was 0.8%, and the rental vacancy rate was 3.7%.

=== Income and poverty ===
In 2023, the US Census Bureau estimated that the median household income was $133,762, and the per capita income was $51,555. About 7.1% of families and 8.6% of the population were below the poverty line.

=== 2010 census ===
According to the 2010 United States census, Walnut had a median household income of $101,250, with 6.2% of the population living below the federal poverty line.

The 2010 United States census reported that Walnut had a population of 29,172. The population density was 3,242.8 inhabitants per square mile (1,252.1/km^{2}). The racial makeup of Walnut was 18,567 (63.6%) Asian, 6,913 (23.7%) White (12.5% Non-Hispanic White), 824 (2.8%) African American, 69 (0.2%) Native American, 28 (0.1%) Pacific Islander, 1,750 (6.0%) from other races, and 1,021 (3.5%) from two or more races. Hispanic or Latino of any race were 5,575 persons (19.1%).

The Census reported that 29,138 people (99.9% of the population) lived in households, 22 (0.1%) lived in non-institutionalized group quarters, and 12 (0%) were institutionalized.

There were 8,533 households, out of which 3,492 (40.9%) had children under the age of 18 living in them, 6,298 (73.8%) were opposite-sex married couples living together, 985 (11.5%) had a female householder with no husband present, 394 (4.6%) had a male householder with no wife present. There were 163 (1.9%) unmarried opposite-sex partnerships, and 26 (0.3%) same-sex married couples or partnerships. 627 households (7.3%) were made up of individuals, and 237 (2.8%) had someone living alone who was 65 years of age or older. The average household size was 3.41. There were 7,677 families (90.0% of all households); the average family size was 3.55.

The population was spread out, with 6,088 people (20.9%) under the age of 18, 3,092 people (10.6%) aged 18 to 24, 6,089 people (20.9%) aged 25 to 44, 10,339 people (35.4%) aged 45 to 64, and 3,564 people (12.2%) who were 65 years of age or older. The median age was 43.1 years. For every 100 females, there were 96.2 males. For every 100 females age 18 and over, there were 93.6 males.

There were 8,753 housing units at an average density of 973.0 per square mile (375.7/km^{2}), of which 7,536 (88.3%) were owner-occupied, and 997 (11.7%) were occupied by renters. The homeowner vacancy rate was 0.8%; the rental vacancy rate was 4.4%. 25,504 people (87.4% of the population) lived in owner-occupied housing units and 3,634 people (12.5%) lived in rental housing units.

=== Mapping L.A. ===
Mapping L.A. reported that Chinese (21.0%) and Mexican (14.6%) were the most common ancestries in the 2000 census. Taiwan (20.7%) and Philippines (17.3%) were the most common foreign places of birth in 2000.

== Economy ==
Shea Homes, and the United States divisions of the Filipino home video company Viva Video, Inc. and the Japanese card game company Bushiroad are based in Walnut.

According to the 2010 United States census, Walnut had a median household income of $101,250, with 6.2% of the population living below the federal poverty line.

According to the city's 2017 Comprehensive Annual Financial Report, the principal employers in the city are:

Principal Employers in Walnut, CA
Rank	Employer	# of employees	% of total employment
1	Mount San Antonio College	3,775	49%
2	Ninas Mexican Food, Inc.	140	2%
3	Ronsin Photocopy Inc.	124	2%
4	Recruiter Exchange Inc	108	1%
5	Edro Engineering Company, Inc.	84	1%
6	Stater Brothers Market	81	1%
7	Sodexo, Inc.	76	1%
8	Vons #2167	73	1%
9	Applebee's Neighborhood Grill	67	1%
10	TJ Maxx #682	66	1%

== Sports ==
=== Mt. SAC Relays ===
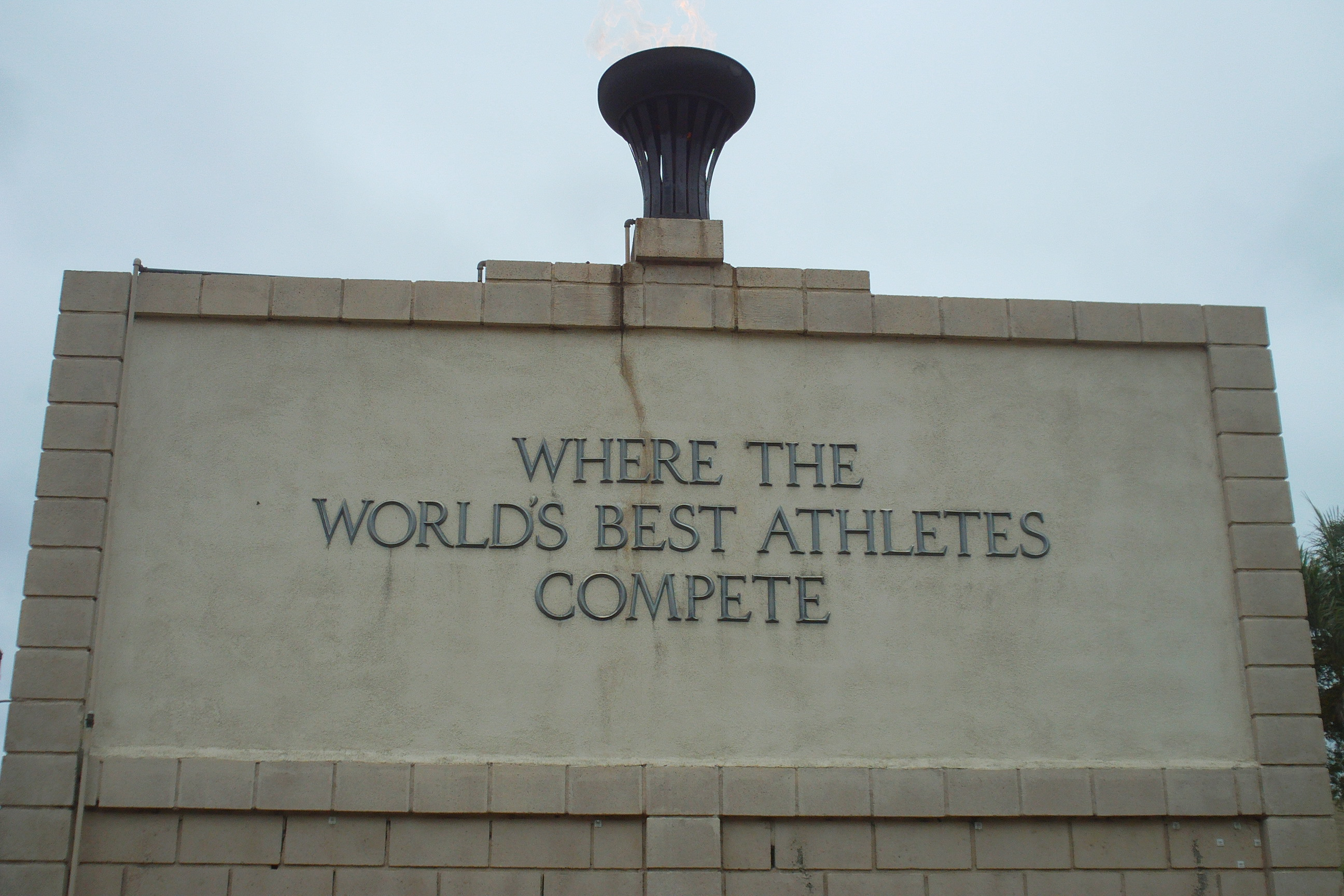
Olympic Flame and wall of honor at Hilmer Lodge Stadium

Started in 1959, the Mt. SAC Relays are an annual track and field festival held primarily at Hilmer Lodge Stadium on the Mt. San Antonio College campus. The April festival attracts many elite athletes from around the world to the city of Walnut. This meet and other elite track meets held at the stadium, including the 1968 Olympic Trials and two editions of the USA Outdoor Track and Field Championships have emblazoned the identification of "Walnut, California" in numerous national records in athletics around the world. At various points in time, many world records were set at the Mt. SAC Relays.

The October Mt. SAC Cross Country Invitational, run in the hills surrounding the stadium, proclaims itself to be the largest Cross Country meeting in the world. Much of the same course is used as the annual CIF Southern Section championships and the western qualifier for the Foot Locker Cross Country Championships.

=== Proposed NFL stadium ===
In April 2008, billionaire land developer and co-owner of the Los Angeles Lakers and Kings Edward P. Roski unveiled plans for the construction of an $800 million NFL stadium in the neighboring City of Industry. In March 2009, Walnut filed a lawsuit opposing construction of the stadium, but dropped those charges in September.

On October 23, 2009, California governor Arnold Schwarzenegger signed a bill allowing the 75,000-seat stadium to be built in neighboring Industry in hopes of attracting an NFL team there. This bill would also nullify a lawsuit filed by local residents over the project's environmental impact report.

== Government ==
=== Municipal ===
The five-member Walnut City Council is the elected legislative body governing the City. The City Manager, Tom Weiner, runs the day-to-day operations of the agency, and has served in this role since 2022. Alex Merkel Medina is the City Treasurer and Director of Finance.

=== State and federal ===
In the California State Legislature, Walnut is in the 30th senatorial district, represented by Democrat Bob Archuleta, and in the 56th Assembly district, represented by Democrat Lisa Calderon.

In the United States House of Representatives, Walnut is in California's 38th congressional district, represented by Democrat Linda Sánchez.

While the Congressional, State Senate, and State Assembly districts that Walnut is located in may have tendencies to vote for Republican candidates, since the 2000 election Walnut has voted only for Democratic presidential, gubernatorial, and senatorial candidates, with the exceptions of 2003 and 2006 when they voted for Arnold Schwarzenegger. Walnut voters break down by party affiliation 63.102% Democratic and 35.598% Republican.

Election results from statewide races
Year	Office	Results
2022	Governor	Newsom 55.5–44.5%
2022	Senator	Padilla 56.7–43.3%
2021	Recall	No 62.0–38.0%
2020	President	Biden 61.5–37.0%
2018	Governor	Newsom 58.3–41.7%
2018	Senator	Feinstein 60.0–40.0%
2016	President	Clinton 62.0–33.1%
2016	Senator	Harris 60.8–39.2%
2014	Governor	Brown 57.3–42.7%
2012	President	Obama 57.8–40.1%
2012	Senator	Feinstein 61.9–38.1%
2010	Governor	Brown 48.8–46.5%
2010	Senator	Boxer 48.4–46.8%
2008	President	Obama 56.2–42.0%
2006	Governor	Schwarzenegger 60.3–36.1%
2006	Senator	Feinstein 58.6–37.5%
2004	President	Kerry 51.1–48.0%
2004	Senator	Boxer 57.6–38.2%
2003	Recall	Yes 64.0–36.0%
2003	Recall	Schwarzenegger 60.1–24.2%
2002	Governor	Davis 47.5–45.9%
2000	President	Gore 53.4–43.6%
2000	Senator	Feinstein 55.1–38.1%
1998	Governor	Davis 47.5–45.9%
1998	Senator	Fong 51.2–45.7%
1996	President	Clinton 50.0–40.1%
1994	Governor	Wilson 57.6–38.9%
1994	Senator	Huffington 50.4–40.8%

== Education ==
Primary education in Walnut is generally served by the prestigious Walnut Valley Unified School District (WVUSD), which has been ranked by numerous sources to be one of the top public school districts in all of Southern California; it also serves parts of the city of Diamond Bar. Schools located in and around Walnut include:

- C.J. Morris Elementary School
- Collegewood Elementary School
- Oswalt Academy (Formerly known as Oswalt Elementary School) (Rowland Unified School District)
- Vejar Elementary School
- Walnut Elementary School
- Westhoff Elementary School
- Suzanne Middle School
- Southlands Christian Schools
- South Pointe Middle School
- Chaparral Middle School
- Ronald Hockwalt Academies (Formerly known as Del Paso High School)
- Walnut High School
- Diamond Bar High School

Portions of the western side of Walnut are also served by the Rowland Unified School District.

In addition, Mt. San Antonio College, one of the California Community Colleges, is also located in Walnut near its border with Pomona.

== Infrastructure ==
The Los Angeles County Sheriff's Department (LASD) operates the Walnut/Diamond Bar Station in Walnut.

The Los Angeles County Department of Health Services operates the Pomona Health Center in Pomona, serving Walnut.

Los Angeles County Fire Department Station 61 is located in the City of Walnut.

== Surrounding suburban cities ==
- Diamond Bar (which shares the same school district with Walnut)
- City of Industry
- Pomona
- La Puente
- West Covina

== Notable people ==
- David Ji (born 1952), Chinese-American electronics entrepreneur who co-founded Apex Digital.
- Aja Naomi King, actress, How to Get Away with Murder
- Kyle MacKinnon, ice hockey center who played for the San Diego Gulls
- Darius McCrary, actor, singer, and producer; known most for playing Eddie Winslow on the television show Family Matters
- Lance Parrish, MLB baseball catcher
