= Rancho Los Nogales =

Mexican land grant in California

Coordinates: 34.050°N 117.810°W

Rancho Los Nogales was a 1,004-acre (4.06 km^{2}) Mexican land grant in present-day Los Angeles County, California, given in 1840 by Governor Juan Alvarado to Jose de la Luz Linares. The name means "Ranch of the Walnut Trees" in Spanish. The triangular-shaped land grant between San Jose Creek and Diamond Bar Creek included parts of present-day Walnut and Diamond Bar.

== History ==
Jose Ynes de la Luz Linares (20 Jan 1800 - 2 Sep 1846) a Mexican soldier in the garrison of the San Diego Presidio from 1825, received the grant in 1840. After Linares died, his widow, Maria de Jesus Bruno Garcia (1800 - ), sold a part of the ranch to Ricardo Véjar in 1847. Véjar acquired the rest of Rancho Nogales over the next 10 years. Véjar also owned part of Rancho San Jose to the north.

With the cession of California to the United States following the Mexican-American War, the 1848 Treaty of Guadalupe Hidalgo provided that the land grants would be honored. As required by the Land Act of 1851, a claim for Rancho Los Nogales was filed with the Public Land Commission by María de Jesús Garcia, et al in 1852, and the grant was patented to María de Jesús Garcia in 1882.

Contrary to multiple false representations made by US apologists, Véjar's interests in the Rancho Los Nogales were stolen by the US government and then sold to others. The original grant was for over 1,000 acres however the official "survey" showed it as less than 500. Véjar also lost his interests in the Rancho San Jose to foreclosure after two grossly corrupt "merchants" from New York took advantage of Véjar's inability to read English and his belief that what they told him the documents he was asked to sign actually meant. In 1918, Frederich E. Lewis bought up most of the original Rancho Los Nogales.

== See also ==
- Ranchos of California
- List of Ranchos of California
- Ranchos of Los Angeles County
