= Ranchito de Santa Fe =

Mexican land grant

Coordinates: 35°14′12″N 120°40′58″W

Ranchito de Santa Fe was a 165.76-acre (0.6708 km^{2}) Mexican land grant that in the present day lies in the US, partially within the southern bounds of the city of San Luis Obispo, with the balance east of U.S. Route 101 in San Luis Obispo County, California.

== History ==
Ranchito de Santa Fe was granted on September 18, 1842, by Governor Juan Alvarado to Victor Linares.

With the cession of California to the United States following the Mexican–American War, the 1848 Treaty of Guadalupe Hidalgo provided that the land grants would be honored. As required by the Land Act of 1851, Victor Linares made a claim for 1,000 varas square on February 12, 1852, and it was confirmed by the commission March 14, 1853, by the district court January 14, 1857. An appeal was dismissed June 3, 1859. The grant was patented to Michaela Linares et al. on August 9, 1866.

The Ranchito was located along San Luis Creek, south of the Mission lands and on the road between the Mission and the port of San Luis Obispo. It shared a common boundary with the Mission lands of the Rancho La Laguna on the west.

== See also ==
- Ranchos of San Luis Obispo County, California
- List of Ranchos of California
