= Burns Piñon Ridge Reserve =

Nature reserve

- Location within California Location within the United States
- Location: San Bernardino County, California
- Coordinates: 34°08′57″N 116°27′15″W
- Area: 303 acres (0.473 mi^{2})
- Established: 1972
- Governing body: University of California, Irvine
- Website: http://burns.ucnrs.org/

The Burns Piñon Ridge Reserve is a 303-acre (123 ha) nature reserve that is part of the University of California Natural Reserve System. It is located near Yucca Valley, California in San Bernardino County, California. Administered by UC Irvine, the reserve is owned by the University of California and managed for teaching and research.

Reserve lands form a transition zone, or ecotone, between the high-elevation ecosystems of the San Bernardino Mountains and the lower, hotter Mojave Desert.

== History ==
From 1947 to 1972, the reserve was owned by Bruce and Jean Burns. The couple built a home and raised a family there before selling much of the property to the university. The Burns house now serves as a field station that provides accommodations for reserve visitors. The university purchased the remainder of the Burns land in 1990.

== Geology ==
The most salient feature of the reserve are its weathered boulder hills. Because the reserve lies in the rain shadow of the San Bernardino Mountains, millions of years of drying eroded the soils. Wind blew away much of the soil, exposing the granitic bedrock below. Additional spalling produced the characteristic look of the reserve's boulder piles.

== Ecology ==
Habitats at the reserve include desert, a freshwater seep, and a wash. Vegetation typical of the high elevation Mojave, such as Joshua trees (Yucca brevifolia), nolina (Nolina parryi), and the reserve's namesake, the piñon pine (Pinus monophylla) grow atop the dry hills.

The wash supports lower-elevation desert plants such as desert willow (Chilopsis linearis subsp. arcuata), mesquite (Prosopis glandulosa var. torreyana) and catclaw (Senegalia greggii).

Perennially moist lower Railroad Wash sustains Muller's oak (Quercus cornelius-mulleri) and rushes (Juncus sp.)

Two species of quail mingle on the reserve, mountain (Oreortyx pictus) and Gambel's (Callipepla gambelii) "NRS: Burns Piñon Ridge Reserve". UC Irvine Natural Reserve System. UC Irvine.. Other common fauna include horned lizards, coachwhip snakes, and phainopepla. Two new beetle species discovered in the wash were described in 2011.
