= Víctor Pantaleón Linares =

California of San Luis Obispo (1807–1853)

Víctor Pantaleón Linares (1807–1853), Californio, soldier, ranchero, majordomo of Mission San Luis Obispo, vecino and Juez of San Luis Obispo. Grandson of some of the earliest Spanish settlers of California, his second son Pio Linares was an infamous leader, (allegedly with Jack Powers), of a bandit gang in San Luis Obispo County in the 1850s.

== Víctor Pantaleón Linares' family and early life ==
Víctor Pantaleón Linares was a descendant of his grandfather Ygnacio Antonio Linares, a Spanish soldier from Sonora with a wife and four children who came to Alta California with the second Anza Expedition in 1776. He served as a soldier in the Presidio of San Francisco and died in San Jose in 1805.

Víctor Linares' father, Salvador Linares, son of Ygnacio Antonio Linares, was born on December 25, 1775, as the second Anza Expedition was crossing the desert from Sonora to Mission San Gabriel. He followed his father as a soldier in the Monterey Presidio, marrying a widow with a daughter, Maria Bernarda Alvarez. Together they had four sons, three of whom reached adulthood. Salvador died at the Monterey Presidio in August 1807, at age 31, soon after the birth of his twin sons Francisco and Víctor on July 24, 1807; both were christened the next day at Mission Nuestra Senora de la Soledad.

Salvador's widow, with a daughter from her first marriage and the three young sons from the second, married for a third time on December 17, 1809, at Mission San Gabriel, to Jose Pedro Villalobos, a corporal of the garrison of San Diego Presidio. It was he or perhaps his father Juan Jose Miguel Villalobos, an old soldier and resident of San Diego, who raised the sons of Salvador Linares until his death March 7, 1825. That year the eldest Linares son, Jose Ynes de la Luz joined the garrison of San Diego Presidio and was later granted the Rancho Los Nogales in 1840. He was followed the next year by one of the younger twin sons, Víctor Linares. The other twin son of Salvador, Francisco "Santiago" Linares, did not join the military but followed a path that led to his execution for a robbery and murder at Los Angeles on April 7, 1841. He was buried in the La Iglesia de Nuestra Señora la Reina de los Ángeles Cemetery.

At the San Diego Presidio, Víctor was married to a widow, Maria Micaela Villa, with two sons, 5-year-old Sebastian Villa and 2-year-old Francisco, on January 8, 1826. That April, while serving as a sentry, Víctor Linares killed Juan German, a vecino of San Diego. Linares was court-martialed, but was acquitted because he had merely performed his duty as a sentry.

Within a year of the court martial Víctor Linares had left San Diego and was living near Mission San Gabriel, where his first son Pedro was born on July 30, 1827, and christened the following day. Víctor had become a vecino of Los Angeles by 1831, when his second son, Pio, was born May 4 and the following day was christened in La Iglesia de Nuestra Señora la Reina de los Ángeles in the town plaza. A census taken in Los Angeles in 1836 showed Víctor living with his wife Micaela, his two stepsons, 16-year-old Sebastian Villa and 12-year-old Francisco Villa, and his sons, 9-year-old Pedro, 5-year-old Pio, and 1-year-old Fernando age.

== Ranchero ==
The following year in 1837 Víctor Linares was granted the two leagues of Rancho Tinaquaic in what is now in Santa Barbara County, California. There three more of his children, two daughters Maria and Augustias and a son Raymundo were born, between 1838 and 1841. Located far from a church there are no surviving records known of birth or christening for these children, only later census data for their approximate age. In 1839, Víctor Linares was appointed majordomo of the lands of the Mission San Luis Obispo de Tolosa from May to October when he was let go to save the $20 salary and cost of his large family.

However, in on April 22, 1840, Víctor Linares as an alférez in the Monterey company of auxiliaries, was ordered by Governor Juan B. Alvarado to take charge of a Sergeant and 11 men, under the command of Captain J. M. Covarrubias to be an escort of Prefect Castro during his mission to take 60 foreign prisoners including Isaac Graham, to Mexico City. They were accused with of plotting the overthrow of the government of Alta California. However his detachment was later replaced by a larger number of men under more experienced leaders.

About 1842, Rancho Tinaquaic came into the hands of William D. Foxen, son in law of the grantee of the rancho adjacent to Tinaquaic and later the claimant for Tinaquaic before the Land Commission in 1852. The date of the disceno in the Rancho Tinaquaic Land Case dates from 1842, the probable year Foxen acquired the grant of Rancho Tinaquaic from Víctor Linares. That was the same year, Linares was granted the 5 leagues of Rancho Cañada de los Osos in San Luis Obispo County, perhaps an exchange was made so Linares could have a rancho near his home in San Luis Obispo that he had also acquired.

In 1842 Víctor Linares was granted Ranchito de Santa Fe, a 1,000 vara square lot (165.76 acres) within the Pueblo lands of San Luis Obispo by Gov. Juan B. Alvarado. It was later confirmed to his widow in 1857.

Víctor Linares was also granted the Rancho Cañada de los Osos on December 1, 1842, by Governor Juan B. Alvarado. The rancho lay west of San Luis Obispo to Morro Bay in the Los Osos Valley, between the Irish Hills to the south and the Nine Sisters to the north.

== Vecino and Juez of San Luis Obispo ==
In 1844, Víctor Linares sold his Rancho Cañada de los Osos to James Scott and John Wilson who also bought the adjacent Rancho Pecho y Islay a strip of Pacific coastal terrace and the Irish Hills bordering the terrace from Pecho Creek to the east and Islay Creek to the north. Scott and Willson added it to their Los Osos rancho and combined them in a new 32,431 acre grant, Rancho Cañada de los Osos y Pecho y Islay from Governor Pio Pico in 1845.

In January 1846 Víctor Linares was appointed Juez of the Second Instance for San Luis Obispo. On March 7, Linares ordered Padre Jose Nicolas Gomez, curate of the Mission San Luis, to turn over Mission property to Juez Jesus Pico for James Scott and John Wilson its purchasers. Padre Gomez appealed to the bishop, who asked the Governor to reserve certain storerooms and the mills of the Mission. The Governor promised to investigate. March 10, Padre Gomez wrote to the Governor, complaining of lack of means of support, also of his mortifications and insults. March 29, possession given to Jesus Pico. April 18, Linares, Juez 2nd was reprimanded by the subprefect for insubordination.

The 1850 California census showed Víctor Linares living in his home in the town, with his wife, sons Pedro 23, Pio 18, and Fernando 16, and daughters Maria Antonia, 14, Augustias, 12, Maria Olivia, 5, and Teresa, 3. The 1852 California census showed Víctor Linares living in his home in the town, with his wife and younger children, [Fernando, 18, Raymundo, 9, Maria Olivia, 7. Pedro and Pio had been married and moved out. Pedro had been married to Maria Antonia Figueroa, on August 16, 1846, but only had his first child in May 1851. On May 17, 1851, Pio had married, Maria Antonia Ortega, the widow of Trifon Garcia, grantee of Rancho Atascadero, who had three children. He subsequently moved out to a ranchita on the north side of town.

Víctor Linares, having died of a fever, strangely, had two death records, one dated June 1852 and another dated June 1853, Linares was recorded as being buried at Mission San Luis Obispo de Tolosa, on June 6, 1852, and June 6, 1853. The widow of Víctor testified that he died on or about June 5, 1853.
