= Rancho Marino Reserve =

Part of the University of California Natural Reserve System

Kenneth S. Norris Rancho Marino Reserve
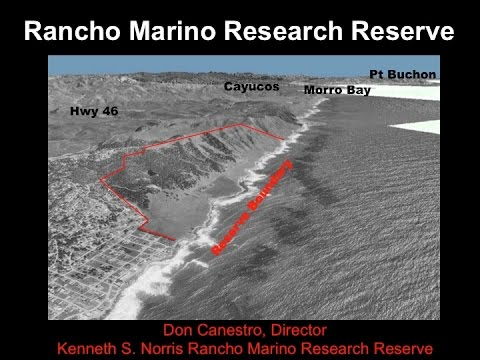
- Norris Rancho Marino Reserve location map
- Location: Cambria, San Luis Obispo County, California
- Coordinates: 35°31′41″N 121°4′35″W
- Area: 500 acres (0.78 mi^{2})
- Governing body: University of California, Santa Barbara
- Website: ranchomarino.ucnrs.org

Kenneth S. Norris Rancho Marino Reserve is part of the University of California Natural Reserve System. The reserve is located along the coast of San Luis Obispo County at the south end of the town of Cambria, California. It is named for Kenneth S. Norris, a University of California professor, renowned naturalist, and founder of the UC Natural Reserve System. It is operated by the university under a use agreement, as it is privately owned and funded. There is no public access.

== History ==
Native Californians obtained shellfish along the shore, fished, and gathered acorns and other plants here for food as far back as 5,000 years ago. Reserve lands were part of the land grant of Rancho Santa Rosa that were given to Julian Estrada by the governor of Mexico in 1841. Swiss dairymen grazed cattle on what are now reserve lands, and Chinese seaweed farmers lived here from 1900 to 1960, burning intertidal rocks in winter to encourage new sea lettuce (Ulva sp.) growth. The site joined the UC Natural Reserve System in 2001.

== Geography ==
Reserve lands lie between the Cambria and offshore San Gregorio-Hosgri faults within the San Andreas Fault Zone. An uplifted marine terrace known as the Cambria Slab drops into the ocean at a sea cliff, while the eastern edge of the reserve rises steeply to 700 feet (0.21 km)in elevation. Nine coastal drainage systems flow from the ridge into the ocean on reserve property, dropping sediments onto alluvial fans. Two are dammed to provide drinking water for cattle as well as habitat for fish and frogs. Two are designated blue line streams by the Army Corps of Engineers.

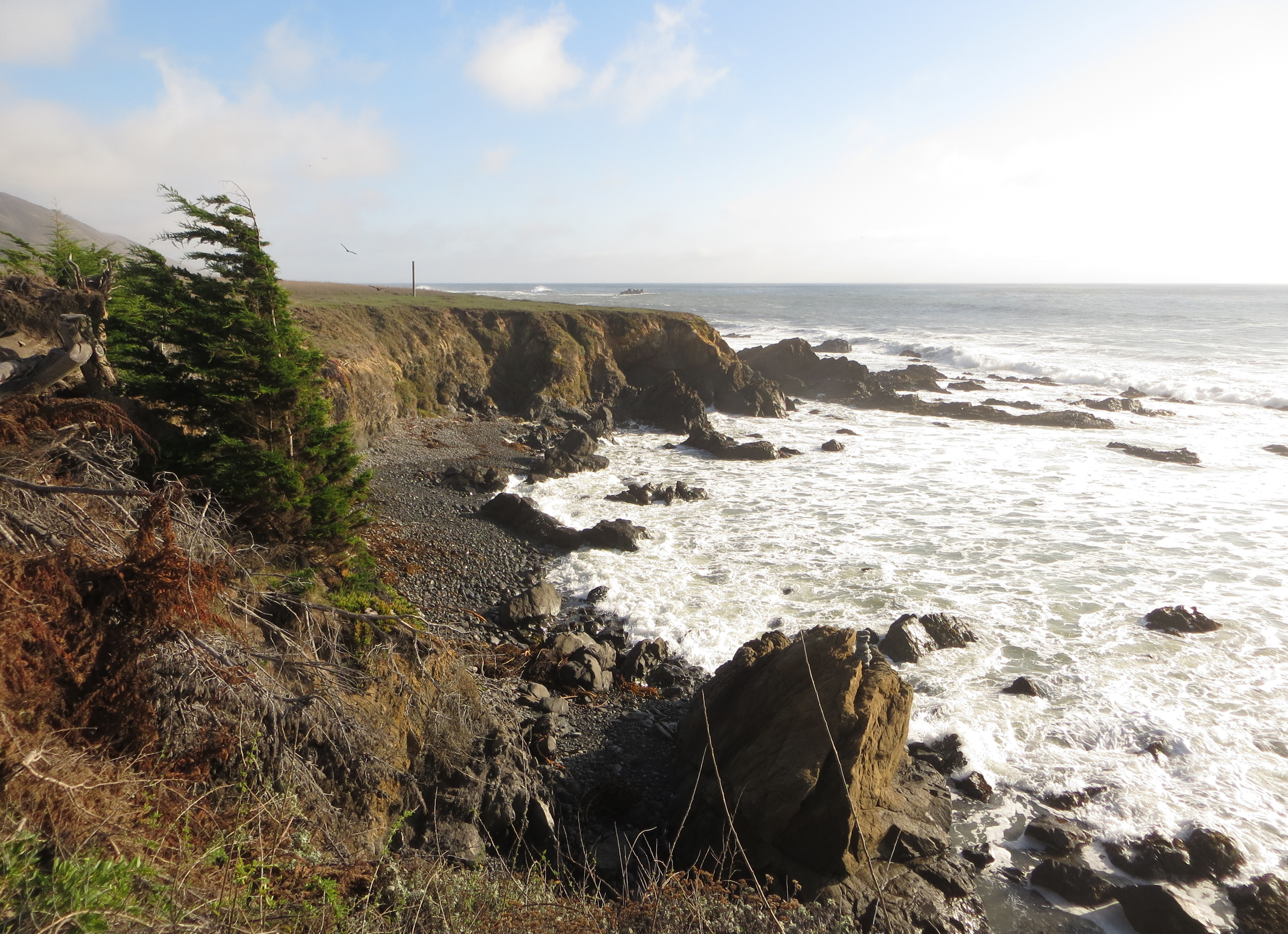
Rancho Marino Reserve shoreline

== Habitats ==
The reserve has 225 acres (0.91 km^{2}) of Monterey pine forest, at the southern end of one of the state's three remaining original stands. Adjacent to reserve lands lies White Rock (Cambria) State Marine Conservation Area. Kelp beds support southern sea otters as well as a wealth of fishes and rocky intertidal species. Coastal terrace prairies and coastal scrub habitats are also found on the reserve. The reserve has an active cattle grazing program.

== Science ==
The Partnership for Interdisciplinary Studies of Coastal Oceans (PISCO) monitors the health of the kelp forests, rocky shoreline habitats, and coastal current ecosystems of the reserve. The Multi-Agency Rocky Intertidal Network (MARINe) has intertidal sites here, and a Western Regional Climate Center weather station is also located on the reserve. A long term study of the demography of Monterey pines was started in 2001. Southern sea otter studies are ongoing.
