= New Cuyama, California =

New Cuyama
- Census-designated place
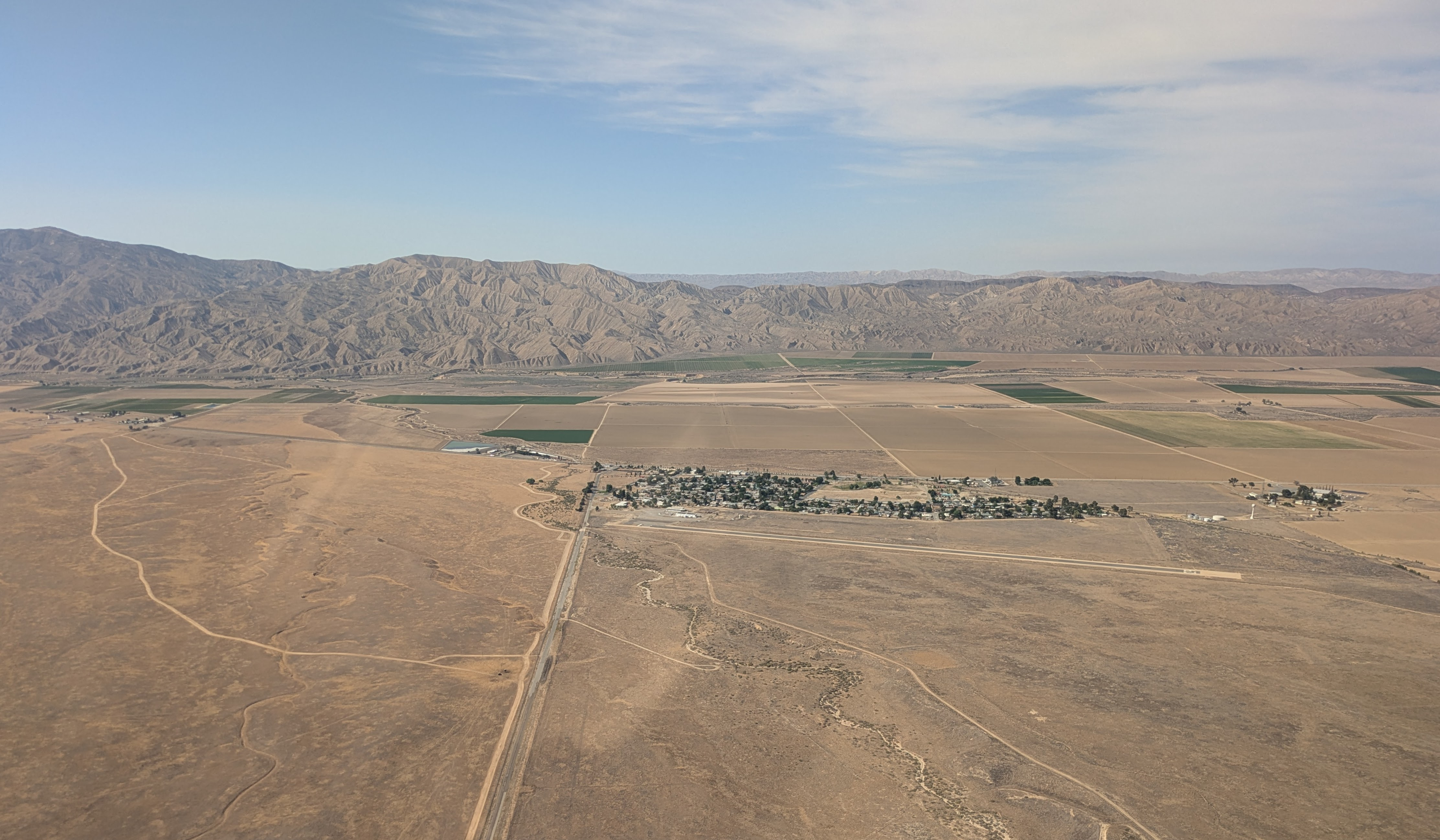
- New Cuyama in an aerial photo looking north, taken in 2025

- Position in California
- Coordinates: 34°56′53″N 119°41′21″W
- Country: United States
- State: California
- County: Santa Barbara
- Settled: 1822

Area
  - Total: 0.632 sq mi (1.638 km^{2})
  - Land: 0.632 sq mi (1.638 km^{2})
  - Water: 0 sq mi (0 km^{2}) 0%
- Elevation: 2,150 ft (660 m)

Population (2020)
  - Total: 542
  - Density: 857/sq mi (331/km^{2})
- Time zone: UTC-8 (PST)
  - Summer (DST): UTC-7 (PDT)
- ZIP code: 93254
- Area code: 661
- Website: www.countyofsb.org

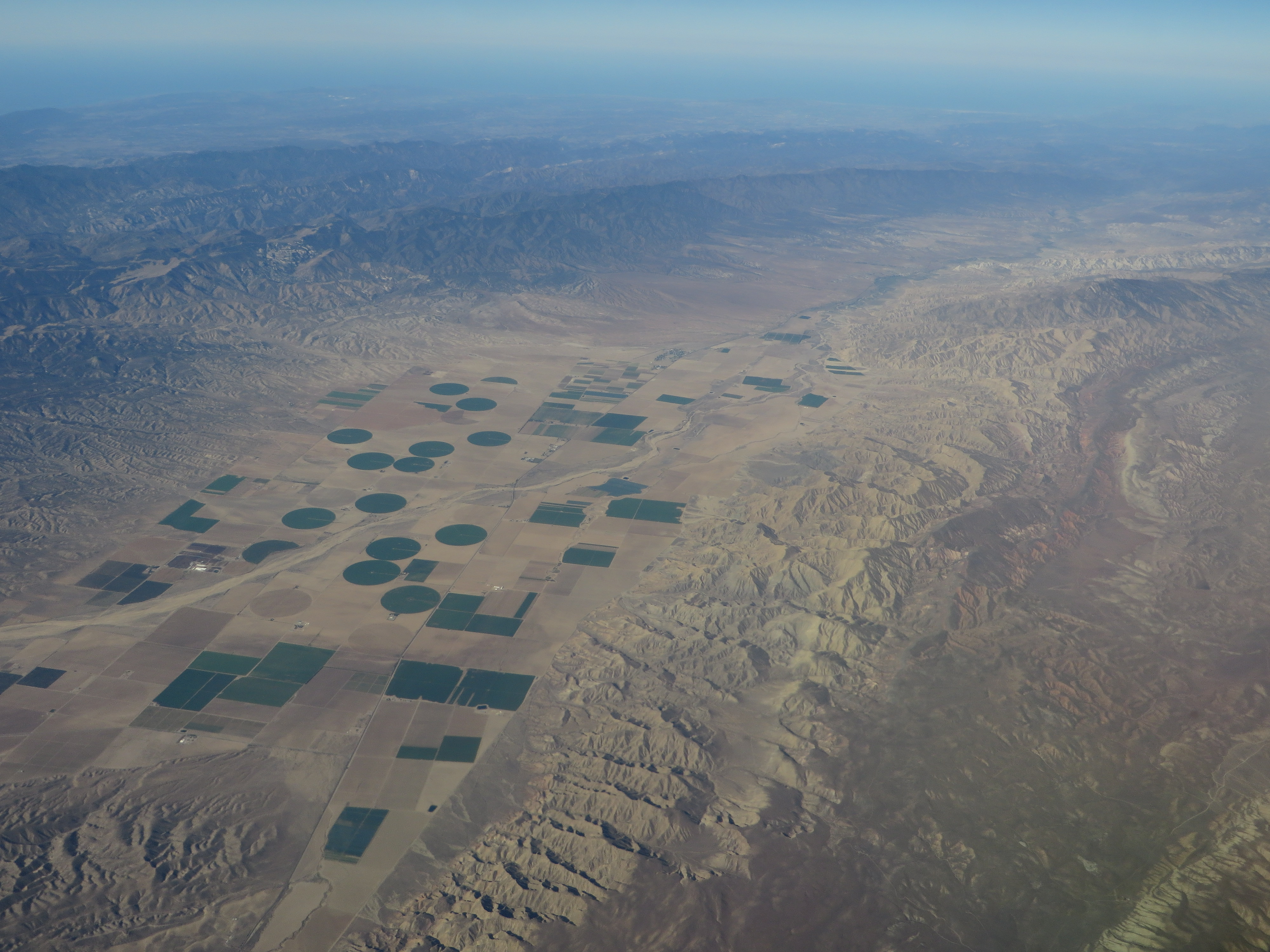
New Cuyama in a 2015 aerial photo of the Cuyama Valley

New Cuyama (Chumash: Kuyam, meaning "Clam") is a census-designated place in the Cuyama Valley, Santa Barbara County, California, United States. It was named after the Chumash word for "clams", most likely due to the millions of petrified prehistoric clamshell fossils that are found in the surrounding areas. The town is home to most of the utility infrastructure for its residents, including nearby neighbor Cuyama. New Cuyama is located very close to the intersection points for Santa Barbara, San Luis Obispo, Ventura and Kern counties. The town is served by Highway 166 (connecting U.S. Route 101 and Interstate 5) and the public-use New Cuyama Airport. The population was 542 at the 2020 census.

== History ==
The area was considered territory of the Yokuts people, but Chumash Indians from the Pacific Coast are also known to have frequented the area. The imprint of an old Indian trail can still be seen leading over the hills of present-day Ventura County to the headwaters of Piru Creek. The name "Cuyama" comes from an Indian village named for the Chumash word kuyam, meaning "clam" or "freshwater mollusk".

The area's recorded history dates to 1822, when Mexico won independence from Spain and took over the Spanish colony of Alta California. Two Mexican land grants, the Rancho Cuyama (Lataillade) and Rancho Cuyama (Rojo), were granted in the 1840s by Governors Manuel Micheltorena and Pío Pico in the lower Cuyama Valley along the Cuyama River, where present-day New Cuyama is, privatizing ownership of the land.

Following the 1949 discovery of oil at the South Cuyama Oil Field, in 1952 the Atlantic Richfield Company (ARCO) settled and developed the town of New Cuyama, building housing and associated commercial business – including the New Cuyama Airport (L88), reopened in May 2015, which bears the distinction of being the only public-use paved airport within easy flying range of Los Angeles for more than 50 miles (80 km). Much of the infrastructure from ARCO's settling of the town still exists today and is used by town residents. The original ARCO-built gas processing plant is still in use and easily seen due south of New Cuyama, though ARCO has since sold off interest in the facility.

The town of New Cuyama, at its founding, was considered the pearl of eastern Santa Barbara County, due to the flow of oil that was coming out of the region. During this time ARCO built the town, funded schools and provided all the important utilities other than electricity. Now that oil and gas production have declined, the principal industry is once again agriculture.

In 2024, Santa Barbara County approved the construction of a mixed-use development project, including 33 residential units, in New Cuyama.

== Geography ==
New Cuyama is located at 34°56′53″N 119°41′21″W (34.947933, -119.68915). It is situated in the Cuyama Valley.

According to the United States Census Bureau, the CDP covers an area of 0.6 square mile (1.6 km^{2}), all land.

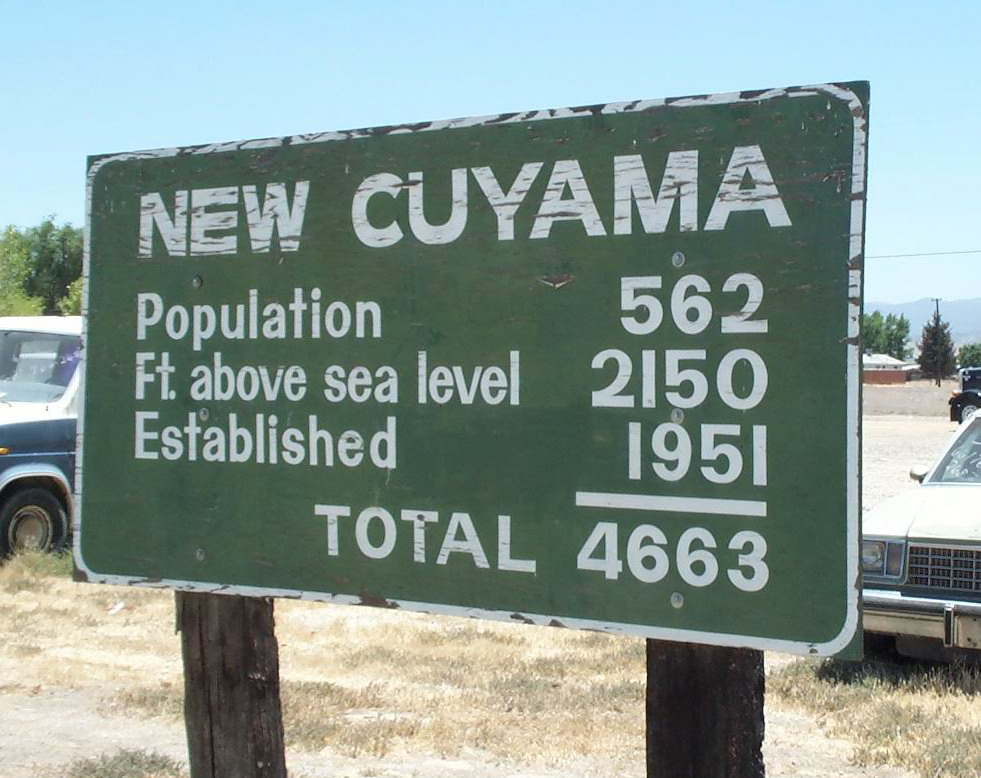
Humorous sign, 4923 Primero St., New Cuyama (note the total)

=== Climate ===
New Cuyama has a steppe climate (BSk). This region experiences hot and dry summers, with the warmest month having a daily mean of 75 degrees.

Climate data for New Cuyama, California, 1991–2020 normals, extremes 1974–present
Month	Jan	Feb	Mar	Apr	May	Jun	Jul	Aug	Sep	Oct	Nov	Dec	Year
Record high °F (°C)	88 (31)	87 (31)	90 (32)	97 (36)	106 (41)	108 (42)	110 (43)	108 (42)	109 (43)	102 (39)	92 (33)	84 (29)	110 (43)
Mean maximum °F (°C)	75.7 (24.3)	76.9 (24.9)	80.6 (27.0)	87.5 (30.8)	94.6 (34.8)	99.9 (37.7)	103.6 (39.8)	102.8 (39.3)	99.3 (37.4)	92.5 (33.6)	83.8 (28.8)	74.8 (23.8)	105.2 (40.7)
Mean daily maximum °F (°C)	61.1 (16.2)	62.0 (16.7)	65.6 (18.7)	70.9 (21.6)	79.5 (26.4)	88.3 (31.3)	94.6 (34.8)	93.5 (34.2)	88.9 (31.6)	78.4 (25.8)	67.6 (19.8)	60.6 (15.9)	75.9 (24.4)
Daily mean °F (°C)	47.1 (8.4)	48.1 (8.9)	51.2 (10.7)	55.2 (12.9)	62.4 (16.9)	69.8 (21.0)	75.6 (24.2)	74.5 (23.6)	70.2 (21.2)	60.9 (16.1)	51.8 (11.0)	46.4 (8.0)	59.4 (15.2)
Mean daily minimum °F (°C)	33.2 (0.7)	34.1 (1.2)	36.9 (2.7)	39.5 (4.2)	45.3 (7.4)	51.4 (10.8)	56.7 (13.7)	55.5 (13.1)	51.5 (10.8)	43.4 (6.3)	36.1 (2.3)	32.2 (0.1)	43.0 (6.1)
Mean minimum °F (°C)	23.2 (−4.9)	24.8 (−4.0)	28.0 (−2.2)	30.0 (−1.1)	36.4 (2.4)	41.5 (5.3)	48.4 (9.1)	47.4 (8.6)	42.8 (6.0)	33.2 (0.7)	25.8 (−3.4)	22.3 (−5.4)	19.8 (−6.8)
Record low °F (°C)	6 (−14)	14 (−10)	18 (−8)	22 (−6)	25 (−4)	29 (−2)	35 (2)	35 (2)	31 (−1)	17 (−8)	15 (−9)	7 (−14)	6 (−14)
Average precipitation inches (mm)	1.49 (38)	1.62 (41)	1.49 (38)	0.48 (12)	0.28 (7.1)	0.03 (0.76)	0.10 (2.5)	0.01 (0.25)	0.08 (2.0)	0.22 (5.6)	0.46 (12)	1.10 (28)	7.36 (187.21)
Average precipitation days (≥ 0.01 in)	6.3	6.6	5.1	2.9	1.7	0.2	0.4	0.1	0.6	1.5	2.6	4.9	32.9
Source 1: NOAA
Source 2: National Weather Service

== Demographics ==
Historical population
Census	Pop.	Note	%±
2010	517		—
2020	542		4.8%
U.S. Decennial Census; 1860–1870 1880-1890; 1900 1910 1920; 1930 1940 1950; 1960 1970 1980; 1990 2000 2010; 2020

New Cuyama first appeared as a census designated place in the 2010 U.S. census.

=== Racial and ethnic composition ===
New Cuyama CDP, California – Racial and ethnic composition Note: the US Census treats Hispanic/Latino as an ethnic category. This table excludes Latinos from the racial categories and assigns them to a separate category. Hispanics/Latinos may be of any race.
Race / Ethnicity (NH = Non-Hispanic)	Pop 2010	Pop 2020	% 2010	% 2020
White alone (NH)	268	178	51.84%	32.84%
Black or African American alone (NH)	3	2	0.58%	0.37%
Native American or Alaska Native alone (NH)	2	6	0.39%	1.11%
Asian alone (NH)	3	1	0.58%	0.18%
Native Hawaiian or Pacific Islander alone (NH)	0	0	0.00%	0.00%
Other race alone (NH)	0	0	0.00%	0.00%
Mixed race or Multiracial (NH)	7	20	1.35%	3.69%
Hispanic or Latino (any race)	234	335	45.26%	61.81%
Total	517	542	100.00%	100.00%

=== 2020 ===
The 2020 United States census reported that New Cuyama had a population of 542. The population density was 857.6 inhabitants per square mile (331.1/km^{2}). The racial makeup of New Cuyama was 252 (46.5%) White, 2 (0.4%) African American, 9 (1.7%) Native American, 1 (0.2%) Asian, 0 (0.0%) Pacific Islander, 209 (38.6%) from other races, and 69 (12.7%) from two or more races. Hispanic or Latino of any race were 335 persons (61.8%).

The whole population lived in households. There were 200 households, out of which 54 (27.0%) had children under the age of 18 living in them, 105 (52.5%) were married-couple households, 15 (7.5%) were cohabiting couple households, 39 (19.5%) had a female householder with no partner present, and 41 (20.5%) had a male householder with no partner present. 56 households (28.0%) were one person, and 25 (12.5%) were one person aged 65 or older. The average household size was 2.71. There were 130 families (65.0% of all households).

The age distribution was 143 people (26.4%) under the age of 18, 43 people (7.9%) aged 18 to 24, 118 people (21.8%) aged 25 to 44, 144 people (26.6%) aged 45 to 64, and 94 people (17.3%) who were 65 years of age or older. The median age was 39.9 years. For every 100 females, there were 122.1 males.

There were 222 housing units at an average density of 351.3 units per square mile (135.6 units/km^{2}), of which 200 (90.1%) were occupied. Of these, 140 (70.0%) were owner-occupied, and 60 (30.0%) were occupied by renters.

== See also ==
- Ranchos of California
