= Acontiophoridae =

Scientific classification
- Kingdom: Animalia
- Phylum: Cnidaria
- Subphylum: Anthozoa
- Class: Hexacorallia
- Order: Actiniaria
- Superfamily: Metridioidea
- Family: Acontiophoridae; Carlgren, 1938

Synonyms
- Ramireziidae

Family of sea anemones

Acontiophoridae is a family of sea anemones.

== Genera ==
The following genera are recognized:

- Acontiophorum Carlgren, 1938
- Mimetridium Hand, 1961
- Ramirezia Zamponi, 1979
