= Stunt Ranch Santa Monica Mountains Reserve =

Reserve and biological field station in Calabasas, California

Stunt Ranch Santa Monica Mountains Reserve aka UCLA Stunt Ranch
- Location within California Location within the United States
- Location: Calabasas, California, Los Angeles County
- Coordinates: 34°5′27″N 118°39′27″W
- Area: 310 acres (0.48 mi^{2})
- Governing body: University of California
- Website: http://stuntranch.ucnrs.org

Stunt Ranch Santa Monica Mountains Reserve, also known as UCLA Stunt Ranch, is a 121-hectare (310-acre) University of California Natural Reserve System reserve and biological field station located in Los Angeles County. The reserve protects habitat surrounded by the Santa Monica Mountains National Recreation Area. The address is 1201 Stunt Road, Calabasas, California.

Located 13 km (8 miles) north of the town of Malibu, the reserve is administered by the University of California, Los Angeles.

== History ==
Although humans have occupied the Santa Monica Mountains for at least 10,000 years, the oldest human artifacts found on the reserve date from 1,000 to 3,000 years before the present. These include soapstone bowl fragments, hammerstones, and mortars. In more modern times, the area was occupied by the Gabrielino and Chumash people.

The first Europeans to settle in the Cold Creek watershed were the Stunt family, who arrived in the area from England in the late 1800s. Ethel Stunt bequeathed the ranch to Occidental College as a field station in 1971. The property was bought by the state in 1979. The University of California obtained the property and made it part of the UC Natural Reserve System in 1995.

== Geography ==
The reserve is located within the Santa Monica Mountains, part of the Transverse Ranges of California. The range is oriented east to west due to a dogleg of the San Andreas Fault. The predominantly north–south movement of the Pacific Plate stalls along this dogleg. As the Pacific tectonic plate compresses against the North American plate, the crust uplift to form the Transverse Ranges.

Stunt Ranch reserve is oriented around perennial Cold Creek, a tributary of Malibu Creek. Cold Creek is the only stream in the Santa Monica Mountains that flows north to south.

== Natural history ==
The reserve includes riparian corridor lined with willow, coast live oak (Quercus agrifolia) and California bay (Umbellularia californica). Farther from the creek, reserve slopes are dominated by drought-tolerant chaparral featuring species such as chamise (Adenostema fasciculatum) and bigpod ceanothus (Ceanothus megacarpus).

The largely wild mountain range gives big carnivores such as mountain lion (Puma concolor) and bobcat (Lynx rufus) room to roam within largely urban Los Angeles. In fact, the reserve is a site for research on the effects of rodenticides on predators. These carnivores prey on mule deer (Odocoileus hemionus), rodents, and rabbits are among reserve herbivores.

== Education ==
Thousands of schoolchildren from largely urban Los Angeles neighborhoods visit the reserve on field trips each year. Since 1977, the Cold Creek Docents have led these lessons on ecology and the human history of the Santa Monica Mountains.
