= Scripps Coastal Reserve =

Protected area of San Diego County, California

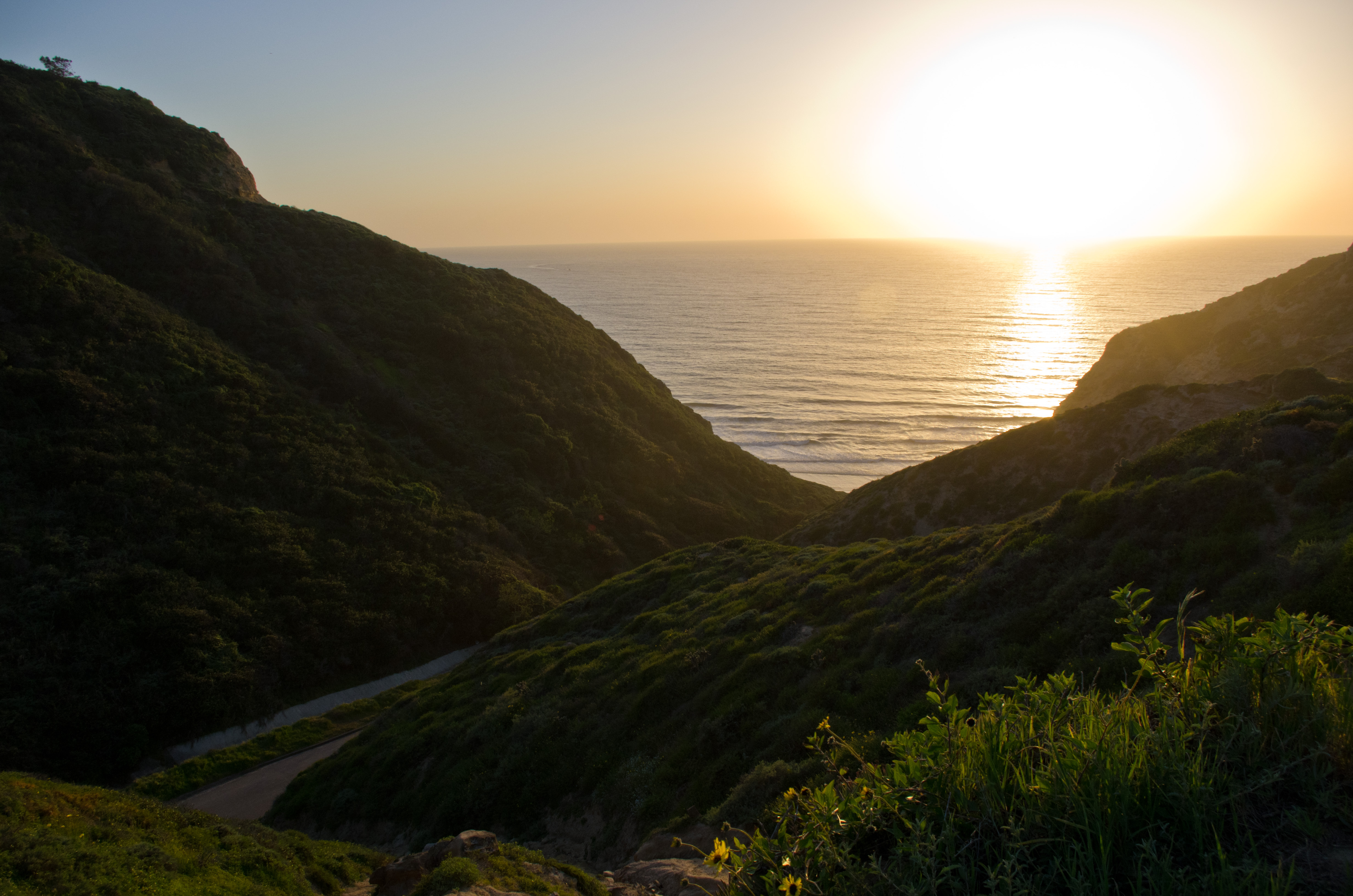
- The path to Black's Beach through Scripps Coastal Reserve

- Location within California Location within the United States
- Location: La Jolla, California
- Coordinates: 32°52′31.4468″N 117°14′55.0525″W
- Area: 126 acres (0.197 mi^{2})
- Governing body: University of California, San Diego
- Website: http://nrs.ucsd.edu/reserves/kendall.html

Scripps Coastal Reserve is a 126-acre (51-hectare) site with the University of California Natural Reserve System reserve located west of UC San Diego in the La Jolla Farms area of La Jolla, California. Administered by UC San Diego, the site is owned by the University of California and is primarily managed for teaching and research.

The reserve includes an 80-acre underwater and shoreline reserve and a 46-acre aboveground knoll. The underwater reserve comprises coastal areas that are now part of the San Diego-Scripps Coastal Marine Conservation Area. The knoll includes a publicly accessible mesa, trails through Black's Canyon, and the privately owned but university-administered Sumner Canyon.

The route begins by walking through areas dominated by coastal sagebrush and California encelia or bush sunflower. Along the trail, you'll eventually want to look inland to see an area under various stages of restoration. Over 80% of original coastal sage scrub was lost by 1980 to agriculture and urbanization, with remaining fragments facing pressure from invasion by non-native plant species.

== History ==
The underwater component of Scripps Coastal Reserve was purchased from the State in 1929. In 1967, the University of California purchased the William Black House and the adjacent knoll from William H. Black.

== Ecology ==
- Birds
- Flora
- Herptiles
- Mammals

== Use ==
The marsh is used by Scripps Institution of Oceanography students and scientists to study coastal flora, fauna and microbes, as well as determine appropriate and novel strategies for environmental preservation and conservation. Its proximity to Black's Beach also makes it a moderately frequented route for tourists and surfers.
