= Ramirezia =

Scientific classification
- Domain: Eukaryota
- Kingdom: Animalia
- Phylum: Cnidaria
- Subphylum: Anthozoa
- Class: Hexacorallia
- Order: Actiniaria
- Family: Acontiophoridae
- Genus: Ramirezia; Zamponi, 1980
- Species: R. balsae

Binomial name
- Ramirezia balsae Zamponi, 1980

Genus of sea anemones

Ramirezia is a genus of sea anemones of the family Acontiophoridae. It currently includes only one species.

== Species ==
The following species are recognized:

- Ramirezia balsae Zamponi, 1980

== Distribution ==
This species was described from Argentina.
