= Quail Ridge Reserve =

Nature reserve in northern California

- Location within California Location within the United States
- Location: Napa County, California
- Coordinates: 38°49′04″N 122°14′28″W
- Area: 2,000 acres (3.1 mi^{2})
- Governing body: University of California, Davis
- Website: https://naturalreserves.ucdavis.edu/quail-ridge-reserve

Quail Ridge Reserve is a 2,000-acre (810 ha) nature reserve in northern California. It is located in the vicinity of Lake Berryessa and the Blue Ridge Berryessa Natural Area, in Napa County, California.

The Quail Ridge Reserve is administered by the University of California, Davis, and is a unit of the University of California Natural Reserve System.

The habitat protected is of the California interior chaparral and woodlands plant community. Quail Ridge Reserve is also the location of QuRiNet, a wireless mesh network.

== See also ==
- McLaughlin Natural Reserve
- California chaparral and woodlands
