= Rancho Tinaquaic =

Land grant in California

Coordinates: 34.810°N 120.200°W

Rancho Tinaquaic was a 8,875-acre (35.92 km^{2}) Mexican land grant in present-day Santa Barbara County, California given in 1837 by Governor Juan B. Alvarado to Víctor Pantaleón Linares. Benjamin Foxen who had later purchased the Rancho was the claimant in the 1852 land case. The grant comprised most of what is now known as Foxen Canyon, northeast of Los Alamos.

== History ==
The original grant of the two leagues of Rancho Tinaquaic was made in 1837, the grantee was Víctor Pantaleón Linares a Mexican soldier who had come to California in the 1820s. It subsequently came into the hands of William B. Foxen, the claimant before the Land Commission in 1852.

William Benjamin (Guillermo Domingo) Foxen (1798–1874), a native of Norwich, England was a seaman who came to Santa Barbara in 1828, in the ship Courier. Foxen left the ship and later after converting to the Catholic religion, was baptized as Guillermo Domingo Foxen. He married Eduarda Osuña, the stepdaughter of Tomás Olivera of Rancho Tepusquet in 1831. He had three children with his wife, and was engaged in trade in Santa Barbara. In 1837, at the age of 38 he became a naturalized Mexican citizen. Foxen acquired the two square league grant of Rancho Tinaquaic, just upstream from his father-in-law's rancho, probably in 1842. The map of the Tinaquaic rancho, Diseño del Rancho Tinaquaic for the grant dates from 1842. 1842 is the same year that Víctor Pantaleón Linares, the original grantee of Rancho Tinaquaic, was granted Rancho Cañada de los Osos nearby San Luis Obispo where Linares had moved in 1839 and settled in the town as the Mission majordomo and alférez in the local militia.

In 1846 during the Mexican–American War, Foxen guided John C. Frémont over the Santa Ynez Mountains at San Marcos Pass. The Californios felt he was a traitor to his adopted country Mexico, and his property was raided several times. In a confrontation in 1848, Foxen killed Agustín Dávila of Rancho Corral de Cuati. Foxen was sentenced to four years in jail.

With the cession of California to the United States following the Mexican–American War, the 1848 Treaty of Guadalupe Hidalgo provided that the land grants would be honored. As required by the Land Act of 1851, a claim for Rancho Tinaquaic was filed with the Public Land Commission in 1852, and the grant was patented to Benjamin Foxen in 1872.

== Historic sites of the Rancho ==
- Benjamin Foxen Memorial Chapel. The San Ramon Chapel was built in 1875 by son-in-law and his daughter, Frederick and Ramona (Foxen) Wickenden.

== See also ==
- Ranchos of California
- List of Ranchos of California
