= Sedgwick Reserve =

Nature reserve in Santa Barbara County, California

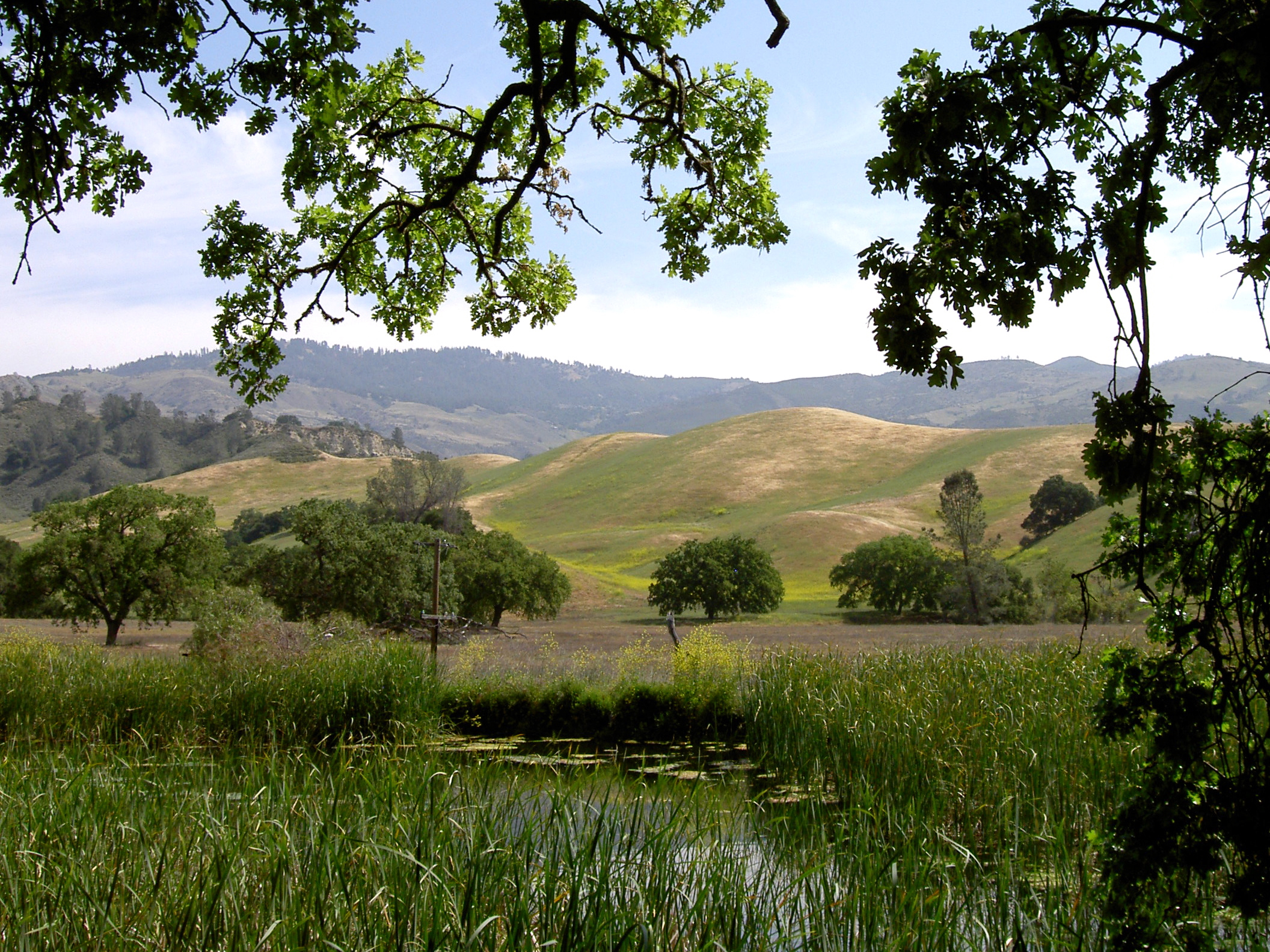

- Location within California Location within the United States
- Location: San Rafael Mountains, Santa Barbara County.
- Nearest city: Santa Ynez
- Coordinates: 34°42′N 120°1′W
- Area: 5,896 acres (9.213 mi^{2})
- Governing body: University of California, Santa Barbara

Sedgwick Reserve is a 5,896-acre (2,386 ha) nature reserve in Santa Barbara County, California, United States. It is located in the San Rafael Mountains, 35 miles north of Santa Barbara near the town of Santa Ynez. Formerly part of Rancho La Laguna, the reserve is now used for natural science research and education as it includes a wide range of native ecosystems, such as vernal pools, chaparral, and coastal sage scrub.

Administered by the University of California, Santa Barbara, it is a unit of the University of California Natural Reserve System. The reserve hosts researchers, classes, and relevant meetings at a small complex of buildings in the field station. The reserve does not have public hiking trails, and is closed to the public except for registered and ticketed events.

The reserve hosted the Prescribed Fire Training Exchange (TREX) held November 12-19, 2022 and November 10-19, 2023 with a controlled fire by firefighters. The training on how to safely conduct prescribed burns, seminars on local fire ecology, and tribal burning included Santa Barbara County Fire Department, employees of the Santa Ynez Band of Chumash Indians, The Nature Conservancy, University of California Agriculture and Natural Resources, Vandenberg Space Force Base, scientists, ranchers, students, researchers, and land managers.

== See also ==
- California montane chaparral and woodlands
- Flora of the Transverse Ranges
