= QuRiNet =

Wireless mesh network

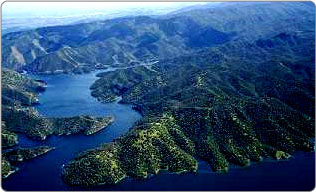
View of Quail Ridge Reserve

The Quail Ridge Wireless Mesh Network project is an effort to provide a wireless communications infrastructure to the Quail Ridge Reserve, a wildlife reserve in California in the United States. The network is intended to benefit on-site ecological research and provide a wireless mesh network tested for development and analysis. The project is a collaboration between the University of California Natural Reserve System and the Networks Lab at the Department of Computer Science, UC Davis.

== Project ==
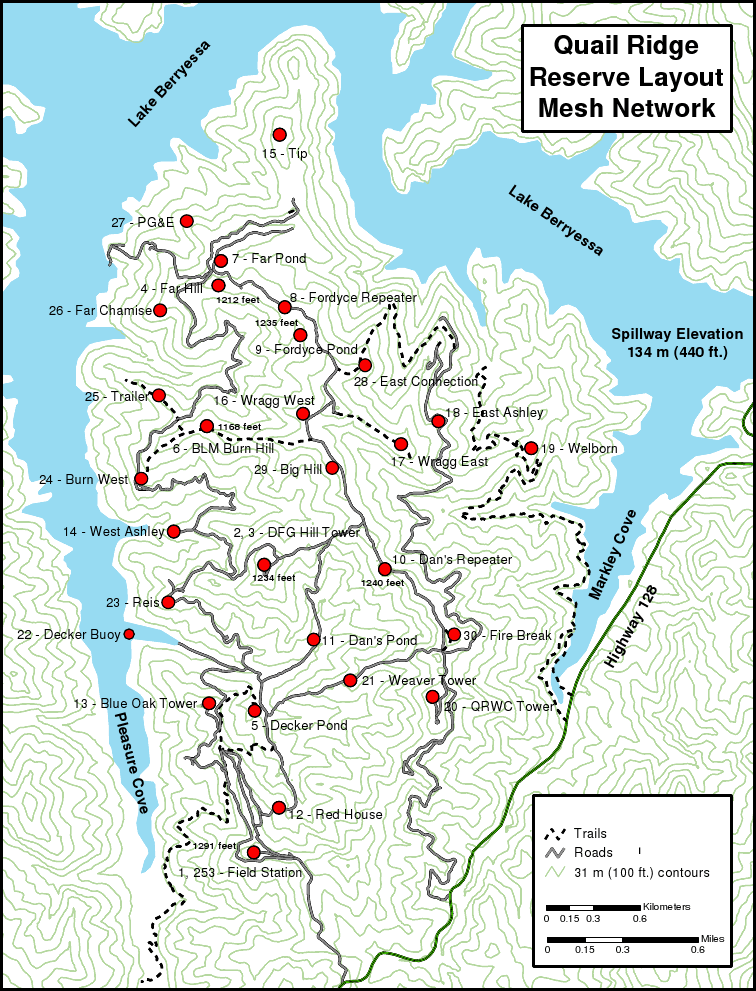
Map of the Quail Ridge Reserve wireless mesh network

The large-scale wireless mesh network would consist of various sensor networks gathering temperature, visual, and acoustic data at certain locations. This information would then be stored at the field station or relayed further over Ethernet. The backbone nodes would also serve as access points enabling wireless access at their locations.

The Quail Ridge Reserve would also be used for further research into wireless mesh networks.
