= Western Society of Naturalists =

Scientific organization

The Western Society of Naturalists is a scientific organization with a strong focus on promoting the study of marine biology. Most of its members are on the Pacific coast of North America. Originally established in 1910 as the Biological Society of the Pacific, it changed its name in 1916. It held its first meeting under the new name in San Diego on August 10, 1916, where papers on zoology and botany were presented.

== Naturalist of the Year Award ==
The Naturalist of the Year Award was established in 1999 at the suggestion of Paul Dayton to "recognize those unsung heroes who define our future by inspiring young people with the wonders and sheer joy of natural history".

Year	Name	Affiliation
1999	Larry Harris	University of New Hampshire
2000	Chuck Baxter	Hopkins Marine Station, Stanford University
2001	Pamela Roe	California State University, Stanislaus
2002	John M. Engle	University of California, Santa Barbara
2003	Jeanne Bellemin	El Camino College
2004	Kathy Ann Miller	University of California, Berkeley
2005	James M. Watanabe	Hopkins Marine Station, Stanford University
2006	Brian Bingham	Western Washington University
2007	Genevieve Anderson	Santa Barbara City College
2007	Shane Anderson	University of California, Santa Barbara
2008	Terrie Klinger	University of Washington
2009	Jenn Caselle	University of California, Santa Barbara
2010	Shara Fisler	Ocean Discovery Institute
2011	Megan Dethier	Friday Harbor Laboratories, University of Washington
2012	Mark Carr	University of California, Santa Cruz
2012	Pete Raimondi	University of California, Santa Cruz
2013	Dan Richards	Channel Islands National Park
2014	Steve Lonhart	Monterey Bay National Marine Sanctuary, NOAA
2015	Milton Love	UC Santa Barbara
2016	Jackie Sones	Bodega Marine Reserve, UC Davis
2017	Jeff Goddard	Marine Science Institute, UC Santa Barbara
2018	Andy Lamb	
2019	Diana Steller	Moss Landing Marine Laboratories, California State University
2020	Rosemary Romero	Greater Farallones Association
2021	Paul Barber	University of California, Los Angeles
2021	Peggy Fong	University of California, Los Angeles
