= Kendall-Frost Mission Bay Marsh Reserve =

University of California Natural Reserve System reserve

- Location within California Location within the United States
- Location: San Diego, California
- Coordinates: 32°47′N 117°13′W
- Area: 20 acres (0.031 mi^{2})
- Governing body: University of California, San Diego
- Website: http://nrs.ucsd.edu/reserves/kendall.html

The Kendall-Frost Mission Bay Marsh Reserve is a 20-acre (16 hectare) University of California Natural Reserve System reserve on the northern shore of Mission Bay in San Diego, California. Administered by UC San Diego, the site is owned by the University of California and managed for teaching and research.

The reserve protects some of the last remaining coastal salt marsh in Mission Bay. The city of San Diego's adjacent Northern Wildlife Preserve expands this wetland habitat to approximately 40 acres (32 hectares).

== History ==
In 1952, Lena Kendall and the A. H. Frost estate donated two parcels of the upper marsh to the University of California. In 1965, the site became one of the first seven reserves in the newly established Natural Lands and Water Reserve System, now known as the University of California Natural Reserve System.

== Ecology ==
The reserve ranges from high marsh to submerged shoreline and include coastal salt marsh, mudflats, tidal channels, and salt flats. Subtidal habitats feature eelgrass beds that shelter juvenile fish and invertebrates. Algae and bacterial mats coating mudflats exposed by high tide feed shorebirds and other species. The salt marsh supports California cordgrass (Spartina foliosa) and perennial pickleweed (Salicornia pacifica). Slightly higher in elevation is the midmarsh zone, with salt-tolerant plants such as sea lavender (Limonium californicum) and saltmarsh daisy (Jaumea carnosa). The drier high marsh is dominated by plants such as rambling sea-blite (Suaeda californica) and saltgrass (Distichlis spicata).

As one of few wetlands in the San Diego area, the reserve attracts many bird species. These include many shorebirds such as long-billed curlew (Numenius americanus) and one of California's rarest birds, the light-footed clapper rail (Rallus longirostris levipes). Artificial nesting platforms at the reserve were established for the rail in 1987; these keep eggs and chicks dry during high tides yet safe from land predators such as feral cats and raccoons.

The tidal channels of the marsh shelter native fishes such as the California killifish (Fundulus parvipinnis), which live in hypersaline pools, and longjaw mudsuckers (Gillichthys mirabilis), while arrow gobies (Clevelandia ios) live in burrows often occupied by ghost shrimp (Neotrypaea californiensis).

== Use ==
The marsh is used by students and scientists to study salt marsh ecology and practice field research techniques. Restoration efforts, such as a project to rid the marsh of invasive mangrove, have helped to improve the functioning of the habitat and improve conditions for native species.
