= Acontiophorum =

Scientific classification
- Domain: Eukaryota
- Kingdom: Animalia
- Phylum: Cnidaria
- Class: Hexacorallia
- Order: Actiniaria
- Family: Acontiophoridae
- Genus: Acontiophorum; Carlgren, 1938

Family of sea anemones

Acontiophorum is a genus of sea anemones of the family Acontiophoridae.

== Species ==
The following species are recognized:

- Acontiophorum bombayense Parulekar, 1968
- Acontiophorum mortenseni Carlgren, 1938
- Acontiophorum niveum Fautin, Eppard & Mead, 1988
