= Rancho Cuyama (Lataillade) =

Land grant in California

Coordinates: 34.930°N 119.650°W

Rancho Cuyama (No. 2) was a 48,827-acre (197.60 km^{2}) Mexican land grant in present day eastern Santa Barbara County, California given in 1846 by Governor Pío Pico to Cesario Lataillade. The grant extended along Cuyama River in the Cuyama Valley, near Cuyama and New Cuyama. There were two Mexican land grants made in the lower Cuyama Valley: on the north Rancho Cuyama (No. 1) granted in 1843 and to the south Rancho Cuyama (No. 2) granted in 1846.

== History ==
Cesario Armand Lataillade (1819–1849) was a French trader involved in the hide and tallow trade who came to Santa Barbara in 1841. He married Antonia María de la Guerra (1827–), the fourth and youngest daughter of José de la Guerra y Noriega, in 1845. Lataillade was granted the eleven square league Rancho Cuyama (No. 2). Lataillade acquired Rancho Cuyama (No. 1), Rancho La Zaca, and Rancho Corral de Cuati. Lataillade was killed in an accident in 1849, and the properties inherited by his widow and their two children, Maria Antonia Lataillade (1846–1916) and Cesario Eugene Lataillade (1849–).

With the cession of California to the United States following the Mexican-American War, the 1848 Treaty of Guadalupe Hidalgo provided that the land grants would be honored. As required by the Land Act of 1851, a claim for Rancho Cuyama was filed with the Public Land Commission in 1852, and the grant was patented to María Antonia de la Guerra y Lataillade in 1879. The family sold the Rancho Cuyama (No. 2) to pay legal fees.

== See also ==
- Ranchos of California
- List of Ranchos of California
- Alexis Godey
