= Motte Rimrock Reserve =

Unit of the University of California Natural Reserve System

- Location within California Location within the United States
- Location: Riverside County, California
- Coordinates: 33°48′45″N 117°15′30″W
- Area: 736 acres (1.150 mi^{2})
- Governing body: University of California, Riverside
- Website: https://motte.ucr.edu/

The Motte Rimrock Reserve, a unit of the University of California Natural Reserve System affiliated with the University of California, Riverside, is an ecological reserve and biological field station located on a small plateau overlooking the Perris Valley in west-central Riverside County, California, United States.

== Location ==
The reserve is located on 736 acres (2.98 km^{2}) at an elevation of 1,580 feet (482 m) ASL, northwest of the city of Perris. Much of the land of the Motte Rimrock Reserve was donated to the University of California in 1976 by Charles and Ottie Motte. Numerous parcels have been added since.

== Ecology ==
The Motte Rimrock Reserve contains large areas of open grassland, coastal sage scrub, willow riparian woodland, and rocky outcrops that support a diversity of plant and animal species. The reserve harbors a mixture of both coastal and inland species and owes its diversity to its location equidistant between the Pacific Ocean and the Mojave Desert. The reserve also possesses a rich cultural history including some recognized archeological sites. Current on-going research projects include studies on the population dynamics of small mammals, ant behavior, plant-insect interactions, and habitat restoration.

== Wildlife ==
As the surrounding area experiences rapid urbanization, the reserve serves to protect a number of species threatened or endangered by development and habitat loss including Stephens' kangaroo rat, the California gnatcatcher, orange-throated whiptail, and Bell's Sparrow, as well as several diminishing plant communities such as riversidean sage scrub. The reserve is an active participant in the Riverside County Habitat Conservation Agency (RCHCA) a joint powers authority created to protect and preserve the Stephens' kangaroo rat.

The director of the reserve is Kenneth J. Halama, PhD, an ecologist and conservation biologist.

== See also ==
- Peninsular Ranges
- California chaparral and woodlands
