= Sagehen Creek Field Station =

Facility of UC Berkeley

- Location within California Location within the United States
- Location: Nevada County, California
- Coordinates: 39°25′57″N 120°14′13″W
- Governing body: University of California, Berkeley
- Website: http://sagehen.ucnrs.org/

Sagehen Creek Field Station is a research and teaching facility of the University of California at Berkeley's Office of the Vice Chancellor for Research, the Berkeley Natural History Museums & the University of California Natural Reserve System. Sagehen is also a member of the Organization of Biological Field Stations.

The Station was established in 1951 with the signing of a long-term special use permit with the USDA Forest Service; today, this relationship includes the Tahoe National Forest which manages the land, & the Pacific Southwest Research Station, which created the Sagehen Experimental Forest on 28 Nov. 2005.

Sagehen serves as the hub of a much broader network of research areas known as the Central Sierra Field Research Stations. CSFRS consists of:

- Sagehen Creek Field Station
- Central Sierra Snow Laboratory
- Onion Creek Experimental Watershed
- Chickering American Reserve
- North Fork Association Lands

The Station is not generally open to the public. However, Sagehen hosts periodic public events.

Sagehen also maintains a public news blog and video log.

== Climate ==
Sagehen Creek has a continental Mediterranean climate (Köppen Dsb) with subarctic climate (Köppen Dfc) characteristics, especially due to 264.9 days of the year seeing at or below freezing lows, which even happen several days in the summer.

Climate data for Sagehen Creek, California, 1991–2020 normals, 1966-2020 extremes: 6337ft (1932m)
Month	Jan	Feb	Mar	Apr	May	Jun	Jul	Aug	Sep	Oct	Nov	Dec	Year
Record high °F (°C)	62 (17)	64 (18)	72 (22)	78 (26)	84 (29)	90 (32)	96 (36)	95 (35)	90 (32)	85 (29)	70 (21)	62 (17)	96 (36)
Mean maximum °F (°C)	54.6 (12.6)	54.7 (12.6)	63.3 (17.4)	68.1 (20.1)	76.8 (24.9)	83.2 (28.4)	88.7 (31.5)	87.1 (30.6)	82.9 (28.3)	74.9 (23.8)	63.1 (17.3)	53.1 (11.7)	89.1 (31.7)
Mean daily maximum °F (°C)	40.1 (4.5)	40.5 (4.7)	48.3 (9.1)	52.9 (11.6)	62.0 (16.7)	71.8 (22.1)	79.8 (26.6)	79.2 (26.2)	72.6 (22.6)	61.4 (16.3)	49.4 (9.7)	38.8 (3.8)	58.1 (14.5)
Daily mean °F (°C)	27.7 (−2.4)	27.7 (−2.4)	33.4 (0.8)	37.5 (3.1)	45.1 (7.3)	52.2 (11.2)	58.4 (14.7)	57.3 (14.1)	51.6 (10.9)	42.9 (6.1)	34.8 (1.6)	26.5 (−3.1)	41.3 (5.2)
Mean daily minimum °F (°C)	15.4 (−9.2)	14.9 (−9.5)	18.5 (−7.5)	22.1 (−5.5)	28.2 (−2.1)	32.5 (0.3)	37.0 (2.8)	35.3 (1.8)	30.6 (−0.8)	24.5 (−4.2)	20.1 (−6.6)	14.3 (−9.8)	24.5 (−4.2)
Mean minimum °F (°C)	−4.4 (−20.2)	−0.8 (−18.2)	1.3 (−17.1)	10.9 (−11.7)	20.8 (−6.2)	24.1 (−4.4)	28.1 (−2.2)	27.1 (−2.7)	23.5 (−4.7)	15.6 (−9.1)	3.9 (−15.6)	−4.5 (−20.3)	−9.9 (−23.3)
Record low °F (°C)	−21 (−29)	−33 (−36)	−9 (−23)	−3 (−19)	10 (−12)	18 (−8)	24 (−4)	25 (−4)	16 (−9)	7 (−14)	−10 (−23)	−28 (−33)	−33 (−36)
Average precipitation inches (mm)	5.02 (128)	5.16 (131)	4.43 (113)	2.10 (53)	1.56 (40)	0.48 (12)	0.29 (7.4)	0.44 (11)	0.60 (15)	1.81 (46)	3.02 (77)	5.63 (143)	30.54 (776.4)
Average snowfall inches (cm)	40.9 (104)	45.0 (114)	36.9 (94)	7.1 (18)	1.9 (4.8)	0.4 (1.0)	0.0 (0.0)	0.0 (0.0)	0.5 (1.3)	2.5 (6.4)	21.8 (55)	32.8 (83)	189.8 (481.5)
Average precipitation days (≥ 0.01 in)	9.3	9.6	10.0	7.3	6.3	3.8	2.3	2.5	3.8	5.1	9.1	9.8	78.9
Source 1: NOAA (Independence Creek precipitation)
Source 2: XMACIS2 (1981-1998 snowfall, records & monthly max/mins)
