= Rancho La Laguna (Gutierrez) =

Land grant in California

Coordinates: 34.750°N 120.220°W

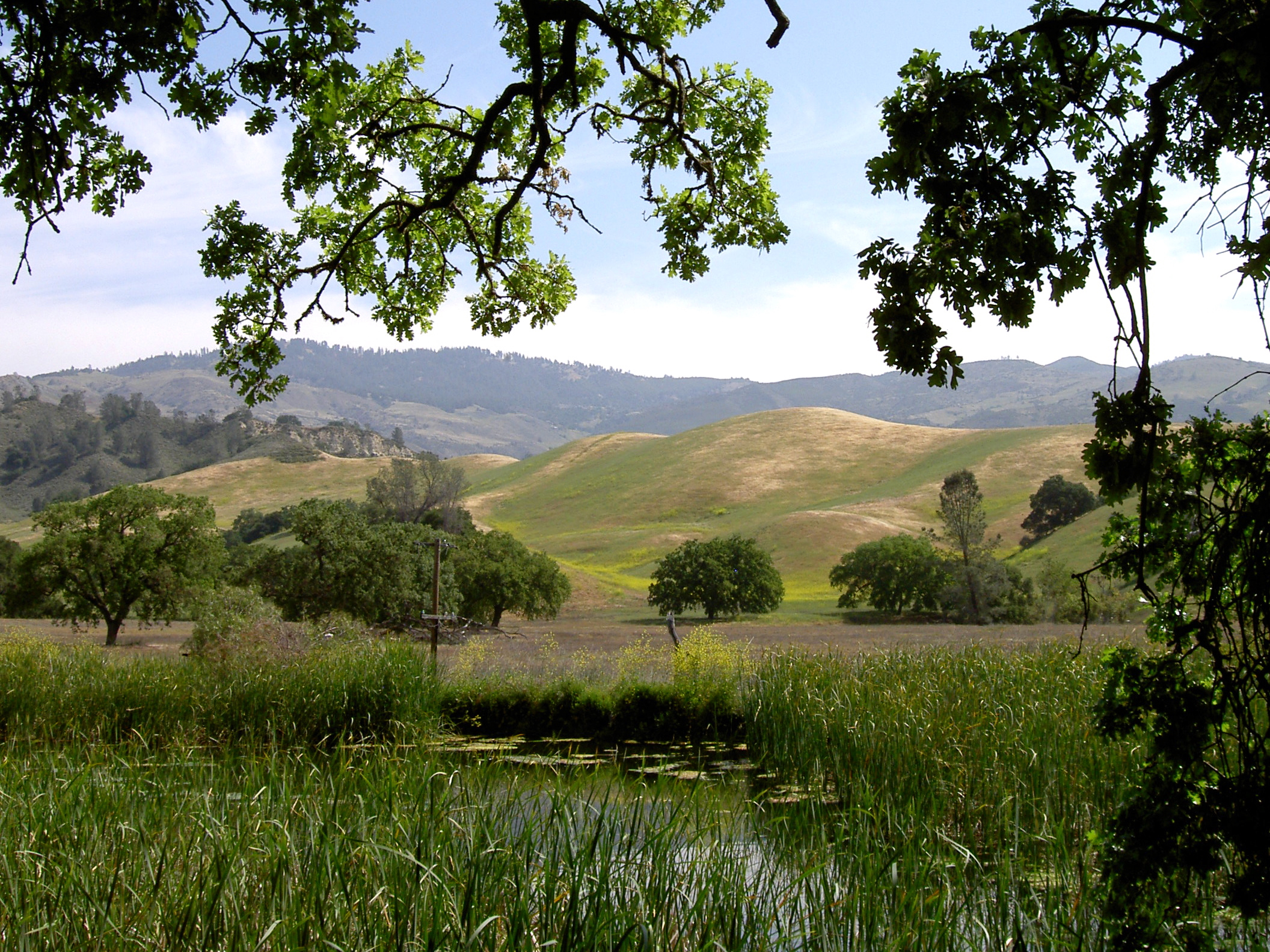
Sedgwick Reserve, a nature preserve on land that was part of the rancho

Rancho La Laguna was a 48,704-acre (197.10 km^{2}) Mexican land grant in present-day Santa Barbara County, California given in 1845 by Governor Pio Pico to Octaviano Gutierrez. The name means "the Lake". The grant extended along the Santa Ynez Valley east of present-day Los Alamos.

== History ==
Octaviano Gutierrez (1794–1866), born in Mexico City, Mexico, was a soldier at the Presidio of Santa Barbara. In 1827 he married Maria Caledonia Ruiz (1810–1893). When he retired as artillery sergeant of the Mexican army, he was granted the eleven square league Rancho La Laguna.

With the cession of California to the United States following the Mexican-American War, the 1848 Treaty of Guadalupe Hidalgo provided that the land grants would be honored. As required by the Land Act of 1851, a claim for Rancho La Laguna was filed with the Public Land Commission in 1852, and the grant was patented to Octaviano Gutierrez in 1867.

Gutierrez sold a large portion of the rancho to Dr. Samuel B. Brinkerhoff in 1865. Samuel Brinkerhoff (1824-1883) was born in New York and came to Santa Barbara in 1852 as the resident physician.

In 1876, San Francisco financier Thomas Bell along with his son John S. Bell, and James B. Shaw, purchased acreage from Rancho La Laguna and the neighboring Rancho Los Alamos. Both families allocated a half square mile from each of their new ranches to create the Los Alamos town site with "Centennial Street" as the central thoroughfare.

Part of the ranch was later acquired by the Sedgwick family and became the Sedgwick Reserve. Another part of the ranch became the Midland School.

== See also ==
- Ranchos of California
- List of ranchos of California
