= Bodega Marine Reserve =

Nature and marine reserve in California

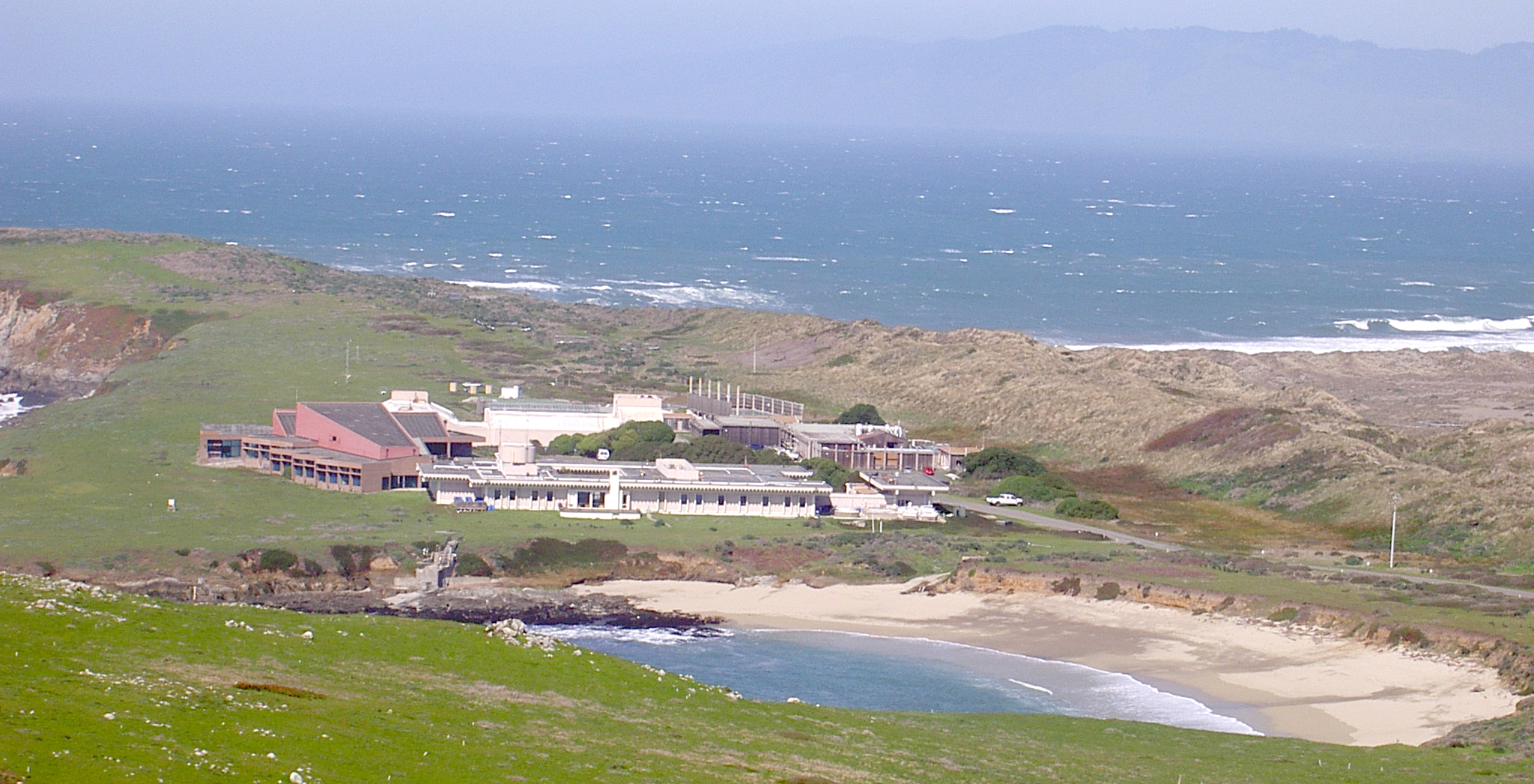
- Bodega Marine Lab from the south, looking across Horseshoe Cove of Bodega Bay

- Location within California Location within the United States
- Location: Sonoma County, California
- Coordinates: 38°19′3″N 123°4′19″W
- Area: 362 acres (0.566 mi^{2})
- Governing body: University of California, Davis
- Website: https://marinescience.ucdavis.edu/bml/bmr

Bodega Marine Reserve is a 362-acre (146 ha) nature reserve and marine reserve on the coast of northern California, located in the vicinity of the Bodega Marine Laboratory on Bodega Head. It is a unit of the University of California Natural Reserve System, administered by the University of California, Davis.

Along California's north central coast, BMR is the only marine area protected for research and education.

== Features ==
The reserve is adjacent to Bodega Bay and the open Pacific Ocean, on a peninsula in rural western Sonoma County.

Natural hazards of the area include high cliffs, sleeper waves, white sharks, poison oak, Lyme disease, hantavirus, skunks, and mountain lions.

== See also ==
- California coastal prairie
- Northern coastal scrub
- California coastal sage and chaparral ecoregion
