= Ventucopa, California =

Unincorporated community in California, United States

- Unincorporated community
- Location within California
- Coordinates: 34°49′53″N 119°28′8″W
- Country: United States
- State: California
- County: Santa Barbara
- ZIP code: 93252

Ventucopa is an unincorporated community in the southeastern Cuyama Valley, within eastern Santa Barbara County, California, United States. Ventucopa has a population of 92 people and is located an elevation of 2,896 feet (883 m). It is an agricultural area situated near the Cuyama River. It is located near the intersection of four counties: Santa Barbara, Ventura, San Luis Obispo and Kern. Ventucopa borders Los Padres National Forest to the east, south and west. When the town was registering a postal office in 1926, local resident Dean Parady came up with Ventucopa, as the community lies between Maricopa and Ventura County.

The ZIP Code is 93252, and the community is served by area code 661.

== Geography ==
The community is on the southern Maricopa Highway section of State Route 33, near an upper southern fork of the seasonally-dry Cuyama River. It is about 30 miles (48 km) southeast of Cuyama, which is in the western Cuyama Valley.

The name Ventucopa is a portmanteau of the cities of Ventura and Maricopa, which are located along Highway 33 to the south and north, respectively.

=== Access ===
Because of how the county borders were drawn in relation to the valley and the Cuyama River, the community is isolated from the rest of Santa Barbara County via ground transportation. Travel to other communities within the county requires crossing through either Ventura County to the south, via the southern Maricopa Highway section of State Route 33, then State Route 150 from Ojai to Carpinteria; or San Luis Obispo County to the north, via the western Cuyama Highway (State Route 166), which joins US 101 at Santa Maria. Access from the San Joaquin Valley and Interstate 5 to the north in Kern County is via the eastern Maricopa Highway section of State Route 166.

== See also ==
- Cuyama Valley topics
