= Thomas Dibblee =

American geologist

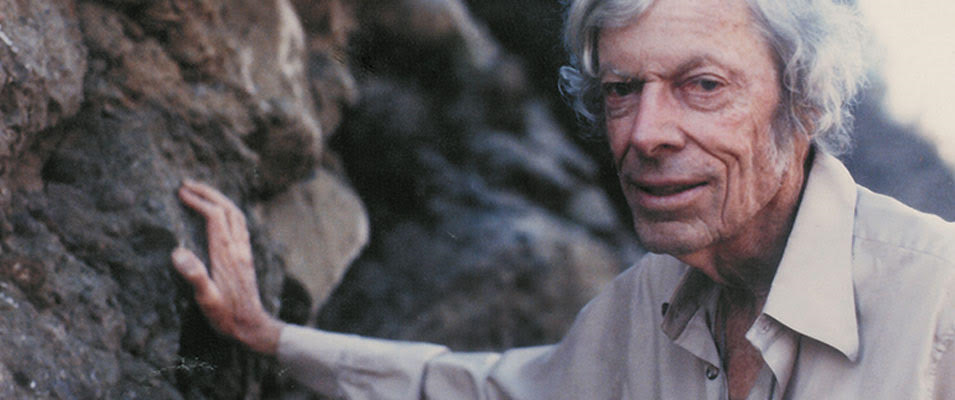
- Born: 11 October 1911; Santa Barbara
- Died: 17 November 2004; Santa Barbara
- Education: Stanford University
- Occupations: Geologist, geological cartographer, cartographer
- Employer: United States Geological Survey (–1977)

Thomas Wilson Dibblee, Jr. (11 October 1911 in Santa Barbara, California – 17 November 2004 in Santa Barbara, California) was an American geologist best known for his geological mapping. He is also known, together with co-author Mason Hill, for the assertion in 1953 that hundreds of miles of lateral movement had taken place along the San Andreas Fault in California, an idea that was radical at the time, but which has been vindicated by later work and the modern theory of plate tectonics. Dibblee was one of the most prolific field geologists in American history, and over a 60-year career of field mapping, including 25 years with the US Geological Survey, left a legacy of 40,000 square miles (100,000 km^{2}) of geologic maps, covering approximately one fourth of the state of California.

== Biography ==
Dibblee was born in 1911, the eldest son of Thomas Dibblee Sr. and Anita Oreña Dibblee. His earliest California ancestor was Captain José de la Guerra y Noriega, the Comandante of the Presidio of Santa Barbara. Dibblee grew up on Rancho San Julian, one of the Dibblee - de la Guerra family ranches. He became interested in geology as a boy, when he assisted a geologist who surveyed the family ranch for oil-bearing structures.

=== Petroleum geologist ===
After graduating from Stanford University in 1936, Dibblee worked briefly for the California Division of Mines, then went to work for Union Oil Company and then Richfield Oil as a field exploration petroleum geologist. His field mapping led to the discovery of the Russell Ranch Oil Field, the first oil field to be found in the Cuyama Valley in 1948, and then to the nearby larger South Cuyama Oil Field in 1949.

Dibblee was known for "roughing it" during his field mapping trips, for which he dropped out of sight for a week or two at a time. Some of colleagues report that during these trips, he would sleep in his car and take little more than a couple of loaves of bread and a jar of peanut butter. When he submitted one expense account totaling $14.92 for one such mapping project, his Richfield Oil supervisor objected that he couldn't have even fed himself for that amount, to which Dibblee replied: "Oh, I find lots of things I like to eat up in the hills."

=== US Geological Survey ===
He joined the US Geological Survey in 1952, and was assigned to geologic mapping in the Mojave Desert. In 1953 he and co-worker Mason Hill published a paper proposing 350 miles (560 km) of lateral movement along the San Andreas Fault. At that time, prior to plate tectonics theory, there was no known mechanism that could cause such large-scale movements.

=== Los Padres National Forest ===
Dibblee retired from the USGS in 1977, and the following year began mapping the geology of Los Padres National Forest as a volunteer. Although he was "retired," he mapped the geology of more than 3,000 square miles (7,800 km^{2}) in the national forest.

== Family ==
In 1949 Dibblee married Loretta Escabosa, whom he met when she was a secretary at Richfield Oil. They had a long marriage, with no children. Loretta died in 2001. In 2004, Dibblee died in Santa Barbara. He was 93 years old.

== Awards ==
- US Geological Survey - Distinguished Service Award, 1967
- American Association of Petroleum Geologists - Human Needs Award, 1981
- Presidential Volunteer Action Award, 1983

== Dibblee Geological Foundation ==
The Dibblee Geological Foundation was established to publish Dibblee's many unpublished geological maps. In 2002 the foundation was adopted by the Santa Barbara Museum of Natural History. The foundation continues to publish maps based on Dibblee's work.

== Published works ==
- (with Mason L. Hill) “San Andreas, Garlock, and Big Pine faults, California,” Geological Society of America Bulletin, April 1953, p. 443-458. This is considered a classic publication in the history of plate tectonics theory.
