= Santa Maria Town Center =

- Location: Santa Maria, California, United States
- Coordinates: 34.9515°N 120.4352°W
- Opened: 1976
- Developer: The Hahn Company
- Owner: Spinoso Real Estate Group
- Architect: Burke, Kober, Nicolais, Archuleta
- Num. of stores: 69
- Num. of anchor tenants: 3 (2 open, 1 under construction)
- Floor area: 600,000 sq ft (56,000 m^{2})
- Floors: 2
- Parking: 3 levels, 3,315 spaces
- Website: santamariatowncenter.com

Santa Maria Town Center (also referred to as Town Center Mall) is an indoor shopping center located in Santa Maria, California. It is located on the junctions of Routes 135 (Broadway) and 166 (Main Street), and Cook Street and Miller Street. Anchored by Macy's, Edwards Theatres, and El Super Market, Santa Maria Town Center is the only enclosed shopping center in Santa Barbara County, and is the largest in the Central Coast, totaling about 600,000 square feet (56,000 m^{2}) in area. It is home to a mix of 69 stores and eateries totaling approximately 25 acres (10 ha) of retail space, and features national retailers like Kay Jewelers, Bath & Body Works, Foot Locker, and GNC. The Town Center also features two three-level parking garages with 3,315 total parking spaces.

== History ==
The Town Center Mall opened in 1976, with Gottschalks and Sears as its original anchors. It also featured a three-screen United Artists cinema, which was sold in 1996 to Wallace Theater Corporation and operated as a discount cinema until its eventual closure in 2001. The mall was expanded in 1990 to include May Company California (later Robinsons-May, now Macy's) as a new anchor store. From the 1990s until the early 2000s, the mall featured a large, hand-carved, indoor carousel, which has since been listed for sale.

Several tenants in the Town Center Mall closed during the 2007-9 Great Recession, including Gottschalks, which declared bankruptcy in 2009. In July 2010, the mall's owners defaulted on a $32 million loan. Negotiations prevented the mall from going into receivership.

From December 10, 2010 to January 9, 2011, the Town Center Mall was home to an outdoor ice skating rink, just outside the former Gottschalks building. It was the first time such a venue was hosted in Santa Maria.

The Town Center Mall was sold to Spinoso Real Estate Group in October 2012, who began renovations on the former Gottschalks wing. The old Gottschalks location was demolished in 2013 and rebuilt as a Regal Cinemas. Renovations focused mainly on family entertainment venues, including a new soccer training facility, a gymnastics center, and a baseball and softball center, as well as improvements to the existing skateboarding park.

In 2015, Sears Holdings spun off 235 of its properties, including the Sears at Santa Maria Town Center, into Seritage Growth Properties.

In September 2018, the Town Center Mall was sold to an undisclosed global insurance company for $21.5 million. The remaining anchor stores and the parking garages were not part of the transaction. The company plans to add new tenants and venues to the shopping center.

On November 7, 2019, Transformco announced it would be closing 51 Sears stores nationwide, which included its Town Center location. The store closed on February 2, 2020, after 44 years of operation.

In March 2020, the Town Center Mall temporarily closed due to the COVID-19 pandemic after Governor Gavin Newsom ordered the shutdown of all nonessential business. The Town Center was restricted to curbside pickup and outdoor operations only, until it reopened in limited capacity in September of that year. The Town Center was fully reopened by May 2021.

In May of 2025, the Santa Maria City Council approved a project to renovate and repurpose the former Sears building into an El Super Market and other businesses. Construction is currently ongoing at the former Sears. El Super Market is expected to open in 2026 on the lower floor of the former Sears with the upper floor being rebuilt into additional retail space.
