= Russell Ranch Oil Field =

Oil Field in Southern California

Coordinates: 34.9904°N 119.8055°W

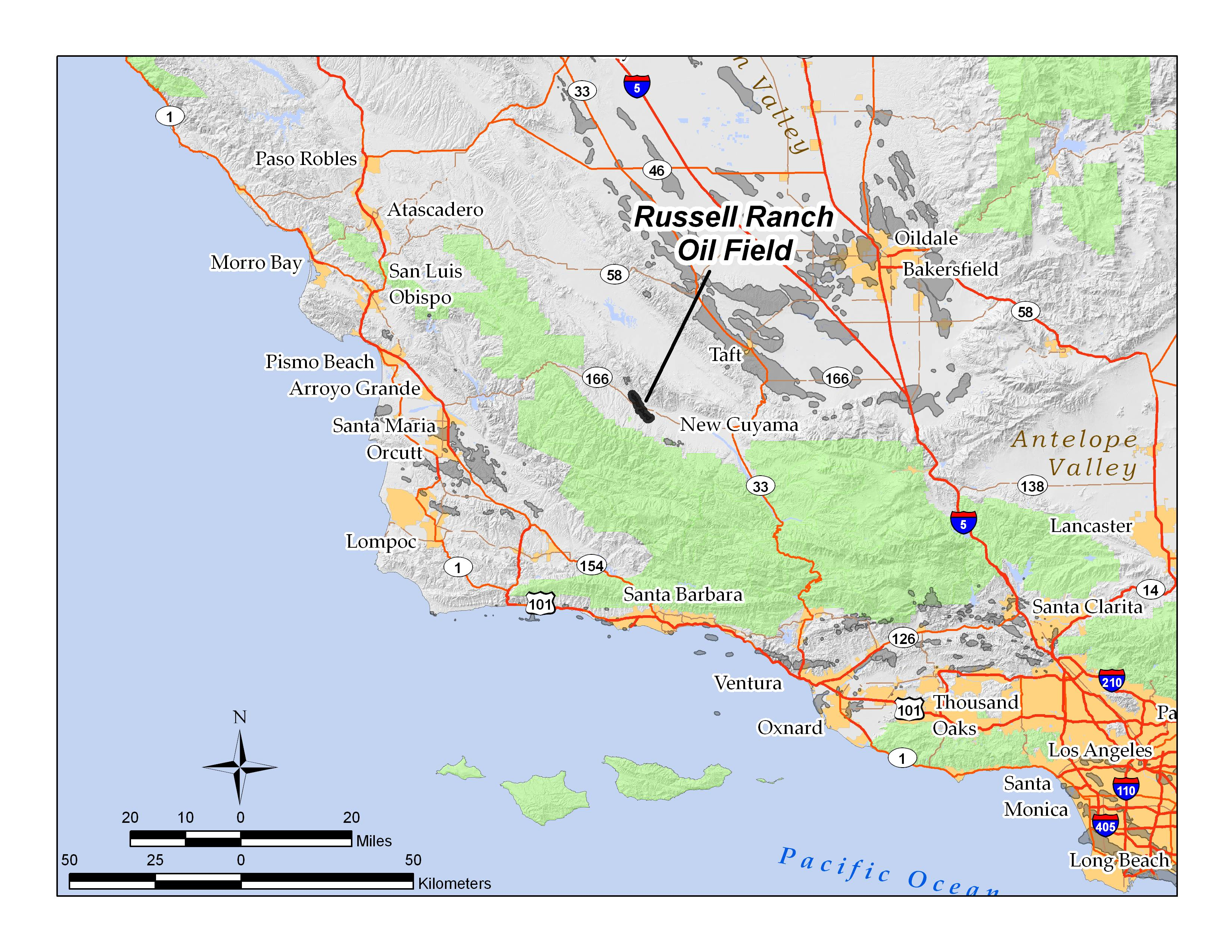
- The Russell Ranch Oil Field in central and southern California. Other oil fields are shown in dark gray.
- Country: United States
- Region: Cuyama Valley
- Location: Santa Barbara and San Luis Obispo County, California
- Offshore/onshore: onshore
- Operator: E&B Natural Resources

Field history
- Discovery: 1948
- Start of development: 1948
- Start of production: 1948
- Peak year: 1950

Production
- Current production of oil: 113.4 barrels per day (~5,651 t/a)
- Estimated oil in place: 0.216 million barrels (~29,500 t)
- Producing formations: Santa Margarita Formation (late Miocene); Vaqueros Sandstone (early Miocene)

The Russell Ranch Oil Field is an oil and gas field in the Cuyama Valley of northern Santa Barbara and southern San Luis Obispo Counties, California, in the United States. Discovered in 1948, and reaching peak production in 1950, it has produced over 68 million barrels (10,800,000 m^{3}) of oil in its lifetime; with only an estimated 216,000 barrels (34,300 m^{3}) of recoverable oil remaining, and having produced around 66,000 in 2008, it is considered to be close to exhaustion. The primary operator on the field as of 2010 is E&B Natural Resources, which also runs the nearby South Cuyama Oil Field.

== Setting ==
The oil field one of the two significant fields in the Cuyama Valley, the other being the much larger South Cuyama Oil Field. The Russell Ranch field is about seven miles (11 km) west-northwest of the town of New Cuyama. The total productive area is about 1,540 acres (6.2 km^{2}), and the field is about five miles (8.0 km) long by one-half mile (0.80 km) across, with the long axis trending approximately northwest to southeast, beginning at Whiterock Bluff in the Caliente Range, crossing under the Cuyama River, and ending in the foothills of the Sierra Madre Mountains. The Cuyama River, and California State Route 166 which parallels the river, cut through the center of the field; travelers on Route 166 have a brief view of oil storage tanks and several pumpjacks, but most of the oilfield operations are out of sight from the public right-of-way.

Elevations on the field range from around 1,750 feet (530 m) where the river cuts across the field, to around 2,200 feet (670 m) at the southern end in the hills. Terrain consists of an alluvial plain around the river, and grass- and brush-covered hills, cut by numerous gullies and badlands, at both ends of the field in the lower portion of the Caliente and Sierra Madre mountains. Climate is Mediterranean, but modified by the distance from the coast; winters are colder, with occasional freezes, and summertime temperatures sometimes top 100 °F (38 °C). Drainage is to the Cuyama River, which flows out to the ocean at Guadalupe. In the vicinity of the oil field, the predominant land use, aside from activities associated with oil production and storage, is cattle grazing. The bottomlands of the Cuyama Valley, adjacent to the field on the east-southeast, are primarily agricultural.

== Geology ==
Unlike many oil fields in central California, the Russell Ranch field is not an anticlinal formation with an obvious surface expression – indeed the geologic formation containing oil is quite invisible from the ground surface, being covered with alluvium and masked by the mountain ranges running almost perpendicular to the oil field. The oil is in a large homocline, including porous sedimentary units dipping northeast and essentially planar, which terminate at the Russell Fault, a normal fault with an approximately 1,000-foot (300 m) vertical offset which has barricaded upwards movement of hydrocarbons against impermeable rock of Pliocene age. The oil-bearing rocks in the homocline — the Santa Margarita and Vaqueros Formations, of late and early Miocene age respectively — are sandstones with a porosity of between 23 and 32 percent.

The oil field has four separate pools or producing horizons within its main area, and one small pool in another area about one-half mile southeast of the main part of the field. The four pools in the main area, all discovered in 1948 and 1949, are the Santa Margarita, in the formation of the same name, of late Miocene age; and the Dibblee, Griggs-Dibblee, and Colgrove, all in the Vaqueros Formation of early Miocene age. The pool in the Southeast Area is also in the Dibblee Sand of the Vaqueros Formation. Depths of the pools range from 2,500 feet (760 m) below ground surface in the Santa Margarita to 3,600 in the Dibblee Sand in the Southeast area, and oil is of medium grade, with API gravity ranging from 25 to 40. Sulfur content is generally low, with values from 0.26 to 0.46 percent in each of the pools.

== History, production, and operations ==
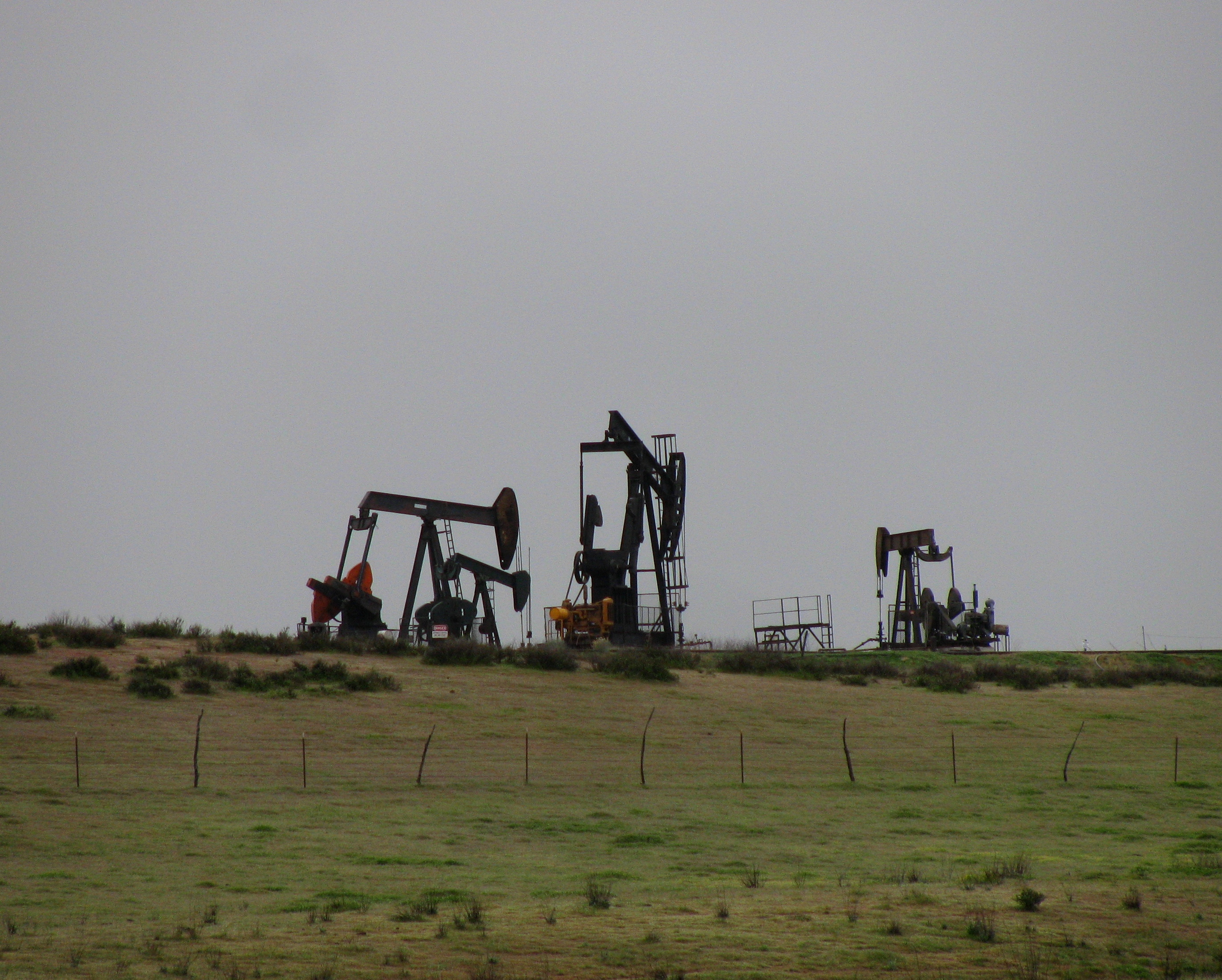
Cluster of active oil wells in the Russell Ranch field, south of SR 166.

The Russell Ranch field was the first to be found in the Cuyama Valley. Prospectors had long suspected the presence of oil there – after all, almost all the surrounding basins were full of oil fields, which only needed to be found by drilling deep enough – but early boreholes found nothing of commercial value. A well drilled in the 1920s near the western edge of the field found nothing, and wells drilled in 1945–6 found traces of oil sands, a promising sign. Norris Oil Company put in the discovery well on January 1, 1948, which produced 190 barrels per day (30 m^{3}/d); unfortunately the production turned to water quickly, and prospectors began looking for a more favorable location. Richfield Oil Company, an ancestor of ARCO (now BP), put in the well which found the most productive area of the field, drilling to a depth of 4,218 feet (1,286 m) into the Dibblee Sand (named for Thomas Dibblee, the geologist who led Richfield to explore for oil in the Cuyama Valley). This well produced over 350 barrels per day (56 m^{3}/d), and many more wells followed; each of the producing horizons had been discovered before 1950, and by July 1, 1950, there were 142 producing wells on the field. The success of the Russell Ranch field development led quickly to the discovery of the South Cuyama field about seven miles (11 km) to the southeast, in 1949; this field proved to have over three times the oil of the Russell Ranch field, and remains the largest in the Cuyama Valley.

The field reached its peak production in 1950, when 7.9 million barrels (1,260,000 m^{3}) of oil were withdrawn from the reservoir. Inevitably, production declined, and field operators employed several enhanced recovery technologies to increase reservoir pressure and keep the wells flowing. Waterflooding was begun in 1953, and air injection in 1971. A cyclic steam program ran from 1966 to 1968 but failed to produce any significant benefit.

The field changed hands several times, with West America Resources and J.P. Oil among the owners prior to the purchase by E&B Natural Resources from J.P. Oil in 2003. E&B, the current operator, reported pumping 66,621 barrels (10,591.9 m^{3}) of oil in 2008; its wells were averaging only 4.1 barrels per day (0.65 m^{3}/d), a figure typical of a field near the end of its useful life. At the end of 2008, there were 44 wells still active on the field, all operated by E&B. All but one of these wells was in the Main Area; the other was the solitary well still producing in the Southeast Area.

The Bureau of Land Management (BLM) approved an oil well and pipeline project within the Carrizo Plain National Monument in 2018, but withdrew it after Los Padres ForestWatch and the Center for Biological Diversity filed objections citing the potential for oil spills, air pollution and harm to wildlife, among other environmental concerns. The BLM approved the project in 2020 after their analysis showed that the new well posed no undue health or safety concerns, had no significant impacts to the environment and was consistent with management directives for the monument. An agreement was reached in 2022 over a lawsuit against the BLM filed by the conservation groups in 2020. The BLM issued an order to E&B to permanently close and remove 11 long-dormant oil wells, return the oil pads and more than 3 miles (4.8 km) of access roads to natural conditions, as well as removing pipelines, powerlines and other infrastructure from within the monument.
