= CA-135 =

CA-135 may refer to:

- California State Route 135, a highway in the US state of California
- Caproni Ca.135, an experimental aircraft
- Cluster of differentiation antigen 135, a protein
