= Cuyama Valley =

Valley along the Cuyama river in California

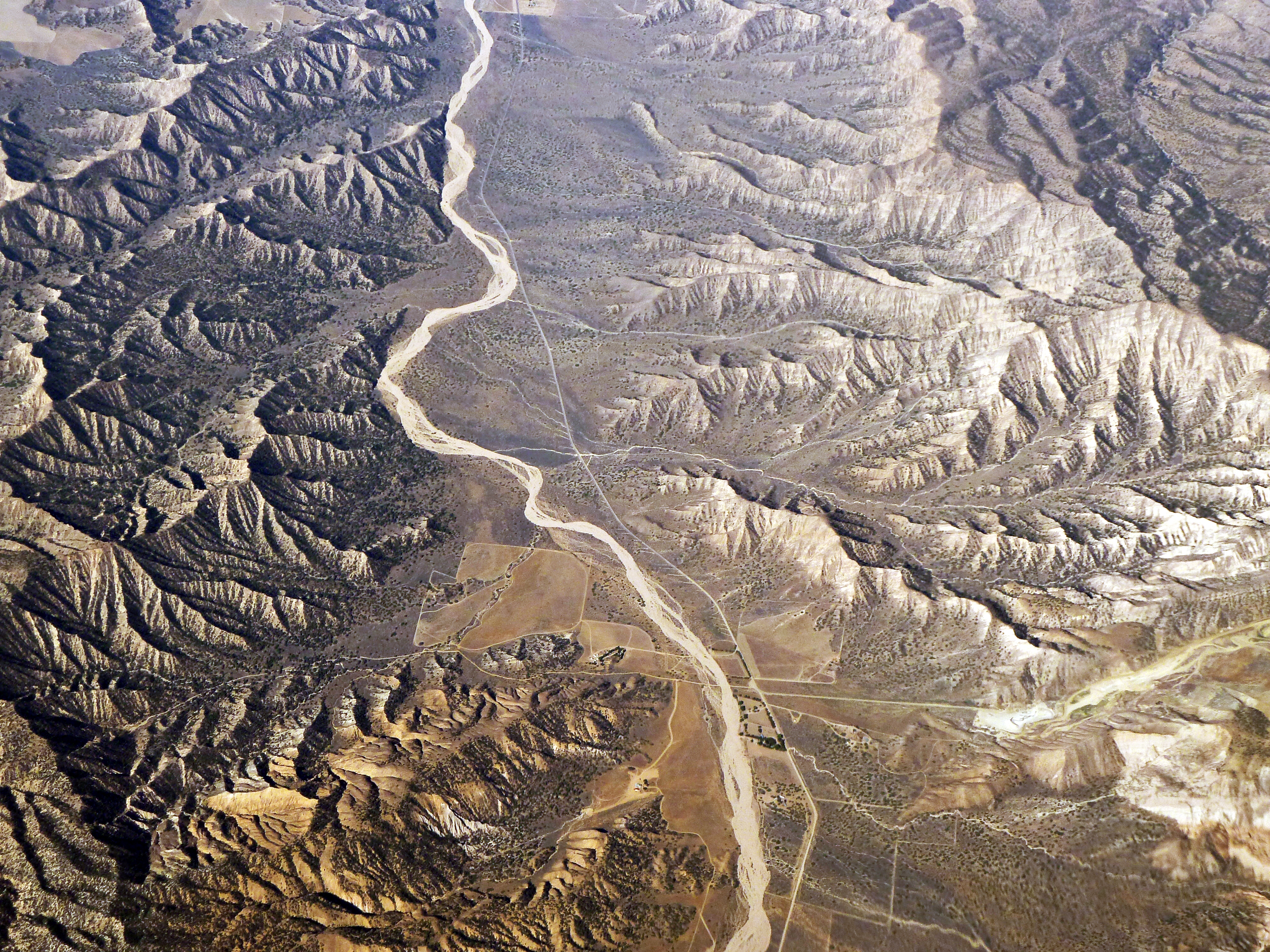
- Rugged terrain surrounding the Cuyama Valley

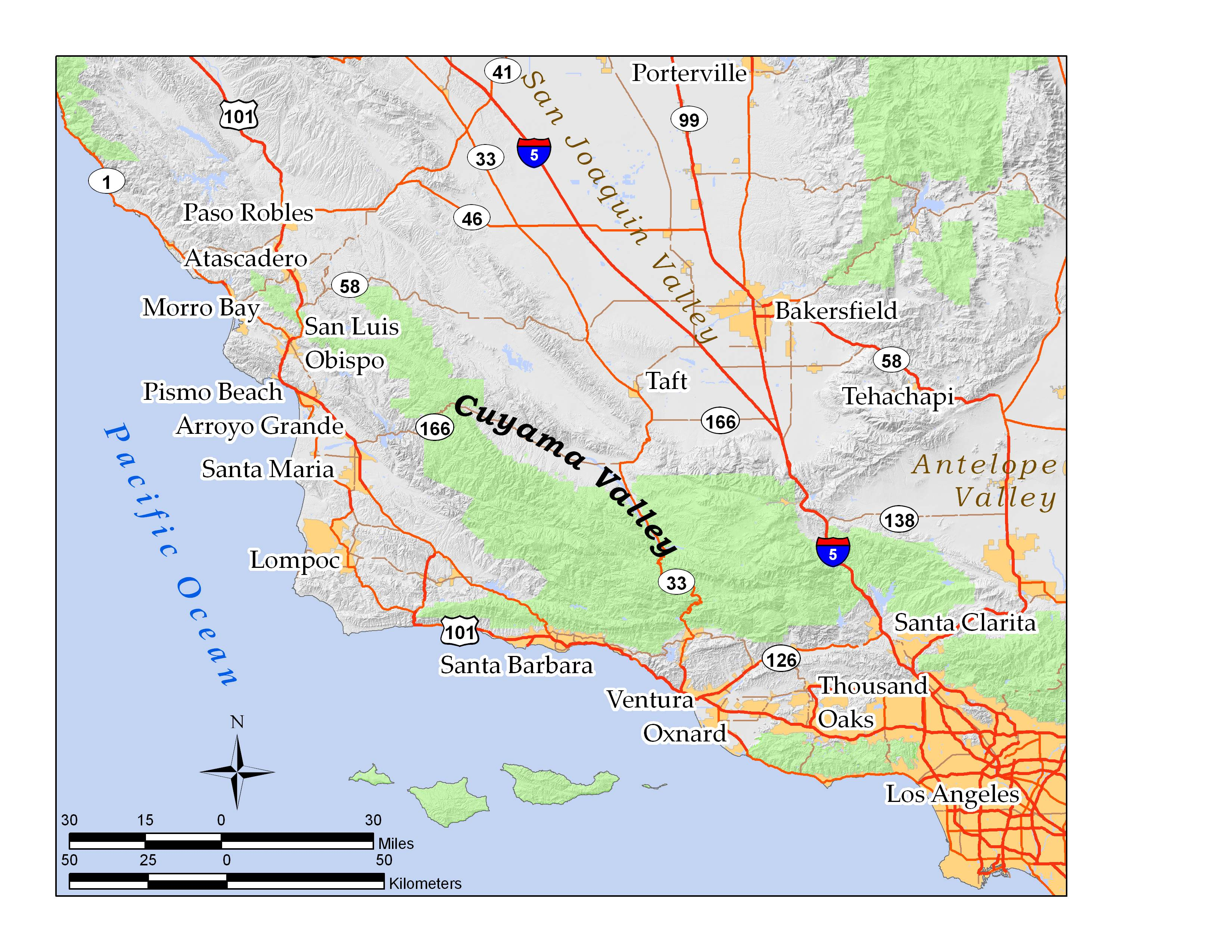
- Location of the Cuyama Valley in southern and central California: green areas are national forests and national parks
- Area: 300 square miles (780 km^{2})

Geography
- Location: California, United States
- Population centers: Cuyama, New Cuyama, Ventucopa
- Coordinates: 34.9295°N 119.5971°W
- Traversed by: State Route 166, State Route 33
- Rivers: Cuyama River

The Cuyama Valley (Chumash: Kuyam, meaning "Clam") is a valley along the Cuyama River in Central California, spanning northern Santa Barbara County, southern San Luis Obispo County, southwestern Kern County, and northwestern Ventura counties. It is about a two hour drive from either Los Angeles or the Santa Barbara area.

The Cuyama Valley is sparsely inhabited, containing the unincorporated settlements of Cuyama, New Cuyama, and Ventucopa. The land is largely used for ranching, agriculture, and oil and gas production. California State Route 166 runs along most of the east/west length of the valley, connecting Kern County and the southern San Joaquin Valley with Santa Maria and coastal Santa Barbara and San Luis Obispo Counties. State Route 33 runs north/south through the eastern end of the valley, connecting the southern San Joaquin Valley to Ojai and coastal Ventura County.

The valley is home to the 40 MW Cuyama Solar Project, the largest photovoltaic power station in Santa Barbara County.

== Geography ==
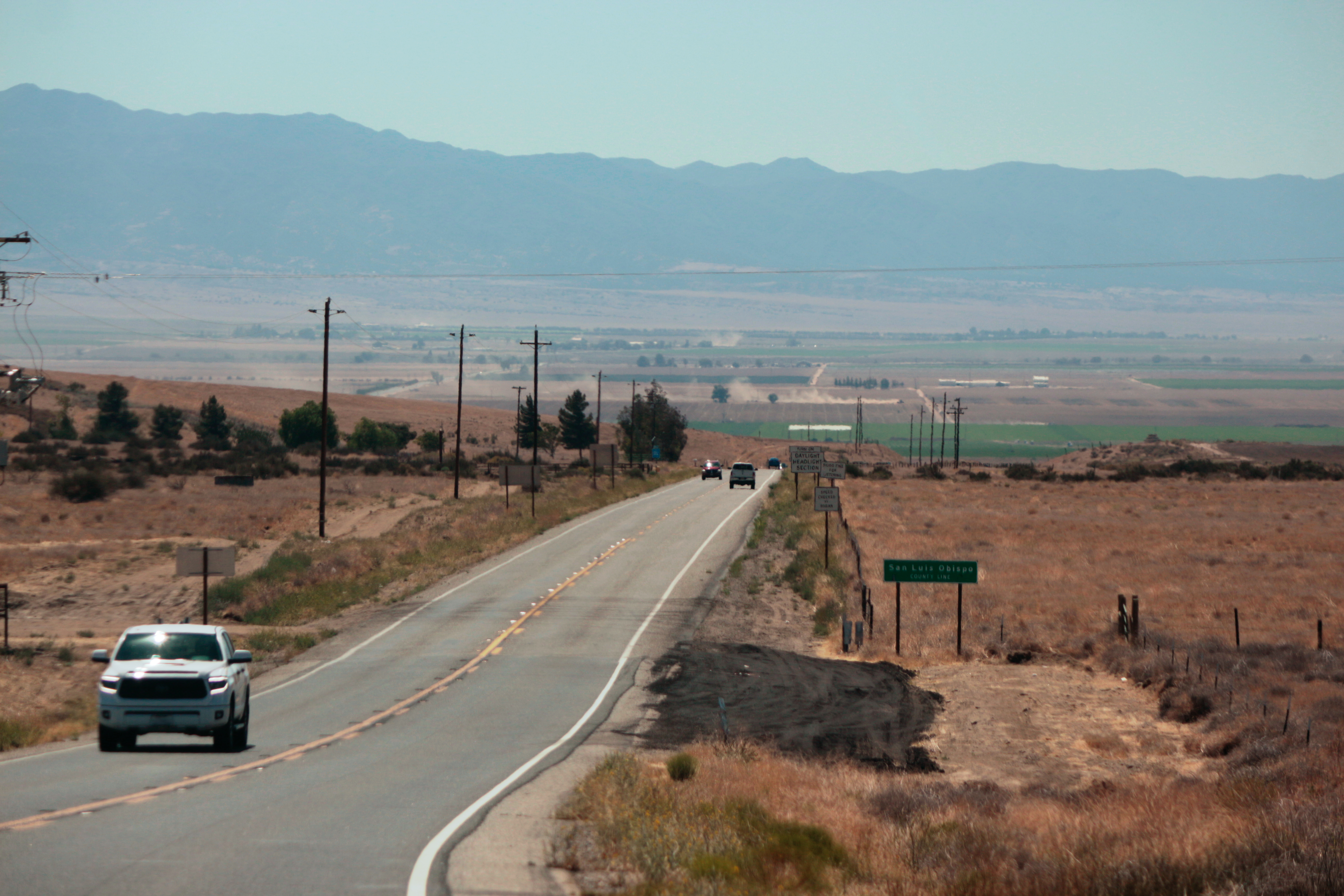
Cuyama seen from the east, on SR-166

The valley encompasses an area of approximately 300 square miles (780 km^{2}). It is bounded on all sides by mountains: the Sierra Madre Mountains along the south and west, the La Panza Range on the north, and the Caliente Range along the northeast − all of the California Coast Ranges System; and the San Emigdio Mountains on the east − of the Transverse Ranges System.

The headwaters of the Cuyama River are just north of Pine Mountain Summit on State Route 33. The valley widens from the river's entry to a maximum width near the highway junction of Routes 166 and 33, near the corner of the four counties. Then it narrows again as the river flows west out of the valley through a narrow canyon between the Sierra Madre and La Panza ranges, to the Santa Maria Valley and its river mouth on the Pacific Ocean.

The agricultural fields are in the center of the valley, near the Cuyama Highway junction and the two primary towns, where the alluvium is rich and the valley is a wide floodplain.

Rising to the north above the major portion of the valley is the Caliente Range, north of which is the Carrizo Plain, a much larger inland valley. To the southeast is the high backcountry of Ventura County, which includes the highest summit in the region, Mount Pinos, and other features of the San Emigdio Mountains. The far eastern end of the valley is crossed by the San Andreas Fault, forming a low jumble of hills which Route 166 passes over to reach the southwestern San Joaquin Valley, with access to Maricopa, I−5, and Bakersfield.

The Los Padres National Forest lands are adjacent to the Cuyama Valley on its south, east, and northwest sides. Much of the land to the northeast, including most of the Caliente Range, is managed by the U.S. Bureau of Land Management (BLM).

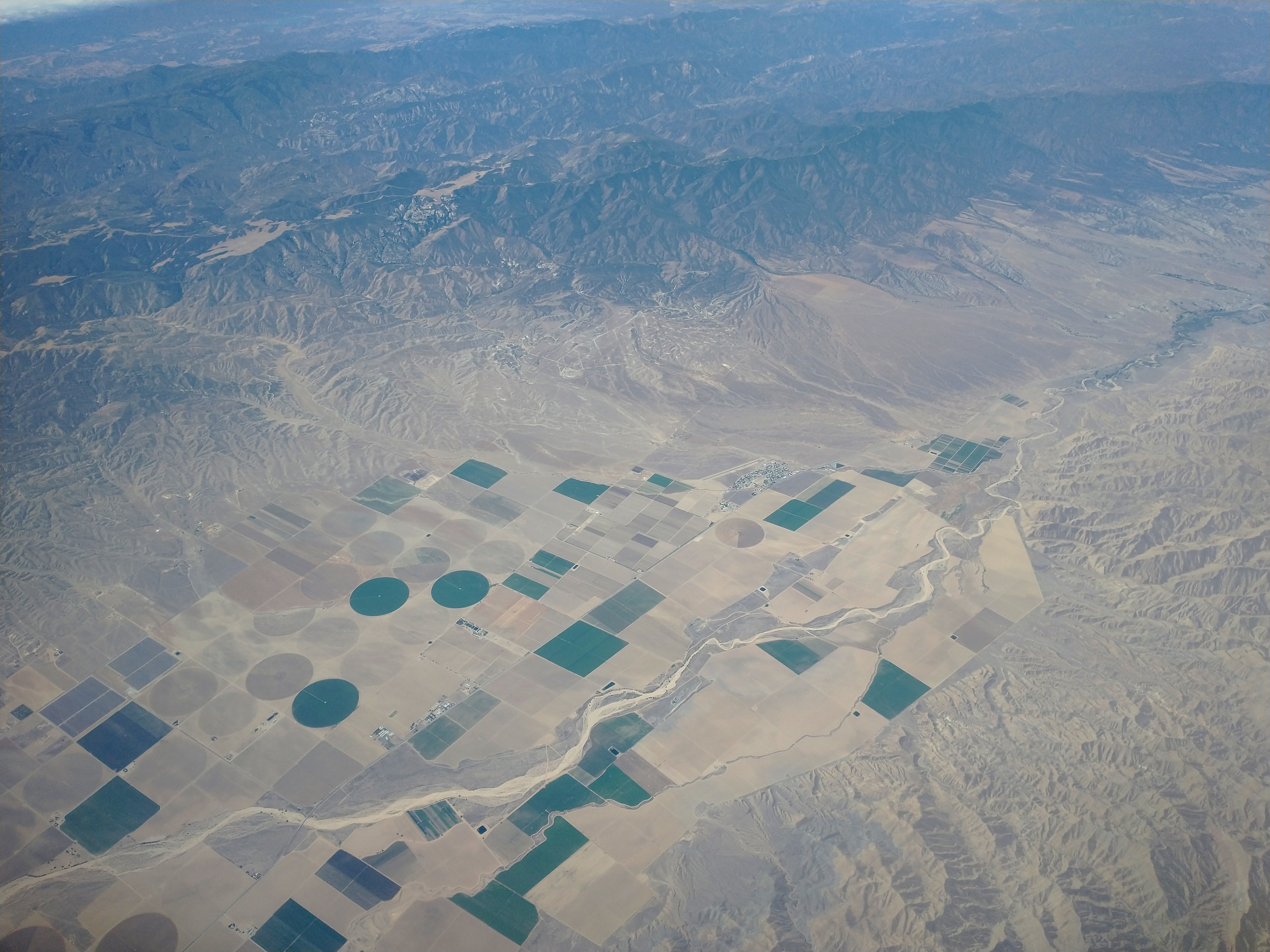
Cuyama, California aerial view showing farms and oil/gas field

=== Geology ===
The valley is an alluvium-filled synclinal basin, at an elevation of approximately 2,000 to 2,500 feet (600 to 800 meters). Most of the rocks are sedimentary, and the Miocene-age Monterey Formation outcrops to the south, in the foothills of the Sierra Madre. Pliocene and Pleistocene sedimentary formations occur in the foothills along the south side of the valley as well. The large Morales Thrust Fault separates the abruptly-rising block of the Caliente Range from the valley itself on the north. Scenic badlands occur in the upper reaches of the valley, north and northeast of Pine Mountain Summit; they are reachable from Route 33 via Lockwood Valley Road.

=== Climate ===
The climate of the valley is semi-arid with hot summers and cool winters. Almost all precipitation occurs in the winter in the form of rain, although snow has fallen on occasion; only five inches of rain falls annually on the valley floor. Since the valley is open to the sea, there is occasional marine influence. The principal native vegetation on the valley floor is grassland and scrub, with chaparral and oak woodland in the hills to the south.

== History ==
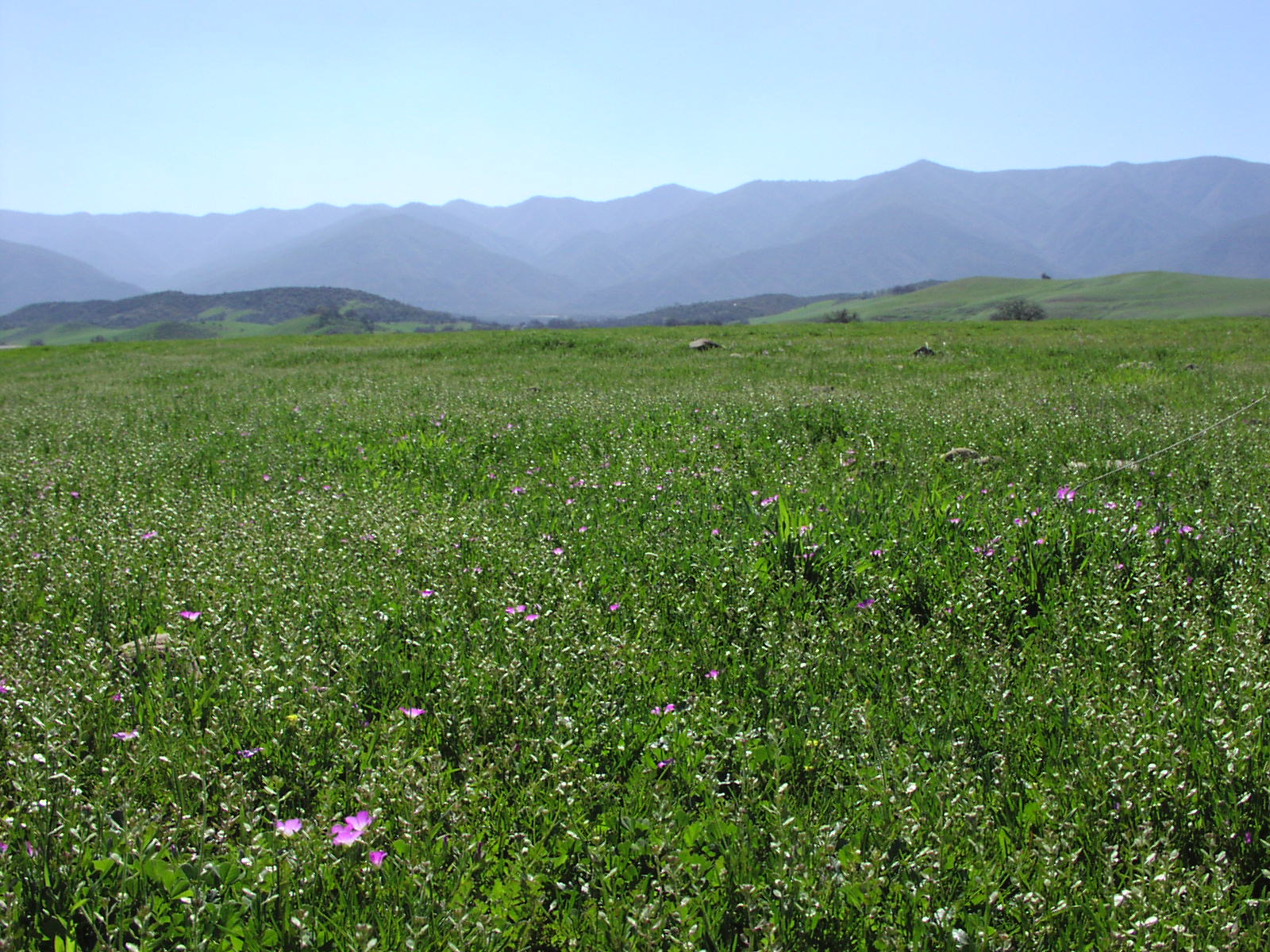
Looking south in the Cuyama Valley towards the Sierra Madre Mountains

The native inhabitants of the valley are Chumash. The name "Cuyama" comes from a village named for the Chumash word kuyam, meaning "clam" or "freshwater mollusk". In addition to kuyam, other Chumash communities in the Cuyama Valley included Sxaliwilimu’, Lishawato’w, and Tsiwikon. Although the Spanish arrived in 1769 in California, the Cuyama Valley Chumash had little interaction with the Spanish until 1801. Between 1801 and 1822, over 400 people from the Cuyama Valley were baptized into Spanish missions. Over half went to Mission La Purisima, while most of the others were incorporated into Mission San Luis Obispo, Mission Santa Ines, and Mission Santa Barbara—all Chumash missions. Pacomio was a Cuyama Valley man baptized into Mission La Purisima in 1803. The decade 1811 to 1822 was a period when Spain ceased to subsidize missions. This put pressure on native Christians to produce more and to pay a tax to sustain the suddenly unpaid military. As a result, Cuyama Valley people made a transition to mission life at a tense time. In 1824, Pacomio was a leader in the multi-mission Chumash uprising. In 1825, newly independent Mexico sent a governor to California who liberated accomplished craftsmen from mission life. Pacomio became a free carpenter in Monterey, the Mexican capital of California, where he served on the town council. He died in 1844 of smallpox.

Near the end of the Mexican period of Alta California, the valley was split into two land grants along the Cuyama River, the 22,193 acres (8,981 ha) Rancho Cuyama de Rojo in 1843, and the 48,827 acres (19,760 ha) Rancho Cuyama de Lataillade) in 1846. The main land use in the second half of the 19th century was cattle grazing, although some homesteading took place in the latter part, especially in the side canyons where water availability was greater. In 1939, the first successful water wells utilizing a pumping system were drilled. The groundwater aquifer is deep below the Cuyama Valley and this new availability of irrigation water introduced agricultural crops into the region, though cattle grazing continuing.

Little further economic development took place in the Cuyama Valley until the discovery of oil in 1948 at the Russell Ranch Oil Field, and more significantly in 1949 at the much larger South Cuyama Oil Field. Richfield Oil Company, later part of ARCO, built the town of New Cuyama to house the oil workers and their associated services. They shipped the oil pumped from these two fields by pipeline to their refinery near Long Beach. For a brief time in the early 1950s, the Cuyama Valley was the fourth-most productive oil region of California.

As oil production declined − only about two percent of the South Cuyama Field's oil is estimated to remain − the main economic activity in the valley again became agriculture.

The groundwater levels have been declining (part of a statewide trend) due to large amounts of water being pumped for large scale farming. In May 2024, the Santa Barbara Botanic Garden received $818,000 from the U.S. Department of Agriculture to start a farmland-restoration project in the valley to attempt to revert the water scarcity.

== See also ==
- Ranchos of Santa Barbara County, California
- Valleys of California
