= South Cuyama Oil Field =

Oil and gas field in Santa Barbara County, California

Coordinates: 34.8977°N 119.7055°W

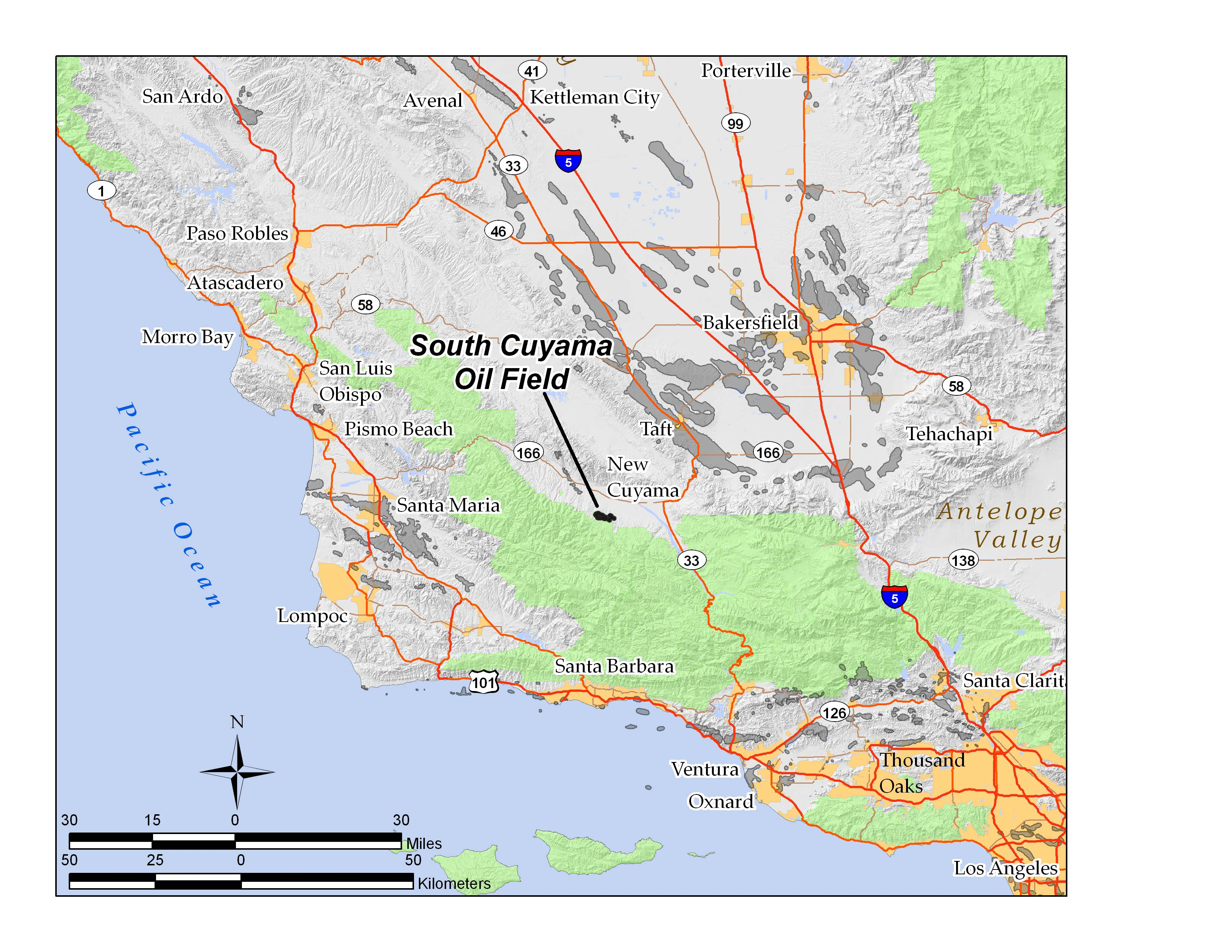
The South Cuyama Oil Field in Santa Barbara County, California. Other oil fields are shown in gray.

The South Cuyama Oil Field is a large oil and gas field in the Cuyama Valley and the adjacent northern foothills of the Sierra Madre Mountains in northeastern Santa Barbara County, California. Discovered in 1949, and with a cumulative production of around 225 million barrels (35,800,000 m^{3}) of oil, it ranks 27th in size in the state, but is believed to retain only approximately two percent of its original oil (approximately 4.6 million barrels (730,000 m^{3})), according to the official estimates of the California Department of Oil, Gas, and Geothermal Resources (DOGGR). Of the top forty onshore oil fields in California, it is the most recent to be discovered, but by the end of 2008 only 87 wells remained in production.

== Setting ==
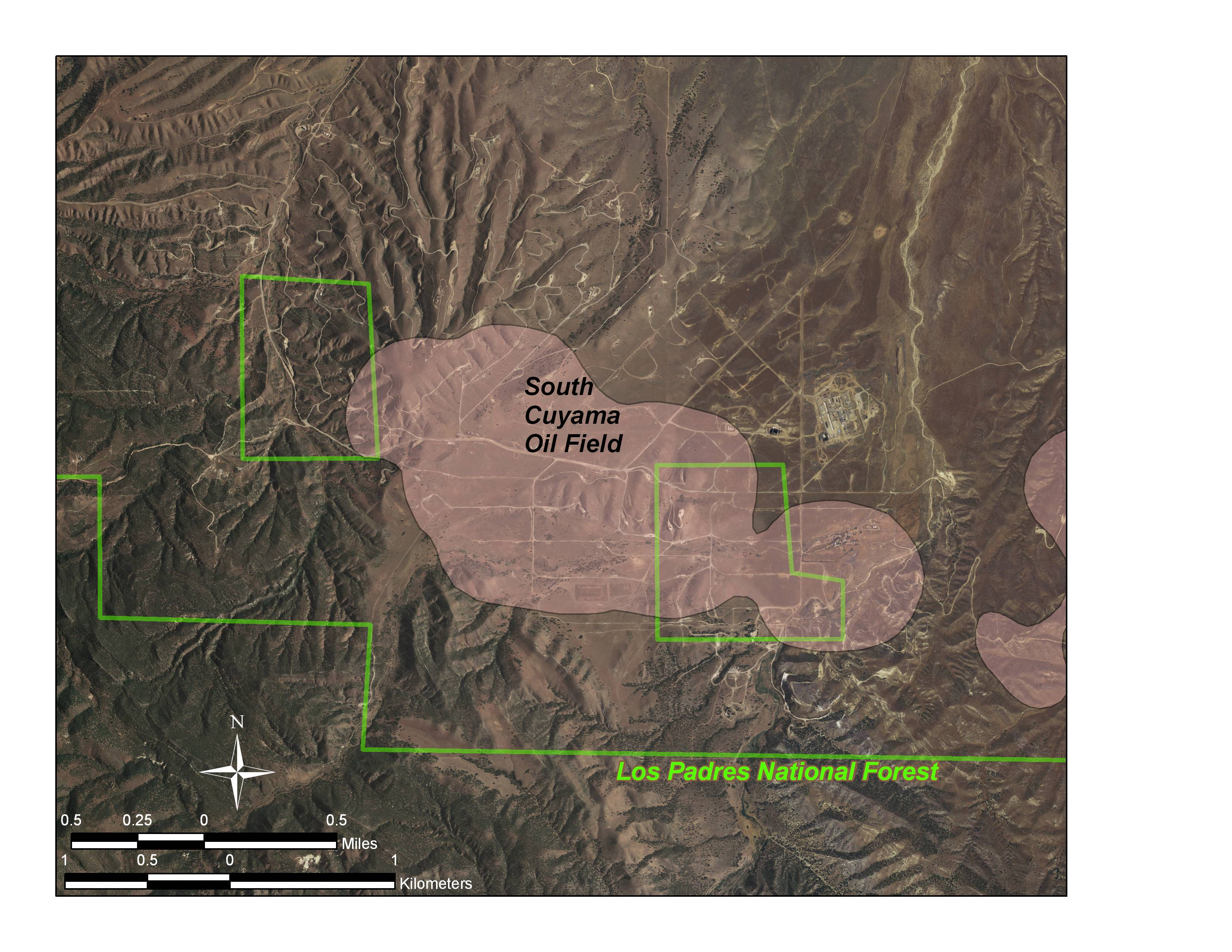
South Cuyama Oil Field, on a 2005 aerial photograph base. Los Padres National Forest lands are indicated by green polygons; the light-shaded area is the rough extent of the productive area of the oil field, although wells have been drilled outside of it, especially to the north and northwest. The town of New Cuyama is just off the map to the northeast, and the crest of the Sierra Madre Mountains is off the map to the south.

The oil field is south of the town of New Cuyama in the portion of the Cuyama Valley that slopes gently into the northern foothills of the Sierra Madre Mountains. Parts of the field are on hilly terrain, and some is within the Los Padres National Forest. The field can be reached from California State Route 166 via Aliso Canyon Road on the northwest, and Perkins Road on the northeast; Perkins Road joins 166 at the town of New Cuyama. While these roads run roughly north-south, Foothill Road crosses through the field from east to west, eventually reaching Santa Barbara Canyon Road on the east and State Route 33. Elevations on the field range from approximately 2,200 to 3,000 feet (670 to 910 meters). The productive area of the field is approximately 4 miles (6.4 km) long by two across, with the long axis running northwest to southeast; the total productive area as reported by DOGGR is 2,650 acres (10.7 km^{2}).

The climate is semi-arid, with occasional marine influence, as the Cuyama Valley is open to the sea, although through a narrow gap. Summers are hot with temperatures commonly exceeding 100 °F (38 °C); winters are cool, with the mean freeze-free period being about 250 days. Average annual rainfall is about 12 inches, almost all of it falling in the winter in the form of rain, although occasional snowfall has occurred. All streams are dry in the summer, and even the Cuyama River dries up by the late summer in most years. The area is prone to brushfires in the summer and fall; indeed a fire in 1994 caused a loss of $76,000 to the operators, and in July 2006 an accident on the oil field involving a metal plate crossing power lines started the Perkins Fire, which burned 15,000 acres (61 km^{2}) on the north side of the Sierra Madre Mountains.

Native vegetation in the vicinity of the field ranges from grassland to chaparral to oak woodland. Drainage is to the north, towards the Cuyama River, along Bitter Creek, Branch Canyon Wash, and several ephemeral drainages.

== Geology ==
Oil in the South Cuyama Basin comes from two primary pools, the Miocene-age Dibblee Sand and the Colgrove Sand, porous units in the Vaqueros Formation underneath the largely impermeable Monterey Formation. The sedimentary Cuyama Basin is cut by many small faults, and the oil exists in a series of stratigraphic traps, where it is in most cases blocked in its upward motion by impermeable blocks of Monterey, often offset by faults. The average depth of oil in the field is about 4,200 feet (1,300 m) below ground surface, and the thickness of the oil-bearing units rarely exceeds 200 feet (61 m); in the separate southeastern area of the field, where the Colgrove sand is 5,840 feet (1,780 m) below ground surface, the oil bearing rock is only 50 feet (15 m) thick. The source rock for the South Cuyama oil is most likely the Soda Lake Shale member of the Vaqueros Formation.

Overlying the faulted and broken Miocene rocks, which include the Monterey, Branch Canyon, and Santa Margarita Formations, and separated by an unconformity, is about 2,000 to 2,500 feet (760 m) of the Pliocene Morales Formation. None of these upper rocks are oil-bearing, although gas has been produced from the Santa Margarita Formation.

Oil from the South Cuyama Field is of generally medium to high API gravity, ranging from 28 to 36 API, so it flows easily. A small pool in the Dibblee Sand in the now-abandoned Southeast Area of the field had oil of even higher gravity and lower viscosity; a well drilled there in 1975 was abandoned in 1978 after producing 42,000 barrels (6,700 m^{3}).

== History, production and operations ==
Richfield Oil Co., later part of Atlantic Richfield Company (ARCO), drilled the first well in the area to hit oil, on the advice of Thomas Dibblee, in May 1949. Richfield named the oil-bearing unit, the Dibblee Sand, in his honor. This single well initially produced 525 barrels per day (83.5 m^{3}/d), a large find for a region previously written off as being without petroleum potential. The discovery of oil here and in the nearby Russell Ranch Oil Field transformed the Cuyama Valley from an almost uninhabited region with a few cattle ranches into a mini-boom area; ARCO built the town of New Cuyama in the years after the oil discovery to house the oil workers and provide associated services.

ARCO was only the first of several companies to work the New Cuyama Field. In 1990, they sold off their interest in the field to Stream Energy. The next company to operate the field was Hallador Petroleum, which continued operations until 2005, at which time it sold its interest to E&B Natural Resources Management Corporation, the current operator, which also runs the Russell Ranch field four miles (6 km) to the northwest.

Peak production for the field was in 1951, shortly after discovery, during which over 14 million barrels (2,200,000 m^{3}) of oil were pumped from the Dibblee and Colgrove pools. Production has declined steadily since, with around 820,000 barrels (130,000 m^{3}) pumped in 1977, 500,000 in 1987, 390,000 in 1997, and 270,000 in 2007. At the end of 2008, there were only 87 oil wells still in production.

Some enhanced recovery projects have been undertaken on the field. Since the oil in the South Cuyama Field is not heavy, steam injection has not been necessary to reduce viscosity and improve flow; however, both gas injection and waterflooding have been used, both in the Colgrove and Dibblee formations. The field operators used waterflooding between 1956 and 1973 in the Colgrove, with some success, and both gas injection and waterflooding have been used in the Dibblee Formation commencing in 1964 and 1955, respectively. As of 2008, E&B Resources still uses waterflooding to assist in flow of oil to pumping wells; other wells are designated for water disposal. At the end of 2008, the average water cut – the percentage of liquid pumped from oil wells that was water – was running at 98.4 percent, indicating a field very close to the end of its useful life. Wells on the field were producing an average of 7.9 barrels of oil per day, and the operators have been reinjecting the enormous quantities of water produced with the oil back into the formation through approximately 50 water disposal and water flood wells scattered throughout the field.

E&B also maintains a gas processing plant, known as Gas Plant 10, on the eastern side of the oil field; all natural gas production from the oil wells goes there. The purpose of the gas plant is to strip out hydrogen sulfide, nitrogen, carbon dioxide, water, and natural gas liquids (NGLs) from the gas, making it acceptable for commercial use. After processing at the plant it is sent on for sale, reinjected into the field to enhance recovery, or used as fuel for oilfield operations. NGLs are sent to a tank farm where they are mixed with the oil. Santa Barbara County gave the plant its first permit to operate in 1988.
