= California State Route 135 =

Highway in California

State Route 135

- Map of Santa Barbara County in southern California with SR 135 highlighted in red

Route information
- Maintained by Caltrans
- Length: 21.141 mi (34.023 km) (Does not include overlaps with SR 1 and US 101 Bus.)

Major junctions
- South end: US 101 at Los Alamos
- US 101 Bus. in Santa Maria; SR 166 in Santa Maria
- North end: US 101 / SR 166 in Santa Maria

Location
- Country: United States
- State: California
- Counties: Santa Barbara

Highway system
- State highways in California; Interstate; US; State; Scenic; History; Pre‑1964; Unconstructed; Deleted; Freeways
← SR 134	→ SR 136

State Route 135 (SR 135) is a state highway in the U.S. state of California. It acts as a western bypass of U.S. Route 101 in northern Santa Barbara County that runs through the community of Los Alamos and the center of the city of Santa Maria.

== Route description ==
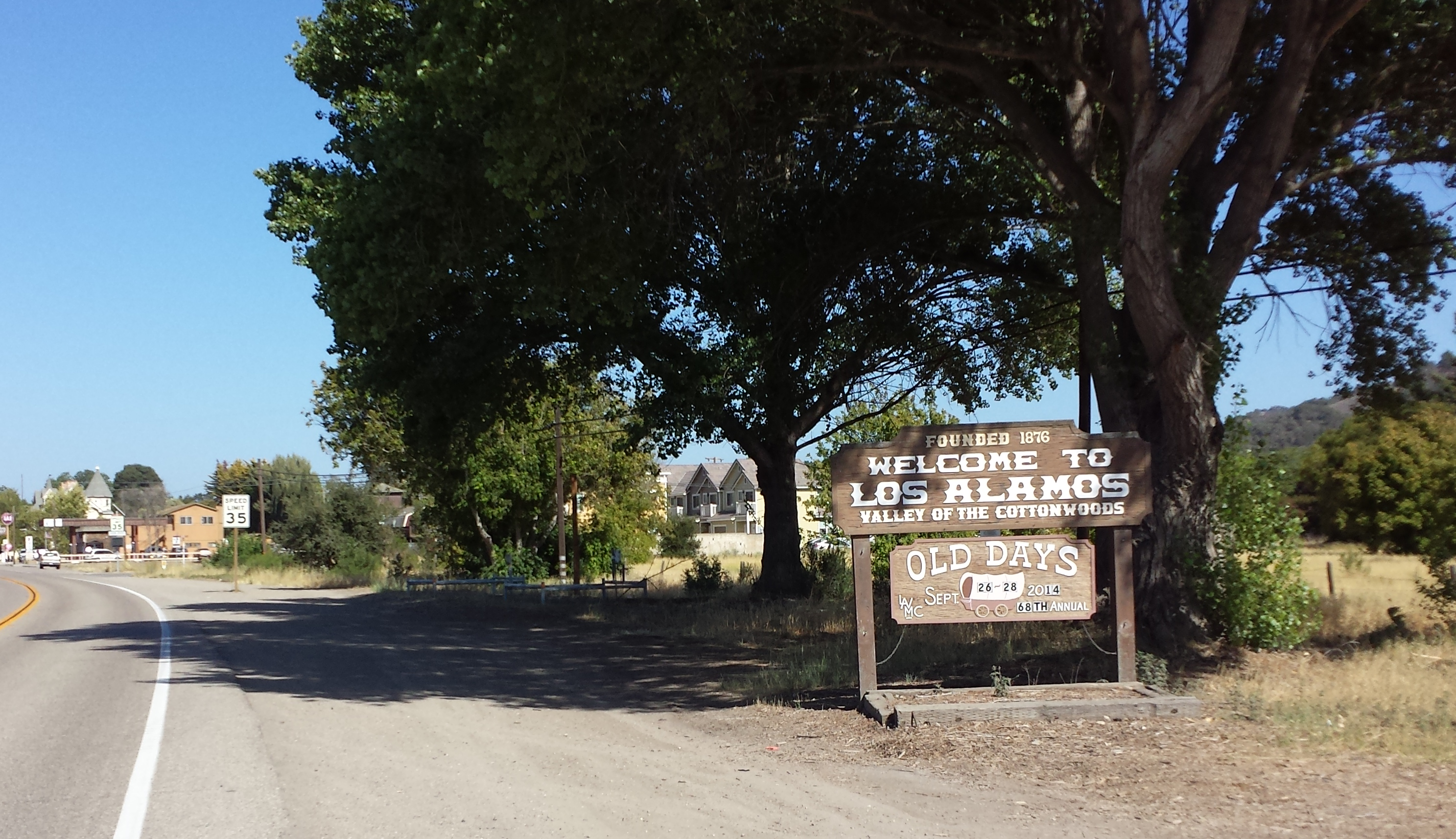
Entering Los Alamos on Route 135 (Bell Street) looking southbound, near its southern terminus

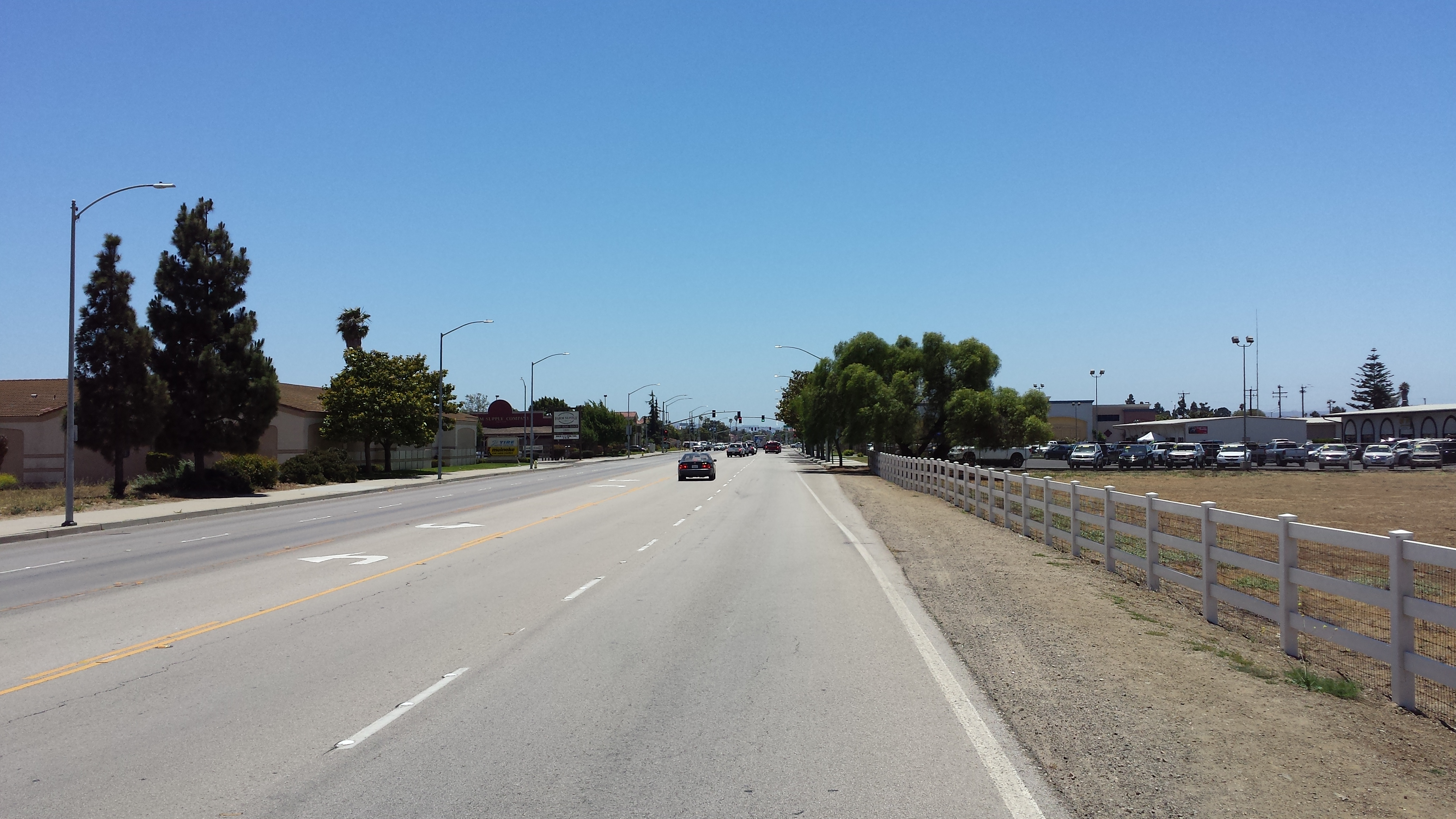
Route 135 as Broadway in Santa Maria near its northern terminus, looking southbound

Route 135 is defined in section 435 of the California Streets and Highways Code. The definition omits the concurrency with Route 1 instead of duplicating that segment in the other route's definition in the code:

Route 135 is from:
(a) Route 101 near Los Alamos to Route 1 south of Orcutt.
(b) Route 1 near Orcutt to Route 101 in Santa Maria.

SR 135 starts off as Bell Street in Los Alamos and goes along with Vandenberg Road after an intersection with Harris Grade Road before merging with State Route 1 south of Orcutt. There is a brief freeway portion at the northern split of SR 135 and SR 1, but it quickly reverts to a city street upon crossing Clark Avenue. North of Santa Maria Way, it is considered Business US 101, although signage is poor. SR 135 continues its northbound journey as Broadway and passes through the Santa Maria Town Center shopping center at the intersection with Main Street (State Route 166). SR 135 meets US 101 again just before crossing the Santa Maria River at the Santa Barbara/San Luis Obispo county line.

SR 135 north of SR 1 is part of the National Highway System, a network of highways that are considered essential to the country's economy, defense, and mobility by the Federal Highway Administration.

== History ==
State Route 135 is the original routing for US 101 from Santa Maria to Los Alamos until the current alignment was completed in 1933. However, instead of turning east just before old town Orcutt and then north into Santa Maria as it does currently, it continued north along what is now Graciosa Road and then Marcum Street linking up with E. Clark Avenue just north of the Orcutt water tower. It then followed Clark Avenue east through old Orcutt and turned north on Orcutt Road at the location of the current Highway 135/Clark Avenue interchange and headed north through Santa Maria.

Route 135 was created in 1964 to encompass most of the old routing.

== Major intersections ==
Except where prefixed with a letter, postmiles were measured on the road as it was in 1964, based on the alignment that existed at the time, and do not necessarily reflect current mileage. R reflects a realignment in the route since then, M indicates a second realignment, L refers to an overlap due to a correction or change, and T indicates postmiles classified as temporary. Segments that remain unconstructed or have been relinquished to local control may be omitted. The entire route is in Santa Barbara County.

Location	Postmile	Exit	Destinations	Notes
Los Alamos	0.00		US 101 – Santa Maria, San Francisco, Santa Barbara, Los Angeles	Interchange; south end of SR 135; US 101 exit 154
	1.00		Bell Street	Former US 101 north
	M9.10		Harris Grade Road – Lompoc	Former SR 1 south (Restricted area for trucks and autos with trailers that are over 30 feet long).
	M9.61		San Antonio Road – Vandenberg SFB	
	M11.72 R31.04 (Note: Indicates that the postmile represents the distance along SR 1 rather than SR 135.)		SR 1 south – Vandenberg SFB, Lompoc	Interchange; south end of SR 1 overlap; southbound right exit and northbound entrance; former CR S20 south
	M11.72 R31.04	South end of freeway on SR 1		
	R34.78 R9.10		SR 1 north – Guadalupe	Interchange; North end of SR 1 overlap; northbound left exit and southbound entrance
Orcutt	R10.41	17	Clark Avenue – Orcutt	
Orcutt		North end of freeway		
Santa Maria	13.00		US 101 Bus. south (Santa Maria Way) to US 101 / St. Andrews Way	South end of US 101 Bus. overlap
Santa Maria	13.54		Betteravia Road	
Santa Maria	14.78		Stowell Road	
Santa Maria	15.77		SR 166 (Main Street) – Guadalupe	
Santa Maria	16.77		Donovan Road	
Santa Maria	17.81		US 101 / SR 166	Interchange; north end of US 101 Bus. overlap; north end of SR 135; US 101 exit 173
1.000 mi = 1.609 km; 1.000 km = 0.621 mi: Concurrency terminus
