= California State Route 33 =

Highway in California

State Route 33
- SR 33 highlighted in red

Route information
- Maintained by Caltrans
- Length: 289.699 mi (466.225 km) This route is broken into pieces, and the length does not reflect the overlaps that would be required to make the route continuous.
- Existed: 1934–present
- Tourist routes: Jacinto Reyes Scenic Byway

Major junctions
- South end: US 101 / SR 1 in Ventura
- SR 150 from Mira Monte to Ojai; SR 166 from Cuyama Valley to Maricopa; SR 119 in Taft; SR 58 in McKittrick; SR 46 in Blackwells Corner; SR 41 south-southeast of Avenal; SR 269 in Avenal; I-5 at various locations; SR 152 from Dos Palos Y to near Los Banos; SR 140 in Gustine
- North end: I-5 near Tracy

Location
- Country: United States
- State: California
- Counties: Ventura, Santa Barbara, San Luis Obispo, Kern, Kings, Fresno, Merced, Stanislaus, San Joaquin

Highway system
- State highways in California; Interstate; US; State; Scenic; History; Pre‑1964; Unconstructed; Deleted; Freeways
← SR 32	→ SR 34

State Route 33 (SR 33) is a north–south state highway in the U.S. state of California. It runs north from U.S. Route 101 in Ventura through the Transverse Ranges and the western side of the San Joaquin Valley to Interstate 5 at a point east of Tracy. SR 33 replaced part of U.S. Route 399 in 1964 during the "great renumbering" of routes. In the unincorporated sections of Kern County it is known as the West Side Highway. In addition, the California Legislature designated the entire Kern County portion as the Petroleum Highway in 2004. The southernmost portion in Ventura is a freeway known as the Ojai Freeway, while it is known as the Maricopa Highway from Ojai to Maricopa.

== Route description ==
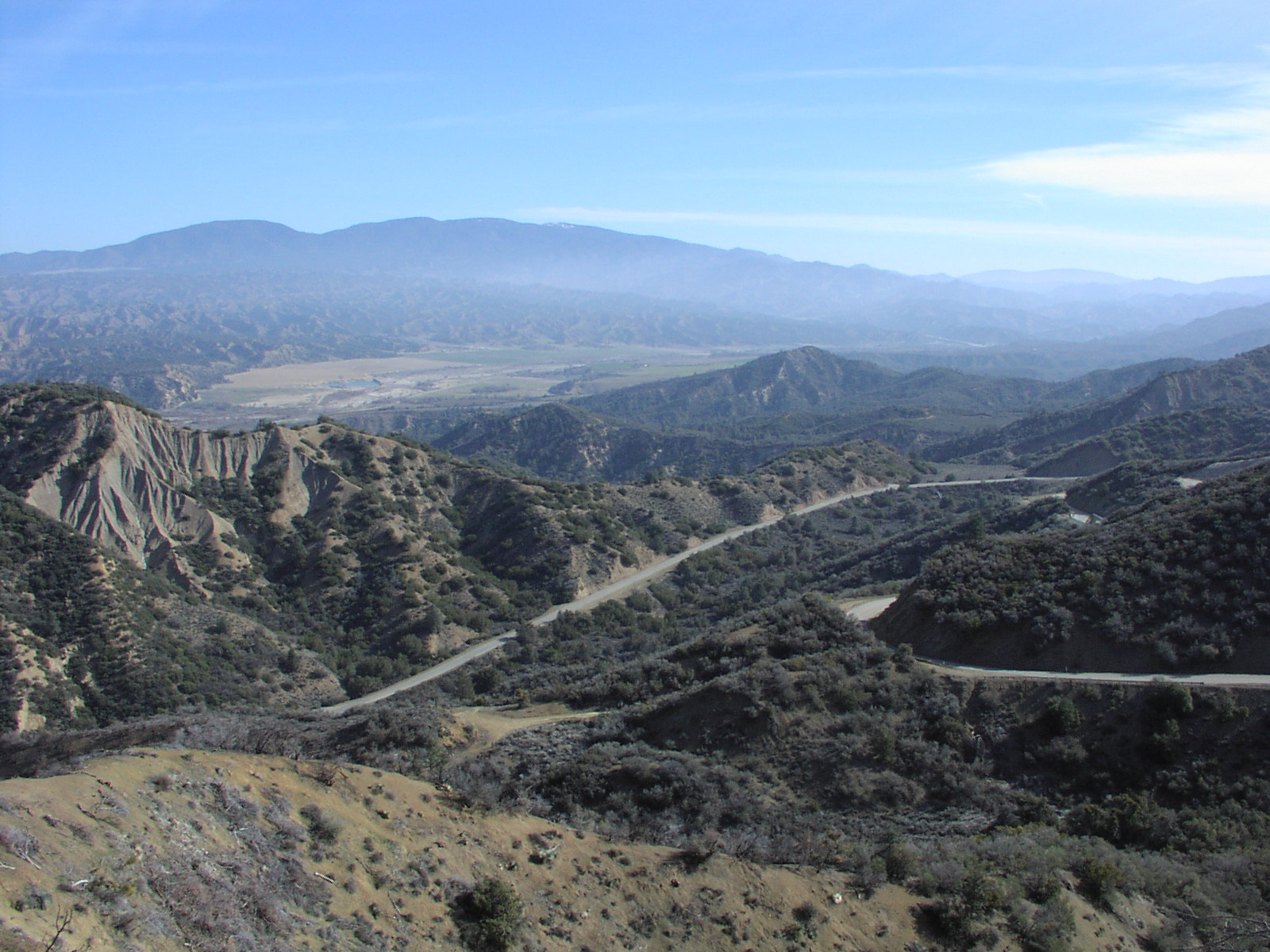
View northeast from near Pine Mountain Summit on SR 33, the highest elevation on the route. The Lockwood Valley and Mount Pinos are in the distance.

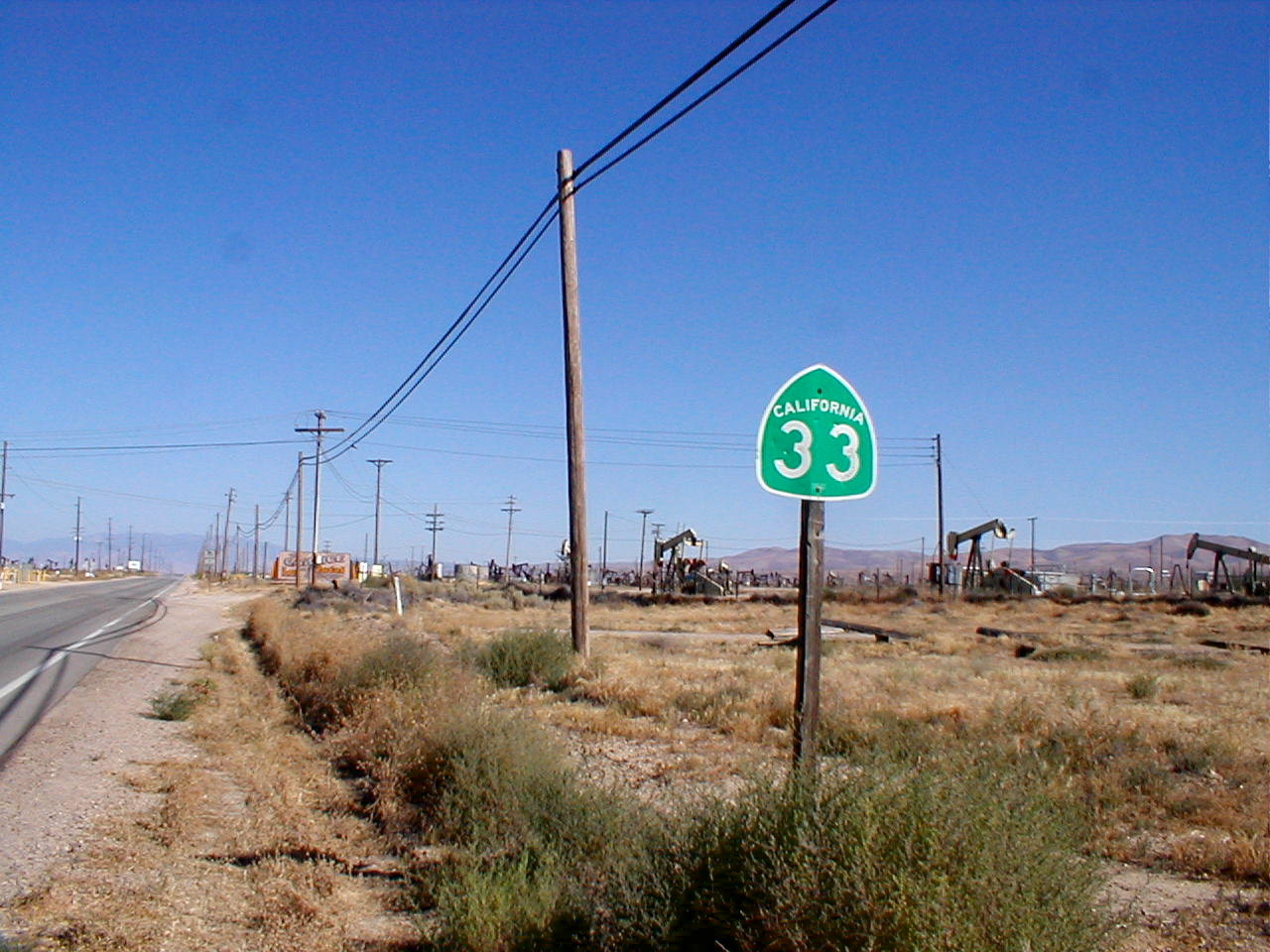
SR 33 heading south through Kern County

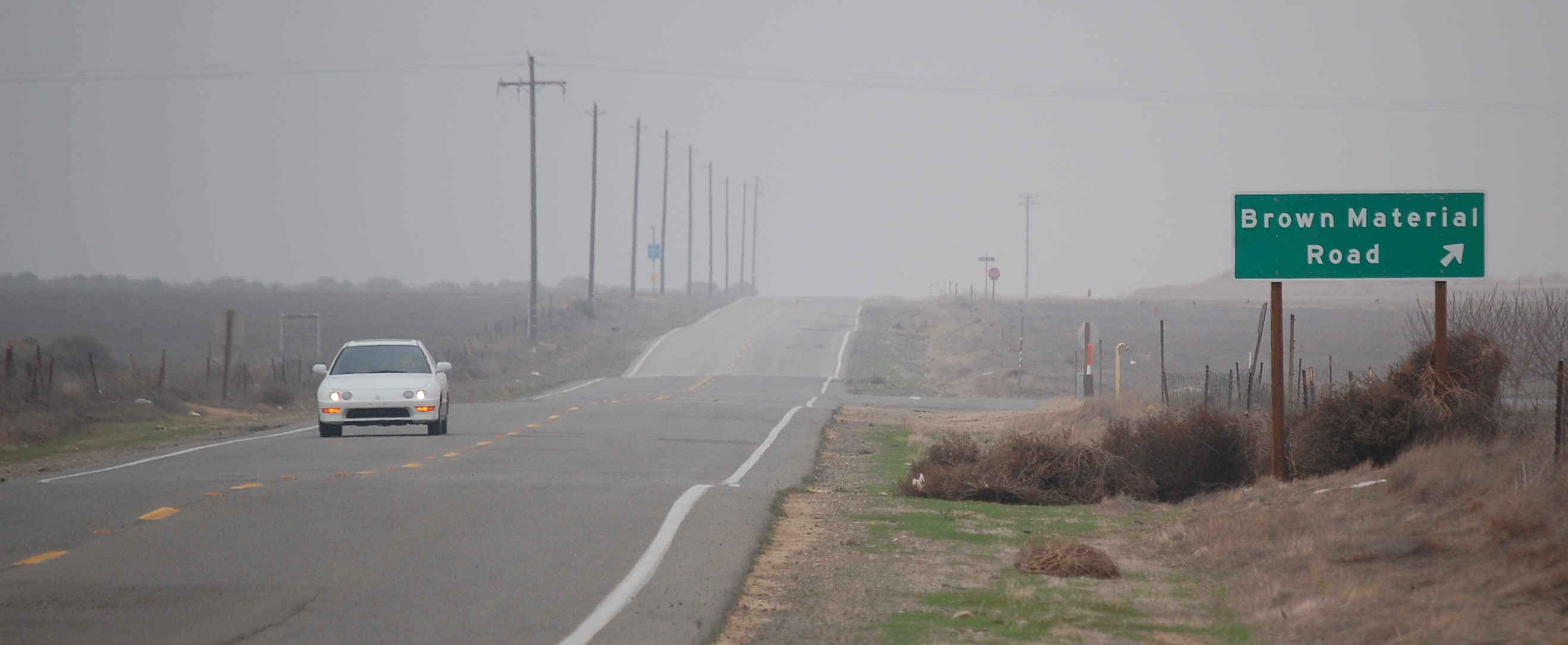
A foggy winter day looking northbound south of Brown Material Road near Blackwells Corner.

Route 33 is defined in section 333 of the California Streets and Highways Code. The definition is broken up into parts to omit the concurrencies with various other routes instead of duplicating those segments in those other routes' definitions in the code:

Route 33 is from:
(a) Route 101 near Ventura to Route 150.
(b) Route 150 to Route 5 near Oilfields via the vicinity of Cuyama Valley and Maricopa and via Coalinga.
(c) Route 5 to Route 152 via the vicinity of Mendota.
(d) Route 152 west of Los Banos to Route 5 near Santa Nella.
(e) Route 5 near Santa Nella to Route 140.
(f) Route 140 to Route 5 near Vernalis.

State Route 33 begins in Ventura as a short freeway ("Ojai Freeway"). SR 33 then continues north as Maricopa Highway, an undivided surface road, through Ojai, following Matilija Canyon past the easternmost extremity of the Santa Ynez Mountains in Los Padres National Forest, and passing over the Transverse Ranges at Pine Mountain Summit. As SR 33 comes down into the Cuyama Valley, it comes up to a junction with SR 166 east of Cuyama. Route 33 continues with Route 166 as they enter Kern County for about 20 miles (32 km) to Maricopa where the routes separate. In Maricopa, Route 33 turns northwest, following the western side of the San Joaquin Valley. Between Taft and Avenal it roughly parallels Interstate 5 and the eastern foothills of the Temblor and Diablo ranges; for the first 15 miles (24 km) of the portion following the axis of the Midway-Sunset Oil Field. Northwest of Avenal, it turns due west to enter Coalinga. It then runs concurrent with SR 198 and turns northeast through the Anticline Ridge. It soon becomes concurrent with I-5 for 13 miles (21 km). Thereafter, it departs due north near Cantua Creek, turns northwest at Mendota, through Firebaugh and meets State Route 152 in Dos Palos, in which it runs concurrently due west for approximately ten miles. It departs again west of Los Banos, turning north to Santa Nella (where it has an interchange with I-5), and roughly parallels I-5 and the San Joaquin River until its northern terminus at I-5 and Bird Road southeast of Tracy.

When passing through the Avenal/Coalinga area travelers pass near a series of prisons and government facilities. They include: Avenal State Prison, Pleasant Valley State Prison, and the Coalinga State Hospital.

In the portions of the route in Kern and Fresno Counties, SR 33 passes through one of the United States' largest petroleum extraction fields, with hundreds of nodding oil pumps along the highway. Some of the fields visible from the highway include the Midway-Sunset, South and North Belridge, Cymric, McKittrick, Lost Hills, and Coalinga oil fields.

Most of SR 33's route passes through sparsely populated, relatively desolate portions of the San Joaquin Valley. Travelers along it should use caution, since emergency services are typically dozens of miles away. Carrying extra water and coolant is especially advised, since summertime temperatures in the area routinely surpass 100 °F (38 °C).

Several segments of this route are part of the California Freeway and Expressway System, but only two segments, one south of the northern city limits of Ojai, and one near SR 152 are part of the National Highway System, a network of highways that are considered essential to the country's economy, defense, and mobility by the Federal Highway Administration. Several segments are eligible to be included in the State Scenic Highway System; however, only the portion from 6.4 miles north of the SR 150 junction to the Ventura–Santa Barbara county line is a scenic highway as designated by Caltrans, meaning that it is a substantial section of highway passing through a "memorable landscape" with no "visual intrusions", where the potential designation has gained popular favor with the community. This scenic segment is also designated as part of the Jacinto Reyes Scenic Byway, a National Forest Scenic Byway.

== History ==
Before the US 399 designation was deleted in 1964, SR 33 followed SR 166 east from US 99 at Wheeler Ridge to Maricopa in lieu of the segment from Ventura to Maricopa, and followed the old US highway from Taft to Maricopa. Today, SR 166 remains on the segment between Wheeler Ridge and Maricopa.

SR 33 used to extend north to Interstate 205 in Tracy, but this segment was relinquished to local control after the segment of Interstate 5 from SR 33 to I-205 was completed.

When Caltrans implemented its exit numbering program in 2002, SR 33's section of the Ojai Freeway was not included and is one of the very few stretches of freeway in California to not feature exit numbers.

== Major intersections ==
Except where prefixed with a letter, postmiles were measured on the road as it was in 1964, based on the alignment that existed at the time, and do not necessarily reflect current mileage. Postmile prefixes include: R reflecting a realignment in the route since then, M indicating a second realignment, L referring to an overlap due to a correction or change, and T indicating postmiles classified as temporary. Segments that remain unconstructed or have been relinquished to local control may be omitted. The numbers reset at county lines; the start and end postmiles in each county are given in the county column. All exits are unnumbered.

County	Location	Postmile	Destinations	Notes
Ventura; VEN 0.00-57.51	Ventura	0.00	US 101 (SR 1 / Ventura Freeway) – Los Angeles, San Francisco	Interchange; southbound exit and northbound entrance; south end of SR 33; US 101 exit 70B
Ventura; VEN 0.00-57.51	Ventura	0.17	Main Street – Ventura	Interchange; southbound exit and northbound entrance
Ventura; VEN 0.00-57.51	Ventura	1.57	Stanley Avenue	Interchange; southbound exit and entrance are on the left
Ventura; VEN 0.00-57.51		2.65	Shell Road	Interchange
Ventura; VEN 0.00-57.51		R4.49	Cañada Larga Road	Interchange
Ventura; VEN 0.00-57.51		R5.64	Casitas Vista Road	Interchange
Ventura; VEN 0.00-57.51	Casitas Springs		North end of freeway	
Ventura; VEN 0.00-57.51	Mira Monte	11.21 R14.41 (Note: Indicates that the postmile represents the distance along SR 150 rather than SR 33.)	SR 150 west (Baldwin Road) – Meiners Oaks, Lake Casitas, Carpinteria, Santa Barbara	South end of SR 150 overlap
Ventura; VEN 0.00-57.51	Ojai	16.58 11.21	SR 150 east (Ojai Avenue) – Ojai, Santa Paula	North end of SR 150 overlap
Ventura; VEN 0.00-57.51		48.50	Lockwood Valley Road to I-5 – Lockwood Valley	
Santa Barbara; SB 0.00-8.18	No major junctions			
San Luis Obispo; SLO 0.00-4.95		2.80	SR 166 west to US 101 – Cuyama, New Cuyama, Santa Maria	South end of SR 166 overlap
Kern; KER 0.00-73.74	Maricopa	R11.56	SR 166 east (Poso Street) to I-5 south – Los Angeles	North end of SR 166 overlap
Kern; KER 0.00-73.74	Taft	17.89	SR 119 (Taft Highway)	Former US 399 north; western terminus of SR 119
Kern; KER 0.00-73.74	McKittrick	33.45	SR 58 west – California Valley, Santa Margarita	South end of SR 58 overlap
Kern; KER 0.00-73.74	McKittrick	34.29	SR 58 east to I-5 – Buttonwillow, Bakersfield	North end of SR 58 overlap; no left turn from SR 33 south to SR 58 east, access is via a left turn at Lokern Road
Kern; KER 0.00-73.74		40.74	Lokern Road to SR 58 east – Buttonwillow	
Kern; KER 0.00-73.74	Blackwells Corner	60.09	SR 46 – Lost Hills, Wasco, Bakersfield, Paso Robles	Former US 466
Kings; KIN 0.00-18.99		7.80	SR 41 – Kettleman City, Fresno, Paso Robles	
Kings; KIN 0.00-18.99	Avenal	17.14	SR 269 (Skyline Boulevard) to I-5 – Huron, Lemoore NAS	Southern terminus of SR 269
Fresno; FRE 0.00-R83.05		10.50	Jayne Avenue to I-5 – Stratford	
Fresno; FRE 0.00-R83.05	Coalinga	15.37	Polk Street to SR 198 west – King City	
Fresno; FRE 0.00-R83.05	Coalinga	15.71	SR 198 west (Elm Avenue) / Coalinga Plaza (Fifth Street) – King City	South end of SR 198 overlap
Fresno; FRE 0.00-R83.05		24.32	SR 198 east (Dorris Avenue) / Shell Road – Lemoore, Hanford	North end of SR 198 overlap
Fresno; FRE 0.00-R83.05		R29.02 17.96 (Note: Indicates that the postmile represents the distance along I-5 rather than SR 33.)	I-5 south (West Side Freeway) / SR 145 north (Fresno-Coalinga Road) – Los Angeles, Kerman	Interchange; south end of I-5 overlap; I-5 exit 337; southern terminus of SR 145
Fresno; FRE 0.00-R83.05		R29.02 17.96	South end of freeway on I-5	
Fresno; FRE 0.00-R83.05		29.96 R39.82	North end of freeway on I-5	
Fresno; FRE 0.00-R83.05		29.96 R39.82	I-5 north (West Side Freeway) / Derrick Avenue – San Francisco, Sacramento	Interchange; north end of I-5 overlap; I-5 exit 349
Fresno; FRE 0.00-R83.05	Mendota	59.43	California Avenue, Panoche Road to SR 180 east – Fresno	
Fresno; FRE 0.00-R83.05	Mendota	61.45	CR J1 (Belmont Avenue)	
Fresno; FRE 0.00-R83.05	Mendota	62.25	SR 180 east (Oller Street) – Fresno	Western terminus of SR 180
Fresno; FRE 0.00-R83.05	Firebaugh	70.19	12th Street to I-5 north	
Merced; MER R0.00-30.00	Dos Palos Y	R5.64 R32.37 (Note: Indicates that the postmile represents the distance along SR 152 rather than SR 33.)	SR 152 east / Elgin Avenue – Merced	Interchange; south end of SR 152 overlap
Merced; MER R0.00-30.00	Los Banos	21.27	SR 165 (Mercey Springs Road) to I-5 south – Turlock	
Merced; MER R0.00-30.00		13.85	I-5 (West Side Freeway) – San Francisco, Sacramento, Los Angeles	Interchange; I-5 exits 403A-B
Merced; MER R0.00-30.00		11.27 R13.24	SR 152 west / San Luis Drive (to Gonzaga Road) – Gilroy	Interchange; north end of SR 152 overlap; SR 152 exit 60
Merced; MER R0.00-30.00	Santa Nella	R16.64	I-5 (West Side Freeway) – San Francisco, Sacramento, Los Angeles	Interchange; I-5 exit 407
Merced; MER R0.00-30.00	Gustine	26.46 4.35 (Note: Indicates that the postmile represents the distance along SR 140 rather than SR 33.)	SR 140 west (Sullivan Road) to I-5	South end of SR 140 overlap
Merced; MER R0.00-30.00	Gustine	6.06 27.11	SR 140 east / First Avenue – Merced	North end of SR 140 overlap
Stanislaus; STA 0.00-27.09	Newman	2.06	CR J18 (Stuhr Road) to I-5 – Livingston, Turlock	
Stanislaus; STA 0.00-27.09	Crows Landing	6.84	Crows Landing Road, Fink Road to I-5	
Stanislaus; STA 0.00-27.09	Patterson	12.57	CR J17 west (Sperry Avenue) to I-5	South end of CR J17 overlap
Stanislaus; STA 0.00-27.09	Patterson	13.18	CR J17 east (Las Palmas Avenue) – Turlock	North end of CR J17 overlap
Stanislaus; STA 0.00-27.09	Westley	19.55	CR J16 (Grayson Road, Howard Road) to I-5	
San Joaquin; SJ 0.00-5.00	Vernalis	0.82	SR 132 / Vernalis Road – Modesto, San Francisco	Interchange
San Joaquin; SJ 0.00-5.00		4.83	I-5 (West Side Freeway) – Stockton, Sacramento, Los Angeles	Interchange; north end of SR 33; I-5 exit 452
San Joaquin; SJ 0.00-5.00		5.00	Ahern Road – Tracy	Continuation beyond I-5; former SR 33 north
1.000 mi = 1.609 km; 1.000 km = 0.621 mi: Concurrency terminus; Incomplete access
