= Cuyama, California =

Cuyama
- census-designated place
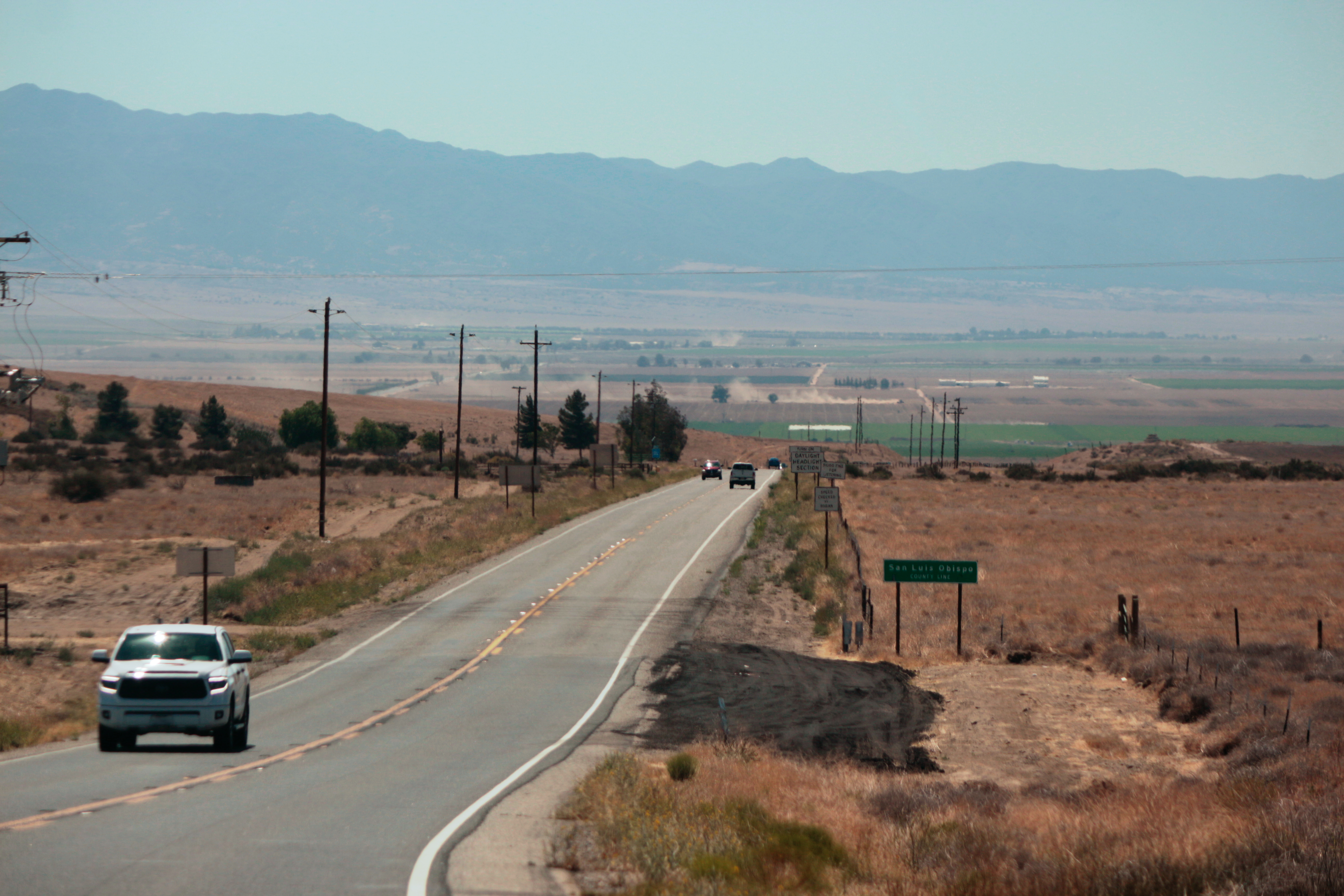
- Cuyama seen from the east, on SR-166

- Location of Cuyama in Santa Barbara County, California.

- Position in California.
- Coordinates: 34°55′52″N 119°36′54″W
- Country: United States
- State: California
- County: Santa Barbara

Area
  - Total: 0.46 sq mi (1.19 km^{2})
  - Land: 0.45 sq mi (1.17 km^{2})
  - Water: 0.0039 sq mi (0.01 km^{2}) 0.96%
- Elevation: 2,293 ft (699 m)

Population (2020)
  - Total: 37
  - Density: 81.6/sq mi (31.51/km^{2})
- Time zone: UTC-8 (Pacific (PST))
  - Summer (DST): UTC-7 (PDT)
- GNIS feature ID: 2582989

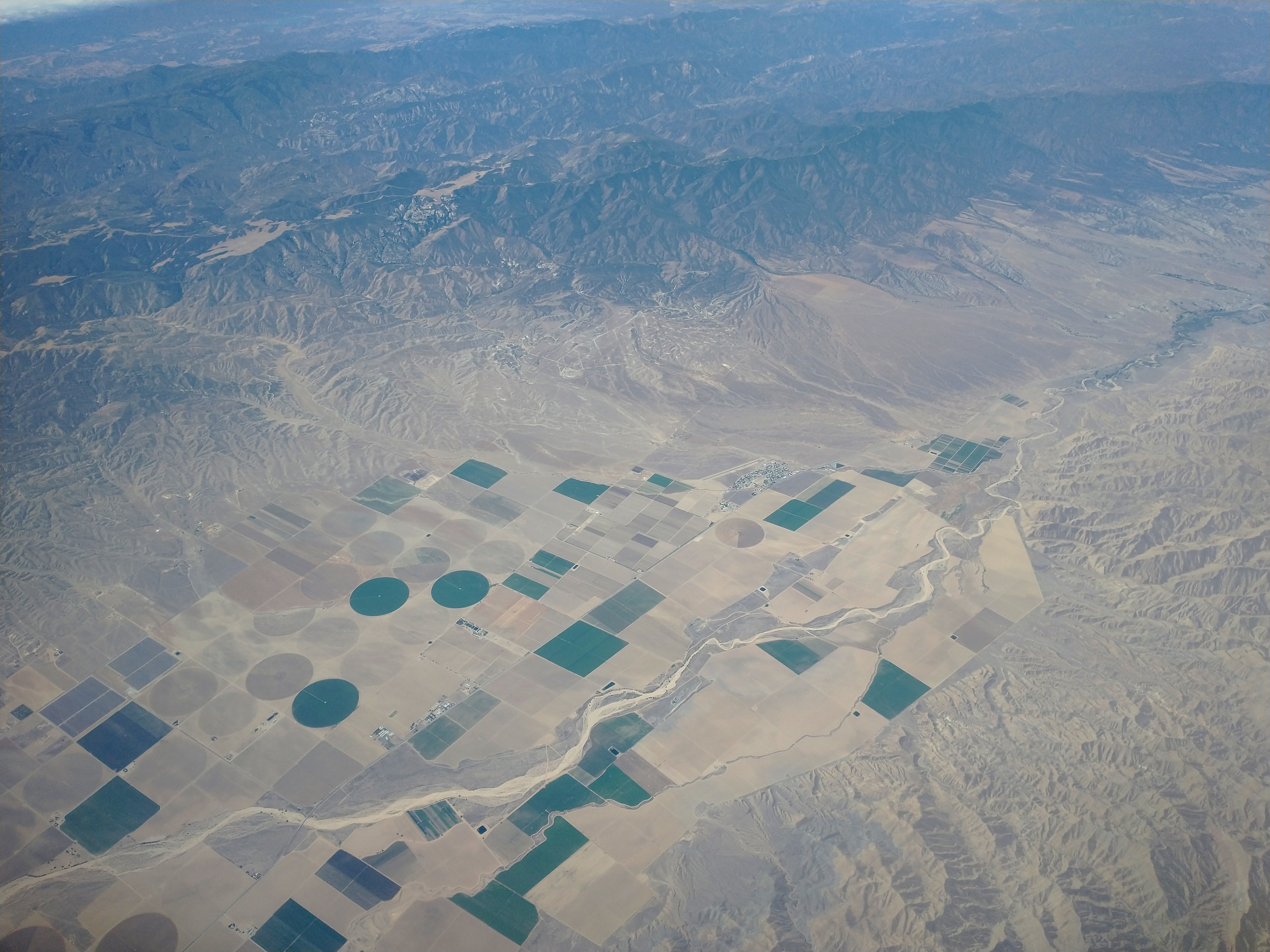
An aerial photo of Cuyama

Cuyama (/kwiːˈjɑːmə/; (Chumash: Kuyam, meaning "Clam")) is a census-designated place in Santa Barbara County. California, United States. It is located in the Cuyama Valley, near the Carrizo Plain. The Cuyama River runs adjacent to the town, flowing west towards the Pacific Ocean. Cuyama is surrounded by many apricot, peach, and plum orchards. The ZIP Code is 93254, and the community served by area code 805. The population was 37 at the 2020 census. The name "Cuyama" comes from an Indian village named Kuyam.

Cuyama is located on California State Route 166 2.5 miles (4 km) east of its much larger neighbor New Cuyama.

South of the town is the Sierra Madre mountain range, most of which is included in the Los Padres National Forest. Considerable oil and gas development has taken place at the South Cuyama Oil Field in the foothills of the Sierra Madre, just south of Cuyama and adjacent New Cuyama. In July 2005, 52,000 acres (210 km^{2}) in Los Padres National Forest, mostly in the region immediately south of Cuyama, was opened up to further development by the National Forest Service.

== History ==
Rancho Cuyama, which consisted of 22,200 acres, was granted to Jose Maria Rojo in 1843. In 1943, Richfield Oil Company started oil exploration in the area, followed by the Norris Oil Company five years later. In 1952, Atlantic Richfield established New Cuyama four miles west of Cuyama to house its employees.

== Geography ==
According to the United States Census Bureau, the CDP covers an area of 0.5 square mile (1.2 km^{2}), of which 99.04% is land, and 0.96% is water.

=== Climate ===
This region experiences hot and dry summers, with the warmest month having a daily mean of 75 °F (24 °C). According to the Köppen Climate Classification system, Cuyama has a hot-summer Mediterranean climate, abbreviated "Csa" on climate maps.

Climate data for Cuyuma, California (New Cuyuma)
Month	Jan	Feb	Mar	Apr	May	Jun	Jul	Aug	Sep	Oct	Nov	Dec	Year
Mean daily maximum °C (°F)	16 (61)	17 (62)	18 (65)	22 (71)	27 (80)	31 (88)	34 (94)	34 (93)	31 (87)	26 (78)	19 (66)	16 (61)	24 (75)
Mean daily minimum °C (°F)	0 (32)	1 (34)	2 (36)	3 (38)	7 (44)	11 (51)	13 (56)	13 (55)	11 (51)	6 (43)	2 (35)	0 (32)	6 (42)
Average precipitation mm (inches)	38 (1.5)	43 (1.7)	41 (1.6)	13 (0.5)	5.1 (0.2)	0 (0)	2.5 (0.1)	2.5 (0.1)	10 (0.4)	7.6 (0.3)	15 (0.6)	28 (1.1)	200 (8)
Source: Weatherbase

== Demographics ==
Historical population
Census	Pop.	Note	%±
2010	57		—
2020	37		−35.1%
U.S. Decennial Census; 1860–1870 1880-1890; 1900 1910 1920; 1930 1940 1950; 1960 1970 1980; 1990 2000 2010; 2020

Cuyama first appeared as a census designated place in the 2010 U.S. census.

=== Racial and ethnic composition ===
Cuyama CDP, California – Racial and ethnic composition Note: the US Census treats Hispanic/Latino as an ethnic category. This table excludes Latinos from the racial categories and assigns them to a separate category. Hispanics/Latinos may be of any race.
Race / Ethnicity (NH = Non-Hispanic)	Pop 2010	Pop 2020	% 2010	% 2020
White alone (NH)	15	14	26.32%	37.84%
Black or African American alone (NH)	0	0	0.00%	0.00%
Native American or Alaska Native alone (NH)	2	1	3.51%	2.70%
Asian alone (NH)	0	0	0.00%	0.00%
Native Hawaiian or Pacific Islander alone (NH)	0	1	0.00%	2.70%
Other race alone (NH)	0	0	0.00%	0.00%
Mixed race or Multiracial (NH)	0	4	0.00%	10.81%
Hispanic or Latino (any race)	40	17	70.18%	45.95%
Total	57	37	100.00%	100.00%

=== 2010 census ===
The 2010 United States census reported that Cuyama had a population of 57. The population density was 124.5 inhabitants per square mile (48.1/km^{2}). The racial makeup of Cuyama was 40 (70.2%) White, 0 (0.0%) African American, 2 (3.5%) Native American, 0 (0.0%) Asian, 0 (0.0%) Pacific Islander, 14 (24.6%) from other races, and 1 (1.8%) from two or more races. Hispanic or Latino of any race were 40 persons (70.2%).

The Census reported that 57 people (100% of the population) lived in households, 0 (0%) lived in non-institutionalized group quarters, and 0 (0%) were institutionalized.

There were 20 households, out of which 7 (35.0%) had children under the age of 18 living in them, 9 (45.0%) were opposite-sex married couples living together, 1 (5.0%) had a female householder with no husband present, 2 (10.0%) had a male householder with no wife present. There were 2 (10.0%) unmarried opposite-sex partnerships, and 0 (0%) same-sex married couples or partnerships. 6 households (30.0%) were made up of individuals, and 2 (10.0%) had someone living alone who was 65 years of age or older. The average household size was 2.85. There were 12 families (60.0% of all households); the average family size was 3.75.

The population was spread out, with 14 people (24.6%) under the age of 18, 8 people (14.0%) aged 18 to 24, 13 people (22.8%) aged 25 to 44, 17 people (29.8%) aged 45 to 64, and 5 people (8.8%) who were 65 years of age or older. The median age was 34.2 years. For every 100 females, there were 137.5 males. For every 100 females age 18 and over, there were 152.9 males.

There were 30 housing units at an average density of 65.5 per square mile (25.3/km^{2}), of which 10 (50.0%) were owner-occupied, and 10 (50.0%) were occupied by renters. The homeowner vacancy rate was 0%; the rental vacancy rate was 23.1%. 27 people (47.4% of the population) lived in owner-occupied housing units and 30 people (52.6%) lived in rental housing units.

== See also ==
- USS Cuyama (AO-3) — a fleet oiler built in 1916.
