= Caliente Range =

Mountain range in California, U.S.

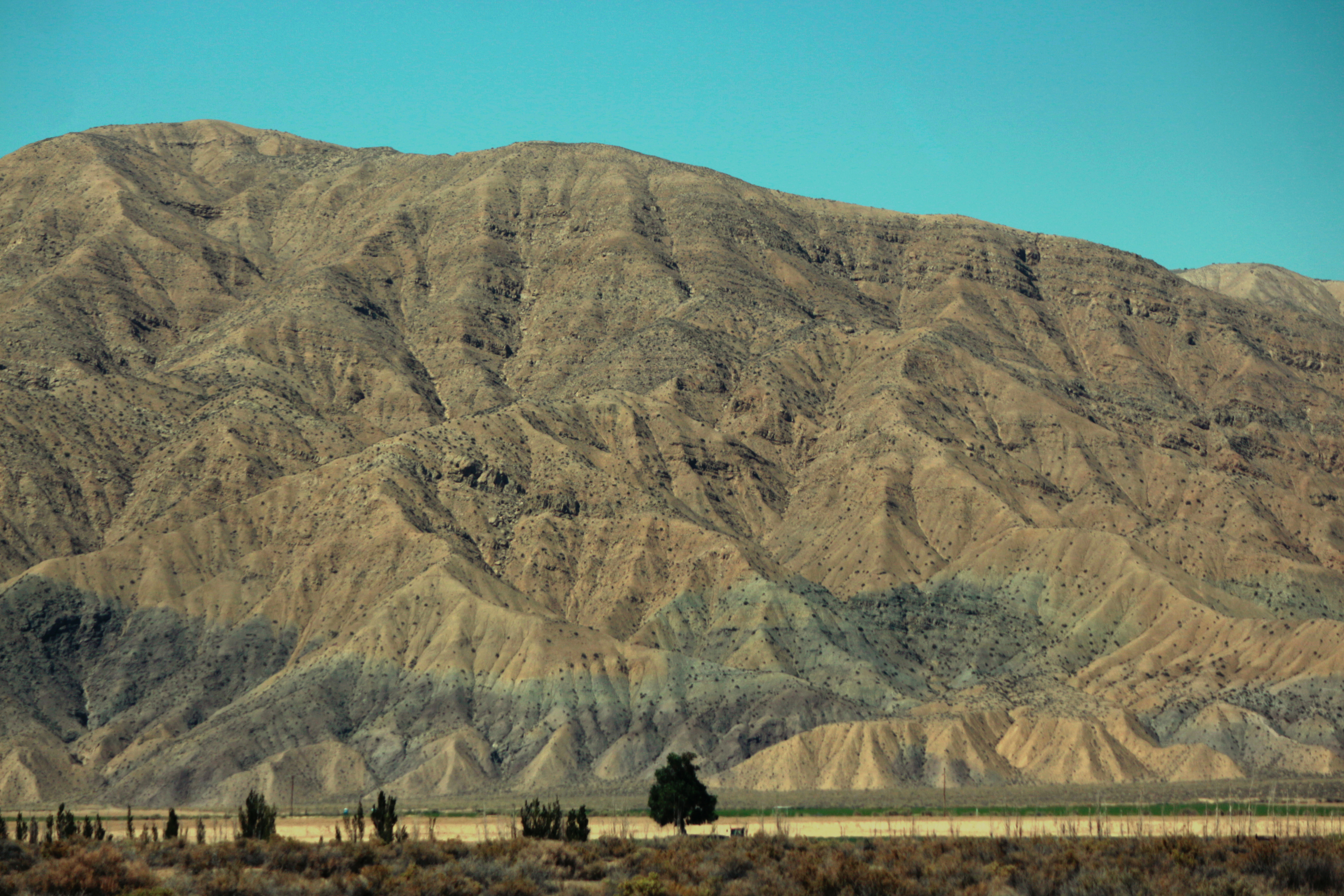
- The Caliente Range, viewed looking north from SR-166

Highest point
- Elevation: 1,325 m (4,347 ft)

Geography
- Location within California
- Country: United States
- State: California
- District: San Luis Obispo County
- Range coordinates: 35°5′14.904″N 119°48′32.480″W
- Topo map: USGS Caliente Mountain

The Caliente Range is a west–east trending zone of uplift mountains in the California Coast Ranges, in central California. The highest peak of the range is Caliente Mountain at 5,106 feet (1,556 m) in elevation, located in southeastern San Luis Obispo County.

== Geology ==
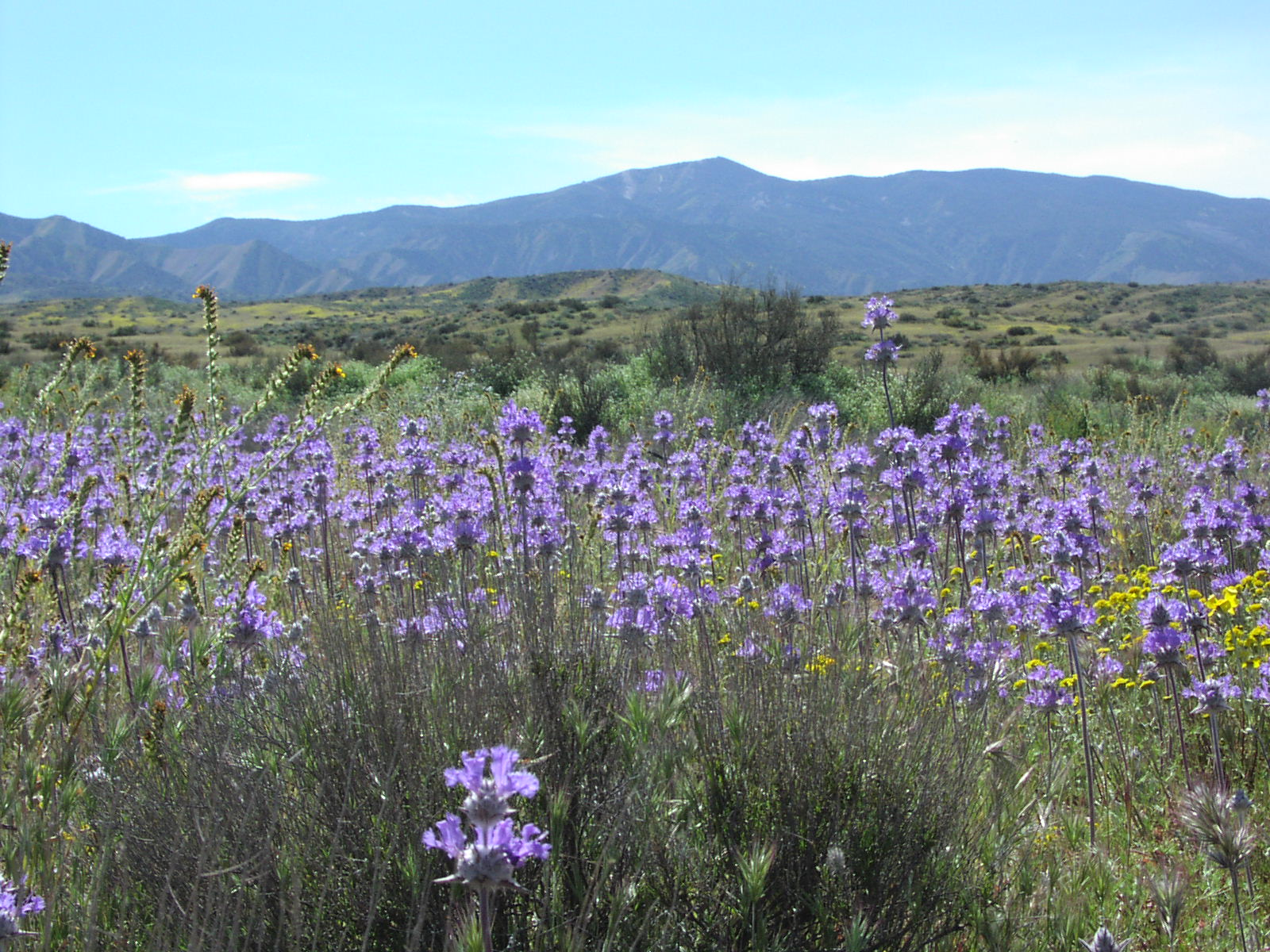
Caliente Range from the Carrizo Plain, with Caliente Peak at top center

The range is an anticlinal structure with a sharp southern boundary defined by the Morales Thrust Fault, along which runs the Cuyama River. The Cuyama Valley separates the Caliente Range from the Sierra Madre Mountains in neighboring Santa Barbara County to the south. To the northeast, the range is bounded by the Carrizo Plain. To the northwest, the range is abutted by the La Panza and Santa Lucia Ranges, two northwest–southeast trending units of the Pacific Coast Ranges.

The rocks of the Caliente range are dominated by marine and terrestrial sedimentary deposits laid down over the last 30 million years. Within them are some volcanic units, prominent particularly in the foothills beginning at the Carrizo Plain. These volcanic rocks are of Tertiary age, and are mostly basalt.

== Land use and accessibility ==
Most of the Caliente Range is public land, owned and managed by the Bureau of Land Management. Portions are privately owned, and some of the foothills in the northeast are within the protection of the Carrizo Plain National Monument.

The peak is accessible to non-motorized traffic via a gated road. The skeleton of an old cabin remains on the peak. This cabin was a lookout point during the Second World War, as an observer on this prominent peak would have been able to see and report Japanese airplanes coming inland to bomb the important oil fields in Kern County. Dips and rises along the ridgeline road leading to the lookout point equal about 2,700 feet (820 m) in elevation gain in the course of the 17-mile (27 km) round-trip journey from the locked gate to the peak and back.

== Climate ==
The higher peaks of the range get more precipitation than the lowlands due to orographic lift of passing storms. Some snow falls on the highest parts of the range.
