= California State Route 166 =

Highway in California

State Route 166

- Map of western California with SR 166 highlighted in red

Route information
- Maintained by Caltrans
- Length: 95.886 mi (154.314 km) SR 166 is broken into pieces, and the length does not reflect the US 101 and SR 33 overlaps that would be required to make the route continuous.

Major junctions
- West end: SR 1 in Guadalupe
- SR 135 in Santa Maria; US 101 in Santa Maria; SR 33 from Cuyama Valley to Maricopa; I-5 near Mettler
- East end: SR 99 at Mettler

Location
- Country: United States
- State: California
- Counties: Santa Barbara, San Luis Obispo, Kern

Highway system
- State highways in California; Interstate; US; State; Scenic; History; Pre‑1964; Unconstructed; Deleted; Freeways
← SR 165	→ SR 167

State Route 166 (SR 166) is a state highway in the U.S. state of California. It connects the Central Coast to the southern San Joaquin Valley, running from State Route 1 in Guadalupe and through Santa Maria in Santa Barbara County to State Route 99 in Mettler in Kern County.

== Route description ==
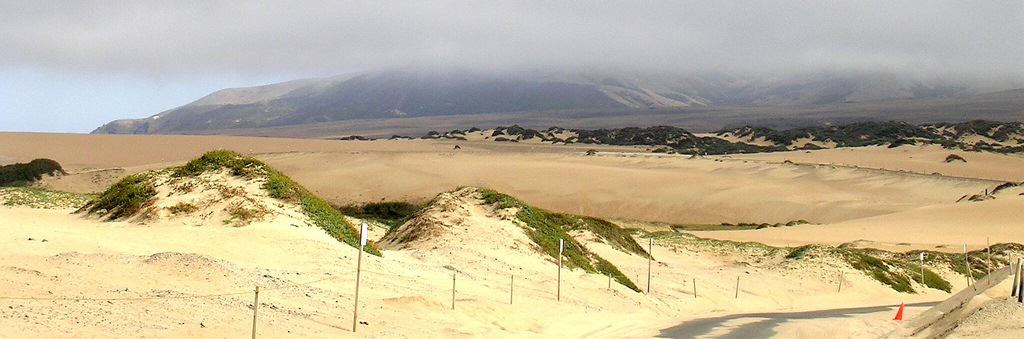
The western terminus of Route 166 snakes through the Guadalupe-Nipomo Dunes, which end at the Pacific Ocean

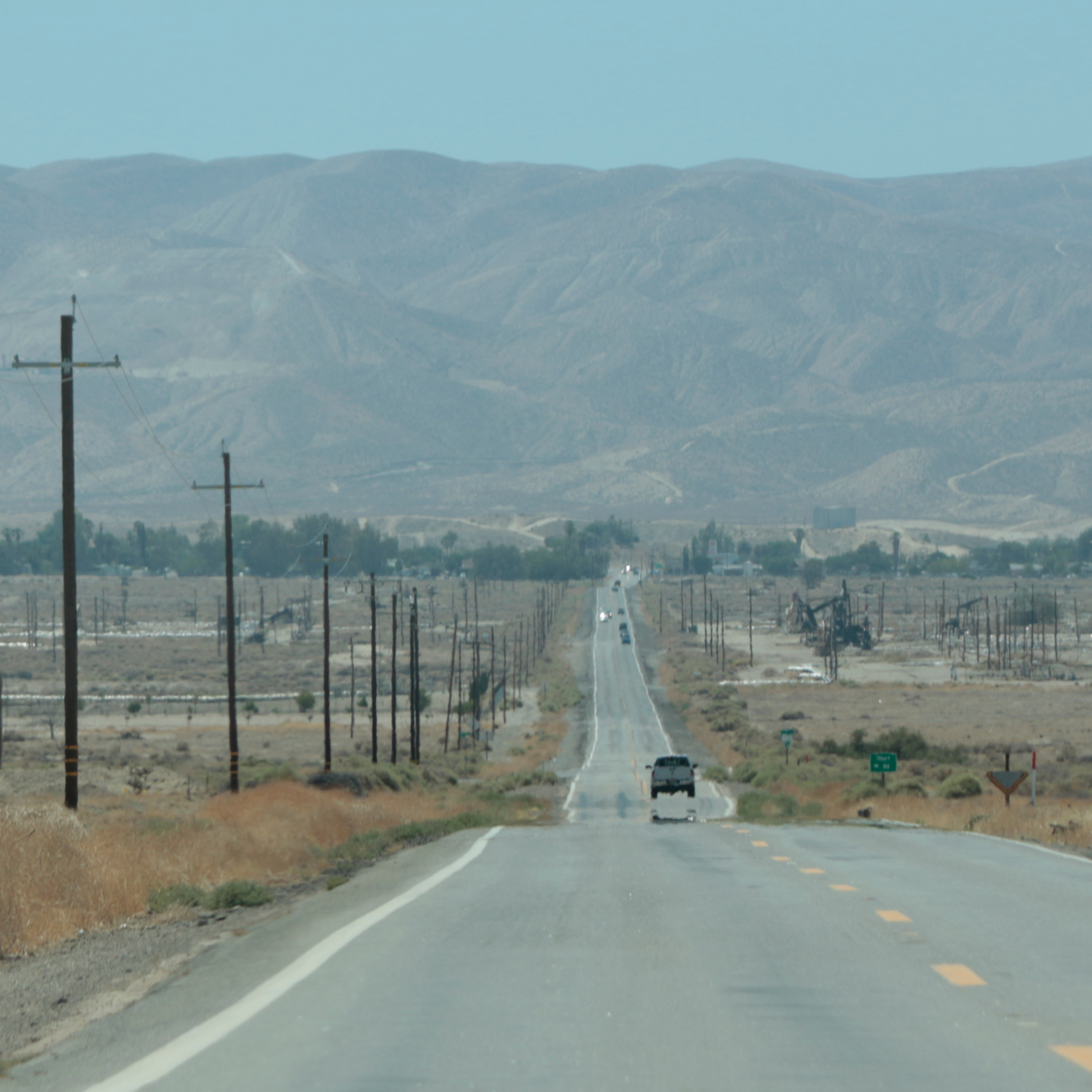
SR 166 near Maricopa, looking west

Route 166 is defined in section 466 of the California Streets and Highways Code. The definition omits the concurrencies with Route 101 and Route 33 instead of duplicating those segments in the other routes' definitions in the code:

Route 166 is from:
(a) Route 1 near Guadalupe to Route 101 in Santa Maria.
(b) Route 101 near Santa Maria to Route 33 in Cuyama Valley.
(c) Route 33 near Maricopa easterly to Route 99.

Route 166 starts off in Guadalupe in northwestern Santa Barbara County and heads east towards Santa Maria, the largest city on its eastern journey. It then joins with U.S. Route 101 for the last few miles in Santa Barbara County before crossing the Santa Maria River and splitting off in San Luis Obispo County. For the next 75 miles (121 km), SR 166 crosses the Santa Barbara/San Luis Obispo county line a total of five times. This stretch follows the Cuyama River through a canyon separating the Sierra Madre Mountains from mountains in San Luis Obispo County, and then opens out into the Cuyama Valley, passing cattle ranches, going through the Russell Ranch Oil Field, and passing Aliso Canyon Road, the turnoff to the South Cuyama Oil Field. On the north during this stretch is the mile-high Caliente Range, which contains Caliente Mountain, the highest peak in San Luis Obispo County.

After going through the towns of New Cuyama and Cuyama, the highway meets SR 33 north of Ventucopa. SR 33 and SR 166 merge until reaching Maricopa, where SR 166 heads due east for its last 20 miles (32 km), intersecting with I-5 about 9 miles (14 km) north of the Grapevine. SR 166 ends at SR 99 in Mettler, and it is the last exit for both I-5 and SR 99 southbound before they merge near Wheeler Ridge.

In Kern County, Highway 166 is known as the Maricopa Highway. West of Maricopa, where it skirts Santa Barbara and San Luis Obispo counties, it is called the Cuyama Highway. In the cities of Santa Maria and Guadalupe, it is known as Main Street.

SR 166 is part of the California Freeway and Expressway System, but is not part of the National Highway System, a network of highways that are considered essential to the country's economy, defense, and mobility by the Federal Highway Administration. The route is eligible for the State Scenic Highway System, but it is not officially designated as a scenic highway by the California Department of Transportation. From US 101 to SR 33, SR 166 is known as the "CHP Officers Irvine and Stovall Memorial Highway". In February 1998, a large storm swelled the Cuyama River and caused it to wash out a section of the highway. Officers Britt Irvine and Rick Stovall were responding to an early morning call about a truck accident when their CHP cruiser drove off the washed out section.

== History ==
Before 1964, the portion of SR 166 merged with SR 33 was part of US 399.

The route was originally part of California's Legislative Route 57, established in 1991, and was designated State Route 166 in 1934. Its eastern terminus originally connected with route 99 south of Bakersfield.

== Major intersections ==
Except where prefixed with a letter, postmiles were measured on the road as it was in 1964, based on the alignment that existed at the time, and do not necessarily reflect current mileage. Postmile prefixes include: R reflecting a realignment in the route since then, M indicating a second realignment, L referring to an overlap due to a correction or change, and T indicating postmiles classified as temporary. Segments that remain unconstructed or have been relinquished to local control may be omitted. The numbers reset at county lines; the start and end postmiles in each county are given in the county column.

County	Location	Postmile	Exit	Destinations	Notes
Santa Barbara; SB 0.00-90.99 (Note: Indicates that the postmile represents the distance along US 101 rather than SR 166.)	Guadalupe	0.00		West Main Street	Continuation beyond SR 1
Santa Barbara; SB 0.00-90.99	Guadalupe	0.00		SR 1 (Guadalupe Street)	West end of SR 166
Santa Barbara; SB 0.00-90.99	Santa Maria	7.87		SR 135 (Broadway / US 101 Bus.)	
Santa Barbara; SB 0.00-90.99	Santa Maria	8.93 88.60		US 101 south / Main Street	Interchange; west end of US 101 overlap; US 101 north exit 171; Main Street serves Dignity Health – Marian Regional Medical Center
Santa Barbara; SB 0.00-90.99	Santa Maria	8.93 88.60	West end of freeway on US 101		
Santa Barbara; SB 0.00-90.99	Santa Maria	89.69	172	Donovan Road	
Santa Barbara; SB 0.00-90.99	Santa Maria	90.75	173	SR 135 south (Broadway / US 101 Bus. south) – Santa Maria	Northern terminus of SR 135
San Luis Obispo; SLO 0.00-22.89		0.81 13.51	East end of freeway on US 101		
San Luis Obispo; SLO 0.00-22.89		0.81 13.51		US 101 north / Cuyama Lane	Interchange; east end of US 101 overlap; US 101 south exit 175
Santa Barbara; SB 22.89-R34.99	No major junctions				
San Luis Obispo; SLO R34.99-R51.09	No major junctions				
Santa Barbara; SB R51.09-R70.14	No major junctions				
San Luis Obispo; SLO R70.14-4.95 (Note: Indicates that the postmile represents the distance along SR 33 rather than SR 166.)		74.72 2.80		SR 33 south – Ojai, Ventura	West end of SR 33 overlap; former US 399 south
Kern; KER 0.00-24.62	Maricopa	R11.56 0.01		SR 33 north (California Street) to I-5 north – Central District, Taft	East end of SR 33 overlap; former US 399 north
Kern; KER 0.00-24.62		14.86		Old River Road – Old River	
Kern; KER 0.00-24.62		22.80		I-5 (West Side Freeway)	Interchange; I-5 exit 225
Kern; KER 0.00-24.62	Mettler	24.62		Mettler Frontage Road West – Mettler	
Kern; KER 0.00-24.62	Mettler	24.62		SR 99 – Los Angeles, Bakersfield	Interchange; east end of SR 166; former US 99; SR 99 exit 3
1.000 mi = 1.609 km; 1.000 km = 0.621 mi: Concurrency terminus
