= Maricopa, California =

City in California, United States

City of Maricopa
- City
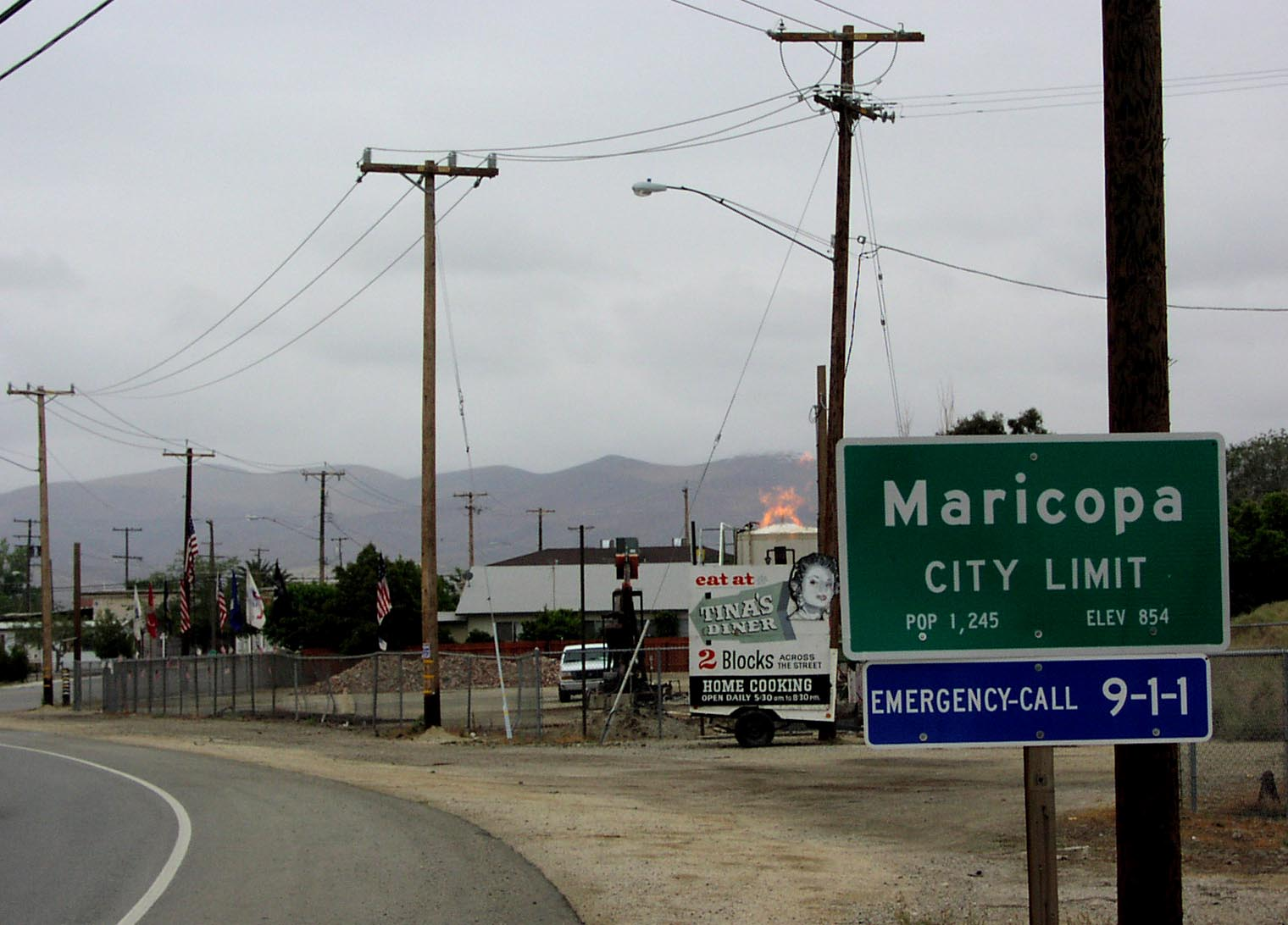
- Northern city limit of Maricopa; the fire in the center is a gas flare from an active oil well
- Interactive map of City of Maricopa
- Location in the United States
- Coordinates: 35°03′32″N 119°24′03″W
- Country: United States
- State: California
- County: Kern
- Incorporated: July 25, 1911
- Named for: Exonym given to the Quechan by the Akimel O'odham

Government
  - State Senator: Shannon Grove (R)
  - Assemblymember: Stan Ellis (R)
  - U. S. Rep.: Vince Fong (R)

Area
  - Total: 1.56 sq mi (4.05 km^{2})
  - Land: 1.56 sq mi (4.05 km^{2})
  - Water: 0 sq mi (0.00 km^{2}) 0%
- Elevation: 883 ft (269 m)

Population (2020)
  - Total: 1,026
  - Density: 656/sq mi (253/km^{2})
- Time zone: UTC-8 (PST)
  - Summer (DST): UTC-7 (PDT)
- ZIP code: 93252
- Area code: 661
- FIPS code: 06-45736
- GNIS feature IDs: 1652749, 2411033
- Website: cityofmaricopa.org

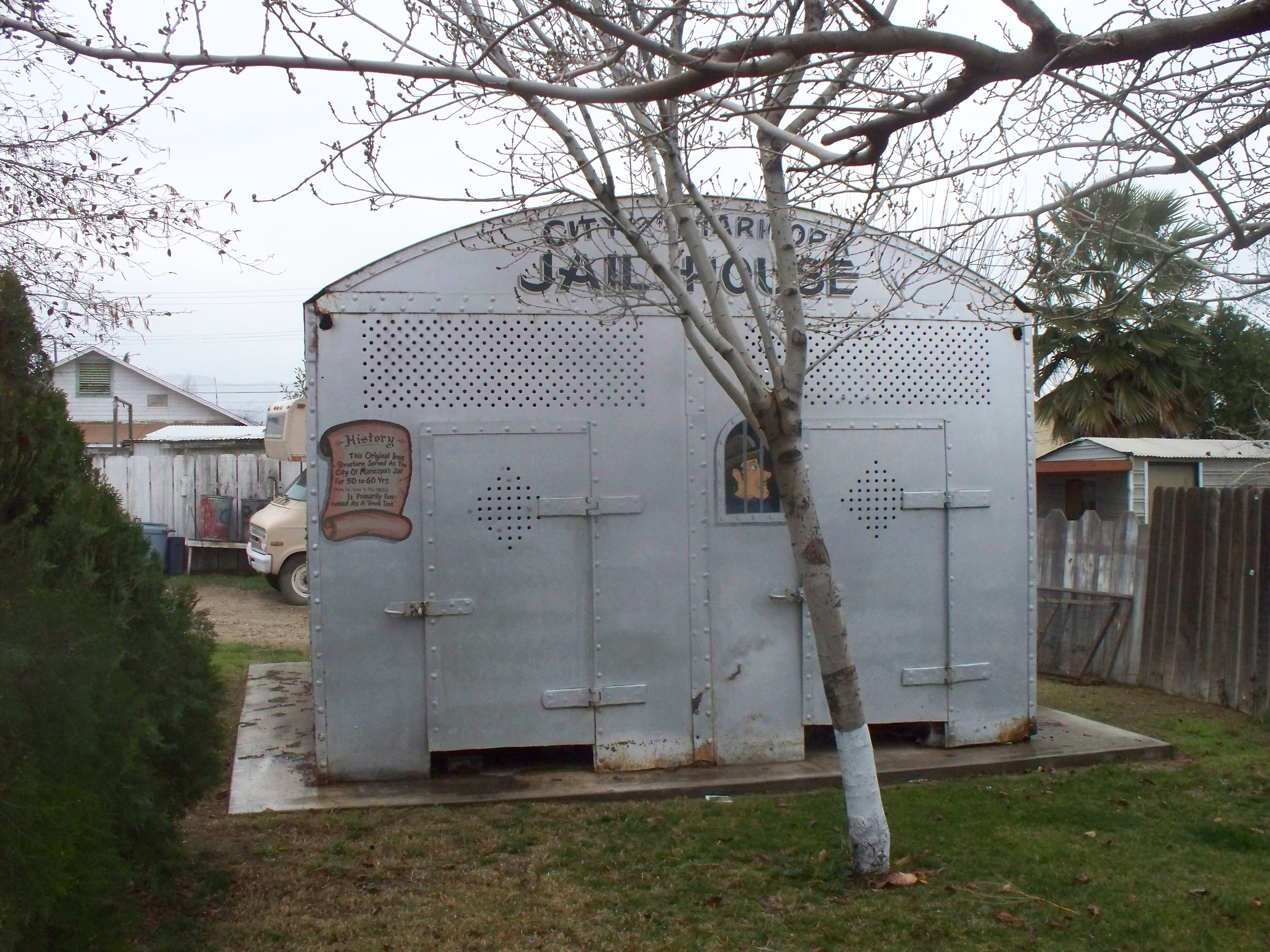
Old Maricopa Jail House. Served as a "drunk tank" from the 1910s to the 1960s.

Maricopa is a city in Kern County, California, United States. Maricopa is located 6.5 miles (10 km) south-southeast of Taft, at an elevation of 883 feet (269 m). The population was 1,026 at the 2020 census, down from 1,154 at the 2010 census. The Carrizo Plain is located to the northwest, and the enormous Midway-Sunset Oil Field, the third largest oil field in the United States, is adjacent to the north and east.

== Geography ==
According to the United States Census Bureau, the city has a total area of 1.6 square miles (4.1 km^{2}), all land. Maricopa is in the extreme southwestern corner of the San Joaquin Valley, on the first rise of land into the foothills of the Coast Ranges, with the Temblor Range, following the San Andreas Fault, trending northwest of town, and the San Emigdio Mountains to the southeast. The climate of the area is hot and semi-arid, with summertime temperatures routinely exceeding 100 °F (38 °C). Freezes occur in the winter, with the mean period without freezes being about 275 days. Approximately six inches of rain fall annually in Maricopa.

== History ==
The first post office opened in 1901, and Maricopa incorporated in 1911. The city was named after the Maricopa people.

== Demographics ==
Historical population
Census	Pop.	Note	%±
1920	1,121		—
1930	1,071		−4.5%
1940	670		−37.4%
1950	800		19.4%
1960	648		−19.0%
1970	740		14.2%
1980	946		27.8%
1990	1,193		26.1%
2000	1,111		−6.9%
2010	1,154		3.9%
2020	1,026		−11.1%
U.S. Decennial Census

=== Racial and ethnic composition ===
Maricopa city, California – Racial and ethnic composition Note: the US Census treats Hispanic/Latino as an ethnic category. This table excludes Latinos from the racial categories and assigns them to a separate category. Hispanics/Latinos may be of any race.
Race / Ethnicity (NH = Non-Hispanic)	Pop 2000	Pop 2010	Pop 2020	% 2000	% 2010	% 2020
White alone (NH)	914	854	626	82.27%	74.00%	61.01%
Black or African American alone (NH)	0	1	13	0.00%	0.09%	1.27%
Native American or Alaska Native alone (NH)	21	23	27	1.89%	1.99%	2.63%
Asian alone (NH)	5	16	6	0.45%	1.39%	0.58%
Native Hawaiian or Pacific Islander alone (NH)	0	1	2	0.00%	0.09%	0.19%
Other race alone (NH)	0	0	0	0.00%	0.00%	0.00%
Mixed race or Multiracial (NH)	21	27	49	1.89%	2.34%	4.78%
Hispanic or Latino (any race)	150	232	303	13.50%	20.10%	29.53%
Total	1,111	1,154	1,026	100.00%	100.00%	100.00%

=== 2020 census ===
As of the 2020 census, Maricopa had a population of 1,026 and a population density of 655.6 inhabitants per square mile (253.1/km^{2}). The median age was 37.5 years. For every 100 females, there were 106.0 males, and for every 100 females age 18 and over, there were 107.9 males.

The age distribution was 263 people (25.6%) under the age of 18, 79 people (7.7%) aged 18 to 24, 233 people (22.7%) aged 25 to 44, 275 people (26.8%) aged 45 to 64, and 176 people (17.2%) who were 65 years of age or older.

The whole population lived in households. There were 372 households, out of which 136 (36.6%) had children under the age of 18 living in them, 150 (40.3%) were married-couple households, 35 (9.4%) were cohabiting couple households, 84 (22.6%) had a female householder with no spouse or partner present, and 103 (27.7%) had a male householder with no spouse or partner present. 94 households (25.3%) were one person, and 44 (11.8%) were one person aged 65 or older. The average household size was 2.76. There were 256 families (68.8% of all households).

There were 432 housing units at an average density of 276.0 units per square mile (106.6 units/km^{2}), of which 372 (86.1%) were occupied. Of these, 246 (66.1%) were owner-occupied, and 126 (33.9%) were occupied by renters. The homeowner vacancy rate was 3.5% and the rental vacancy rate was 15.1%.

0.0% of residents lived in urban areas, while 100.0% lived in rural areas.

=== Income and poverty ===
In 2023, the US Census Bureau estimated that the median household income was $38,676, and the per capita income was $20,492. About 13.4% of families and 16.7% of the population were below the poverty line.

=== 2010 census ===
At the 2010 census Maricopa had a population of 1,154. The population density was 768.4 inhabitants per square mile (296.7/km^{2}). The racial makeup of Maricopa was 958 (83.0%) White, 1 (0.1%) African American, 27 (2.3%) Native American, 16 (1.4%) Asian, 2 (0.2%) Pacific Islander, 112 (9.7%) from other races, and 38 (3.3%) from two or more races. Hispanic or Latino of any race were 232 people (20.1%).

The whole population lived in households, no one lived in non-institutionalized group quarters and no one was institutionalized.

There were 414 households, 157 (37.9%) had children under the age of 18 living in them, 191 (46.1%) were opposite-sex married couples living together, 66 (15.9%) had a female householder with no husband present, 34 (8.2%) had a male householder with no wife present. There were 50 (12.1%) unmarried opposite-sex partnerships, and 2 (0.5%) same-sex married couples or partnerships. 91 households (22.0%) were one person and 33 (8.0%) had someone living alone who was 65 or older. The average household size was 2.79. There were 291 families (70.3% of households); the average family size was 3.20.

The age distribution was 306 people (26.5%) under the age of 18, 112 people (9.7%) aged 18 to 24, 252 people (21.8%) aged 25 to 44, 349 people (30.2%) aged 45 to 64, and 135 people (11.7%) who were 65 or older. The median age was 39.4 years. For every 100 females, there were 101.7 males. For every 100 females age 18 and over, there were 103.4 males.

There were 466 housing units at an average density of 310.3 per square mile, of the occupied units 268 (64.7%) were owner-occupied and 146 (35.3%) were rented. The homeowner vacancy rate was 1.8%; the rental vacancy rate was 9.8%. 704 people (61.0% of the population) lived in owner-occupied housing units and 450 people (39.0%) lived in rental housing units.

== Government misconduct ==
Maricopa Fire Department was established in 1910 with Chief F. W. Ball serving as the first fire chief. Maricopa Hospital opened on April 22, 1911, and the city was incorporated on July 25, 1911. Gary Biggerstaff was the chief of police when budget problems forced the city to close its police department in 1998. The Kern County Sheriff's Department provided police services to the citizens of Maricopa from 1998 until 2006 when the city reopened its police department in the old building.

As reported in the Los Angeles Times on July 4, 2011, the Maricopa Police Department has become embroiled in a local controversy playing out through large signs posted on the city's main thoroughfare. The police have been accused of racial profiling and "over-enforcement" regarding traffic violations and frequent towing of vehicles driven by drivers without proof of insurance or with license or license plate infractions. In mid-2011, American Civil Liberties Union lawyer Jennie Pasquarella is quoted as saying, "Maricopa has been a shining example of impoundments gone wrong," and "They're essentially creating a racket to steal people's cars."

The damage done during this era to the city of Maricopa's reputation persists, as recently as May 2022, Reason magazine reported that, "...the town of Maricopa gained a reputation for targeting drivers, especially farm workers, in the hopes that they'd be undocumented immigrants, thus allowing the small police department to impound their cars without much fuss."

== Transportation ==
Maricopa lies at the junction of Route 166 and Route 33.

The City of Taft operates Taft-Maricopa Area Transit, with buses serving Taft and Maricopa.
