= Toro Canyon, California =

Toro Canyon
- Unincorporated Community; Census Designated Place
- Location in Santa Barbara County and the state of California
- Coordinates: 34°25′6″N 119°33′47″W
- Country: United States
- State: California
- County: Santa Barbara

Government
  - State Senator: Monique Limón (D)
  - CA Assembly: Gregg Hart (D)
  - U. S. Congress: Salud Carbajal (D)

Area
  - Total: 13.790 sq mi (35.716 km^{2})
  - Land: 9.387 sq mi (24.313 km^{2})
  - Water: 4.403 sq mi (11.403 km^{2}) 31.93%
- Elevation: 49 ft (15 m)

Population (2020)
  - Total: 1,835
  - Density: 196/sq mi (75.5/km^{2})
- Time zone: UTC-8 (PST)
  - Summer (DST): UTC-7 (PDT)
- ZIP code: 93013
- Area code: 805
- FIPS code: 06-79529
- GNIS feature ID: 1853418

Toro Canyon (Toro, Spanish for "bull") is a census-designated place (CDP) in Santa Barbara County, California, United States. The population was 1,835 at the 2020 census, up from 1,508 at the 2010 census.

== Geography ==
Toro Canyon is bounded on the west by Montecito and Summerland, on the east and southeast by Carpinteria, on the north by Los Padres National Forest, and on the south by the Pacific Ocean.

According to the United States Census Bureau, the CDP has a total area of 13.8 square miles (36 km^{2}), of which 9.4 square miles (24 km^{2}), or 68.07%, is land and 4.4 square miles (11 km^{2}), or 31.93%, is water.

== Demographics ==
Historical population
Census	Pop.	Note	%±
2000	1,697		—
2010	1,508		−11.1%
2020	1,835		21.7%
U.S. Decennial Census; 1860–1870 1880-1890; 1900 1910 1920; 1930 1940 1950; 1960 1970 1980; 1990 2000 2010; 2020

Toro Canyon first appeared as a census designated place in the 2000 U.S. census.

=== Racial and ethnic composition ===
Toro Canyon CDP, California – Racial and ethnic composition Note: the US Census treats Hispanic/Latino as an ethnic category. This table excludes Latinos from the racial categories and assigns them to a separate category. Hispanics/Latinos may be of any race.
Race / Ethnicity (NH = Non-Hispanic)	Pop 2000	Pop 2010	Pop 2020	% 2000	% 2010	% 2020
White alone (NH)	1,363	1,175	1,342	80.32%	77.92%	73.13%
Black or African American alone (NH)	5	7	16	0.29%	0.46%	0.87%
Native American or Alaska Native alone (NH)	3	0	0	0.18%	0.00%	0.00%
Asian alone (NH)	23	13	42	1.36%	0.86%	2.29%
Native Hawaiian or Pacific Islander alone (NH)	3	1	2	0.18%	0.07%	0.11%
Other race alone (NH)	1	5	12	0.06%	0.33%	0.65%
Mixed race or Multiracial (NH)	23	14	74	1.36%	0.93%	4.03%
Hispanic or Latino (any race)	276	293	347	16.26%	19.43%	18.91%
Total	1,697	1,508	1,835	100.00%	100.00%	100.00%

=== 2020 census ===
As of the 2020 census, Toro Canyon had a population of 1,835. The population density was 195.5 inhabitants per square mile (75.5/km^{2}). The racial makeup of Toro Canyon was 1,407 (76.7%) White, 16 (0.9%) African American, 7 (0.4%) Native American, 43 (2.3%) Asian, 2 (0.1%) Pacific Islander, 105 (5.7%) from other races, and 255 (13.9%) from two or more races. Hispanic or Latino of any race were 347 persons (18.9%).

The census reported that 1,818 people (99.1% of the population) lived in households, 17 (0.9%) lived in non-institutionalized group quarters, and no one was institutionalized. Of residents, 57.7% lived in urban areas and 42.3% lived in rural areas.

There were 767 households, out of which 142 (18.5%) had children under the age of 18 living in them, 437 (57.0%) were married-couple households, 45 (5.9%) were cohabiting couple households, 172 (22.4%) had a female householder with no partner present, and 113 (14.7%) had a male householder with no partner present. 205 households (26.7%) were one person, and 117 (15.3%) were one person aged 65 or older. The average household size was 2.37. There were 509 families (66.4% of all households).

The age distribution was 248 people (13.5%) under the age of 18, 105 people (5.7%) aged 18 to 24, 371 people (20.2%) aged 25 to 44, 467 people (25.4%) aged 45 to 64, and 644 people (35.1%) who were 65 years of age or older. The median age was 55.8 years. For every 100 females, there were 93.0 males, and for every 100 females age 18 and over there were 92.6 males.

There were 1,026 housing units at an average density of 109.3 units per square mile (42.2 units/km^{2}), of which 767 (74.8%) were occupied. Of these, 508 (66.2%) were owner-occupied, and 259 (33.8%) were occupied by renters. The homeowner vacancy rate was 3.1%, and the rental vacancy rate was 9.4%.

=== Income and poverty ===
In 2023, the US Census Bureau estimated that the median household income was $177,879, and the per capita income was $130,862. About 0.0% of families and 4.7% of the population were below the poverty line.

=== 2010 census ===
The 2010 United States census reported that Toro Canyon had a population of 1,508. The population density was 422.0 inhabitants per square mile (162.9/km^{2}). The racial makeup of Toro Canyon was 1,388 (92.0%) White, 7 (0.5%) African American, 7 (0.5%) Native American, 14 (0.9%) Asian, 1 (0.1%) Pacific Islander, 73 (4.8%) from other races, and 18 (1.2%) from two or more races. Hispanic or Latino of any race were 293 persons (19.4%).

The Census reported that 1,508 people (100% of the population) lived in households, 0 (0%) lived in non-institutionalized group quarters, and 0 (0%) were institutionalized.

There were 620 households, out of which 138 (22.3%) had children under the age of 18 living in them, 352 (56.8%) were opposite-sex married couples living together, 49 (7.9%) had a female householder with no husband present, 15 (2.4%) had a male householder with no wife present. There were 32 (5.2%) unmarried opposite-sex partnerships, and 8 (1.3%) same-sex married couples or partnerships. 153 households (24.7%) were made up of individuals, and 71 (11.5%) had someone living alone who was 65 years of age or older. The average household size was 2.43. There were 416 families (67.1% of all households); the average family size was 2.87.

The population was spread out, with 253 people (16.8%) under the age of 18, 107 people (7.1%) aged 18 to 24, 290 people (19.2%) aged 25 to 44, 525 people (34.8%) aged 45 to 64, and 333 people (22.1%) who were 65 years of age or older. The median age was 50.2 years. For every 100 females, there were 91.1 males. For every 100 females age 18 and over, there were 93.1 males.

There were 804 housing units at an average density of 225.0 per square mile (86.9/km^{2}), of which 440 (71.0%) were owner-occupied, and 180 (29.0%) were occupied by renters. The homeowner vacancy rate was 1.6%; the rental vacancy rate was 6.6%. 1,088 people (72.1% of the population) lived in owner-occupied housing units and 420 people (27.9%) lived in rental housing units.
