= Takasugi =

Takasugi (written: 高杉) is a Japanese surname meaning "tall cedar". Notable people with the surname include:

- Takasugi Shinsaku (1839–1867), samurai
- Mahiro Takasugi (born 1996), Japanese actor
- Nao Takasugi (1922–2009), American politician
- Robert Mitsuhiro Takasugi (1930–2009), United States federal judge of Japanese descent
- Ryota Takasugi (born 1984), Japanese football player
- Sanae Takasugi (高杉 早苗, 1918–1995), Japanese actress
- Satomi Takasugi (born 1985), Japanese pop singer, race queen, and former gravure idol
- Tricia Takasugi (born 1961), Japanese-American general assignment reporter
