= Richard Lyman =

Richard Lyman may refer to:

- Richard M. Lyman (1893–1978), American politician
- Richard R. Lyman (1870–1963), American apostle of The Church of Jesus Christ of Latter-day Saints
- Richard Wall Lyman (1923–2012), American academic, president of Stanford University

== See also ==
- Richard Lyman Bushman (born 1931), American historian
