= Rex Cunningham =

Rex Cunningham may refer to:

- Rex Cunningham (rugby league), New Zealand rugby league player
- Rex M. Cunningham, member of the California State Assembly
