= Stanley Tomlinson =

Stanley Tomlinson may refer to:

- Stanley T. Tomlinson, member of the California State Assembly
- Stanley Tomlinson (diplomat), British diplomat
