= Julian Beck (judge) =

American judge (1905–1992)

Judge of the Los Angeles County Superior Court
- In office 1953–1975
- Appointed by: Pat Brown

Minority Leader of the California Assembly
- In office 1948–1952
- Preceded by: John B. Cooke
- Succeeded by: Vincent Thomas

Member of the California State Assembly from the 41 district
- In office January 4, 1943 – September 25, 1953
- Preceded by: Rodney L. Turner
- Succeeded by: Allen Miller

Personal details
- Born: 13 May 1905 Philadelphia, Pennsylvania, U.S.
- Died: August 18, 1992 (aged 87) San Diego, California, U.S.
- Party: Democratic
- Spouse: Maude Marie Carlisle
- Children: 2
- Education: UCLA (A.B. Economics, 1929); USC (M.A. History, 1935); Loyola University (LL.B., 1935)
- Occupation: Educator · Legislator · Judge

Julian Beck (May 13, 1905 – August 18, 1992) was an American educator, legislator, and jurist. He served for many years in the California legislature and on the Los Angeles County Superior Court.

== Early life and education ==
Julian Beck was born in Philadelphia on May 13, 1905. and earned a bachelor's degree in economics from the University of California, Los Angeles (UCLA) in 1929. He later obtained a master's degree in history from the University of Southern California (USC) in 1935. In the same year, he completed his legal education, receiving a law degree from Loyola University.

== Career ==
Beck began his career in public service as a business and social studies teacher in the Los Angeles City High School District during the 1930s and early 1940s. He was also an instructor for the American Institute of Banking. He later entered politics and was elected to the California Assembly. He represented the 41st District, which at that time covered parts of the San Fernando Valley, from 1943 to 1953. While serving in the Assembly, Beck participated in selecting the site and securing land for San Fernando Valley State College, which later became California State University, Northridge (CSUN). He subsequently served as chairman of the college's advisory board for 16 years.

In the California State Assembly, Beck was minority leader from 1948 to 1952 and was a member of the Assembly Education Committee throughout his five terms.

In 1953, Governor Earl Warren appointed Beck to the Los Angeles Municipal Court, where he worked until 1959. That year, he became legislative secretary to Governor Pat Brown. Brown later appointed him to the Los Angeles Superior Court, where Beck presided over cases until his retirement in 1975. In 1961, he transferred to the Superior Court in San Fernando, a court he had helped establish through legislation in 1947.

As a Superior Court judge in Los Angeles County, Beck oversaw a wide variety of criminal and civil court cases involving both celebrities and ordinary citizens, including murder trials, public intoxication (Merle Travis), jaywalking (Liberace), divorce proceedings (Jerry Lambert), leash law violations (Lou Costello), speeding (Ina Ray Hutton and Troy Donahue), personal injury lawsuits (Bobby Van and Judy Garland), assault and battery (Horace Heidt), drunk driving (Gordon MacRae), contested wills, sexual harassment, medical malpractice, unemployment fraud, filicide, and Thalidomide-related birth defect lawsuits.

Beck retired on April 30, 1975, just two weeks before his 70th birthday, after 32 years of public service on the bench and in the legislature.

== Other positions ==
Before his legislative and judicial career, Beck held a variety of positions, including working as a Pacific Electric Railway conductor, a Metro-Goldwyn-Mayer stenographer, a deputy County clerk, a court bailiff, a high school teacher, and a private law practice in the San Fernando Valley.

== Personal life ==
Beck was married to Maude Marie Carlisle for nearly 40 years. Together, they had two daughters.

== Later life and death ==
After retiring from the bench, Beck relocated to San Diego, where he lived for several years until his death on August 18, 1992.

== Legacy ==
Beck's archives are stored in Special Collections and Archives in the University Library at California State University, Northridge.
