= Santa Barbara County, California =

County in California, United States

Coordinates: 34.54°N 120.03°W

Santa Barbara County
- County
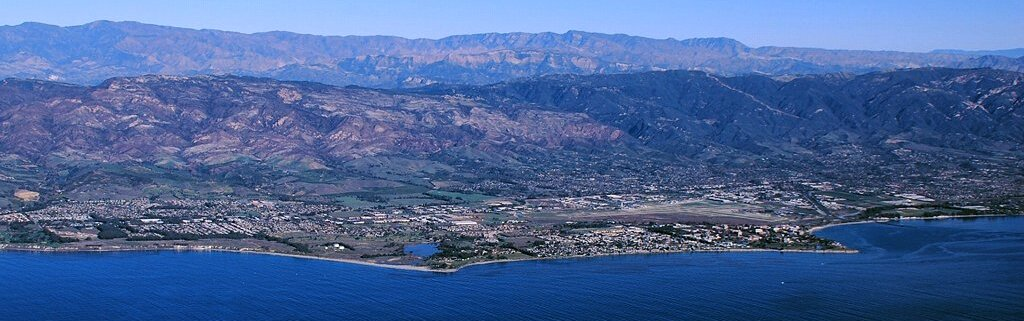
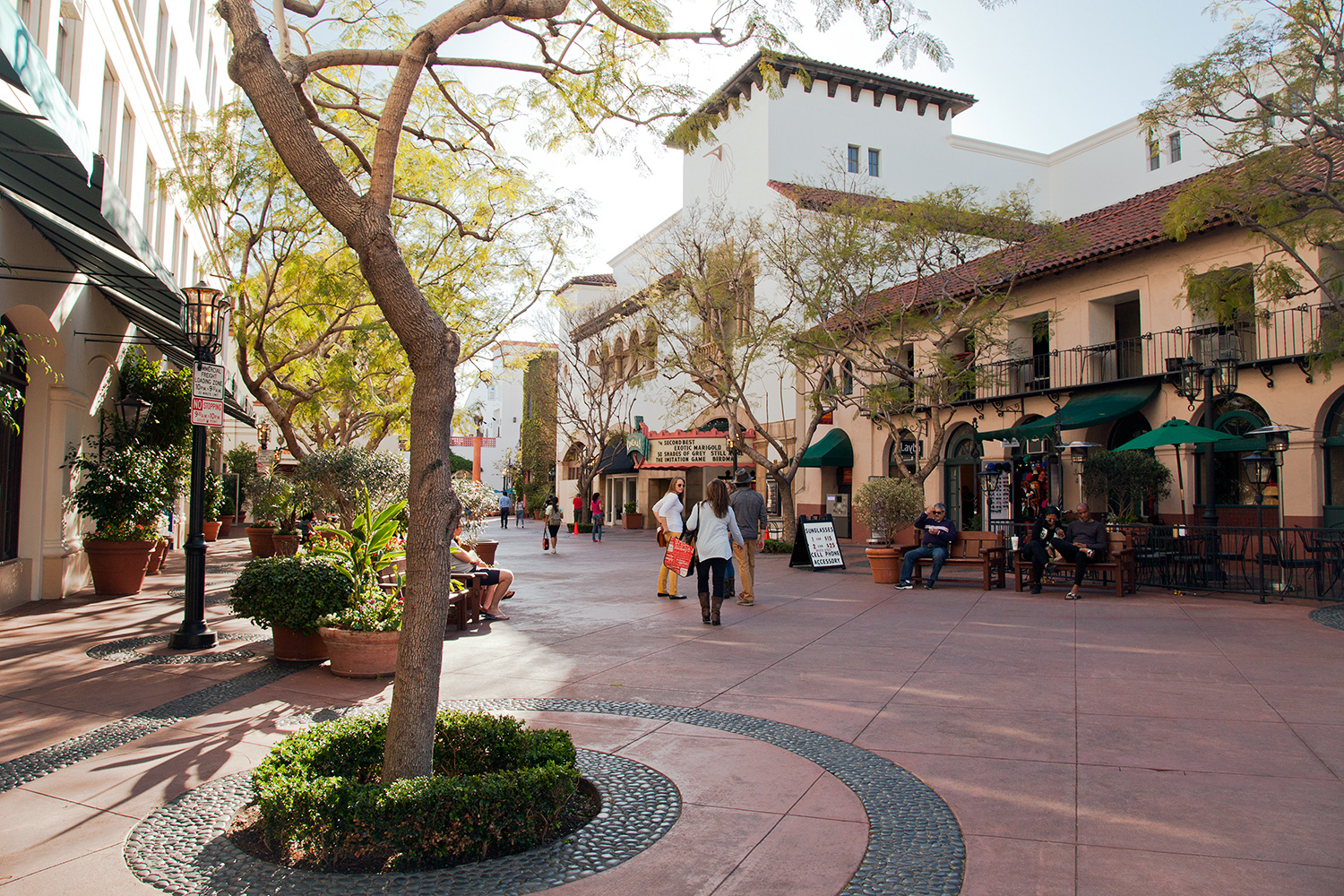
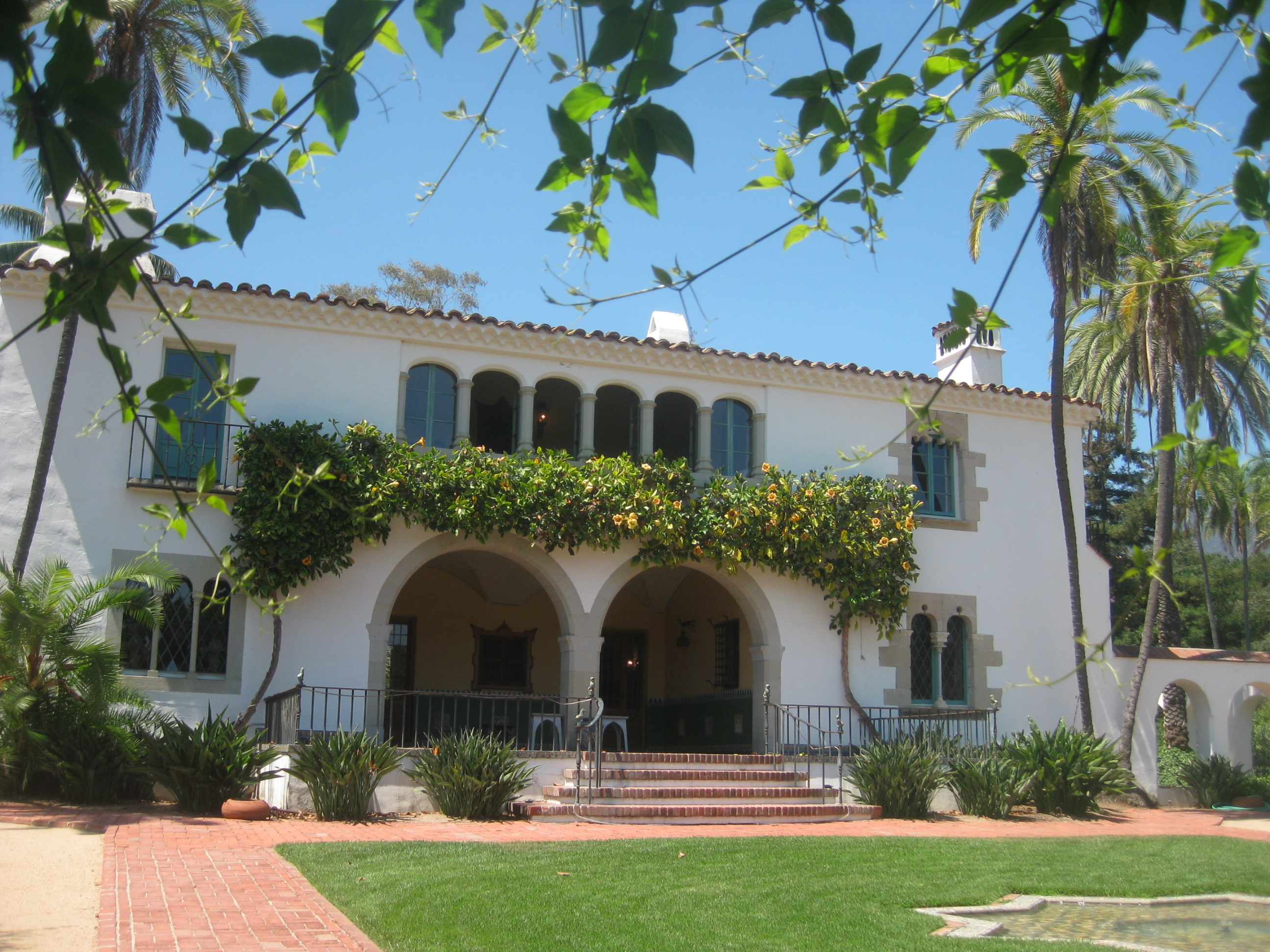
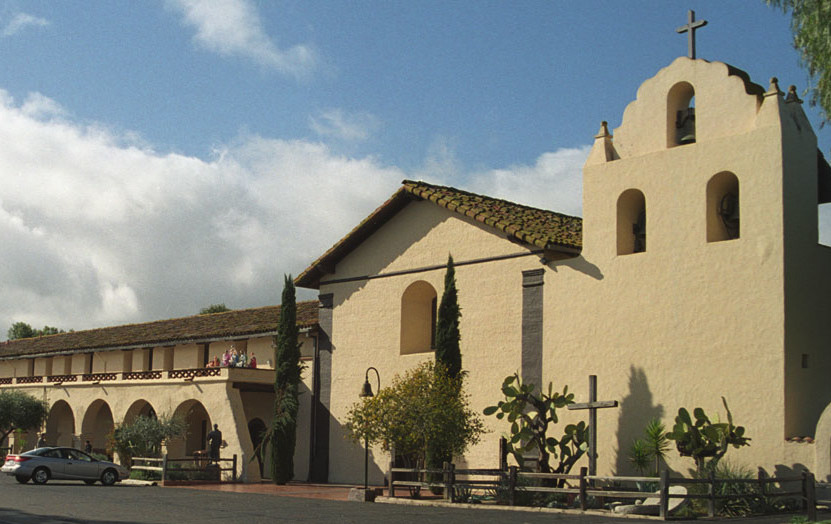
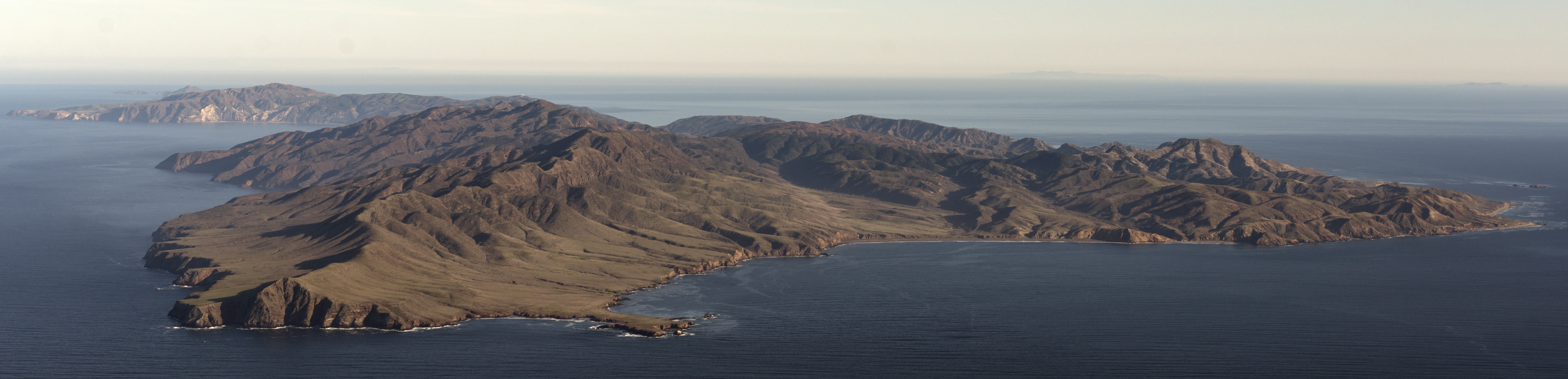
- Goleta on the Central Coast Santa Barbara Montecito Lompoc Solvang Santa Cruz Island in the Channel Islands

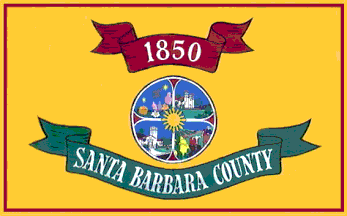
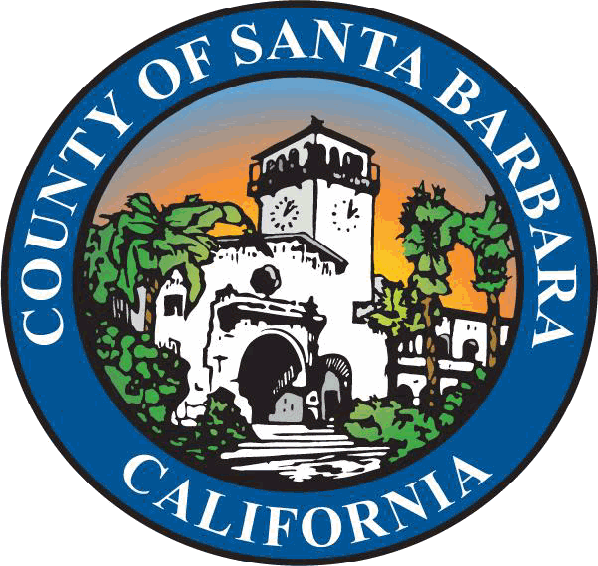
- Flag Seal
- Interactive map of Santa Barbara County
- Location in the state of California
- Country: United States
- State: California
- Region: California Central Coast
- Incorporated: February 18, 1850
- Named for: Saint Barbara
- County seat: Santa Barbara
- Largest city: Santa Maria (population); Santa Barbara (area)

Government
  - Type: Council–CEO
  - Body: Board of Supervisors
  - Chair: Bob Nelson
  - Vice Chair: Joan Hartmann
  - Board of Supervisors: Supervisors: Roy Lee; Laura Capps; Joan Hartmann; Bob Nelson; Steve Lavagnino
  - County executive officer: Mona Miyasato

Area
  - Total: 3,789 sq mi (9,810 km^{2})
  - Land: 2,735 sq mi (7,080 km^{2})
  - Water: 1,054 sq mi (2,730 km^{2}) 27.8%
- Highest elevation: 6,803 ft (2,074 m)

Population (2020)
  - Total: 448,229
  - Estimate (2025): 442,065 ▼
  - Density: 163.9/sq mi (63.28/km^{2})

GDP
  - Total: $36.081 billion (2022)
- Time zone: UTC−8 (Pacific Time Zone)
  - Summer (DST): UTC−7 (Pacific Daylight Time)
- Area codes: 661, 805/820
- Congressional district: 24th
- Website: countyofsb.org

Santa Barbara County, officially the County of Santa Barbara, is a southern county in the U.S. state of California. As of the 2020 United States census, the population was 448,229. The county seat is Santa Barbara, and the largest city in the county is Santa Maria.

Santa Barbara County comprises the Santa Maria-Santa Barbara, CA Metropolitan Statistical Area. Santa Barbara is located in Southern California. Mainstays of the county's economy include engineering, resource extraction (particularly petroleum extraction and diatomaceous earth mining), winemaking, agriculture, and education. The software development and tourism industries are important employers in the southern part of the county.

== History ==
The Santa Barbara County area, including the Northern Channel Islands, was first settled by Native Americans at least 13,000 years ago. Evidence for a Paleoindian presence has been found in the form of a fluted Clovis-like point found in the 1980s along the western Santa Barbara Coast, as well as the remains of Arlington Springs Man found on Santa Rosa Island in the 1960s. For thousands of years, the area was home to the Chumash tribe of Native Americans, hunter-gatherers who lived along the coast and in interior valleys leaving rock art in many locations, including Painted Cave.

Europeans first contacted the Chumash in AD 1542, when three Spanish ships under the command of Juan Rodríguez Cabrillo explored the area. The Santa Barbara Channel received its name from Spanish explorer Sebastián Vizcaíno when he sailed along the California coast in 1602; his ships entered the channel on December 4, the day of the feast of Santa Barbara. Spanish ships associated with the Manila Galleon trade probably made emergency stops along the coast during the next 167 years, but no permanent settlements were established.

The first land expedition to explore California, led by Gaspar de Portolà explored the coastal area in 1769, on its way to Monterey Bay. The party traveled the same route on the return to San Diego in January 1770. That same year, a second expedition to Monterey again passed through the area. The DeAnza expeditions of 1774–76 followed Portola's trail.

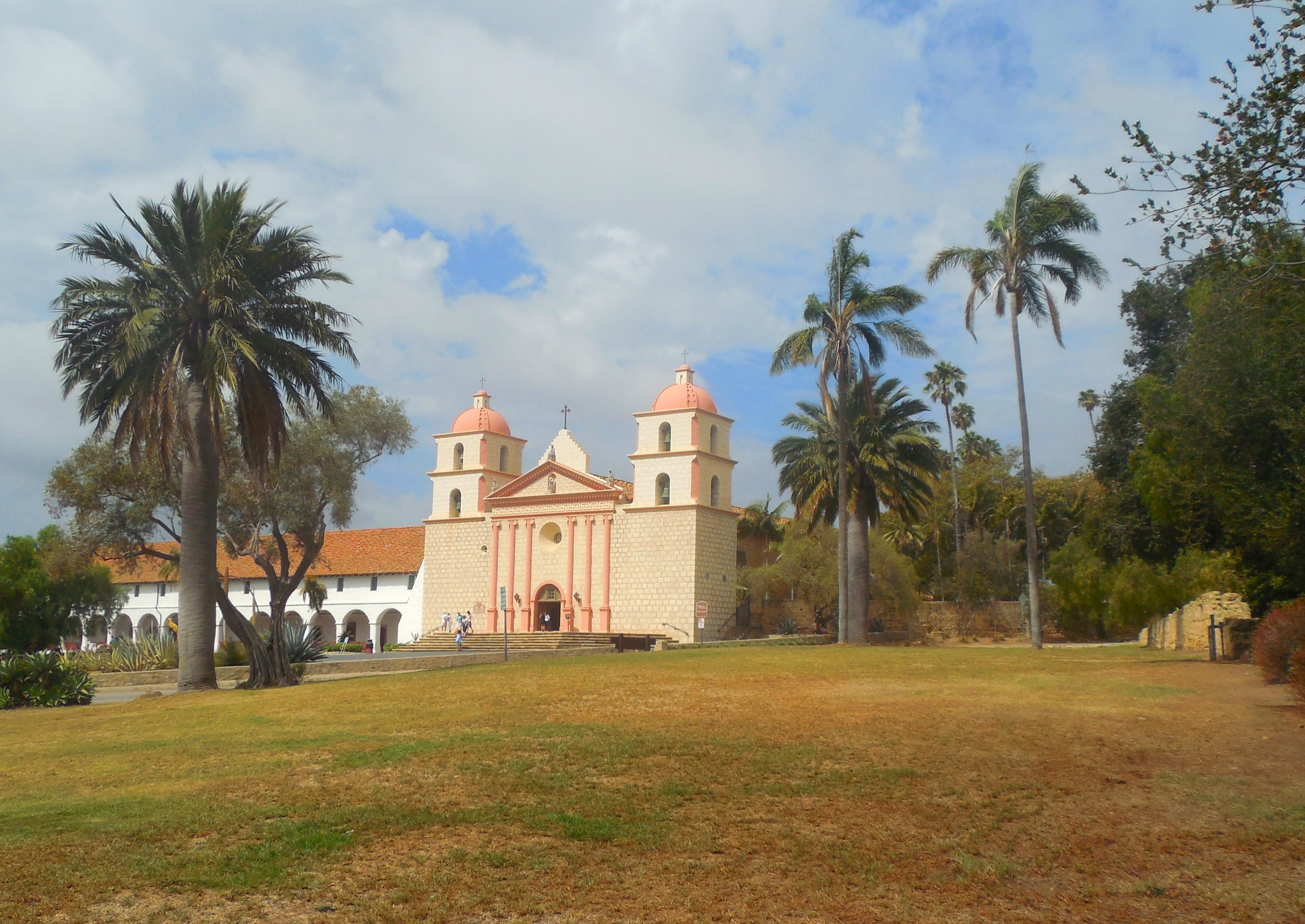
Mission Santa Barbara from Mission Park, Santa Barbara

The Presidio of Santa Barbara was established in 1782 (4th of 5 in California), followed by Mission Santa Barbara in 1786 – both in what is now the city of Santa Barbara. The presidio and mission kept Vizcaino's denomination, as did the later city and county – a common practice which has preserved the names of many of the 21 California Missions. Other missions in Santa Barbara County are located in Santa Ynez and Lompoc.

European contacts had devastating effects on the Chumash people, including a series of disease epidemics that drastically reduced Chumash population. The Chumash survived, however, and thousands of Chumash descendants still live in the Santa Barbara area or surrounding counties. A tribal homeland was established in 1901, the Santa Ynez Reservation.

Following the Mexican secularization of the missions in the 1830s, the mission pasture lands were mostly broken up into large ranchos and granted mainly to prominent local citizens who already lived in the area. 604 of these land grants were later confirmed by the state of California, with 36 in Santa Barbara County.

Santa Barbara County was one of the 27 original counties of California, formed in 1850 at the time of statehood. The county's territory was later divided to create Ventura County in 1873.

== Geography ==
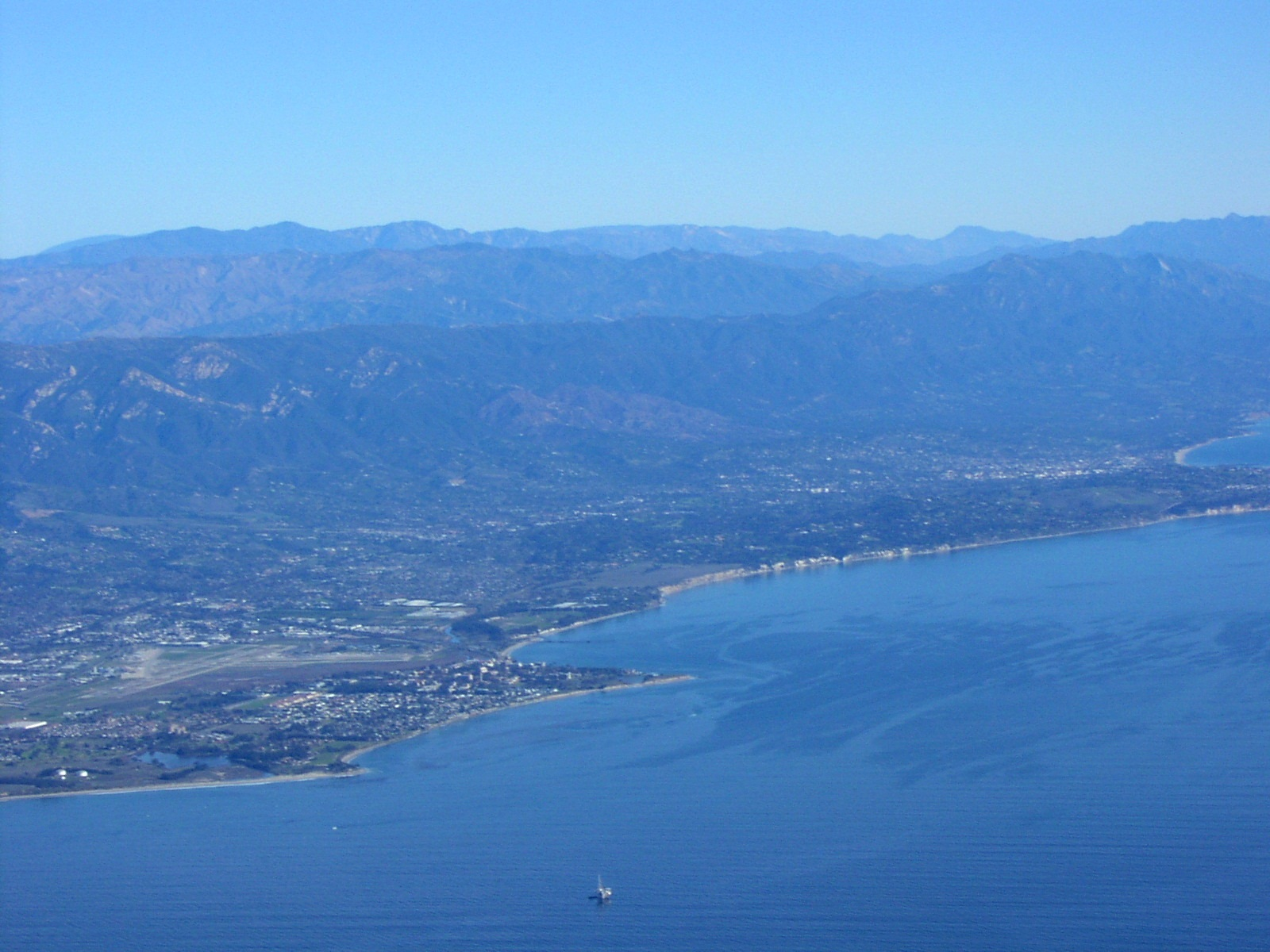
South Coast of Santa Barbara County, view looking northeast, showing, from left to right, Isla Vista, Goleta, Hope Ranch, Santa Barbara. All the mountains except for the most distant in the right rear are in Santa Barbara County.

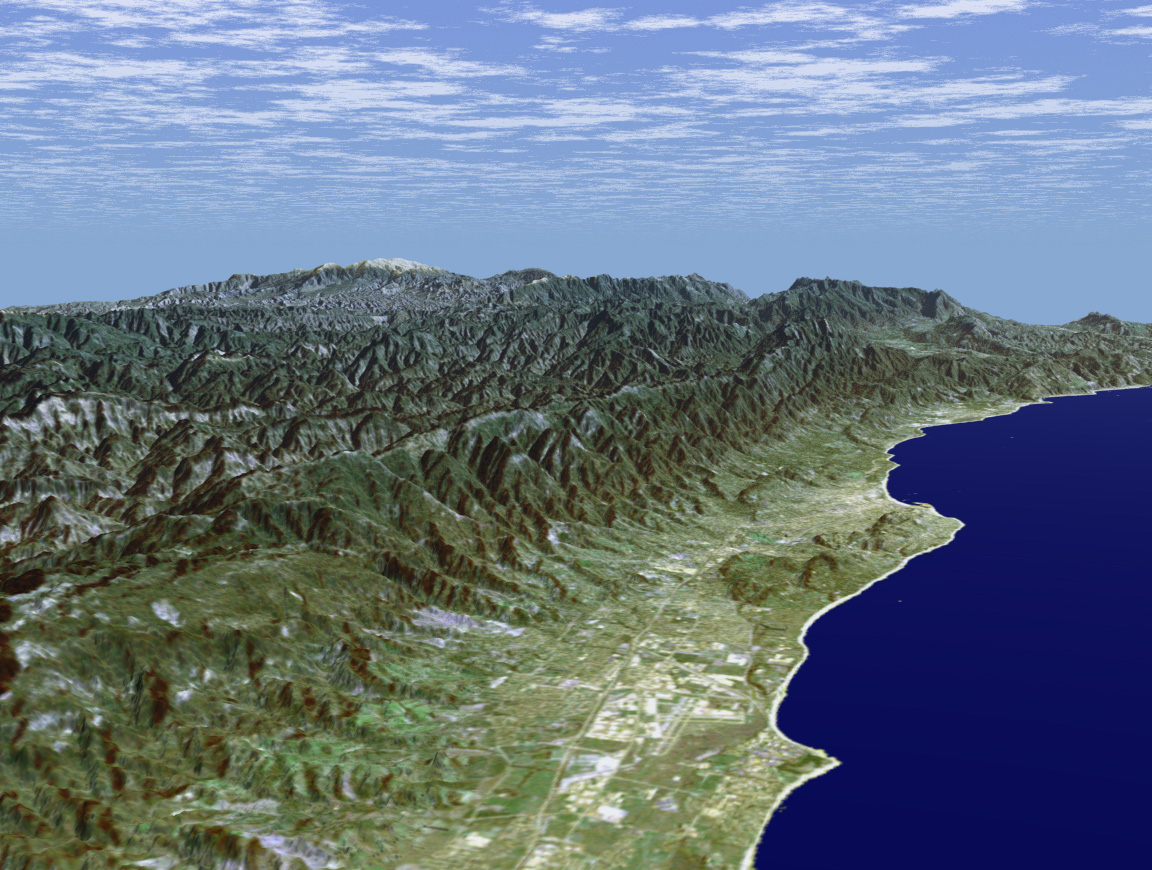
Coast of Santa Barbara and rugged back country. Courtesy: NASA Earth Explorer.

According to the U.S. Census Bureau, the county has a total area of 3,789 square miles (9,810 km^{2}), of which 2,735 square miles (7,080 km^{2}) is land and 1,054 square miles (2,730 km^{2}) (27.8%) is water. Four of the Channel Islands – San Miguel Island, Santa Cruz Island, Santa Rosa Island and Santa Barbara Island – are in Santa Barbara County. They form the largest part of the Channel Islands National Park (which also includes Anacapa Island in Ventura County).

Santa Barbara County has a mountainous interior abutting several coastal plains on the west and south coasts of the county. The largest concentration of population is on the southern coastal plain, referred to as the "south coast" – meaning the part of the county south of the Santa Ynez Mountains. This region includes the cities of Santa Barbara, Goleta, and Carpinteria, as well as the unincorporated areas of Hope Ranch, Summerland, Mission Canyon, Montecito, and Isla Vista, along with stretches of unincorporated area such as Noleta. The Gaviota Coast is a rural coastline north of Goleta. This last undeveloped stretch of Southern California coastline consists of dramatic bluffs, isolated beaches and terraced grasslands. North of the Santa Ynez range in the Santa Ynez Valley are the towns of Solvang, Buellton, and Lompoc; the unincorporated towns of Santa Ynez, Los Olivos and Ballard; the unincorporated areas of Mission Hills and Vandenberg Village; and Vandenberg Space Force Base, where the Santa Ynez River flows out to the sea. North of the Santa Ynez Valley are the cities of Santa Maria and Guadalupe, and the unincorporated towns of Orcutt, Los Alamos, Casmalia, Garey, and Sisquoc. In the extreme northeastern portion of the county are the small cities of New Cuyama, Cuyama, and Ventucopa. As of January 1, 2006, Santa Maria has become the largest city in Santa Barbara County.

The principal mountain ranges of the county are the Santa Ynez Mountains in the south, and the San Rafael Mountains and Sierra Madre Mountains in the interior and northeast. Most of the mountainous area is within the Los Padres National Forest, and includes two wilderness areas: the San Rafael Wilderness and the Dick Smith Wilderness. The highest elevation in the county is 6,820 feet (2,080 m) at Big Pine Mountain in the San Rafaels.

North of the mountains is the arid and sparsely populated Cuyama Valley, portions of which are in San Luis Obispo and Ventura Counties. Oil production, ranching, and agriculture dominate the land use in the privately owned parts of the Cuyama Valley; the Los Padres National Forest is adjacent to the south, and regions to the north and northeast are owned by the Bureau of Land Management and the Nature Conservancy.

=== Channel Islands ===
The four Channel Islands in Santa Barbara County are Santa Barbara Island, San Miguel Island, Santa Rosa Island, and the large Santa Cruz Island. All of them contain native and endemic wildlife, like the island oak and Torrey Pine. All four have the deer mouse living on them, the three latter, the island fox, and the two latter, the island spotted skunk. There used to be skunks on San Miguel Island, but due to predation from marine life, birds, and foxes, the San Miguel Island skunk has gone extinct.

=== Climate ===
Santa Barbara County has a mild warm-summer Mediterranean climate. Along the coast, temperatures rarely exceed 100 °F (38 °C) in the summer, but rarely dip below freezing in winter. In the interior, however, summertime temperatures can soar over 100 °F (38 °C). Above 2,000 feet (610 meters), temperatures can frequently fall below freezing during the winter months. The area experiences nearly all of its rainfall during the winter months, and rarely sees any rain at all during the summer months.

The area's dry, warm summers often lead to high wildfire danger in the fall. An example of this is the massive Thomas Fire, which started in Ventura County and rapidly spread into southern Santa Barbara County in December 2017. At the time, the fire was the largest wildfire ever to burn in California in terms of geographical size, but was topped only eight months later in the Mendocino Complex Fire in northern California. Heavy rainfall occurred the following January, causing massive mudslides and debris flows from the steep, fire-denuded hillsides. The community of Montecito was especially hard-hit. As of February 3, 2018, 21 are known dead and 2 are still missing.

=== Air quality ===
Air quality in the county, unlike much of southern California, is generally good because of the prevailing winds off of the Pacific Ocean. The county is in attainment of federal standards for ozone and particulate matter. In July 2020 the county was designated as attainment for the state ozone standard, but it still does not attain the state PM10 standard. the county's location plus the cities near it establishes the area's climate and meteorology influence how the pollution are diffused.

=== Adjacent counties ===
- San Luis Obispo County (North).
- Kern County (Northeast).
- Ventura County (Southeast).

=== National protected areas ===
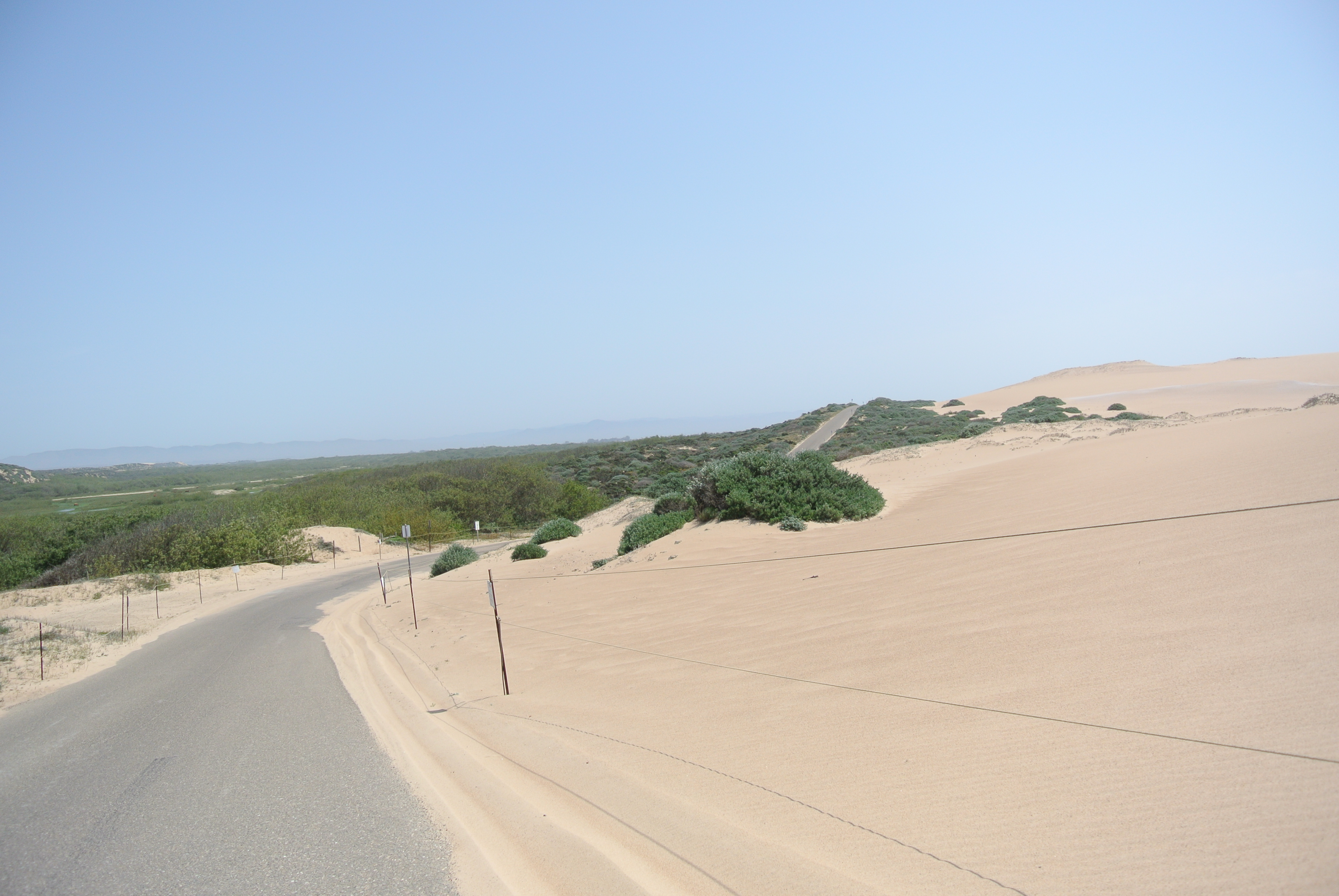
Transition zone (back dunes) in Guadalupe-Nipomo Dunes National Wildlife Refuge

- Burton Mesa Ecological Reserve
- Channel Islands National Park (part)
- Chumash Heritage National Marine Sanctuary
- Guadalupe-Nipomo Dunes National Wildlife Refuge (part)
- Los Padres National Forest (part)

== Demographics ==
Historical population
Census	Pop.	Note	%±
1850	1,185		—
1860	3,543		199.0%
1870	7,784		119.7%
1880	9,513		22.2%
1890	15,754		65.6%
1900	18,934		20.2%
1910	27,738		46.5%
1920	41,097		48.2%
1930	65,167		58.6%
1940	70,555		8.3%
1950	98,220		39.2%
1960	168,962		72.0%
1970	264,324		56.4%
1980	298,694		13.0%
1990	369,608		23.7%
2000	399,347		8.0%
2010	423,895		6.1%
2020	448,229		5.7%
2025 (est.)	442,065	▼	−1.4%
U.S. Decennial Census; 1790–1960 1900–1990; 1990–2000 22010 2020

=== 2020 census ===
As of the 2020 census, the county had a population of 448,229. The median age was 35.7 years. 21.7% of residents were under the age of 18 and 16.7% of residents were 65 years of age or older. For every 100 females there were 98.2 males, and for every 100 females age 18 and over there were 96.5 males age 18 and over.

The racial makeup of the county was 50.1% White, 1.6% Black or African American, 2.1% American Indian and Alaska Native, 5.9% Asian, 0.2% Native Hawaiian and Pacific Islander, 22.2% from some other race, and 17.8% from two or more races. Hispanic or Latino residents of any race comprised 47.0% of the population.

94.4% of residents lived in urban areas, while 5.6% lived in rural areas.

There were 148,353 households in the county, of which 32.6% had children under the age of 18 living with them and 27.1% had a female householder with no spouse or partner present. About 24.0% of all households were made up of individuals and 11.7% had someone living alone who was 65 years of age or older.

There were 158,279 housing units, of which 6.3% were vacant. Among occupied housing units, 52.4% were owner-occupied and 47.6% were renter-occupied. The homeowner vacancy rate was 1.0% and the rental vacancy rate was 3.3%.

=== Racial and ethnic composition ===
Santa Barbara County, California – Racial and ethnic composition Note: the US Census treats Hispanic/Latino as an ethnic category. This table excludes Latinos from the racial categories and assigns them to a separate category. Hispanics/Latinos may be of any race.
Race / Ethnicity (NH = Non-Hispanic)	Pop 1980	Pop 1990	Pop 2000	Pop 2010	Pop 2020	% 1980	% 1990	% 2000	% 2010	% 2020
White alone (NH)	223,397	244,309	227,083	203,122	184,746	74.79%	66.10%	56.86%	47.92%	41.22%
Black or African American alone (NH)	7,554	9,379	8,385	7,242	6,467	2.53%	2.54%	2.10%	1.71%	1.44%
Native American or Alaska Native alone (NH)	2,702	2,126	2,135	1,843	1,731	0.90%	0.58%	0.53%	0.43%	0.39%
Asian alone (NH)	8,344	15,050	15,713	19,591	25,378	2.79%	4.07%	3.93%	4.62%	5.66%
Native Hawaiian or Pacific Islander alone (NH)	x	x	589	680	542	x	x	0.15%	0.16%	0.12%
Other race alone (NH)	1,341	545	585	790	2,378	0.45%	0.15%	0.15%	0.19%	0.53%
Mixed race or Multiracial (NH)	x	x	8,189	8,940	16,403	x	x	2.05%	2.11%	3.66%
Hispanic or Latino (any race)	55,356	98,199	136,668	181,687	210,584	18.53%	26.57%	34.22%	42.86%	46.98%
Total	298,694	369,608	399,347	423,895	448,229	100.00%	100.00%	100.00%	100.00%	100.00%

=== American Community Survey 2025 data ===
The United States Census Bureau estimated that in 2025, Santa Barbara County’s population was 442.065. It was also estimated that the county's population was 39,29% Non-Hispanic White, 49,52% Hispanic or Latino, 1,45% Non-Hispanic Black, 6,02% Asian, 0,39% Native American, 0,14% Pacific Islander, and 3,20% Multiracial.

Total	Population	Percentage
Non-Hispanic White	173.690	39,29%
Hispanic or Latino	218.896	49,52%
Non-Hispanic Black	6.396	1,45%
Asian	26.598	6,02%
Native American	1.708	0,39%
Pacific Islander	632	0,14%
Non-Hispanic Multiracial	14.145	3,20%

=== 2010 census ===
The 2010 United States census reported that Santa Barbara County had a population of 423,895. The ethnic makeup of Santa Barbara County was 295,124 (69.6%) White, 8,513 (2.0%) African American, 5,485 (1.3%) Native American, 20,665 (4.9%) Asian (1.6% Filipino, 1.0% Chinese, 0.5% Japanese, 0.5% Korean, 0.3% Vietnamese, 0.4% Indian), 806 (0.2%) Pacific Islander, 73,860 (17.4%) from other races, and 19,442 (4.6%) from two or more races. There were 181,687 residents of Hispanic or Latino origin, of any race (42.9%); 38.5% of the population was of Mexican heritage, 0.4% Salvadoran, 0.4% Guatemalan, and 0.3% Puerto Rican descent.

Population reported at 2010 United States census
The County	Total; Population	White	African; American	Native; American	Asian	Pacific; Islander	other races	two or more races	Hispanic or Latino (of any race)
Santa Barbara County	423,895	295,124	8,513	5,485	20,665	806	73,860	19,442	181,687
Incorporated cities	Total; Population	White	African; American	Native; American	Asian	Pacific; Islander	other races	two or more races	Hispanic or Latino (of any race)
Buellton	4,828	3,912	37	76	137	5	424	237	1,451
Carpinteria	13,040	9,348	109	144	296	15	2,599	529	6,351
Goleta	29,888	20,833	469	283	2,728	26	4,182	1,367	9,824
Guadalupe	7,080	3,395	74	103	279	5	2,783	441	6,103
Lompoc	42,434	25,950	2,432	750	1,615	186	9,020	2,481	21,557
Santa Barbara	88,410	66,411	1,420	892	3,062	116	13,032	3,477	33,591
Santa Maria	99,553	55,983	1,656	1,818	5,054	161	29,841	5,040	70,114
Solvang	5,245	4,326	38	59	72	1	611	138	1,530
Census-designated places	Total; Population	White	African; American	Native; American	Asian	Pacific; Islander	other races	two or more races	Hispanic or Latino (of any race)
Ballard	467	432	3	1	2	0	12	17	46
Casmalia	138	91	3	0	1	0	30	13	58
Cuyama	57	40	0	2	0	0	14	1	40
Garey	68	53	0	1	0	0	5	9	21
Isla Vista	23,096	14,875	594	104	3,387	45	2,686	1,405	5,265
Los Alamos	1,890	1,667	5	10	32	0	134	42	773
Los Olivos	1,132	1,049	1	4	12	5	40	21	125
Mission Canyon	2,381	2,193	14	17	40	11	35	71	198
Mission Hills	3,576	2,689	91	74	125	9	386	202	1,137
Montecito	8,965	8,267	55	38	218	6	156	225	605
New Cuyama	517	418	3	14	3	0	53	26	234
Orcutt	35,262	28,677	394	347	1,129	59	2,006	1,293	6,530
Santa Ynez	4,418	3,797	12	234	51	4	147	173	639
Sisquoc	183	146	0	5	3	0	9	20	58
Summerland	1,448	1,295	3	7	41	6	51	45	192
Toro Canyon	1,508	1,388	7	7	14	1	73	18	293
Vandenberg SFB	3,338	2,317	307	26	207	24	140	317	616
Vandenberg Village	6,497	5,029	271	60	323	58	432	324	1,216
Other unincorporated areas	Total; Population	White	African; American	Native; American	Asian	Pacific; Islander	other races	two or more races	Hispanic or Latino (of any race)
All others not CDPs (combined)	44,833	35,543	515	409	1,834	63	4,959	1,510	12,780

=== 2000 census ===
As of the census of 2000, there were 399,347 people, 136,622 households, and 89,487 families residing in the county. The population density was 146 people per square mile (56 people/km^{2}). There were 142,901 housing units at an average density of 52 units per square mile (20 units/km^{2}). The ethnic makeup of the county was 72.7% White, 2.3% Black or African American, 1.2% Native American, 4.1% Asian, 0.2% Pacific Islander, 15.2% from other races, and 4.3% from two or more races. 34.2% of the population were Hispanic or Latino of any race. 9.1% were of German, 8.5% English and 6.5% Irish ancestry according to Census 2000. 26.6% of the population reported speaking Spanish at home.

There were 136,622 households, out of which 32.4% had children under the age of 18 living with them, 51.4% were married couples living together, 10.0% had a female householder with no husband present, and 34.5% were non-families. 24.3% of all households were made up of individuals, and 9.4% had someone living alone who was 65 years of age or older. The average household size was 2.8 and the average family size was 3.33.

In the county, 24.9% of the population was under the age of 18, 13.3% was from 18 to 24, 29.0% from 25 to 44, 20.1% from 45 to 64, and 12.7% was 65 years of age or older. The median age was 33 years. For every 100 females there were 100.1 males. For every 100 females age 18 and over, there were 98.1 males.

The median income for a household in the county was $46,677, and the median income for a family was $54,042. Males had a median income of $37,997 versus $29,593 for females. The per capita income for the county was $23,059. About 8.5% of families and 14.3% of the population were below the poverty line, including 16.3% of those under age 18 and 6.2% of those age 65 or over.

The population of the area south of the Santa Ynez Mountain crest—the portion known as "South County"—was 201,161 according to the 2000 census; thus the population is almost exactly split between north and south. Recent years have shown slow or even negative growth for regions in the south county, while areas in the north county have continued to grow at a faster rate.

== Government and policing ==
=== County government ===
Santa Barbara County is a California Constitution defined general law county and is governed by an elected Board of Supervisors. The Board consists of five members, elected by districts, who serve four-year staggered terms. The Board's three-vote majority has shifted over the years between the north and south. The Board now includes two members from South County, two members from North County, and one member from Mid-County.

The Board of Supervisors appoints a County Executive Officer, who serves at the pleasure of the Board, to operate the County governmental organization. The County government includes 4296 employees and a budget of $757 million. The County provides various services ranging from health services to law enforcement.

=== Federal and state representation ===
All of Santa Barbara County is located within California's 24th congressional district, represented by Democrat Salud Carbajal. Prior to the 2012 redistricting in California, the county was divided into two congressional districts, which reflected the north and south divide – the hallmark of the county's politics. Lois Capps represented the coastal areas, while Elton Gallegly, a Republican, represented the northern part of the county.

In the California State Senate, Santa Barbara is in the 21st senatorial district, represented by Democrat Monique Limón. In the California State Assembly, Santa Barbara is in the 37th Assembly district, represented by Democrat Gregg Hart.

=== Policing ===
The Santa Barbara County Sheriff provides court protection, jail management, and coroner service for the entire county. It provides patrol and detective services for the unincorporated areas of the county and two cities by contract. Incorporated municipalities within the county that have their own municipal police departments are Santa Maria, Lompoc, and Santa Barbara City. Carpinteria and Goleta by contract with the Sheriff.

The Santa Barbara County Probation Department provides services for those placed on probation or detained in Santa Maria Juvenile Hall. Holly Benton is the current chief probation officer. The department was established in 1909 following the enactment of California's first probation laws. After 106 years in service, there are currently 241 probation officers and juvenile institutions officers keeping tabs on 6,600 adults and 1,350 juveniles as of 2015. The probation department has locations in Santa Maria, Santa Barbara, and Lompoc.

== Politics ==
For most of the 20th century, Santa Barbara County was a Republican stronghold. From 1920 to 1988, it was only carried by two Democrats: Franklin D. Roosevelt and Lyndon B. Johnson. However, the county has leaned to the left in recent years. Overall, Santa Barbara now usually supports Democratic candidates in Presidential and congressional elections. The last Republican to win a majority in the county was George H. W. Bush in 1988. There remains a distinction between the more conservative northern areas of the county, which continue to largely support Republicans, and the more liberal southern areas, which are strongly Democratic.

United States presidential election results for Santa Barbara County, California
Year	Republican		Democratic		Third party(ies)	
Year	No.	%	No.	%	No.	%
1880	907	47.29%	717	37.38%	294	15.33%
1884	1,243	50.92%	1,050	43.02%	148	6.06%
1888	1,684	49.20%	1,565	45.72%	174	5.08%
1892	1,483	42.12%	1,228	34.88%	810	23.00%
1896	2,004	49.48%	1,916	47.31%	130	3.21%
1900	1,988	52.58%	1,599	42.29%	194	5.13%
1904	2,676	62.85%	1,152	27.05%	430	10.10%
1908	2,713	55.19%	1,640	33.36%	563	11.45%
1912	68	0.94%	2,819	38.84%	4,371	60.22%
1916	4,453	42.54%	5,198	49.65%	818	7.81%
1920	6,970	67.48%	2,586	25.04%	773	7.48%
1924	8,615	64.69%	1,242	9.33%	3,461	25.99%
1928	11,666	69.44%	4,954	29.49%	179	1.07%
1932	8,864	38.06%	13,373	57.42%	1,054	4.53%
1936	9,728	37.35%	15,923	61.14%	394	1.51%
1940	14,107	44.53%	17,237	54.41%	334	1.05%
1944	13,647	46.33%	15,721	53.37%	89	0.30%
1948	19,998	58.13%	13,085	38.04%	1,317	3.83%
1952	32,160	67.24%	15,490	32.39%	179	0.37%
1956	31,294	64.55%	16,925	34.91%	265	0.55%
1960	38,805	56.73%	29,409	42.99%	188	0.27%
1964	38,020	43.96%	48,381	55.94%	85	0.10%
1968	50,068	53.59%	37,565	40.21%	5,787	6.19%
1972	67,075	55.19%	50,609	41.64%	3,857	3.17%
1976	60,922	50.83%	55,018	45.91%	3,904	3.26%
1980	69,629	53.98%	40,650	31.51%	18,716	14.51%
1984	89,314	62.76%	51,243	36.01%	1,763	1.24%
1988	77,524	54.24%	63,586	44.48%	1,830	1.28%
1992	57,375	35.25%	69,215	42.53%	36,166	22.22%
1996	63,915	42.40%	70,650	46.87%	16,180	10.73%
2000	71,493	46.13%	73,411	47.37%	10,070	6.50%
2004	76,806	45.22%	90,314	53.17%	2,741	1.61%
2008	65,585	37.50%	105,614	60.38%	3,713	2.12%
2012	64,606	39.56%	94,129	57.63%	4,585	2.81%
2016	56,365	31.88%	107,142	60.61%	13,279	7.51%
2020	65,736	32.81%	129,963	64.87%	4,640	2.32%
2024	64,870	35.11%	114,149	61.78%	5,762	3.12%

Santa Barbara County has long been divided between competing political interests. North of the Santa Ynez Mountains, agricultural activities and oil development have long provided jobs. The northern portion also contains a large military base, Vandenberg Space Force Base, and thus military interests are prominent. These influences have created a Republican-leaning northern half.

The southern portion of Santa Barbara county has had an economy based on tourism, with a significant percentage of people with white-collar jobs, formerly in aerospace but more recently in software and other high-tech pursuits. Additionally, the University of California, Santa Barbara contributes to a liberal populace. The southern portion of the county has a strong history of left-wing activism, with anti-war protests common in Santa Barbara. It is generally believed that the inspiration for Earth Day was the 1969 Santa Barbara oil spill. Gaylord Nelson, the senator who proposed the idea, has never directly cited any direct cause for the establishment of the holiday.

On November 4, 2008, Santa Barbara County voted 53.5% against Proposition 8 which amended the California Constitution to ban same-sex marriages. It was the only county in Southern California to vote against the proposition.

=== Proposed county splits ===
In 1978, some residents of the northern area initiated an effort to create a "Los Padres County" out of the northern area of the county; in a referendum, this effort was defeated by a 3–1 margin.

In 2006, northern county organizations initiated a similar secession proposal, to create a proposed "Mission County." Then-Governor Arnold Schwarzenegger appointed a formation commission to research the viability of the proposed northern county, which reached the conclusion, stated in its final report released on March 28, 2005, that "the proposed County, upon formation in 2006, would not be economically viable at current levels of service." The proposed new Mission County would have included the cities of Santa Maria, Lompoc, Guadalupe, Buellton, and Solvang, as well as the Cuyama Valley and Santa Ynez Valley, including Lake Cachuma. Most of the south coast of Santa Barbara County, along with the Channel Islands, would have remained with that county, with the exception of the stretch from Hollister Ranch to Point Conception. Most of the Los Padres National Forest also would have remained with Santa Barbara County. But in June 2006, voters rejected the formation of the new county, with more than 80% voting no.

=== Voter registration ===
A total of 46.8% of Santa Barbara County voters state their political party preference is Democratic, compared to 24.9% who prefer Republicans, and 21.6% who list No Party Preference. As of 2021, each of the eight cities had more Democrats than any other political party.

Population and registered voters
Total population	448,229	
Registered voters (Note: Percentage of registered voters with respect to total population. Percentages of party members with respect to registered voters follow.)	238,548	53.2%
Democratic	111,695	46.82%
Republican	59,500	24.94%
Democratic–Republican spread	+52,195	+21.9%
American Independent	7,995	3.35%
Green	1,109	0.46%
Libertarian	2,433	1.02%
Peace and Freedom	1,029	0.43%
Other	1,550	0.65%
No party preference	51,652	21.65%

Cities by population and voter registration
City	Population	Registered voters	Democratic	Republican	D–R spread	Other	No party preference
Buellton	3,425	54.3%	33.1%	41.7%	-8.6%	7.3%	20.4%
Carpinteria	13,106	49.7%	47.3%	26.3%	+21.0%	8.2%	20.9%
Goleta	29,634	54.1%	44.3%	27.9%	+16.4%	7.1%	22.8%
Guadalupe	6,901	27.3%	57.2%	15.3%	+41.9%	7.1%	22.6%
Lompoc	42,178	34.1%	37.7%	35.5%	+2.2%	9.1%	21.1%
Santa Barbara	88,192	52.2%	50.8%	20.4%	+30.4%	8.1%	23.1%
Santa Maria	109,707	27.8%	40.3%	33.5%	+6.8%	7.5%	21.4%
Solvang	5,237	58.3%	30.2%	46.5%	-16.3%	7.3%	18.6%

== Law enforcement & crime ==
Santa Barbara County Sheriff's Office
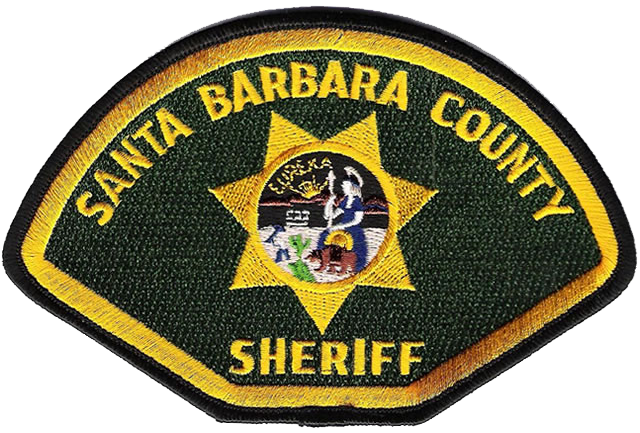
- Patch of the Santa Barbara County Sheriff's Office

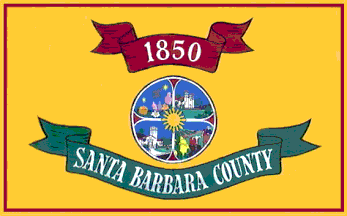
- Flag of Santa Barbara County, California
- Common name: Santa Barbara County Sheriff
- Abbreviation: SBSO
- Motto: "Keeping the Peace Since 1850"

Agency overview
- Formed: 1850; 176 years ago
- Employees: 640 (2012)
- Annual budget: US$112,730,087 (2012)

Jurisdictional structure
- General nature: Local civilian police

Operational structure
- Headquarters: Goleta, California
- Agency executive: Bill Brown, Sheriff
- Regions: 5: Cuyama; Goleta; Isla Vista; Santa Maria; Santa Ynez

Facilities
- Stations: 7: Buellton; Goleta; Isla Vista; Lompoc; New Cuyama; Santa Maria; Santa Ynez
- Helicopters: 4
- Police dogs: 4

Website
- www.sbsheriff.org

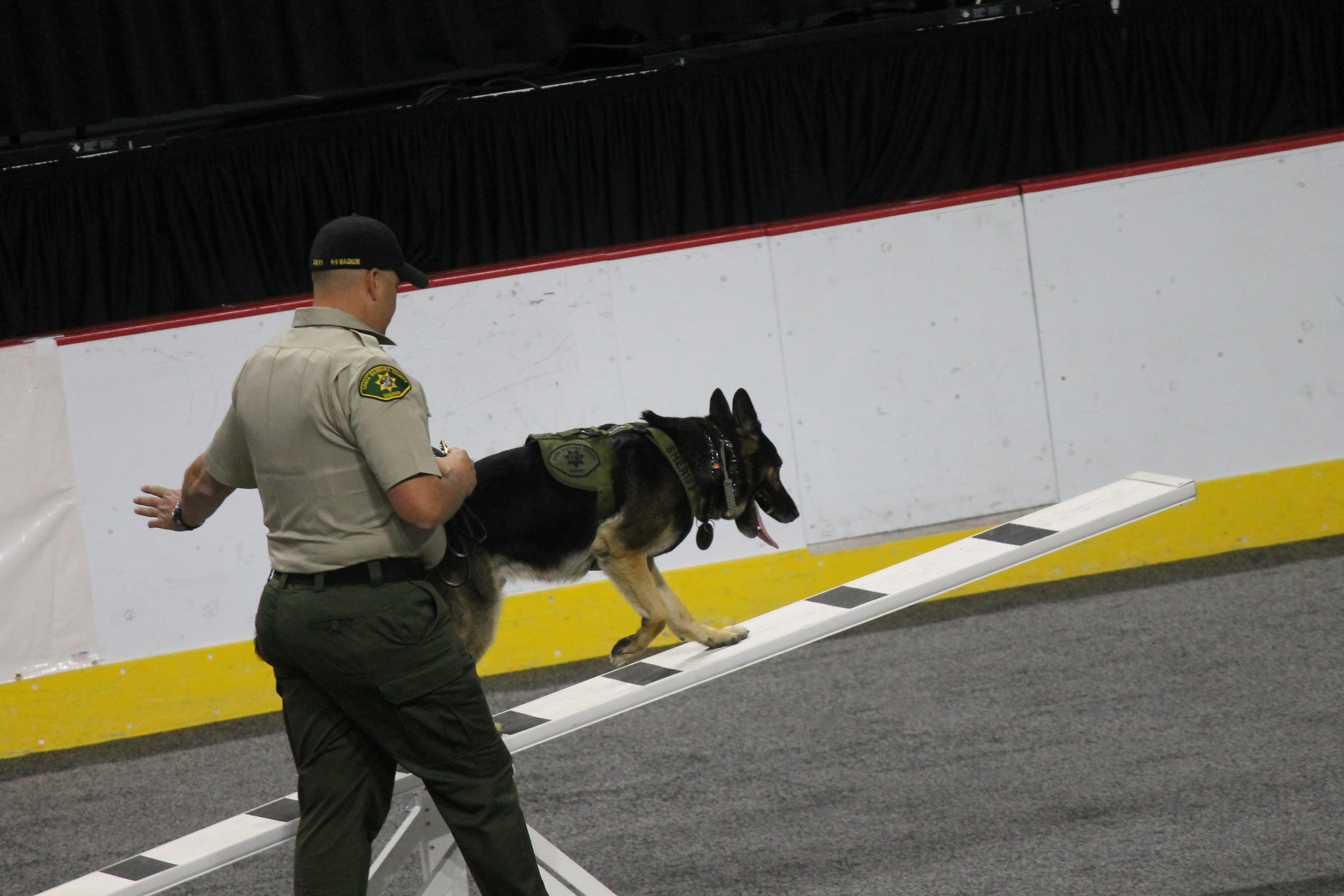
A k9 team at the 2017 Las Vegas K9 Trials.

The Santa Barbara County Sheriff's Office provides law enforcement for the unincorporated areas of the county, as well as several cities within the county. The cities that the Sheriff's Office provides police services for include Buellton, Carpinteria, Goleta and Solvang. In total the 640 full-time employees of the Sheriff's Office are responsible for 2,745 square miles (7,110 km^{2}) of the county.

Founded in 1850, the Santa Barbara Sheriff's Office is the oldest law enforcement agency in the state.

The following table includes the number of incidents reported and the rate per 1,000 persons for each type of offense.

Population and crime rates
Population	419,793	
Violent crime	1,897	4.52
Homicide	11	0.03
Forcible rape	123	0.29
Robbery	262	0.62
Aggravated assault	1,501	3.58
Property crime	4,740	11.29
Burglary	2,290	5.46
Larceny-theft	5,937	14.14
Motor vehicle theft	682	1.62
Arson	69	0.16

Cities by population and crime rates
City	Population	Violent crimes	Violent crime rate per 1,000 persons	Property crimes	Property crime rate per 1,000 persons
Buellton	4,908	3	0.61	93	18.95
Carpinteria	13,257	17	1.28	305	23.01
Goleta	30,384	50	1.65	523	17.21
Guadalupe	7,198	10	1.39	57	7.92
Lompoc	43,120	222	5.15	1,166	27.04
Santa Barbara	89,871	363	4.04	3,115	34.66
Santa Maria	101,207	690	6.82	2,430	24.01
Solvang	5,332	5	0.94	63	11.82

== Economy ==
Oil production began in 1886 with drilling in Summerland. Enormous oil fields such as the Orcutt, Lompoc, Santa Maria Valley, and Cat Canyon fields provided jobs and a steady supply of oil, gas, and asphalt since the first oil discovery in the Solomon Hills in 1901. Protests have marked periodic resistance to the impact of oil drilling over the years. A protest in 1929 in Santa Barbara expressed the frustration of the wealthy who came here to get away from it all. The largest spill in California waters, credited as a spark for the modern environmental movement, coated the beaches and Santa Barbara Harbor with a thick crude in 1969. In recent years, major oil companies have left the area, turning over their oil leases to small independents, and decommissioning some leases areas that were no longer profitable. Concerns about the economy were foremost when, in 2014, Measure P was placed on the county ballot. If approve by the voters the measure would ban "high-intensity petroleum operations" in the county.

The city of Santa Barbara and other coastal communities support a significant tourism economy. White-collar jobs, previously with an emphasis in aerospace but more recently in software and other high-tech pursuits are encouraged by proximity to the University of California, Santa Barbara. Vandenberg Space Force Base has traditionally had a large economic impact in the northern portion of the county and continues to be the site of frequent satellite launches.

=== Agriculture ===
Agriculture is a major industry. Strawberries are the county's top crop, with $413 million in production making up more than a third of all county agricultural production. Wine grapes are typically number two. In 2022, cauliflower was number two due to the weather and popularity of cauliflower rice.

County farmers began growing hemp after it was removed from a list of controlled substances along with other provisions of the Hemp Farming Act of 2018. These provisions were included in the 2018 Farm Bill which made hemp legal for agricultural uses. Cannabis and hemp plants have a similar look and smell making it hard to tell the difference.

==== Wine country ====
The first wine grapes in Santa Barbara county were planted by the missionaries associated with Mission Santa Barbara late in the 18th century. Since commercial viticulture rebounded in the 1960s, Santa Barbara County has become a prominent viticultural region. The 2004 Alexander Payne film, Sideways, set in the Santa Ynez Valley, brought additional attention to the county as a wine region, especially for its Pinot noir wines.

The region, also noted for its Chardonnay wines, is gaining a reputation for Rhone varietals including Syrah and Viognier.

The areas planted with wine grapes are mixed in with the rolling hills, ancient oak trees, oil fields, cattle ranches, and natural areas in the central part of the county. The county has more than 115 wineries cultivating 16,000 acres (6,500 ha) with the vast majority of the vineyards in the Central Coast American Viticultural Areas: Santa Maria Valley AVA, Santa Ynez Valley AVA, Sta. Rita Hills AVA, Happy Canyon AVA, Los Olivos District AVA and Ballard Canyon AVA. The county continues to gain AVA recognition with Alisos Canyon AVA being the recent established AVA in 2020.

The Foxen Canyon Wine Trail features many wineries including Andrew Murray Vineyards, Fess Parker Winery and Firestone Vineyard. The Cambria Estate Winery, was featured in the 3rd episode of The Bachelor, an American reality television series, Season 15, on January 17, 2011.

Pinot Noir and Chardonnay are common all long the trail while the southern part also has many Rhone style wines due to the warmer climate. In the North, Burgundy styles tend to predominate more due to the cooler maritime weather.

==== Cannabis ====
The county limited retail sales to eight establishments that will be distributed so they don't become clustered in any of the unincorporated communities. Under the legalization of recreational cannabis in California, companies must be licensed by the local agency and the state to grow, test, or sell cannabis and the county may authorize none or only some of these activities. Local governments may not prohibit adults, who are in compliance with state laws, from growing, using, or transporting marijuana for personal use.

In the first four months of the legalization of growing cannabis for recreational purposes in California, the county issued almost 800 permits for cultivators, the most of any county in the state. Taxes are based on the value of the crop sold whereas all other counties in California use the acreage of the farm.

The Carpinteria Valley became the densest concentration of cannabis farms in the United States in 2019. Farmers combined small permits for neighboring plots of land though as licenses for over 1 acre of land were not allowed until 2023. Most of these growing operations are in greenhouses. The owners of many greenhouses in the Carpinteria Valley, that were built as nurseries for flowers and other plants, have converted them to growing cannabis.

While the grow operations are outside the city limits of Carpinteria, city residents have complained about the smell of odor-intense terpenes given off by cannabis plants. The county contracts with a private industrial hygienist to ensure odor pollution is not occurring. The Sheriff's Department has a Cannabis Compliance Team that conducts background checks on cannabis growers and their employees and carries out raids on illegal operations.

A report in 2022 to the Board of Supervisors had 79 cannabis operations operating in the county. The county has a 1,575-acre cap (637 ha) on outdoor cannabis.

== Education ==
There are 20 independent school districts in Santa Barbara County, and the Santa Barbara County Education Office serves as an intermediate agency between those districts and the California Department of Education. During the 2013 school year, 67,701 students were enrolled in Santa Barbara County schools, kindergarten through grade 12.

There are also a number of private schools in the county. The Los Angeles Archdiocese operates two Catholic high schools and several elementary schools.

== Arts and culture ==
In addition to 41 listings of National Register of Historic Place and 16 California Historical Landmarks, the county lists 50 County of Santa Barbara Landmarks.

The museums reflecting the city's rich cultural heritage and contemporary artistic scene. Notable among these is the Santa Barbara Museum of Art, which boasts an extensive collection of American, Asian, and European art. The Museum of Natural History offers immersive exhibits on regional wildlife and environments, along with a state-of-the-art planetarium. The Santa Barbara Historical Museum provides deep insights into the city's past with its extensive archives and artifacts.

== Transportation ==
=== Major highways ===
- U.S. Route 101
- State Route 1
- State Route 33
- State Route 135
- State Route 144
- State Route 150
- State Route 154
- State Route 166
- State Route 192
- State Route 217
- State Route 246

=== Public transportation ===
Santa Barbara County is served by Amtrak trains and Greyhound buses. The southern portion of the county is served by the Santa Barbara Metropolitan Transit District. In the North County, the cities of Lompoc, Santa Maria, and Buellton/Solvang have their own bus services.

=== Airports ===
- Santa Barbara Municipal Airport, is located near Goleta, west of Santa Barbara.
- Santa Maria Public Airport is located just southwest of Downtown Santa Maria.
- Lompoc Airport is located on the north side of Lompoc.
- Santa Ynez Airport is just southeast of Santa Ynez.

Commercial flights are available at Santa Barbara Airport and Santa Maria Public Airport.

== Communities ==
=== Cities ===
- Buellton
- Carpinteria
- Goleta
- Guadalupe
- Lompoc
- Santa Barbara (county seat)
- Santa Maria (largest city)
- Solvang

=== Unincorporated communities ===
- Ballard (Note: For statistical purposes, defined by the United States Census Bureau as a census-designated place (CDP).)
- Casmalia
- Cuyama
- Eastern Goleta Valley
- Garey
- Gaviota
- Hope Ranch
- Isla Vista
- Los Alamos
- Los Olivos
- Mission Canyon
- Mission Hills
- Montecito
- New Cuyama
- Orcutt
- Painted Cave
- Santa Ynez
- Sisquoc
- Summerland
- Surf
- Toro Canyon
- UC Santa Barbara
- Vandenberg Space Force Base
- Vandenberg Village
- Ventucopa

=== Population ranking ===
The population ranking of the following table is based on the 2020 United States census of Santa Barbara County.

† county seat

Rank	City/Town/etc.	Municipal type	Population (2020 Census)
1	Santa Maria	City	109,707
2	† Santa Barbara	City	88,665
3	Lompoc	City	44,444
4	Goleta	City	32,690
5	Orcutt	CDP	32,034
6	Isla Vista	CDP	15,500
7	Carpinteria	City	13,264
8	Montecito	CDP	8,638
9	Guadalupe	City	8,057
10	Vandenberg Village	CDP	7,308
11	Solvang	City	6,126
12	Buellton	City	5,161
13	Santa Ynez	CDP	4,505
14	Mission Hills	CDP	3,571
15	Vandenberg SFB	CDP	3,559
16	Mission Canyon	CDP	2,540
17	Los Alamos	CDP	1,839
18	Toro Canyon	CDP	1,835
19	Summerland	CDP	1,222
20	Los Olivos	CDP	1,202
21	Ballard	CDP	768
22	New Cuyama	CDP	542
23	Santa Ynez Reservation	AIAN	264
24	Sisquoc	CDP	191
25	Casmalia	CDP	147
26	Garey	CDP	72
27	Cuyama	CDP	37

== See also ==
- List of museums in the California Central Coast
- National Register of Historic Places listings in Santa Barbara County, California
- List of school districts in San Luis Obispo County, California
- List of school districts in Santa Barbara County, California
- List of schools in the Roman Catholic Archdiocese of Los Angeles
- Santa Barbara County Courthouse
- Santa Barbara County Fire Department
- Santa Barbara County Probation Department
