= Burt M. Henson =

American politician

Member of the California State Assembly from the 37th district
- In office January 7, 1963 – November 30, 1966
- Preceded by: Rex M. Cunningham
- Succeeded by: John Kenyon MacDonald

Personal details
- Born: May 28, 1926 Oakland, California, US
- Died: January 30, 2003 (aged 76) Ventura, California, US
- Party: Democratic
- Spouse: Nancy Gleichmann (m. 1957, ?) Harriet Farrell Kosmo (m. 1980; died 1999)
- Children: 5

Military service
- Branch/service: United States Navy
- Battles/wars: World War II

Burt M. Henson (May 28, 1926 – January 30, 2003) served in the California State Assembly for the 37th district from 1963 to 1966. During World War II also he served in the United States Navy.
