= Andrew Murray Vineyards =

American winery located in California

- Location: Los Olivos, California, USA
- Appellation: Santa Ynez Valley AVA
- Other labels: This is E11even Wines
- Founded: 1990
- First vintage: 1993
- Key people: Andrew Murray, Owner & Winemaker
- Varietals: Syrah, Grenache, Viognier, Roussanne, Marsanne, Grenache blanc
- Distribution: National; limited exports
- Tasting: Los Olivos Wine Tasting Room and Los Olivos Winery
- Website: AndrewMurrayVineyards.com

Andrew Murray Vineyards is a family-owned winery located in Los Olivos, California. Nestled in the Santa Ynez Valley AVA of Santa Barbara County, it specializes in Rhône varieties Syrah, Grenache, Roussanne, Marsanne, and Grenache blanc.

Andrew Murray Vineyards is one of the wineries along the famous Foxen Canyon Wine Trail.

== History ==
Andrew Murray Vineyards was founded in 1990 when entrepreneurs Jim and Fran Murray sold their southern California restaurants and 'retired' to 200 acres of fertile soil in the Santa Ynez Valley. With their son and winemaker Andrew Murray at the helm, the Los Olivos winery is now a well-respected purveyor of Rhône-style wines.

Andrew (born February 1, 1972) came of age in the wine business. As a teenager, Andrew traveled with his family on lengthy expeditions in France’s Rhône Valley wine region. He acted as translator as his father interviewed some of France’s notable winemakers. Together they planted their vineyard on steep hillside slopes.

Andrew earned a bachelor of science degree in enology and viticulture from the University of California, Davis, and studied the art of crafting Syrah with an extended internship in Australia. He made his first wine in Australia at the age of 19 and his eponymous winery's first vintage was 1993. When the vineyard was sold in 2006, Andrew obtained leases for blocks of vineyards throughout California’s Central Coast for wine production. He established a new Los Olivos winery in a former brewery on property owned by fellow vintners, the Firestone family.

Regarded as a maverick in the wine business, Andrew Murray Vineyards took the controversial step of switching to screw-tops to enclose all its wines starting with the 2006 vintage. Among other things, Murray cited considerable industry cork failure rates as one of the chief reasons for his decision.
