= Stanley T. Tomlinson =

American politician

Member of the California State Assembly from the 36th district
- In office January 5, 1953 - January 3, 1955
- Preceded by: Harlan Hagen
- Succeeded by: James L. Holmes

Member of the California State Assembly from the 37th district
- In office January 3, 1949 - January 5, 1953
- Preceded by: Alfred W. Robertson
- Succeeded by: John B. Cooke

Personal details
- Born: July 9, 1903 Santa Barbara, California
- Died: April 9, 1990 (aged 86)
- Party: Republican
- Spouse: Constance E. Mills (m. 1937)
- Children: 1

Military service
- Branch/service: United States Navy
- Battles/wars: World War II

Stanley T. Tomlinson (July 9, 1903 - April 9, 1990) served in the California State Assembly for the 37th and 36th from 1949 to 1955. During World War II he also served in the United States Navy.
