= Garey, California =

Garey
- census-designated place
- Location of Garey in Santa Barbara County, California.

- Position in California.
- Coordinates: 34°53′09″N 120°18′50″W
- Country: United States
- State: California
- County: Santa Barbara

Area
  - Total: 1.269 sq mi (3.286 km^{2})
  - Land: 1.265 sq mi (3.276 km^{2})
  - Water: 0.0039 sq mi (0.010 km^{2}) 0.30%
- Elevation: 387 ft (118 m)

Population (2020)
  - Total: 72
  - Density: 57/sq mi (22/km^{2})
- Time zone: UTC-8 (Pacific (PST))
  - Summer (DST): UTC-7 (PDT)
- ZIP Code: 93454
- Area code: 805
- GNIS feature ID: 2583023

Garey is a census-designated place in Santa Barbara County, California, United States, located east of U.S. Route 101, approximately 10 miles (16 km) southeast of Santa Maria and 5 miles (8.0 km) north of Sisquoc. The ZIP Code is 93454, and the community is served by area code 805. The population was 72 at the 2020 census.

== History ==
Garey was founded in 1889, named after horticulturalist Thomas Garey.

== Geography ==
According to the United States Census Bureau, the CDP covers an area of 1.3 square miles (3.3 km^{2}), of which 99.70% is land, and 0.30% is water.

== Demographics ==
Historical population
Census	Pop.	Note	%±
2010	68		—
2020	72		5.9%
U.S. Decennial Census; 2000 2010; 2020

Garey first appeared as a census designated place in the 2010 U.S. census.

=== Racial and ethnic composition ===
Garey CDP, California – Racial and ethnic composition Note: the US Census treats Hispanic/Latino as an ethnic category. This table excludes Latinos from the racial categories and assigns them to a separate category. Hispanics/Latinos may be of any race.
Race / Ethnicity (NH = Non-Hispanic)	Pop 2010	Pop 2020	% 2010	% 2020
White alone (NH)	41	45	60.29%	62.50%
Black or African American alone (NH)	0	0	0.00%	0.00%
Native American or Alaska Native alone (NH)	0	1	0.00%	1.39%
Asian alone (NH)	0	1	0.00%	1.39%
Native Hawaiian or Pacific Islander alone (NH)	0	0	0.00%	0.00%
Other race alone (NH)	0	1	0.00%	1.39%
Mixed race or Multiracial (NH)	6	6	8.82%	8.33%
Hispanic or Latino (any race)	21	18	30.88%	25.00%
Total	68	72	100.00%	100.00%

=== 2020 census ===
The 2020 United States census reported that Garey had a population of 72. The population density was 56.9 inhabitants per square mile (22.0/km^{2}). The racial makeup of Garey was 55 (76%) White, 0 (0%) African American, 1 (1%) Native American, 1 (1%) Asian, 0 (0%) Pacific Islander, 5 (7%) from other races, and 10 (14%) from two or more races. Hispanic or Latino of any race were 18 persons (25%).

The whole population lived in households. There were 27 households, out of which 8 (30%) had children under the age of 18 living in them, 14 (52%) were married-couple households, 1 (4%) were cohabiting couple households, 7 (26%) had a female householder with no partner present, and 5 (19%) had a male householder with no partner present. 5 households (19%) were one person, and 1 (4%) were one person aged 65 or older. The average household size was 2.67. There were 19 families (70% of all households).

The age distribution was 13 people (18%) under the age of 18, 9 people (13%) aged 18 to 24, 10 people (14%) aged 25 to 44, 26 people (36%) aged 45 to 64, and 14 people (19%) who were 65 years of age or older. The median age was 48.0 years. There were 27 males and 45 females.

There were 33 housing units at an average density of 26.1 units per square mile (10.1 units/km^{2}), of which 27 (82%) were occupied. Of these, 17 (63%) were owner-occupied, and 10 (37%) were occupied by renters.
