= Gregg Hart =

American politician

- Official portrait, 2022

Member of the California State Assembly from the 37th district
- Incumbent
- Assumed office December 5, 2022
- Preceded by: Steve Bennett (redistricted)

Personal details
- Born: August 24, 1959 (age 67)
- Party: Democratic
- Education: University of California, Santa Barbara

Gregg Hart (born August 24, 1959) is an American politician serving as a member of the California State Assembly for the 37th district. Elected in November 2022, he assumed office on December 5, 2022.

== Early life and education ==
Hart graduated from University of California, Santa Barbara.

== Career ==
Hart previously worked as the Santa Barbara County Supervisor representing the 2nd Supervisorial District and before that was a member of the Santa Barbara City Council.

He was elected to the California State Assembly in 2022 after defeating Republican former Santa Barbara County Supervisor Mike Stoker.

Hart is a member of the California Legislative Progressive Caucus.

== Electoral history ==
2022 California State Assembly 37th district election
Primary election
Party	Candidate	Votes	%
Democratic	Gregg Hart	54,923	56.1
Republican	Mike Stoker	39,815	40.6
Democratic	Bruce Wallach	3,241	3.3
Total votes		97,979	100.0
General election
Democratic	Gregg Hart	84,345	58.0
Republican	Mike Stoker	60,959	42.0
Total votes		145,304	100.0
Democratic hold			

2024 California State Assembly 37th district election
Primary election
Party	Candidate	Votes	%
Democratic	Gregg Hart (incumbent)	63,766	60.4
Republican	Sari Domingues	41,888	39.6
Total votes		105,654	100.0
General election
Democratic	Gregg Hart (incumbent)	115,216	60.7
Republican	Sari Domingues	74,463	39.3
Total votes		189,679	100.0
Democratic hold			
