= Roscoe W. Burson =

American politician (1895–1960)

Member of the California State Assembly from the 40th district
- In office January 2, 1939 - January 6, 1941
- Preceded by: Fred P. Muldoon
- Succeeded by: John B. Cooke

Personal details
- Born: July 4, 1895 Fillmore, California
- Died: July 3, 1960 (aged 64) Santa Barbara, California
- Party: Republican

Military service
- Branch/service: United States Army
- Battles/wars: World War I

Roscoe William Burson (July 4, 1895 - July 3, 1960) served in the California State Assembly for the 40th district from 1939 to 1941. During World War I he served in the United States Army.
