= Sisquoc, California =

Sisquoc
- census-designated place
- Position in California.
- Coordinates: 34°51′43″N 120°17′40″W
- Country: United States
- State: California
- County: Santa Barbara

Area
  - Total: 2.234 sq mi (5.786 km^{2})
  - Land: 2.230 sq mi (5.775 km^{2})
  - Water: 0.0042 sq mi (0.011 km^{2}) 0.18%
- Elevation: 456 ft (139 m)

Population (2020)
  - Total: 191
  - Density: 85.7/sq mi (33.1/km^{2})
- Time zone: UTC-8 (Pacific (PST))
  - Summer (DST): UTC-7 (PDT)
- ZIP Code: 93454
- Area code: 805
- GNIS feature ID: 2583144

Sisquoc (Chumash for "quail") is a census-designated place in Santa Barbara County, California, United States, located east of U.S. Route 101, approximately 15 miles (24 km) southeast of Santa Maria and 5 miles (8.0 km) south of Garey. The ZIP Code is 93454, and the community is served by area code 805. Sisquoc has a fire station, a church, a Preschool-8 school and a store. It has a micro-climate with mild weather year-round. The population was 191 at the 2020 census.

The town is at the intersection of Palmer and Foxen Canyon Roads, at the southwestern edge of the floodplain of the Sisquoc River. The predominant land use on the plain is agriculture, while the hills to the south and west contain the Cat Canyon Oil Field, with Greka Energy and ERG Resources, LLC being the largest operators.

Sisquoc is an agricultural area. It is well known for vineyards and strawberry fields. The terrain is hilly, and there are mountains in the distance. Wildlife near Sisquoc includes bobcats, coyotes, mountain lions, rabbits, and gophers.

There is one closed store in town called the Sisquoc store, and a fire station. There is one school in town called Benjamin Foxen, home of the Bobcats. Benjamin Foxen is the only remaining school of 5 in the Blochman School District. The Blochman School PTA (Parent Teacher Association) was established in 1960. Students and teachers at Blochman run a school garden, and fresh produce from the garden is served in the cafeteria.

== Geography ==
According to the United States Census Bureau, the CDP covers an area of 2.2 square miles (5.8 km^{2}), of which 99.82% is land, and 0.18% is water.

== Demographics ==
Historical population
Census	Pop.	Note	%±
2010	183		—
2020	191		4.4%
U.S. Decennial Census; 1860–1870 1880-1890; 1900 1910 1920; 1930 1940 1950; 1960 1970 1980; 1990 2000 2010; 2020

Sisquoc first appeared as a census designated place in the 2010 U.S. census.

=== Racial and ethnic composition ===
Sisquoc CDP, California – Racial and ethnic composition Note: the US Census treats Hispanic/Latino as an ethnic category. This table excludes Latinos from the racial categories and assigns them to a separate category. Hispanics/Latinos may be of any race.
Race / Ethnicity (NH = Non-Hispanic)	Pop 2010	Pop 2020	% 2010	% 2020
White alone (NH)	109	111	59.56%	58.12%
Black or African American alone (NH)	0	0	0.00%	0.00%
Native American or Alaska Native alone (NH)	3	3	1.64%	1.57%
Asian alone (NH)	3	3	1.64%	1.57%
Native Hawaiian or Pacific Islander alone (NH)	0	0	0.00%	0.00%
Other race alone (NH)	0	3	0.00%	1.57%
Mixed race or Multiracial (NH)	10	14	5.46%	7.33%
Hispanic or Latino (any race)	58	57	31.69%	29.84%
Total	183	191	100.00%	100.00%

=== 2020 ===
The 2020 United States census reported that Sisquoc had a population of 191. The population density was 85.7 inhabitants per square mile (33.1/km^{2}). The racial makeup of Sisquoc was 133 (69.6%) White, 0 (0.0%) African American, 6 (3.1%) Native American, 3 (1.6%) Asian, 0 (0.0%) Pacific Islander, 16 (8.4%) from other races, and 33 (17.3%) from two or more races. Hispanic or Latino of any race were 57 persons (29.8%).

The whole population lived in households. There were 72 households, out of which 29 (40.3%) had children under the age of 18 living in them, 36 (50.0%) were married-couple households, 13 (18.1%) were cohabiting couple households, 15 (20.8%) had a female householder with no partner present, and 8 (11.1%) had a male householder with no partner present. 14 households (19.4%) were one person, and 3 (4.2%) were one person aged 65 or older. The average household size was 2.65. There were 52 families (72.2% of all households).

The age distribution was 48 people (25.1%) under the age of 18, 7 people (3.7%) aged 18 to 24, 55 people (28.8%) aged 25 to 44, 57 people (29.8%) aged 45 to 64, and 24 people (12.6%) who were 65 years of age or older. The median age was 38.5 years. There were 94 males and 97 females.

There were 76 housing units at an average density of 34.1 units per square mile (13.2 units/km^{2}), of which 72 (94.7%) were occupied. Of these, 38 (52.8%) were owner-occupied, and 34 (47.2%) were occupied by renters.
