= Nao Takasugi =

American politician and survivor of Japanese American internment camps

Member of the California State Assembly from the 37th district
- In office December 7, 1992 – December 7, 1998
- Preceded by: Cathie Wright
- Succeeded by: Tony Strickland

Personal details
- Born: April 5, 1922 Oxnard, California, U.S.
- Died: November 19, 2009 (aged 87) Oxnard, California
- Cause of death: Stroke
- Party: Republican
- Spouse: Judy Takasugi
- Children: 5, including Tricia
- Education: University of California, Los Angeles; Temple University; Wharton School of Business
- Occupation: Politician

Naoyuki Takasugi (高杉 直行, Takasugi Naoyuki; April 5, 1922 – November 19, 2009) was an American politician from California, a member of the Republican Party, and a survivor of the Japanese American internment camps.

== Early life ==
Born and raised in Oxnard, California, Takasugi was the valedictorian of his Oxnard High School class and worked in the family grocery store, the Asahi Market, before he enrolled at UCLA. After the Japanese attack on Pearl Harbor and President Franklin D. Roosevelt's Executive Order 9066, he was pulled out of the university at the age of 19 and removed with other Japanese Americans to the Tulare Assembly Center, where he shared a converted horse stall with his family. While in Tulare, Takasugi worked as a teacher's aide at the camp high school, teaching business and Spanish. He was later transferred to the War Relocation Authority camp at Gila River, Arizona. In February 1943, Takasugi became one of 4,000 students released from camp to continue college and relocated to the East Coast. He earned his bachelor's degree from Temple University in 1945 and his MBA from the Wharton School of Business at the University of Pennsylvania in 1946.

After graduating from the Ivy League school, he applied to multiple accounting firms in Philadelphia; he was turned down at each firm, later explaining, "They'd say, 'With that Asian face, we can't put you in the field." He instead returned to Oxnard to work in his family's Asahi Market. The Takasugi family had opened the store in 1907 and had left it in the custody of employee Ignacio Carmona when they were forced to enter camp. Upon the Takasugis' return from Gila River, Carmona returned control of the store to the Takasugis.

In 1952, Takasugi married his wife, Judy, with whom he had five children, Scott, Russell, Ron, Tricia and Lea.

== Public service ==
After the City of Oxnard turned down his efforts to get a new sign for his family's market, Takasugi felt the city needed someone with a head for business to cut through the bureaucracy and decided to run for the City Council and won a four-year term in his first election in 1976. He was reelected to the council in 1980 and then was elected Mayor of Oxnard in 1982. Takasugi won re-election as Mayor four more times before winning election to the Assembly.

Takasugi won election to the California State Assembly in 1992, then becoming the only Asian American in the legislature at that time. A moderate, he succeeded conservative icon Tom McClintock in the Ventura County based 37th district (formerly the 36th). He won easy reelection in 1994 and 1996 but term limits prevented him from running again in 1998.

In the year 2000 Takasugi ran for a seat on the board of the Oxnard Harbor District and won. He remained in the position until retiring in 2008.

== Later life ==
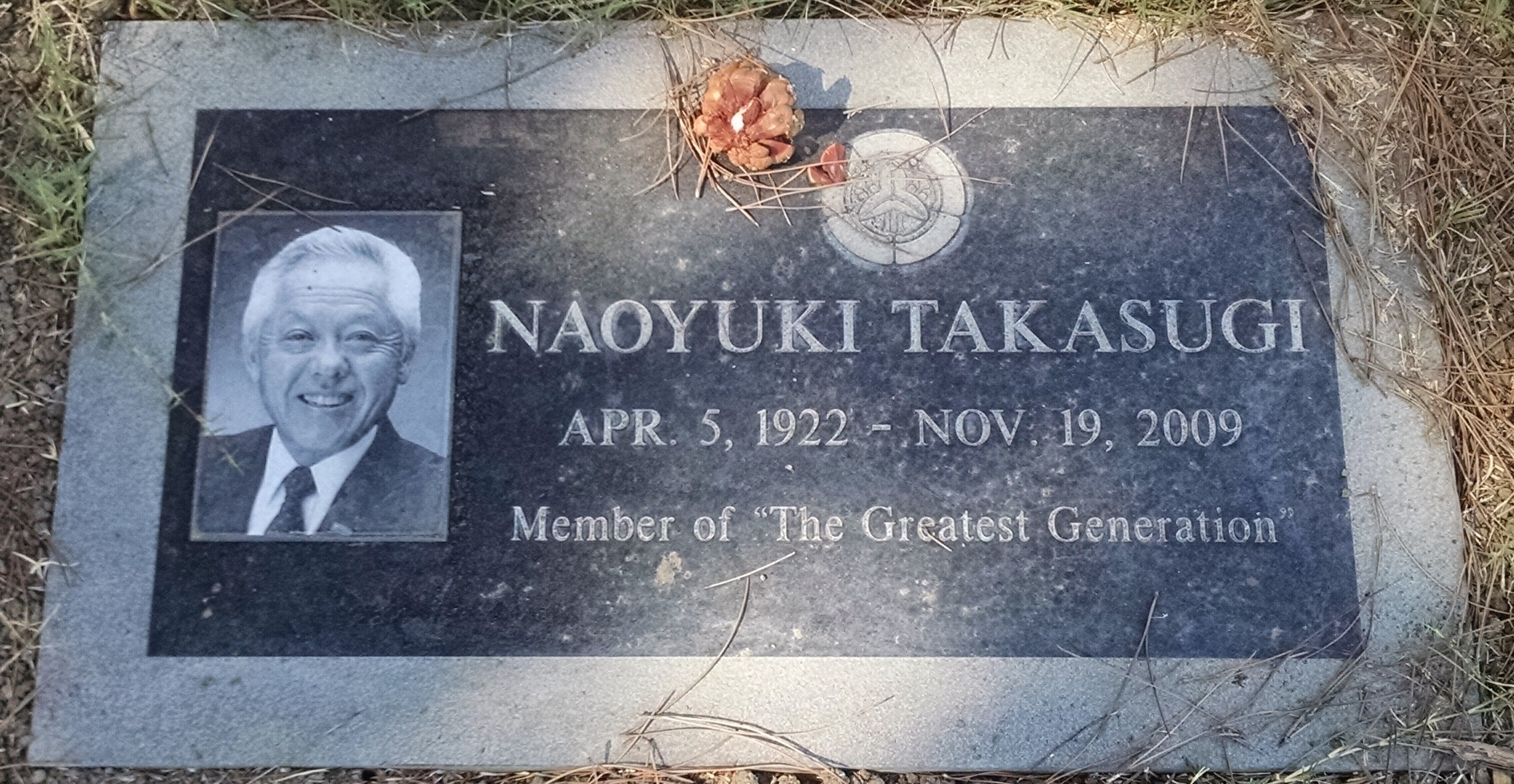
Takasugi's gravestone at Ivy Lawn Cemetery, Ventura, California.

In his final year in the Assembly at the age of 76, Takasugi suffered a heart attack while jogging outside his Sacramento apartment near the California State Capitol.

The Takasugi family was featured in the book "The Greatest Generation" by Tom Brokaw. During his interview with Brokaw, Nao Takasugi said "I find that I am compelled to remember the best – not the worst – of that time. To focus not on the grave deprivation of rights which beset us all, but rather on the countless shining moments of virtue that emerged from the shadows of that dark hour".

At the age of 87, Takasugi died of complications from a stroke on November 19, 2009, at 8:20 P.M. at St. John's Regional Medical Center in Oxnard. He was survived by his wife of 57 years, Judy.

== Electoral history ==
Member, California State Assembly: 1992–1998
Year	Office	Winner	Votes	Pct	Second Place	Votes	Pct	Third Place	Votes	Pct
1992	California State Assembly; District 37; Republican Nomination	Nao Takasugi	11,590	31.0%	Alan Gugenheim	8,570	22.9%	Madge Schaefer	7,034	18.8%
1992	California State Assembly; District 37	Nao Takasugi	66,364	50.8%	Roz McGrath	56,692	43.4%	David Harner	7,504	5.7%
1994	California State Assembly; District 37; Republican Nomination	Nao Takasugi	25,381	100.0%						
1994	California State Assembly; District 37	Nao Takasugi	66,035	64.5%	Dorothy Maron	31,738	31.0%	David Harner	4,660	4.5%
1996	California State Assembly; District 37; Republican Nomination	Nao Takasugi	27,941	76.9%	Matt Noah	8,377	23.1%			
1996	California State Assembly; District 37	Nao Takasugi	73,167	59.7%	Jess Herrera	49,341	40.3%			

California Assembly
Preceded by Cathie Wright	California State Assemblyman for the 37th District; December 7, 1992 - November 30, 1998	Succeeded by Tony Strickland
