= California's 37th State Assembly district =

American legislative district

Current assemblymember
Gregg Hart; D–Santa Barbara
- Population (2010) • Voting age • Citizen voting age: 466,200; 367,474; 307,080
- Demographics: 53.83% White; 1.54% Black; 37.91% Latino; 5.09% Asian; 0.88% Native American; 0.20% Hawaiian/Pacific Islander; 0.24% other; 0.32% remainder of multiracial
- Registered voters: 270,523
- Registration: 45.79% Democratic; 25.34% Republican; 23.72% No party preference

California's 37th State Assembly district is one of 80 California State Assembly districts. It is currently represented by Democrat Gregg Hart of Santa Barbara.

== District profile ==
The district encompasses nearly the entire county of Santa Barbara, with the exception of small amounts of sparsely inhabited area in the north of the county.

== Election results from statewide races ==
Year	Office	Results
2021	Recall	No 66.0 – 34.0%
2020	President	Biden 68.2 – 29.5%
2018	Governor	Newsom 64.6 – 35.4%
2018	Senator	Feinstein 56.4 – 43.6%
2016	President	Clinton 64.3 – 29.2%
2016	Senator	Harris 62.3 – 37.7%
2014	Governor	Brown 62.3 – 37.7%
2012	President	Obama 61.0 – 36.3%
2012	Senator	Feinstein 63.2 – 36.8%

== List of assembly members representing the district ==
Due to redistricting, the 37th district has been moved around different parts of the state. The current iteration resulted from the 2021 redistricting by the California Citizens Redistricting Commission.

Assembly members	Party	Years served	Counties represented	Notes
M. J. Sullivan	Republican	January 5, 1885 – January 3, 1887	San Francisco	
Thomas M. Searey	Democratic	January 3, 1887 – January 5, 1891	San Francisco	
M. W. Coffey	Republican	January 5, 1891 – January 2, 1893	San Francisco	
T. W. Burke	Independent	January 2, 1893 – January 7, 1895	San Francisco	
George W. Dixon	Republican	January 7, 1895 – January 4, 1897	San Francisco	
Harry I. Mulcrevy	Fusion	January 4, 1897 – January 2, 1899	San Francisco	
William E. White	Democratic	January 2, 1899 – January 1, 1901	San Francisco	
Arthur G. Fisk	Republican	January 1, 1901 – December 30, 1903	San Francisco	Resigned from office.
Vacant		December 30, 1903 – January 2, 1905	San Francisco	
Fred C. Jones	Republican	January 2, 1905 – January 7, 1907	San Francisco	
Dennis W. Barry	Republican	January 7, 1907 – January 4, 1909	San Francisco	
John J. McManus	Republican	January 4, 1909 – January 2, 1911	San Francisco	
Edward P. Walsh	Democratic	January 2, 1911 – January 6, 1913	San Francisco	
William C. Clark	Republican	January 6, 1913 – January 4, 1915	Alameda	
William T. Satterwhite	Progressive	January 4, 1915 – January 6, 1919	Alameda	
William T. Satterwhite	Republican	January 4, 1915 – January 6, 1919	Alameda	
Clifton E. Brooks	Republican	January 6, 1919 – January 8, 1923	Alameda	
Richard M. Lyman	Republican	January 8, 1923 – January 5, 1925	Alameda	
Eugene W. Roland	Republican	January 5, 1925 – January 2, 1933	Alameda	
Maurice S. Meeker	Republican	January 2, 1933 – January 7, 1935	Fresno	
S.L. Heisinger	Democratic	January 7, 1935 – January 4, 1943	Fresno	
Alfred W. Robertson	Democratic	January 4, 1943 – January 3, 1949	Santa Barbara	
Stanley T. Tomlinson	Republican	January 3, 1949 – January 5, 1953	Santa Barbara	
John B. Cooke	Democratic	January 5, 1953 – January 3, 1955	Ventura	
Rex M. Cunningham	Democratic	January 3, 1955 – January 7, 1963	Ventura	
Burt M. Henson	Democratic	January 7, 1963 – November 30, 1966	Ventura	Resigned to become a judge for the Ventura County Municipal Court.
Vacant		November 30, 1966 – January 2, 1967	Ventura	
John Kenyon MacDonald	Democratic	January 2, 1967 – November 30, 1974	Ventura	
Bob Cline	Republican	December 2, 1974 – November 30, 1980	Ventura, Los Angeles	
Cathie Wright	Republican	December 1, 1980 – November 30, 1992	Ventura, Los Angeles	
Cathie Wright	Republican	December 1, 1980 – November 30, 1992	Ventura, Los Angeles, Santa Barbara	
Nao Takasugi	Republican	December 7, 1992 – November 30, 1998	Ventura	
Tony Strickland	Republican	December 7, 1998 – November 30, 2004	Ventura	
Tony Strickland	Republican	December 7, 1998 – November 30, 2004	Ventura, Los Angeles	
Audra Strickland	Republican	December 6, 2004 – November 30, 2010	Ventura, Los Angeles	
Jeff Gorell	Republican	December 6, 2010 – November 30, 2012	Ventura, Los Angeles, Kern	
Das Williams	Democratic	December 3, 2012 – November 30, 2016	Ventura, San Luis Obispo, Santa Barbara	
Monique Limón	Democratic	December 5, 2016 – November 30, 2020	Ventura, San Luis Obispo, Santa Barbara	
Steve Bennett	Democratic	December 7, 2020 – November 30, 2022	Ventura, San Luis Obispo, Santa Barbara	
Gregg Hart	Democratic	December 5, 2022 – present	San Luis Obispo, Santa Barbara	

== Election results (1990–present) ==
=== 2024 ===
2024 California State Assembly 37th district election
Primary election
Party	Candidate	Votes	%
Democratic	Gregg Hart (incumbent)	63,766	60.4
Republican	Sari Domingues	41,888	39.6
Total votes		105,654	100.0
General election
Democratic	Gregg Hart (incumbent)	115,216	60.7
Republican	Sari Domingues	74,463	39.3
Total votes		189,679	100.0
Democratic hold			

=== 2022 ===
2022 California State Assembly 37th district election
Primary election
Party	Candidate	Votes	%
Democratic	Gregg Hart	54,923	56.1
Republican	Mike Stoker	39,815	40.6
Democratic	Bruce Wallach	3,241	3.3
Total votes		97,979	100.0
General election
Democratic	Gregg Hart	84,345	58.0
Republican	Mike Stoker	60,959	42.0
Total votes		145,304	100.0
Democratic hold			

=== 2020 ===
2020 California State Assembly 37th district election
Primary election
Party	Candidate	Votes	%
Republican	Charles W. Cole	41,945	27.5
Democratic	Steve Bennett	37,516	24.6
Democratic	Cathy Murillo	29,498	19.4
Democratic	Jonathan Abboud	12,039	7.9
Democratic	Jason Dominguez	11,177	7.3
Democratic	Elsa Granados	10,840	7.1
Democratic	Stephen Blum	9,278	6.1
Total votes		152,293	100.0
General election
Democratic	Steve Bennett	166,015	67.6
Republican	Charles W. Cole	79,661	32.4
Total votes		245,676	100.0
Democratic hold			

=== 2018 ===
2018 California State Assembly 37th district election
Primary election
Party	Candidate	Votes	%
Democratic	Monique Limón (incumbent)	69,382	84.3
Democratic	David L. Norrdin	7,487	9.1
Democratic	Sofia Collin	5,409	6.6
Total votes		82,278	100.0
General election
Democratic	Monique Limón (incumbent)	129,535	80.4
Democratic	David L. Norrdin	31,522	19.6
Total votes		161,057	100.0
Democratic hold			

=== 2016 ===
2016 California State Assembly 37th district election
Primary election
Party	Candidate	Votes	%
Democratic	Monique Limón	83,862	65.9
No party preference	Edward Fuller	43,420	34.1
Total votes		127,282	100.0
General election
Democratic	Monique Limón	128,344	64.1
No party preference	Edward Fuller	71,944	35.9
Total votes		200,288	100.0
Democratic hold			

=== 2014 ===
2014 California State Assembly 37th district election
Primary election
Party	Candidate	Votes	%
Democratic	Das Williams (incumbent)	43,124	57.3
Republican	Ron DeBlauw	32,110	42.7
Total votes		75,234	100.0
General election
Democratic	Das Williams (incumbent)	75,452	58.6
Republican	Ron DeBlauw	53,414	41.4
Total votes		128,866	100.0
Democratic hold			

=== 2012 ===
2012 California State Assembly 37th district election
Primary election
Party	Candidate	Votes	%
Democratic	Das Williams (incumbent)	52,400	56.3
Republican	Rob Walter	40,617	43.7
Total votes		93,017	100.0
General election
Democratic	Das Williams (incumbent)	115,532	60.4
Republican	Rob Walter	75,643	39.6
Total votes		191,175	100.0
Democratic gain from Republican			

=== 2010 ===
2010 California State Assembly 37th district election
Party	Candidate	Votes	%
Republican	Jeff Gorell	90,649	58.5
Democratic	Ferial Masry	64,413	41.5
Total votes		155,062	100.0
Republican hold			

=== 2008 ===
2008 California State Assembly 37th district election
Party	Candidate	Votes	%
Republican	Audra Strickland (incumbent)	102,087	52.1
Democratic	Ferial Masry	93,857	47.9
Total votes		195,944	100.0
Republican hold			

=== 2006 ===
2006 California State Assembly 37th district election
Party	Candidate	Votes	%
Republican	Audra Strickland (incumbent)	78,493	57.4
Democratic	Ferial Masry	58,305	42.6
Total votes		136,798	100.0
Republican hold			

=== 2004 ===
2004 California State Assembly 37th district election
Party	Candidate	Votes	%
Republican	Audra Strickland	100,309	55.1
Democratic	Ferial Masry	74,774	41.1
Green	Adrienne M. Prince	7,013	3.9
Total votes		182,096	100.0
Republican hold			

=== 2002 ===
2002 California State Assembly 37th district election
Party	Candidate	Votes	%
Republican	Tony Strickland (incumbent)	74,876	63.1
Democratic	Bruce James Thomas, Jr.	43,806	36.9
Total votes		118,682	100.0
Republican hold			

=== 2000 ===
2000 California State Assembly 37th district election
Party	Candidate	Votes	%
Republican	Tony Strickland (incumbent)	71,572	51.3
Democratic	Rosalind Ann McGrath	64,691	46.4
Libertarian	Willard Michlin	3,306	2.4
Total votes		139,569	100.0
Republican hold			

=== 1998 ===
1998 California State Assembly 37th district election
Party	Candidate	Votes	%
Republican	Tony Strickland	49,853	48.9
Democratic	Rosalind Ann McGrath	48,553	47.6
Reform	Michael Farris	3,593	3.5
Total votes		101,999	100.0
Republican hold			

=== 1996 ===
1996 California State Assembly 37th district election
Party	Candidate	Votes	%
Republican	Nao Takasugi (incumbent)	73,167	59.7
Democratic	Jens Herrera	49,341	40.3
Total votes		122,508	100.0
Republican hold			

=== 1994 ===
1994 California State Assembly 37th district election
Party	Candidate	Votes	%
Republican	Nao Takasugi (incumbent)	66,035	64.5
Democratic	Dorothy S. Maron	31,738	31.0
Libertarian	David A. Harner	4,660	4.5
Total votes		102,433	100.0
Republican hold			

=== 1992 ===
1992 California State Assembly 37th district election
Party	Candidate	Votes	%
Republican	Nao Takasugi	66,364	50.8
Democratic	Roz McGrath	56,692	43.4
Libertarian	David Harner	7,504	5.7
Total votes		130,560	100.0
Republican hold			

=== 1990 ===
1990 California State Assembly 37th district election
Party	Candidate	Votes	%
Republican	Cathie Wright (incumbent)	62,881	54.7
Democratic	Dennis A. Petrie	44,773	38.9
Libertarian	John R. Spooner, Sr.	7,356	6.4
Total votes		115,010	100.0
Republican hold			

== See also ==
- California State Assembly
- California State Assembly districts
- Districts in California
