= John B. Cooke =

American politician

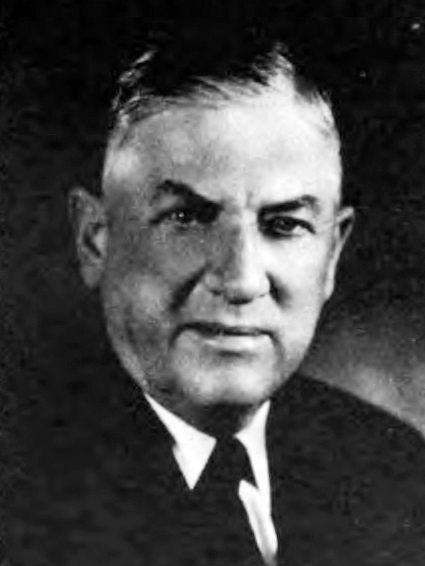
- Official portrait, 1950

Minority Leader of the California Assembly
- In office 1947–1948
- Preceded by: Alfred W. Robertson
- Succeeded by: Julian Beck

Member of the California State Assembly
- In office January 6, 1947 – January 3, 1955
- Preceded by: Walter J. Fourt
- Succeeded by: Rex M. Cunningham
- Constituency: 38th district (1947–1953); 37th district (1953–1955)
- In office January 6, 1941 – January 4, 1943
- Preceded by: Roscoe W. Burson
- Succeeded by: William H. Rosenthal
- Constituency: 40th district

Personal details
- Born: John Bleecker Cooke; May 17, 1885 Fort Smith, Arkansas, U.S.
- Died: June 26, 1971 (aged 86) Palo Alto, California, U.S.
- Party: Democratic
- Spouse(s): Alvina Nagel (m. 1908, died) Anne Klassen Joslin (m. 1924)
- Children: 1
- Relatives: Charles M. Cooke Jr. (brother)

Military service
- Allegiance: United States
- Branch/service: United States Navy
- Years of service: 1905–1923; 1941–1946
- Rank: Commander
- Battles/wars: World War I World War II

John Bleecker Cooke (May 17, 1885 – June 26, 1971) served in the California State Assembly for the 40th district from 1941 to 1943, the 38th and 37th district from 1947 to 1955. During World War I and World War II he also served in the United States Navy. Cooke died in Palo Alto in 1971 and was buried in Arlington National Cemetery.

His younger brother, Charles M. Cooke Jr., was a United States Naval Academy graduate and four-star admiral.
