= Richard M. Lyman =

American politician

Member of the California State Assembly from the 37th district
- In office January 8, 1923 – January 5, 1925
- Preceded by: Clifton E. Brooks
- Succeeded by: Eugene W. Roland

Personal details
- Born: March 15, 1893 Oakland, California
- Died: October 31, 1978 (aged 85) Oakland, California
- Party: Republican
- Spouse: Murial Atherton Cohen

Military service
- Branch/service: United States Army
- Battles/wars: World War I

Richard Morris Lyman Jr. (March 15, 1893 – October 31, 1978) served in the California State Assembly for the 37th district from 1923 to 1925. During World War I, he also served in the United States Army.
