= Steve Bennett (California politician) =

American politician

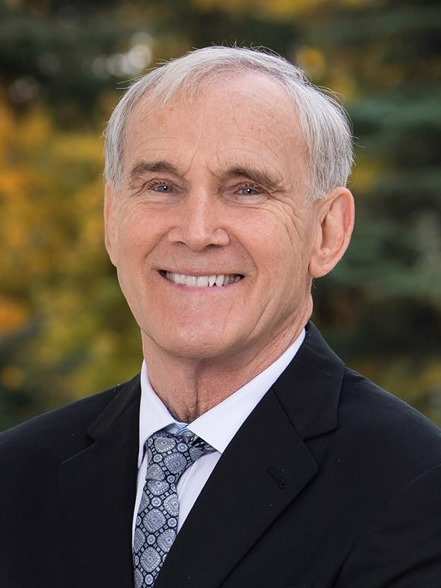

Member of the California State Assembly
- Incumbent
- Assumed office December 7, 2020
- Preceded by: Monique Limón
- Constituency: 37th district (2020–2022); 38th district (2022–present)

Member of the Ventura County Board of Supervisors from the 1st district
- In office January 2001 – December 7, 2020
- Preceded by: Susan Lacey
- Succeeded by: Matt LaVere

Member of the Ventura City Council
- In office 1993–1997

Personal details
- Born: December 31, 1950 (age 75) Indianapolis, Indiana, U.S.
- Party: Democratic
- Spouse: Leslie Ogden
- Children: 4
- Education: Brown University; Butler University (MA)

Stephen Bennett (born December 31, 1950) is an American activist, educator, and politician serving as a member of the California State Assembly from the 38th district as a member of the Democratic Party. Prior to his tenure in the state legislature, he was active in local politics in Ventura, California, and Ventura County, California, with him serving on the city council and board of supervisors.

Bennett was born in Indiana, and educated at Brown University and Butler University. He worked as an educator at Calabasas High School and Nordhoff High School before moving to Ventura. He became active in local politics in Ventura by working with the Voters for Alternate Sites and serving as a leader of the Alliance for Ventura's Future.

He was elected to the Ventura city council in 1993, after an unsuccessful write-in candidacy in 1991, and served until 1997. Following his tenure in the city council he served on the county board of supervisors. During his tenure on the board of supervisors he served as chair and he ran a campaign for a seat in the United States House of Representatives, but withdrew. Bennett was elected to the state house in the 2020 election.

== Early life and education ==
Steve Bennett was born in Indianapolis, Indiana, on December 31, 1950. He graduated from Brown University with an honours degree in economics in 1972, and graduated from Butler University with a master's degree in education in 1976. He worked as a high school teacher who taught economics and American history for twenty years at Calabasas High School and Nordhoff High School. He married Leslie Ogden, with whom he had four children, and moved to Ventura, California. Bennett later led the counseling department and worked as assistant principal at Nordhoff High School after leaving the city council. He admires Harry S. Truman and William Jennings Bryan as his political heroes.

== Career ==
=== Activism ===
In the 1990s Bennett served as the spokesman for the Voters for Alternate Sites organization which opposed the construction of a new campus by the California State University near the Robert Taylor Ranch. He also worked as one of the leaders of the Alliance for Ventura's Future which aided in the election of three candidates to the Ventura city council. He later served as president of the Alliance for Ventura's Future.

=== Ventura City Council ===
Bennett ran for one of three seats on the Ventura city council as a write-in candidate in 1991, and placed fifth out of eighteen candidates. During the campaign he had been endorsed by Patagonia, Inc. and the Ventura Sierra Club. Bennett won election to the Ventura city council after placing second in the 1993 election and during the campaign he spent $21,487. He served on the city council until 1997, when he announced that he would not seek reelection due to a campaign promise to only serve one term.

Bennett nominated Gary Tuttle, a member of the city council, to serve as mayor in 1995, and initially supported him, but after Jack Tingstrom won the position of mayor by a vote of five to two a second vote was requested by Bennett and Tuttle so that they could unanimously support Tingstrom. During the 1996 presidential election Bennett seconded a motion to allow Republican vice-presidential candidate Jack Kemp to use Ventura's city hall for a rally in the name of "bipartisanship".

=== Ventura County Board of Supervisors ===
Susan Lacey, a member of the Ventura County Board of Supervisors, retired from her position. Bennett announced that he would seek election to the seat on April 7, 1999. Bennett won the initial election against Jim Monahan and Rosa Lee Measures and then defeated Monahan in the runoff election. He announced on June 9, 2003, that he would seek reelection and won reelection in the 2004 election against Jeffrey Ketelsen. He won reelection without opposition in 2008. Bennett defeated Bob Roper, Christy Weir, and Neal Andrews in the initial election in 2012, and defeated Roper in the runoff election. He defeated Dave Grau in the 2016 election. Bennett was unable to seek reelection as supervisor for a sixth term due to term limits that were implemented in 2008. Matt LaVere, the mayor of Ventura, was elected to succeed Bennett.

During his tenure he served as chair of the Ventura County Board of Supervisors multiple times and Kelly Long succeeded him as chair after his last term as chair.

Bennett announced on November 16, 2011, that he would seek election to the United States House of Representatives from California's 26th congressional district, but he announced at the California Democratic Party's state convention that he was withdrawing from the election. Julia Brownley won the seat in the 2012 election.

=== California State Assembly ===
Bennett ran for a seat in the California State Assembly from the California's 37th State Assembly district. He placed second in the primary behind Republican Charles W. Cole and ahead of Democratic candidates Cathy Murillo, Jonathan Abboud, Jason Dominguez, Elsa Granados, and Stephen Blum. He defeated Cole in the general election.

During Bennett's tenure in the state house he served on the Budget, Education, Elections, Privacy and Consumer Protection, Rules, and Water, Parks, and Wildlife committees.

Bennett is a member of the California Legislative Progressive Caucus.

== Political positions ==
In 1994, the Ventura city council voted, with Bennett voting in favor, in favor of a resolution opposing Proposition 187, which would not allow illegal immigrants to have access to healthcare or education. In 1995, the city council voted four to three, with Bennett voting in favor, in favor of having the Ventura city attorney file a brief in support of the city council of Santa Barbara, California's appeal of a federal court ruling. The ruling declared that an eight-foot bubble ordinance outside family planning clinics was unconstitutional. In 1997, the city council voted three to three, with Bennett voting against, on legislation that would have implemented term limits on people serving on Ventura's fourteen boards, commissions, and committees.

=== Campaign finance ===
Bennett, who had refused to accept donations above $100 during his city council campaign, proposed legislation to limit campaign contributions to $100, but the city council voted four to two against it. He requested that the campaign contribution limit be placed onto the ballot as a proposition by the city council and the placement was approved by a vote of five to two. The League of Women Voters, Common Cause, Sierra Club, and Voters Coalition of Ventura aided Bennett in the writing of the proposition. The proposition limited campaign donations to $100, but allowed it to be $200 if the candidate agreed to limit their spending to $20,000. Bennett's Measure H was passed by voters in the election.

The city council voted five to two, with Bennett against, in favor of repealing legislation that prevented organized groups from donating money to candidates. Bennett announced on August 25, 1997, that he would push for a ballot initiative to the 1998 ballot to prohibit organized groups from donating to candidates. However, he later stated that a proposition was unnecessary after the city council voted to require PACs to report all contributions above $25.

During his campaign for a seat on the board of supervisors in the 2000 election he limited individual campaign donations to his campaign to $500.

Ventura County had legislation passed in 1991, which limited campaign contributions to $750 during primaries and $250 during general elections and was changed following the passage of a state law in 1996, but when the state law was found unconstitutional the county's law was invalidated too. Bennett proposed legislation while serving on the board of supervisors to create an eleven-member ethics panel, with all members of the board of supervisors, the district attorney, sheriff, assessor, auditor-controller, treasurer-tax collector, and county clerk-recorder serving on the panel, to enforce the legislation. Individual donors would be limited to donating $500 per candidate and campaign spending would be limited to $75,000.

In 2003, he and Supervisor Kathy Long proposed legislation that would limit campaign spending for supervisors to $150,000 and limit spending for countywide officials to $500,000. Their legislation also limited donations to $600 who accepted campaign spending limits while the limit would be $300 for those who did not. The legislation was approved by the board of supervisors by a vote of four to one.

=== Economics ===
Bennett stated that "no way would I support cutting the police budget" during discussion on the city budget and he stated that he was comfortable cutting $100,000 from other areas of the budget. In 2001, Bennett gave support to and voted for increasing the minimum wage to $8 per hour with medical benefits or $10 per hour without medical benefits. Bennett called for the board of supervisors to pass a resolution in support of prohibiting new federal leasing for offshore oil and gas drilling.

In 2024, Bennett authored legislation to prohibit the commercial farming of octopuses in California, citing ethical concerns around octopus sentience and intelligence, animal welfare, and the environment. The legislation was signed by Governor Gavin Newsom in September 2024, making California the second state to prohibit octopus farming after Washington enacted a ban earlier that year.

== Electoral history ==
=== Ventura City Council ===
1991 Ventura, California city council election
Party	Candidate	Votes	%
Nonpartisan	Greg Carson	11,019	21.24%
Nonpartisan	Jack Tingstrom	8,345	16.09%
Nonpartisan	Tom Buford	8,070	15.56%
Nonpartisan	Don Villeneuve	6,193	11.94%
Nonpartisan	Steve Bennett (write-in)	5,315	10.25%
Nonpartisan	Jamie Steward-Bentley	2,617	5.04%
Nonpartisan	S. R. Wyatt	1,986	3.83%
Nonpartisan	Donald R. Boyd	1,288	2.48%
Nonpartisan	Bob Van Der Valk	1,207	2.33%
Nonpartisan	Andrew M. Hicks	1,147	2.21%
Nonpartisan	Keith Burns	1,018	1.96%
Nonpartisan	Marcum Patrick	825	1.59%
Nonpartisan	Kenneth Vernie Jordan	625	1.20%
Nonpartisan	John T. Sudak	565	1.09%
Nonpartisan	Carroll Dean Williams	557	1.07%
Nonpartisan	Alan Berk	449	0.87%
Nonpartisan	Louis J. Cunningham	368	0.71%
Nonpartisan	Brian Lee Rencher	282	0.54%
Total votes		51,876	100.00%

1993 Ventura, California city council election
Party	Candidate	Votes	%
Nonpartisan	Rose L. Measures	14,359	15.86%
Nonpartisan	Steve Bennett	12,220	13.50%
Nonpartisan	James L. Monahan	10,370	11.45%
Nonpartisan	Gary Robert Tuttle	9,842	10.87%
Nonpartisan	Clark Owens	7,555	8.34%
Nonpartisan	Kenneth Michael Schmitz	7,345	8.11%
Nonpartisan	Nancy Cloutier	7,240	8.00%
Nonpartisan	Todd J. Collart	6,408	7.08%
Nonpartisan	Virginia K. Weber	5,493	6.07%
Nonpartisan	Dick Massa	4,157	4.59%
Nonpartisan	Charles E. Kistner Jr.	2,290	2.53%
Nonpartisan	Carroll Dean Williams	1,660	1.83%
Nonpartisan	Neil Demeres-Grey	1,026	1.13%
Nonpartisan	Brian Lee Rencher	510	0.56%
Write-in		65	0.07%
Total votes		90,540	100.00%

=== Ventura County Board of Supervisors ===
2000 Ventura County, California Board of Supervisors 1st district election
Party	Candidate	Votes	%
Nonpartisan	Steve Bennett	17,580	44.19%
Nonpartisan	Jim Monahan	12,555	31.56%
Nonpartisan	Rosa Lee Measures	9,479	23.83%
Write-in		165	0.41%
Total votes		39,779	100.00%

2000 Ventura County, California Board of Supervisors 1st district election runoff
Party	Candidate	Votes	%
Nonpartisan	Steve Bennett	36,115	62.62%
Nonpartisan	Jim Monahan	21,323	36.97%
Write-in		234	0.41%
Total votes		57,672	100.00%

2004 Ventura County, California Board of Supervisors 1st district election
Party	Candidate	Votes	%
Nonpartisan	Steve Bennett (incumbent)	25,621	75.95%
Nonpartisan	Jeffrey Ketelsen	7,706	22.84%
Write-in		405	1.20%
Total votes		33,732	100.00%

2008 Ventura County, California Board of Supervisors 1st district election
Party	Candidate	Votes	%
Nonpartisan	Steve Bennett (incumbent)	20,593	96.91%
Write-in		657	3.09%
Total votes		21,250	100.00%

2012 Ventura County, California Board of Supervisors 1st district election
Party	Candidate	Votes	%
Nonpartisan	Steve Bennett (incumbent)	13,000	44.25%
Nonpartisan	Bob Roper	8,177	27.83%
Nonpartisan	Christy Weir	4,472	15.22%
Nonpartisan	Neal Andrews	3,728	12.69%
Total votes		29,377	100.00%

2012 Ventura County, California Board of Supervisors 1st district election runoff
Party	Candidate	Votes	%
Nonpartisan	Steve Bennett (incumbent)	33,559	67.22%
Nonpartisan	Bob Roper	29,756	32.78%
Total votes		63,315	100.00%

2016 Ventura County, California Board of Supervisors 1st district election
Party	Candidate	Votes	%
Nonpartisan	Steve Bennett (incumbent)	26,633	58.87%
Nonpartisan	Dave Grau	18,604	41.13%
Total votes		45,237	100.00%

=== California State Assembly ===
2020 California State Assembly 37th district election
Primary election
Party	Candidate	Votes	%
Republican	Charles W. Cole	41,945	27.54%
Democratic	Steve Bennett	37,516	24.63%
Democratic	Cathy Murillo	29,498	19.37%
Democratic	Jonathan Abboud	12,039	7.91%
Democratic	Jason Dominguez	11,177	7.34%
Democratic	Elsa Granados	10,840	7.12%
Democratic	Stephen Blum	9,278	6.09%
Total votes		152,293	100.00%
General election
Democratic	Steve Bennett	166,015	67.57%
Republican	Charles W. Cole	79,661	32.43%
Total votes		245,676	100.00%
Democratic hold			

2022 California State Assembly 38th district election
Primary election
Party	Candidate	Votes	%
Democratic	Steve Bennett (incumbent)	54,690	59.74%
Republican	Cole Brucato	33,352	36.43%
No party preference	Daniel Wilson	3,506	3.83%
Total votes		91,548	100.00%
General election
Democratic	Steve Bennett (incumbent)	79,709	61.20%
Republican	Cole Brucato	50,544	38.80%
Total votes		130,253	100.00%
Democratic hold			

2024 California State Assembly 38th district election
Primary election
Party	Candidate	Votes	%
Democratic	Steve Bennett (incumbent)	51,657	61.58%
Republican	Deborah Baber	32,233	38.42%
Total votes		83,890	100.00%
General election
Democratic	Steve Bennett (incumbent)	117,387	63.37%
Republican	Deborah Baber	67,845	36.63%
Total votes		185,232	100.00%
Democratic hold			
