= Tricia Takasugi =

News Anchor

- Born: Tricia Ann Takasugi; March 2, 1961 (age 65); Oxnard, California, U.S.
- Education: UCLA
- Occupation: News Reporter
- Employer: KTTV/KCOP-TV
- Parent(s): Nao Takasugi; Judy Takasugi

Tricia Ann Takasugi (born March 2, 1961, in Oxnard, California) is a Japanese-American general assignment reporter for KTTV Fox 11 in Los Angeles.

== Biography ==
Takasugi was born in Oxnard, California, one of five children born to the late Nao Takasugi and his wife Judy. She graduated from UCLA in 1988 with a Bachelor of Arts degree in Spanish.

Takasugi began her broadcasting career as a general assignment reporter at KABC-TV in Los Angeles, during the late 1980s and early 1990s. In the mid-1990s, Takasugi began working for KTTV FOX 11 as a general assignment reporter. After FOX purchased local station KCOP-TV, Takasugi began reporting for both stations.

== Family Guy ==
The female Asian reporter from Fox's "Family Guy," Tricia Takanawa, is believed to be a parody of her.
