= Rex M. Cunningham =

American politician

Member of the California State Assembly from the 37th district
- In office January 3, 1955 – January 7, 1963
- Preceded by: John B. Cooke
- Succeeded by: Burt M. Henson

Personal details
- Born: November 19, 1907 Iola, Kansas
- Died: January 12, 1969 (aged 61)
- Party: Democratic
- Spouse: Aileen Ann Allen (m. 1931)
- Children: 1

Military service
- Branch/service: United States Army
- Battles/wars: World War II

Rex M. Cunningham (November 19, 1907 – January 12, 1969) served in the California State Assembly for the 37th district. During World War II he also served in the United States Army.
