= Monique Limón =

American politician from California

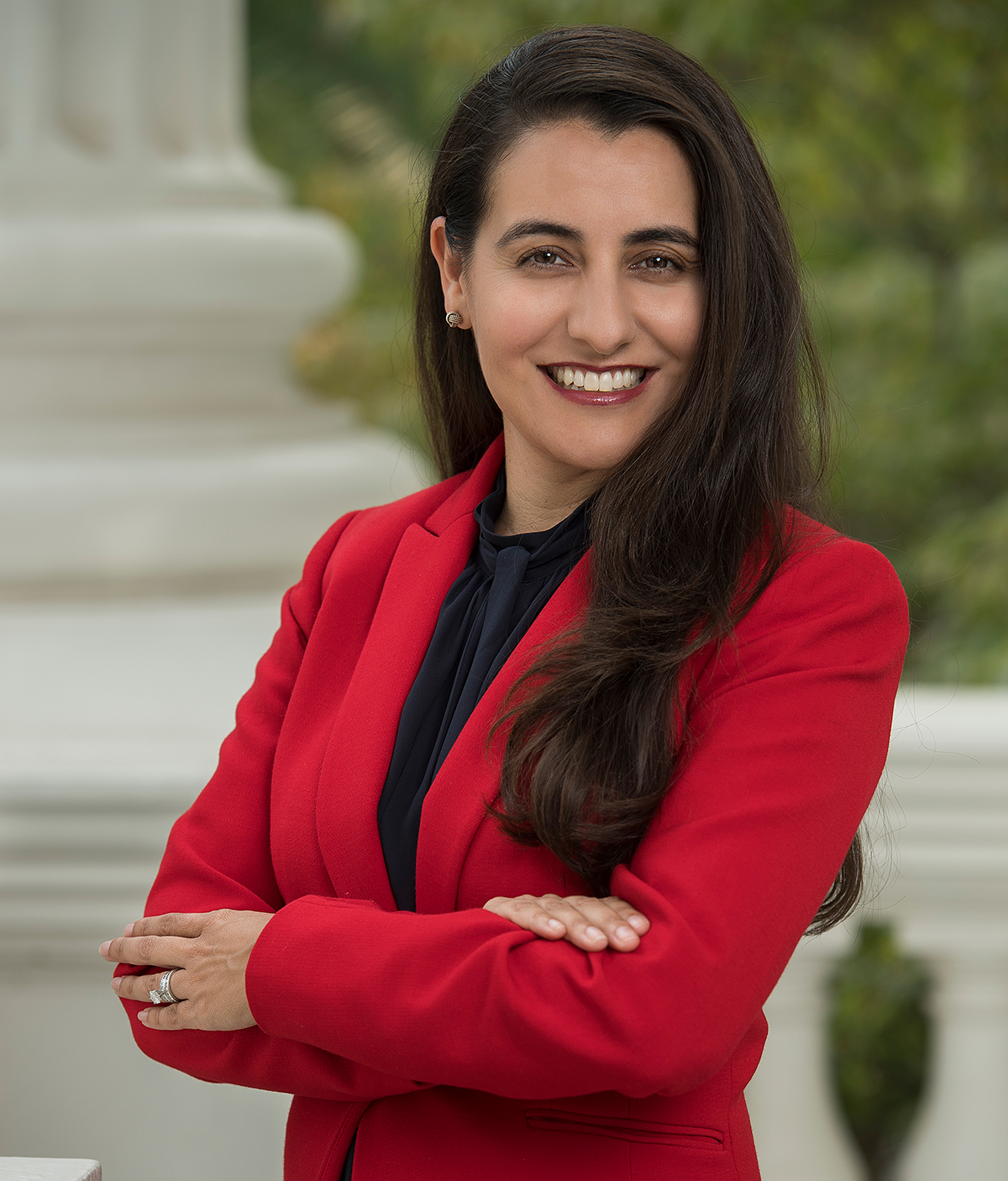
- Official portrait, 2020

President pro tempore of the California State Senate
- Incumbent
- Assumed office November 17, 2025
- Preceded by: Mike McGuire

Member of the California State Senate
- Incumbent
- Assumed office December 7, 2020
- Preceded by: Hannah-Beth Jackson
- Constituency: 19th district (2020–2024); 21st district (2024–present)

Member of the California State Assembly from the 37th district
- In office December 5, 2016 – November 30, 2020
- Preceded by: Das Williams
- Succeeded by: Steve Bennett

Personal details
- Born: October 30, 1979 (age 47) Santa Barbara, California, U.S.
- Party: Democratic
- Spouse: Michael Medel
- Education: University of California, Berkeley (BA); Columbia University (MA)
- Website: State Senate website

Monique Limón (born October 30, 1979) is an American politician serving as the President pro tempore of the California State Senate. She is a member of the Democratic Party representing the 21st Senate District, which encompasses all of Santa Barbara County, a little over 60% of the population of Ventura County, and roughly 20% of the population of San Luis Obispo County.

== Early life and education ==
Limón was born and raised in Santa Barbara, California, the daughter of immigrants from Mexico. She earned a Bachelor of Arts degree from University of California, Berkeley and a Master of Arts from Columbia University.

== Career ==
She served six years on the Santa Barbara Unified School District Board of Education. Additionally, she served in the capacity of Assistant Director for the McNair Scholars Program at the University of California, Santa Barbara prior to serving in the Assembly.

She is a former member of the Santa Barbara County Commission for Women.

== California State Legislature ==
=== California State Assembly ===
In 2016, Limón was elected to the California State Assembly to succeed Das Williams, who ran for the Santa Barbara County Board of Supervisors.

In 2017, Jerry Brown signed Limón's bill to develop a model Native American studies curriculum to be integrated in California high schools.

=== California State Senate ===
In 2020, Limón ran for the California State Senate's 19th district and was elected to succeed Hannah-Beth Jackson, who was ineligible to run due to term limits.

In 2023, she introduced a bill to expand prescribed grazing as a wildfire prevention measure. The next year, she introduced a bill to expand the approval process for prescribed burning.

Limón sponsored a bill to make voter registration automatic at California DMVs; however, Gavin Newsom vetoed the bill in 2024, citing the additional costs it would entail.

On June 9, 2025, the Senate Democratic caucus unanimously voted to promote Limón as president pro tem, succeeding Mike McGuire. She is the first woman of color to hold the position.

As a leader of the State Senate, Limón has passed and supported policies that aim to boost the housing supply in California to help combat the ongoing affordability crisis. She authored SB 676 to ensure communities recovering from wildfire-declared emergencies can access the same rebuilding review procedures available to large-scale infrastructure projects. She also supported dozens of housing bills in the Senate, including SB 827, which increases housing production in high-transit areas. Additionally, Limón supported SB 684, which expands access to home ownership in infill developments.

On June 17, 2026, Limón became the first Latina Senate President pro Tempore in California history to sign legislation into law as Acting Governor.

==== Opposition to housing ====
In 2025, she sought to prevent an eight-story apartment building with 270 housing units (including 54 units for low-income residents) from being constructed in her affluent district. She pushed for language to Senate Bill 158, legislation intended to increase housing supply amid a housing shortage in California, that specifically prohibited the proposed apartment building in her district. Limón's attempt to stymie housing construction in her district came amid a larger push by other California legislators to increase housing supply to alleviate California's housing crisis.

== Electoral history ==
=== 2016 ===
2016 California State Assembly 37th district election
Primary election
Party	Candidate	Votes	%
Democratic	Monique Limón	83,862	65.9
No party preference	Edward Fuller	43,420	34.1
Total votes		127,282	100.0
General election
Democratic	Monique Limón	128,344	64.1
No party preference	Edward Fuller	71,944	35.9
Total votes		200,288	100.0
Democratic hold			

=== 2018 ===
2018 California State Assembly 37th district election
Primary election
Party	Candidate	Votes	%
Democratic	Monique Limón (incumbent)	69,382	84.3
Democratic	David L. Norrdin	7,487	9.1
Democratic	Sofia Collin	5,409	6.6
Total votes		82,278	100.0
General election
Democratic	Monique Limón (incumbent)	129,535	80.4
Democratic	David L. Norrdin	31,522	19.6
Total votes		161,057	100.0
Democratic hold			

=== 2020 ===
2020 California State Senate 19th district election
Primary election
Party	Candidate	Votes	%
Democratic	Monique Limón	152,745	61.1
Republican	Gary Michaels	82,466	33.0
No party preference	Anastasia Stone	14,734	5.9
Total votes		249,945	100.0
General election
Democratic	Monique Limón	272,442	64.5
Republican	Gary Michaels	150,089	35.5
Total votes		422,531	100.0
Democratic hold			

=== 2024 ===
2024 California State Senate 21st district election
Primary election
Party	Candidate	Votes	%
Democratic	Monique Limón (incumbent)	127,979	61.9
Republican	Elijah Mack	78,816	38.1
Total votes		206,795	100.0
General election
Democratic	Monique Limón (incumbent)	260,656	63.3
Republican	Elijah Mack	151,365	36.7
Total votes		412,021	100.0
Democratic hold			

California Senate
Preceded by Mike McGuire	President pro tempore of the California State Senate; 2025–present	Incumbent
