= Pismo =

Pismo may refer to:

- The town of Pismo Beach, California
  - The Pismo State Beach near Pismo Beach
  - Rancho Pismo
- The Pismo clam
- A code name for the fourth version of the PowerBook G3
