= Pismo State Beach =

State park in California, United States

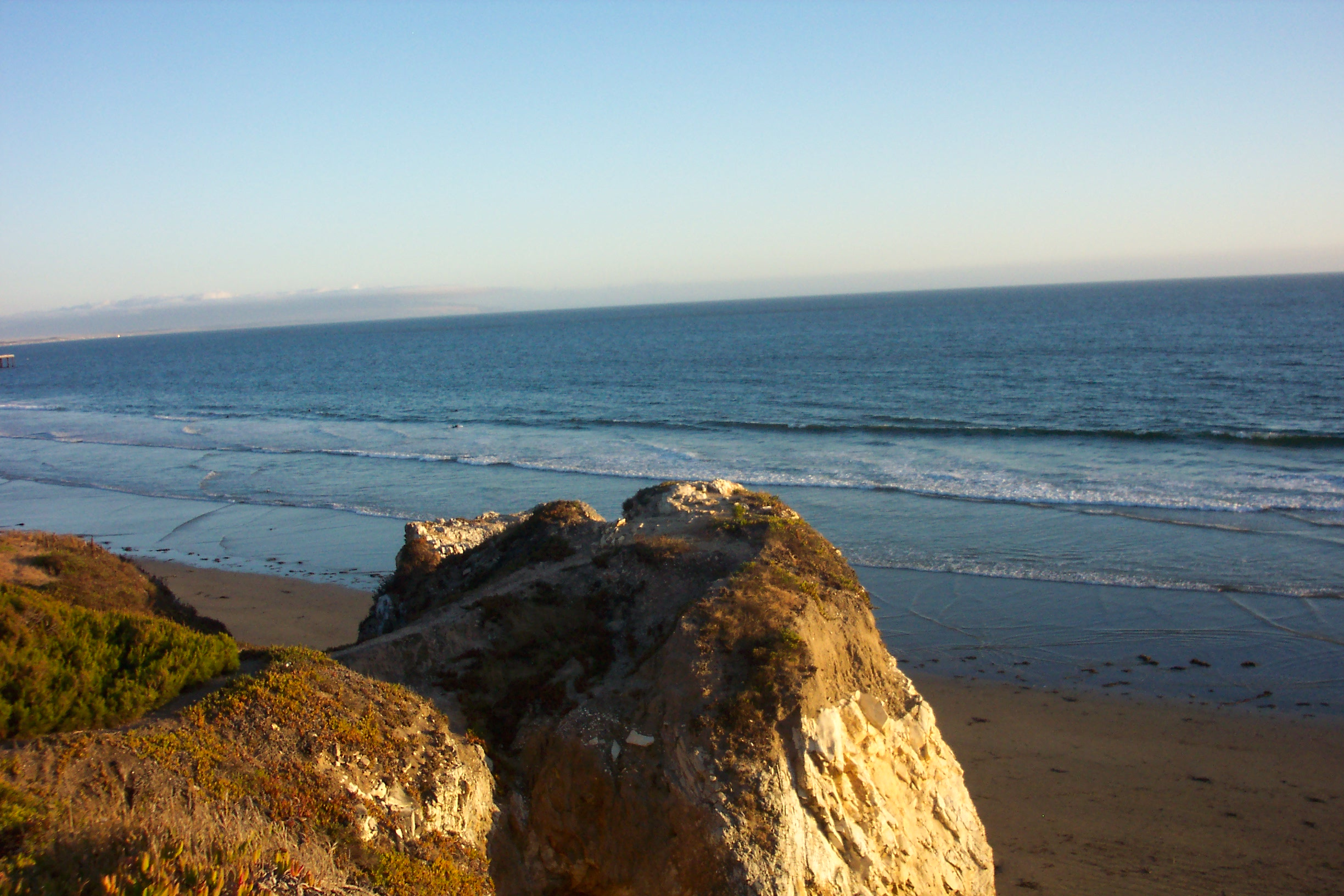

- Location within California Location within the United States
- Location: San Luis Obispo County, California
- Nearest city: Pismo Beach, California
- Coordinates: 35°6′37″N 120°37′53″W
- Area: 1,050 acres (4.2 km^{2})
- Governing body: California Department of Parks and Recreation
- Website: www.parks.ca.gov?page_id=595

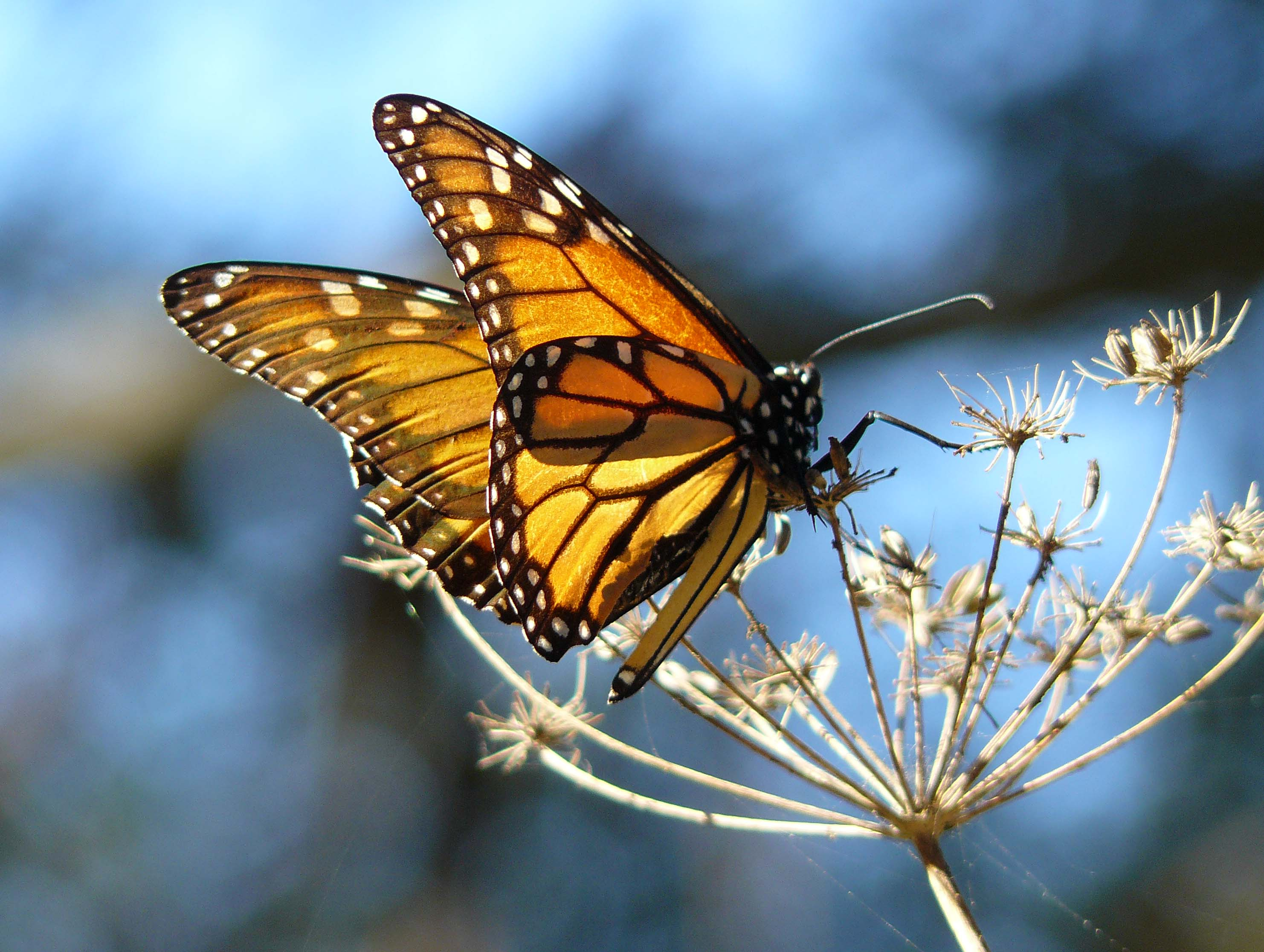
Monarch butterfly at the Pismo Butterfly Grove

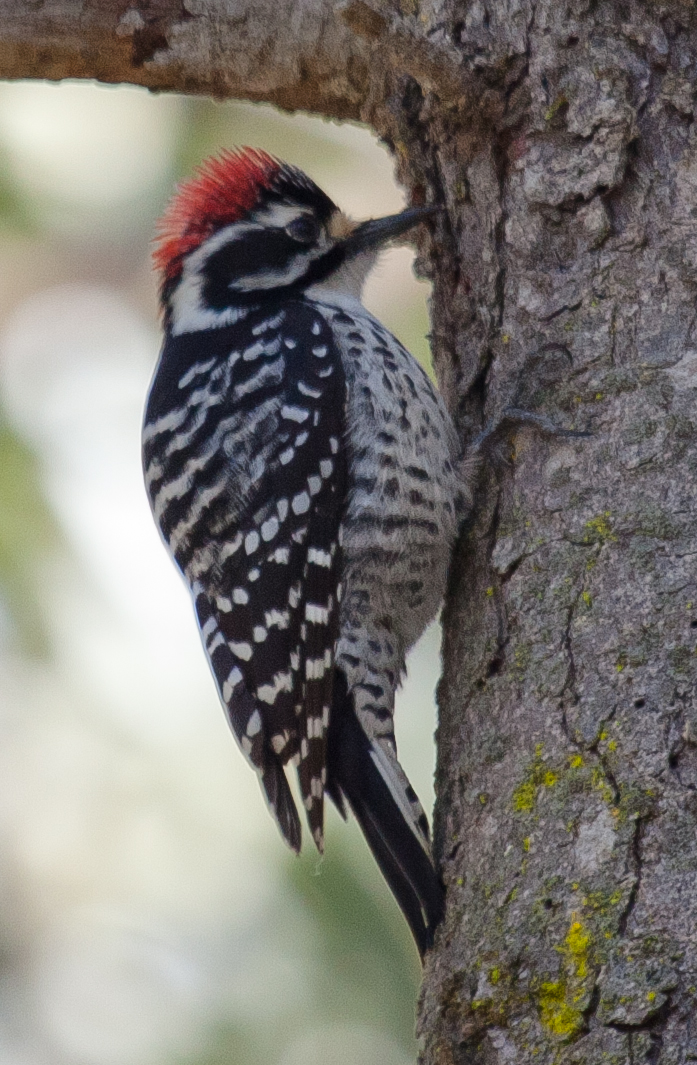
Nuttall's woodpecker at Pismo Beach, near the butterfly grove

Pismo State Beach is a beach on the Pacific coast in the U.S. state of California. It is approximately 17 miles long and fronts the towns of Pismo Beach, Grover Beach, and Oceano in San Luis Obispo County. It is managed by the California Department of Parks and Recreation.

The area includes a beach and dunes.

== Recreational uses ==
The beach offers many attractions such as camping, hiking, swimming, surfing, and fishing, and is home to the Pismo clam. It is a popular place to bird watch and is one of the largest over-wintering colony of monarch butterflies in the U.S.

The Cal Poly Mustangs women's beach volleyball team has used the beach for home beach volleyball matches.

== Animal and plant life ==
The beach is home to many forms of marine life, such as abalone, sea anemones, crabs, kelp, and sea urchins. Several types of birds also live at the beach, such as the brown pelican, great blue heron.

A large monarch butterfly population winters over at the Pismo Beach Monarch Butterfly Grove. It is popular to view the monarch migration from November to February.

== Pismo Beach/ Oceano Dunes District Visitor Center ==
The Visitor Center is located in Oceano Campground at Pismo State Beach. Operated by Ca State Parks, the center features exhibits about the park's Natural, Cultural and Recreational history. Education programs are offered for campers, schools and group organizations, and lead guided walks. There is also a gift shop.

== See also ==
- List of beaches in California
  - California State Beaches
- List of California state parks
