= Rancho Huasna =

Land grant in California

Coordinates: 35.100°N 120.360°W

Rancho Huasna was a 22,153-acre (89.65 km^{2}) Mexican land grant in present-day San Luis Obispo County, California given in 1843 by Governor Manuel Micheltorena to Isaac J. Sparks. The grant extended along the Huasna River and the western slope of the Santa Lucia Range, east of present-day Arroyo Grande and encompassing Huasna.

== History ==
Isaac Sparks (1804–1867) was born in Maine. He arrived in Los Angeles in 1832, and by 1848 had established a large otter trapping and merchant business in Santa Barbara. In 1836, he married Maria De Los Remedios Josefa Eayrs (1813–1893), daughter of sea captain George Washington Eayrs (1775–1855). They had three surviving daughters: Manuela Flora Sparks (1846–1933) who married Irish sea captain Marcus Harloe (1833–1908) in 1866; Maria Rosa Sparks (1851–1933) who married Arza Porter (1838 –1899) in 1870; and Norberta Sallie Sparks (1854–1930) who married Frederick K. Harkness (1852–1905) in 1874.

Sparks was granted the five-square-league Rancho Huasna in 1843 and bought Rancho Pismo from José Ortega in 1846. He never lived at Rancho Huasna, preferring instead to be closer to his business holdings in Santa Barbara. Rancho Huasna was managed by the Englishman John Price, who later acquired Rancho Pismo from Sparks.

With the cession of California to the United States following the Mexican-American War, the 1848 Treaty of Guadalupe Hidalgo provided that the land grants would be honored. As required by the Land Act of 1851, a claim for Rancho Huasna was filed with the Public Land Commission in 1852, and the grant was patented to Isaac J. Sparks in 1879.

On Sparks' death in 1867, Rancho Huasna was divided among his three daughters: Manuela Flora Sparks de Harloe, Maria Rosa Sparks de Porter, and Norberta Sallie Sparks de Harkness.

== See also ==
- Ranchos of California
- List of Ranchos of California
