= John Price House =

Historic house in California, United States

- U.S. National Register of Historic Places
- U.S. Historic district
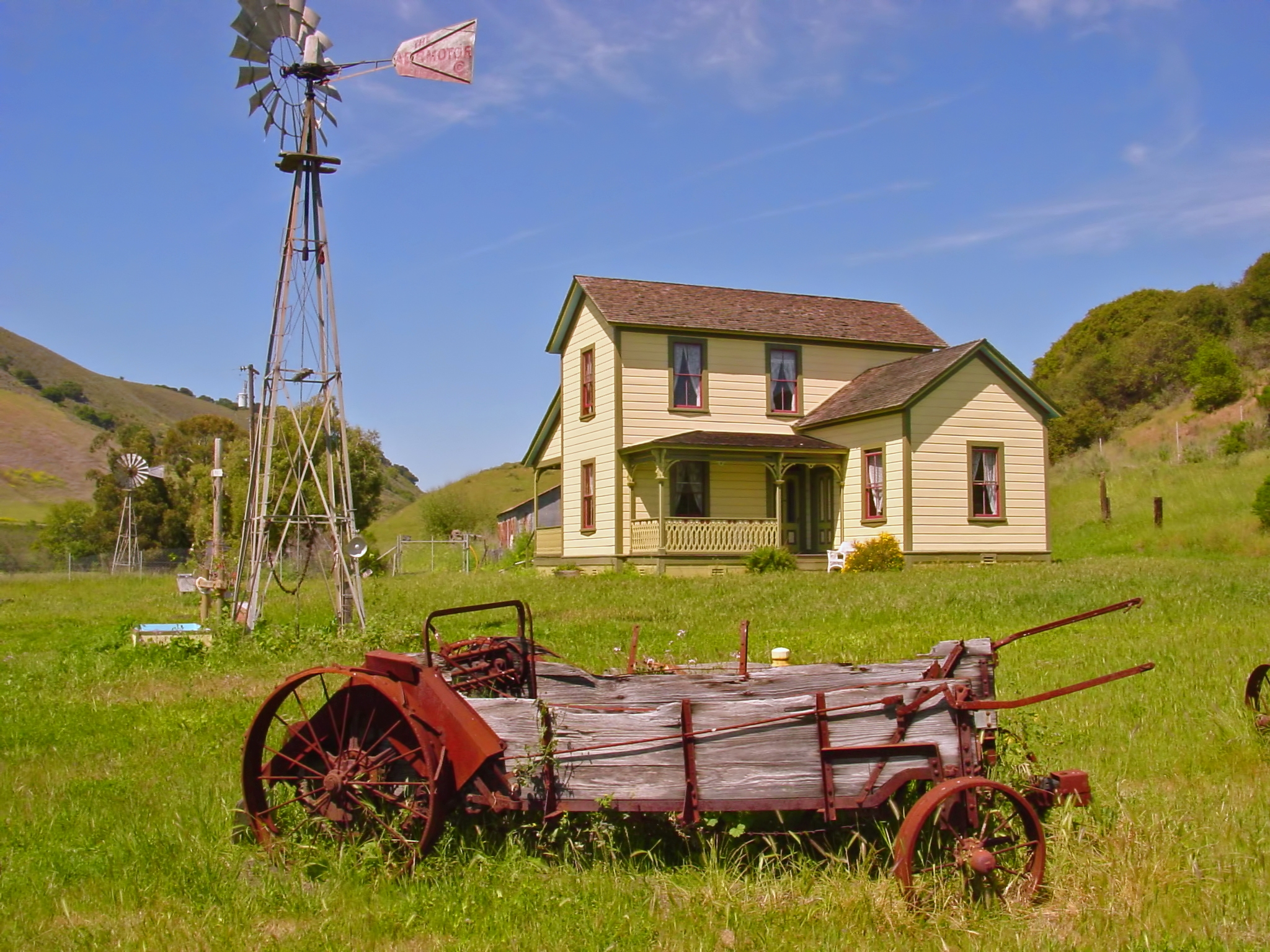

- Location within California Location within the United States
- Nearest city: Pismo Beach, California
- Coordinates: 35°8′52″N 120°38′20″W
- Area: 4 acres (1.6 ha)
- Built: 1893–94
- Built by: Lawrence, L.A.
- NRHP reference No.: 88002013
- Added to NRHP: November 3, 1988

The John Price House, also known as the Price Anniversary House, is a historic house in Pismo Beach, California. Built from 1893 to 1894 for city founder John Michael Price, the house is the oldest building in Pismo Beach. The two-story house was designed in a vernacular style. The house's design exhibits Victorian influences and includes a gable roof which originally had ornamental cresting, a porch with decorative woodwork, and decorative window sills. Price, who had purchased the ranch site in 1852, built the house as an anniversary present for his wife. Price lived in the house until his death in 1902.

The house was added to the National Register of Historic Places on November 3, 1988.
