= Monarch butterfly conservation in California =

Aspect of Californian conservation programs

The U.S. state of California has instituted numerous conservation programs, policies, laws, reserves and habitat restoration projects throughout the state to facilitate the health and migration of the western population of the monarch butterfly (Danaus plexippus). A Scientific Collecting Permit (SCP) is required to handle wild monarchs in California including for educational purposes. It is unlawful to collect, remove from the wild and/or captively rear monarchs in California without an SCP.

The population of western monarchs require very different breeding and overwintering habitat when compared to the eastern population of monarch butterflies. They require specific micro-climatic conditions to survive the winter and they are sensitive to habitat changes at the overwintering sites. The large aggregations of butterflies are seen as the most vulnerable at their overwintering locations along the coast. Many monarch overwintering sites are contained within the "coastal zone"; an area defined by the Coastal Zone Management Act to be 1000 yards inland from the high tide mark. Large number of overwintering sites are outside the coastal zone. There are more than 450 overwintering sites in California.

== Habitat conservation ==
Conservationists promote habitat conservation by identifying trees that are necessary for roosting. They suggest that roosting sites be identified and designed to prevent degradation of the area. They also suggest that an environmental impact statement be filed when construction is done near overwintering roasts. Removal of trees within the perimeter of the habitat should be prohibited. Tree maintenance should be performed by experts in the field. They propose that it should be unlawful to remove trees, under-story plants and vegetation near roosting sites. Reforestation efforts should be instituted. Erosion control needs to be taken into account to maintain suitable habitat. Conservationists suggest that wood-burning fireplaces and structures should not be built near roosting sites.

The International Environmental Law project issued a policy statement regarding eucalyptus management at monarch overwintering sites. This group recognizes the wide variety of tree species that monarchs utilize in their overwintering roosts. The Xerxes society recommends that eucalyptus trees remain unmolested, if monarchs roost on the trees.

=== Proposed conservation measures ===
The International Environmental Law Project of 2012 has proposed model legislation and recommends the following:

- Amend the California Fish and game regulations to authorize the California Department of Fish and game to regulate the monarch butterfly.
- Amend the California endangered species act to include the monarch butterfly.
- Amend the coastal act to specifically recognize overwintering sites as needing special protection.
- Continue discussion via the Trilateral Committee for Wildlife and Ecosystem Conservation and Management Summit to organize continent wide conservation actions.
- Limiting activities at the overwintering sites (logging, tourism).
- Mass planting of milkweed and nectar plants. Concerned individuals governmental agencies, and organizations have made efforts to restore milkweed habitats to provide nectar and food plants.
- Studies that involve the participation of citizen-scientists who monitor and apply tags to migrating monarchs
- Lobbying lawmakers, corporations, highway departments, utilities and policy-makers to preserve habitat.
- The continued acquisition of land for the expressed purpose of monarch conservation.

On December 12, 2024, the United States Fish and Wildlife Service (USFWS) published in the Federal Register a proposed rule that would list the monarch butterfly (Danaus plexippus) as a threatened species and would designate the butterfly's critical habitat per the provisions of the Endangered Species Act. The USFWS estimated in the proposed rule that the probability of extinction in the foreseeable future (60 years) is 56-74 percent for the eastern monarch migratory population and 99 percent for the western migratory population. The proposed rule designated seven areas near California's Pacific coast as "critical habitat units" for monarch butterflies. The USFWS accepted comments on the proposed rule until March 12, 2025. On March 19, 2025, the USFWS reopened the comment period on the proposed rule until May 19, 2025.

=== Habitat restoration ===
Participants in Monarch Watch's waystation program have planted acres of native milkweeds to encourage larval growth for monarchs. These way stations also provide nectaring plants for adult monarchs.

=== Tree management ===
Most locales do not have laws or policies concerning the removal or alteration of trees within a designated monarch overwintering site. Alteration of trees requires a permit in Capitola and Goleta. Studies continue to determine the efficacy of the continued use of eucalyptus trees as roosting trees. Large gaps in the tree canopies at the overwintering sites in California affect the suitability of the roosts.

== Overwintering sites ==
Large number of overwintering sites are outside the coastal zone. There are more than 450 overwintering sites in California documented since the 1980s.

=== California state parks and lands ===
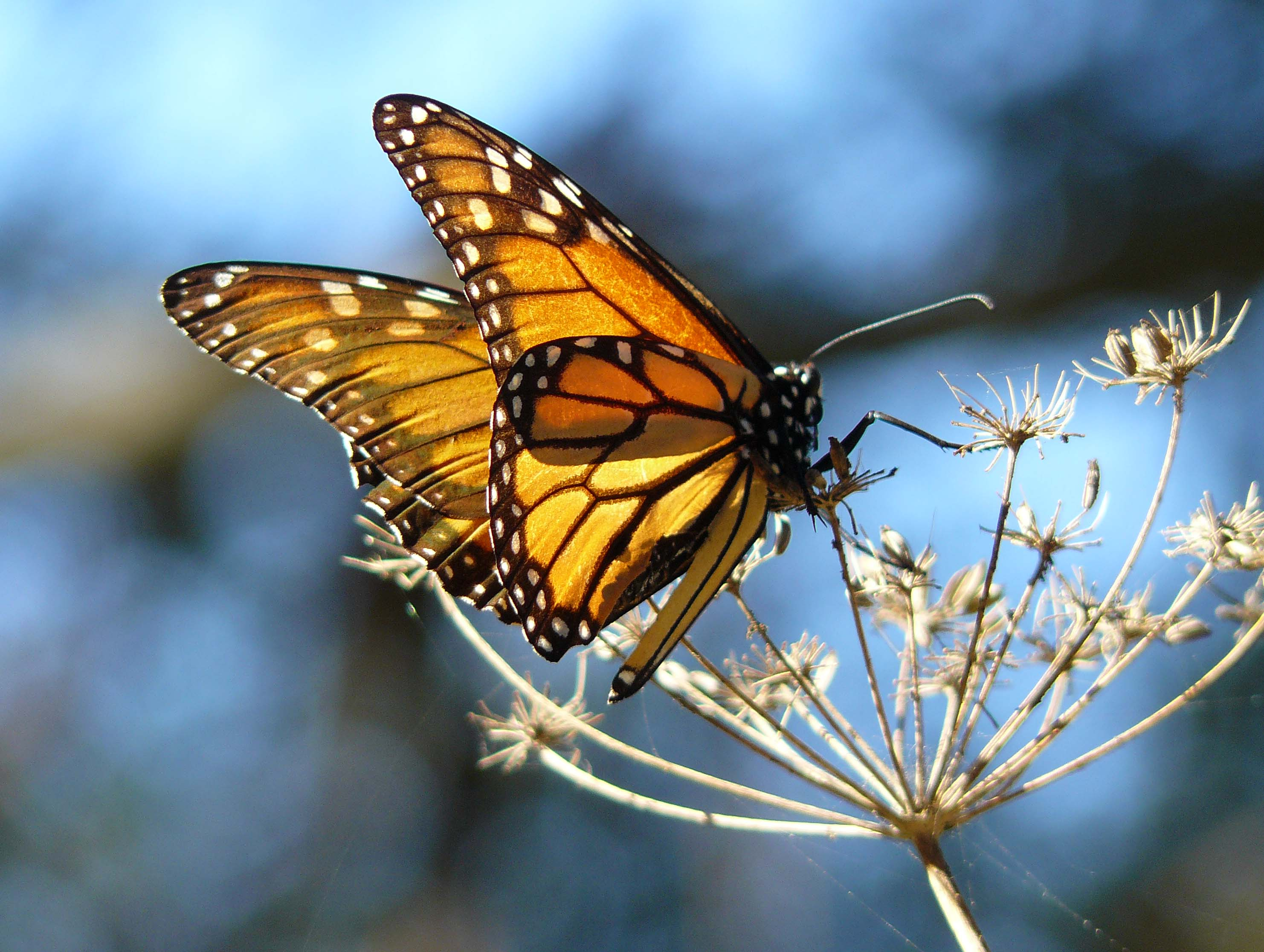
Monarch butterfly resting on fennel, at the Pismo Butterfly Grove, California

Monarchs are protected from the effects of land development, tourism in the 270 California state parks. The activities of visitors to the parks are regulated to include the prohibition of molesting, hunting, disturbing, harming, feeding, touching, teasing, injuring, trapping, taking, netting, poisoning any animal or trees. The collecting, capturing and killing of any animals and the destruction of native vegetation is prohibited in the parks. Overwintering sites occur near beaches, universities and other state lands. State parks do not have specific policies regarding the maintenance of trees on which the monarchs overwinter. California historical sites are exempt from having to create monarch conservation plans.

Twenty state parks contain monarch overwintering groves.

- Andrew Molera State Park: This park is known to consistently support hundreds to thousands of overwintering monarchs. They roost in eucalyptus trees.
- Doheny State Beach: This area contains one small overwintering roost. It once supported hundreds to thousands of butterflies but has declined since 1999. This state area does possess plans to enhance the habitat for the monarch butterfly.
- Gaviota State Park: This park is known for the hundreds to thousands of roosting monarchs in the trees behind the Rangers residences.
- Leo Carrillo State Park: This park supports hundreds to thousands of overwintering monarchs. Monarch protection is in the general plan of the park, "Arroyo Sequit grove (of eucalyptus), along with meal fat scrub nearby, provides significant overwintering habitat for a small population of 1500 to 5000 monarch butterflies…[The monarch] is considered an animal of special concern in California"
- Lighthouse Field State Beach: This park is historically known to have hosted as many as 70,000 monarchs in the late 1990s.
- Montaña de Oro State Park: This park was known to contain three sites of overwintering monarchs numbered in the thousands. Some of the area has been destroyed by fire.
- Morro Bay State Park: This park contains five monarch roosting sites. The golf course in this park supports hundreds to thousands of butterflies every year. The general plan for this park includes the recognition and value of eucalyptus trees and groves mandating protection for these trees.
- Natural Bridges State Beach: This park has one of the largest monarch, roosting sites in the state. Some censuses recorded 120,000 butterflies. This site consistently hosts several thousand monarchs that roost in eucalyptus and Monterey pine trees. This park is the only State Monarch Preserve in California. The general plan for this park is to preserve the monarch as a species.
- New Brighton State Beach: This park consistently has hosted monarchs since the 1970s. The general plan for the park encourages the development of monarch colonies.
- Pismo State Beach: This park consistently hosts tens of thousands of monarchs and the populations here are considered healthy. The general plan for this park is primarily designed to enhance the dunes and beaches.
- Point Mugu State Park: This park has supported hundreds of thousands to monarchs since monitoring began.
- San Onofre State Beach: The state park is in Orange County and the latest count of overwintering monarchs was just 15. There are no plans to restore the site.
- San Simeon State Park: This park once contained overwintering sites, but they were lost due to a natural fire. The general plan for the management of the spark does not include the restoration of monarch overwintering sites.
- Torrey Pines State Natural Reserve: the general plan for this area is to establish native species that were present sixty years before the establishment of the General Plan for the Reserve (1924), at a time that human interaction with the land began to displace native species.

=== Federal lands ===
The habitat of the western population of monarch butterflies is protected from visitors and commercial activities on federal land. Plant collection, animal collection, and the disruption of habitat are not permitted. Federal lands do not possess policies or guidelines regarding the maintenance of trees on which the monarchs overwinter.

Overwintering monarch roosts have been observed at the Los Padres National Forest, Sycamore Canyon, Pruitt Creek, the Marin Headlands, Stinson Beach, Tennessee Valley, Muir Beach, Fort Barry, Fort Baker, and the Point Reyes National Seashore.

Lands are managed by the Department of Defense, Vandenberg Air Force Base and Camp Pendleton are known to host monarch overwintering sites. Monarch butterfly habitat protection does not supersede the land use needs of the military.

=== Other public sites ===
The California Department of Fish and Wildlife has the authority to regulate the collection and habitat changes that affect the monarch. Local ordinances sometimes provide guidelines for monarch conservation and any developmental activity. Local ordinances encourage the removal of non-native species. This is in conflict with the preservation of monarch overwintering sites because monarchs often overwinter in stands of non-native eucalyptus trees. There are some local ordinances that regulate tree removal and cutting.

==== San Francisco Bay area ====
Overwintering monarchs, thousands to tens of thousands have historically roosted at Ardenwood Historic Farm in Fremont. These roosts are protected by County regulations.

The East Bay Regional Park District raises awareness with its monarch educational programs to raise awareness of the wintering butterflies. The East Bay regional Park District has a master plan that "pledges to"identify, evaluate, conserve, enhance, and restore rare, threatened, endangered, or locally important species of plants and animals and their habitats".

==== Los Angeles County ====
Los Angeles County contains at least 44 monarch overwintering roosts. These roosts exist mainly within public parks. The City of Santa Monica, City of Long Beach, and Redondo Beach hosts small sites of overwintering roosts.

==== Mendocino County ====
Mendocino County hosts the northernmost roosting sites of the overwintering monarchs in the southern part of the county, but they are only present for several weeks during the winter. It is considered a transient site.

==== Monterey County ====
Monterey County contains roosts of thousands of butterflies.

Pacific Grove contains two large overwintering sites, including its Monarch Grove Sanctuary. These sites are populated on a consistent basis. The city has passed ordinances specifically designed to protect the monarchs and the trees on which they produced. Tree removal and maintenance is highly regulated.

==== Orange County ====
Huntington Beach contains four monarch overwintering roasts which are located in city-owned parks. The roosts are small but city regulations mandate their protection.

==== San Diego County ====
There is only one roosting site in the Chula Vista containing about 50 individual butterflies. This site is protected by city ordinances.

Overwintering roosts of monarchs have been observed in the city of San Diego since the 1920s. No regulations are in place to protect the monarchs' further habitat destruction.

==== Santa Barbara County ====
Santa Barbara County contains 132 overwintering roosts. These can be found on state or federal land, and public and private property.

Roosts in the city of Carpinteria are near Carpinteria Creek, Recon Creek, the Carpinteria business Park, and the Carpinteria oil and gas plant buffer zone. "Also known as Chevron Park". These roosts contain tens of thousands to thousands of monarchs on a consistent basis. Carpinteria restricts the removal of trees and requires that development be restricted near the trees.

The city of Goleta butterfly counts in recent years have identified tens of thousands of monarchs roosting there. A fire in the past destroyed one of the sites. The overwintering sites in the city of Goleta are protected by relatively rigorous regulations.

== Status ==
California's monarch population declined sharply from 4.5 million in the 1980s. The population initially dropped to nearly 200,000 and had an even greater decrease during 2018. That year, the population fell to nearly 30,000. By November 2020, the population dropped to fewer than 2,000, representing a 99% collapse in three decades.

The Xerces Society for Invertebrate Conservation has issued a brochure identifying priority action zones in California for recovering western monarchs. The brochure identifies measures for restoring monarch populations in each of five zones within the state.

== See also ==
- Animal migration
- Monarch butterfly migration
- Lepidoptera migration
- Lepidoptera
- Butterflies
- Viceroy butterfly
- Butterfly house (conservatory)
- Conservation biology
- Index of conservation articles
