= Huasna, California =

Unincorporated community in California, United States

- Unincorporated community
- Location within California Location within the United States
- Coordinates: 35°07′22″N 120°23′37″W
- Country: United States
- State: California
- County: San Luis Obispo
- Elevation: 797 ft (243 m)
- Time zone: UTC-8 (Pacific (PST))
  - Summer (DST): UTC-7 (PDT)
- Area code: 805
- GNIS feature ID: 1660774

Huasna (Chumash: Awasna) is an unincorporated community in southeastern San Luis Obispo County, California, United States.

Huasna is located on the western slope of the southern Santa Lucia Range. Huasna is due east of Arroyo Grande. The name Huasna derives from wasna, a Chumash village in the vicinity of "the path that climbs up to the sky." According to Chumash narratives, this path is located somewhere in the Huasna region, as recounted in the Story of Anucwa in which sisters journey there. Huasna was later incorporated into Rancho Huasna, granted to Isaac J. Sparks by Governor Manuel Micheltorena in 1843. An adobe ranch house and schoolhouse once stood in the community. The Huasna area was the site of considerable oil exploration in the 1950s, but today the Huasna area is mostly farmland.

The Huasna River runs through the community.

== See also ==
- Rancho Huasna
