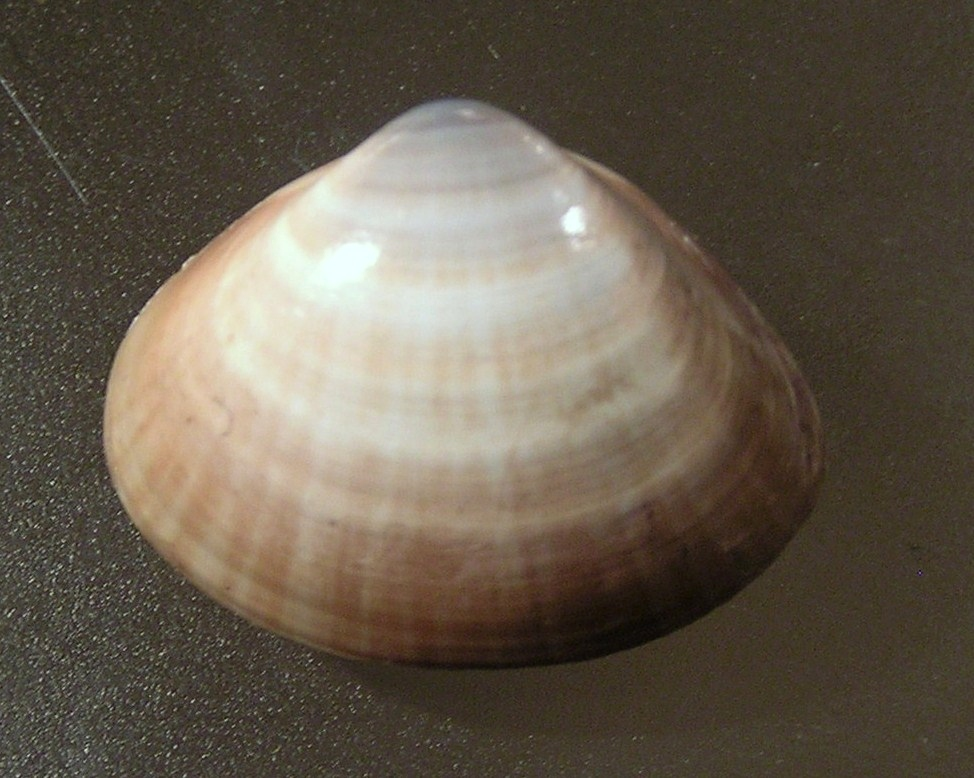
- The outside of one valve of Tivela ponderosa

Scientific classification
- Domain: Eukaryota
- Kingdom: Animalia
- Phylum: Mollusca
- Class: Bivalvia
- Order: Venerida
- Family: Veneridae
- Genus: Tivela; Link, 1815

Species
- See text

Synonyms
- Cytherea (Tivela) Link, 1807; Eutivela Dall, 1891 (junior synonym); Mactra (Trigonella) Conrad, 1837; Meretrix (Eutivela) Dall, 1891 (junior synonym); Pachydesma Conrad, 1854; Planitivela Olsson, 1961; Tivela (Eutivela) Dall, 1891 · alternate representation; Tivela (Pachydesma) Conrad, 1854 · alternate representation; Tivela (Planitivela) Olsson, 1961 · alternate representation; Tivela (Tivela) Link, 1807 · alternate representation; Trigonella Conrad, 1837

= Tivela =

Genus of bivalves

Tivela is a genus of saltwater clams, marine bivalve molluscs in the subfamily Meretricinae of the family Veneridae, the Venus clams.

== Species ==
According to the World Register of Marine Species, the following species are included in the genus Tivela:

- Tivela argentina (G. B. Sowerby I, 1835)
- Tivela bicolor Gray
- Tivela byronensis (Gray, 1838)
- Tivela compressa G.B. Sowerby II, 1851
- Tivela cora Römer, 1864
- Tivela damaoides (W. Wood, 1828)
- Tivela delessertii (G. B. Sowerby II, 1854)
- Tivela dentaria (Lamarck, 1818)
- Tivela dillwyni (Deshayes, 1853)
- Tivela dunkeri Römer, 1864
- Tivela fulminata (Bory de Saint-Vincent, 1827)
- Tivela geijskesi van Regteren Altena, 1968
- Tivela laevigata (J. E. Gray, 1838)
- Tivela lamyi Dautzenberg, 1929
- Tivela lessonii (Deshayes, 1830)
- Tivela lineata (G. B. Sowerby II, 1851)
- Tivela mactroides (Born, 1778)
- Tivela mulawana Biggs, 1969
- Tivela natalensis Dunker, 1858
- Tivela planulata (Broderip & G. B. Sowerby I, 1830)
- Tivela ponderosa (F.C.L. Koch in R.A. Philippi, 1844)
- Tivela rejecta Smith, 1914
- Tivela stefaninii (Nardini, 1933)
- Tivela stultorum (Mawe, 1823)
- Tivela transversa (G. B. Sowerby III, 1897)
- Tivela trigonella (Lamarck, 1818)
- Tivela tripla (Linnaeus, 1767)
- Tivela valae Lussi, 1996
- Tivela zonaria (Lamarck, 1818)

Synonyms

- Tivela abaconis Dall, 1902: synonym of Tivela trigonella (Lamarck, 1818)
- Tivela brasiliana Dall, 1902: synonym of Tivela mactroides (Born, 1778)
- Tivela dolabella G.B. Sowerby II, 1851: synonym of Tivela damaoides (W. Wood, 1828)
- Tivela elegans A. E. Verrill, 1870: synonym of Tivela byronensis (Gray, 1838)
- Tivela floridana Rehder, 1939: synonym of Tivela trigonella (J.B.P.A. Lamarck, 1818)
- Tivela foresti Fischer-Piette & Testud, 1967: synonym of Tivela fulminata (Bory de Saint-Vincent, 1827)
- Tivela hartvigii Dunker, 1879: synonym of Tivela compressa (G. B. Sowerby II, 1851)
- Tivela isabelleana (d'Orbigny, 1846): synonym of Tivela dentaria (Lamarck, 1818)
- Tivela petiti Dautzenberg, 1929: synonym of Tivela transversa (G. B. Sowerby III, 1897)
- Tivela platyaulax (Tomlin, 1924): synonym of Comus platyaulax (Tomlin, 1924)
- Tivela polita G.B. Sowerby II, 1851: synonym of Tivela planulata (Broderip & G. B. Sowerby I, 1830)
- Tivela plathyaulax (Tomlin, 1924): synonym of Comus platyaulax (Tomlin, 1924)
- Tivela rejecta E. A. Smith, 1914, sensu P. G. Oliver, 1995: synonym of Tivela damaoides (W. Wood, 1828) (misapplication)
- Tivela scarificata S. S. Berry, 1940: synonym of Tivela stultorum (Mawe, 1823)
- Tivela subglobosa Dunker, 1864: synonym of Tivela mactroides (Born, 1778) (junior subjective synonym)
- Tivela tomlini Haughton, 1932: synonym of Tivela compressa (G. B. Sowerby II, 1851)
- Tivela trigona Borchert, 1901: synonym of Tivela dentaria (Lamarck, 1818)
- Tivela ventricosa (Gray, 1838): synonym of Tivela zonaria (Lamarck, 1818)
- Tivela vulgaris Link, 1807: synonym of Tivela mactroides (Born, 1778)
