= Tivela bicolor =

Scientific classification
- Kingdom: Animalia
- Phylum: Mollusca
- Class: Bivalvia
- Order: Venerida
- Family: Veneridae
- Genus: Tivela
- Species: T. bicolor

Binomial name
- Tivela bicolor (Gray, 1838)

Species of saltwater clam

Tivela bicolor is a species of saltwater clam belonging to the family Veneridae. It is a type of Bivalvia and is found in marine environments, belonging to the genus Tivela.

== Distribution ==
Confirmed sightings of this species occurred primarily between Western and Southern Africa.
