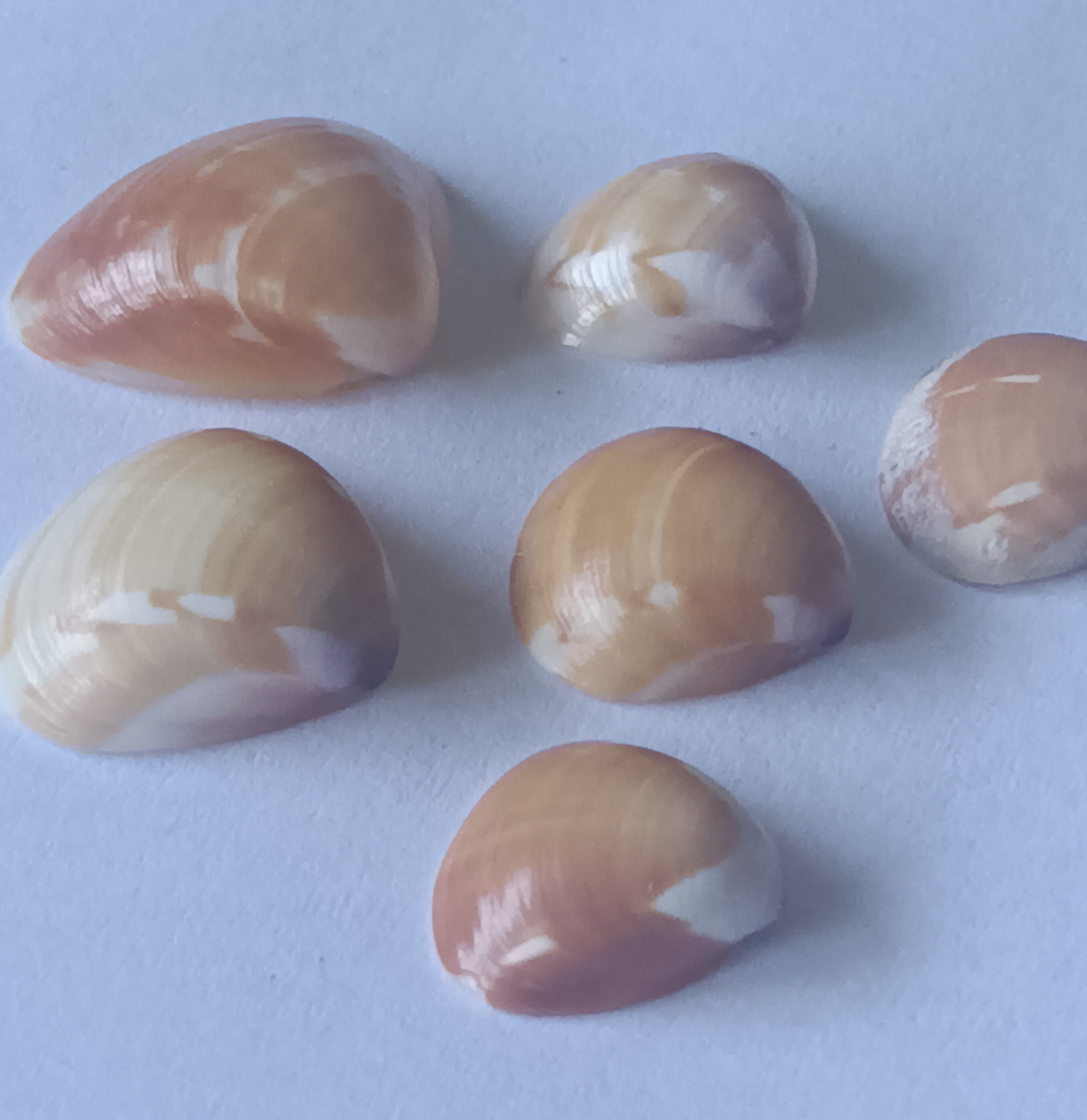
- Several specimens of Tivela byronensis collected in Guatemala

Scientific classification
- Domain: Eukaryota
- Kingdom: Animalia
- Phylum: Mollusca
- Class: Bivalvia
- Order: Venerida
- Family: Veneridae
- Genus: Tivela
- Species: T. byronensis

Binomial name
- Tivela byronensis (Gray, 1838)

Synonyms
- Trigona byronensis J. E. Gray, 1838

= Tivela byronensis =

Species of bivalve

Tivela byronensis is a species of bivalve from the family Veneridae. It was initially described by John Edward Gray in 1838 as Trigona byronensis. It can be found throughout the coasts of the United States to Brazil and Peru.

== Description ==
Tivela byronensis has a cordate trigonal, ventricose shell. It is white with interrupted brown rays and zig-zag brown lines on the slope. Its lunule is white and the interior of the shell is white with purple umbones.

== Distribution and habitat ==
Tivela byronensis' distribution area extends from both Pacific and Atlantic coasts of the United States, Central America and parts of South America. This species lives on sandy beaches and sandy mud seabeds in the intertidal and sublittoral zones.
