= Santa Maria River Fault =

Tectonic fault in California, United States

Santa Maria River Fault is a tectonic fault in Santa Barbara County, California.

It roughly corresponds with the Santa Maria River, until veers south towards Santa Ynez. It passes just north of the city of Santa Maria, California, and lies south of the potentially dangerous Hosgri fault and newly discovered Shoreline Fault.

To the south lies the Santa Ynez Fault system, which this fault is thought to have the potential to interact with.
