= Huasna River =

- Location of the Huasna River in California

Location
- Country: United States
- State: California
- City: Huasna

Physical characteristics
- Source: Confluence of Trout Creek and Stony Creek
  - location: Los Padres National Forest
  - coordinates: 35°12′03″N 120°21′02″W
  - elevation: 897 ft (273 m)
- Mouth: Cuyama River
  - location: Twitchell Reservoir
  - coordinates: 35°00′57″N 120°19′45″W
  - elevation: 535 ft (163 m)
- Length: 18 mi (29 km)
- Basin size: 117 sq mi (300 km^{2})
- Discharge
  - location: Near Santa Maria
  - average: 18.1 cu ft/s (0.51 m^{3}/s)
  - minimum: 0 cu ft/s (0 m^{3}/s)
  - maximum: 11,400 cu ft/s (320 m^{3}/s)

The Huasna River is a stream in the Central Coast region of California, and is a tributary of the Cuyama River. It is formed by the confluence of Trout Creek and Stony Creek, which originate along the crest of the Santa Lucia Range in the Los Padres National Forest. It flows south, past the community of Huasna and the Huasna Valley before reaching Twitchell Reservoir, which is created by a dam along the Cuyama River.

Like most other streams in this part of California, the Huasna River is usually dry, with significant flows only during the winter and early spring. During rare high water levels of Twitchell Reservoir, the lower part of the Huasna Valley may be flooded.

== See also ==
- List of rivers of California
