= Twitchell Reservoir =

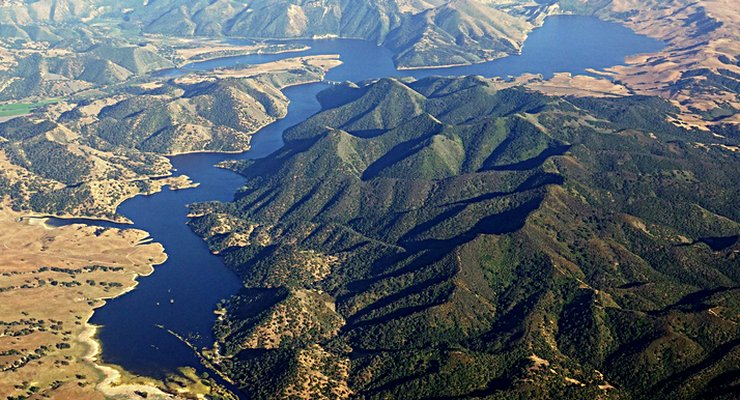
- Aerial view of Twitchell Reservoir

- Location within California Location within the United States
- Location: San Luis Obispo / Santa Barbara counties, California, United States
- Coordinates: 34°59′53″N 120°19′59″W
- Type: Reservoir
- Primary inflows: Cuyama River / Huasna River
- Primary outflows: Terminal (evaporation) / Cuyama River
- Basin countries: United States
- Water volume: 225,000 acre⋅ft (278,000,000 m^{3})
- Surface elevation: 692 ft (211 m)
- References: "Twitchell Reservoir". Geographic Names Information System. United States Geological Survey, United States Department of the Interior.

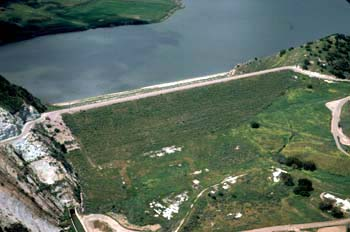
Twitchell Dam and Reservoir

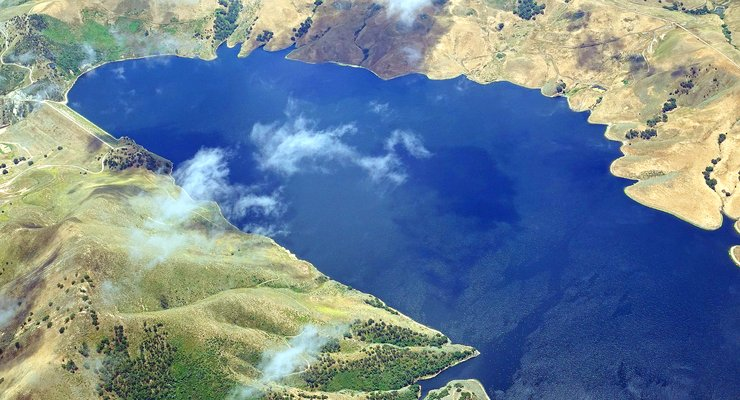
Aerial: Twitchell Dam (top left)

Twitchell Reservoir is a reservoir in southern San Luis Obispo County and northern Santa Barbara County in California. The reservoir has a capacity of 197,756 acre⋅ft (243,928,000 m^{3}) and is formed by Twitchell Dam on the Cuyama River about 66 miles (106 km) from its headwaters in the Chumash Wilderness Area. About 7 miles (11 km) below the dam, outflow joins the Sisquoc River near Garey, CA to form the Santa Maria River.

Twitchell Dam was built by the United States Bureau of Reclamation between 1956 (70 years ago) and 1958 (68 years ago). The original names were Vacquero Dam and Vacquero Reservoir, but they were changed to honor T. A. Twitchell of Santa Maria, a proponent of the project. The dam and reservoir provide flood control and water conservation.

The Central Coast of California only receives significant amounts of rainfall during the winter, this area averaging 14 inches (360 mm) per year. The water is stored in the reservoir during big winter storms and released as quickly as possible while still allowing it to percolate into the soil and recharge the groundwater. This means that the reservoir is usually far from full. It is estimated that the project increases recharge by 20,000 acre⋅ft (25,000,000 m^{3}) annually.

Sedimentation is a problem for the reservoir, as the reservoir is being filled 70 percent faster than expected. This reduces its capacity and blocks the water inlet to the control gates. Some sediment has been removed by flushing it out during releases, but much of it is simply deposited immediately downstream, interfering with flows.

There is no public access to the dam or reservoir.

== See also ==
- List of dams and reservoirs in California
- List of lakes in California
- List of largest reservoirs of California
- List of United States Bureau of Reclamation dams
