= Santa Maria River (California) =

River in California

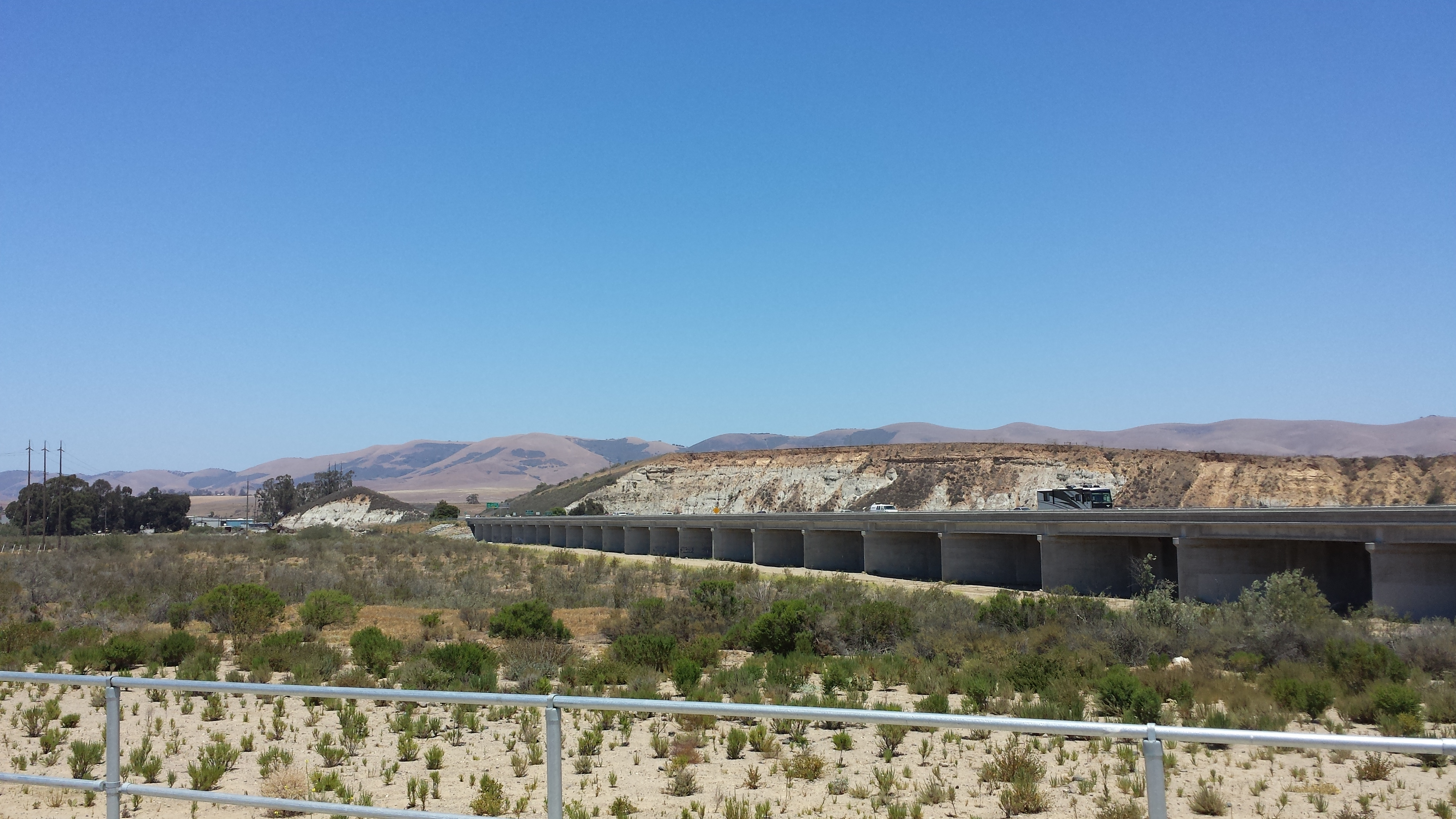
- Santa Maria River as seen from a bike trail on the Santa Barbara County side, with the 101 Freeway bridge visible

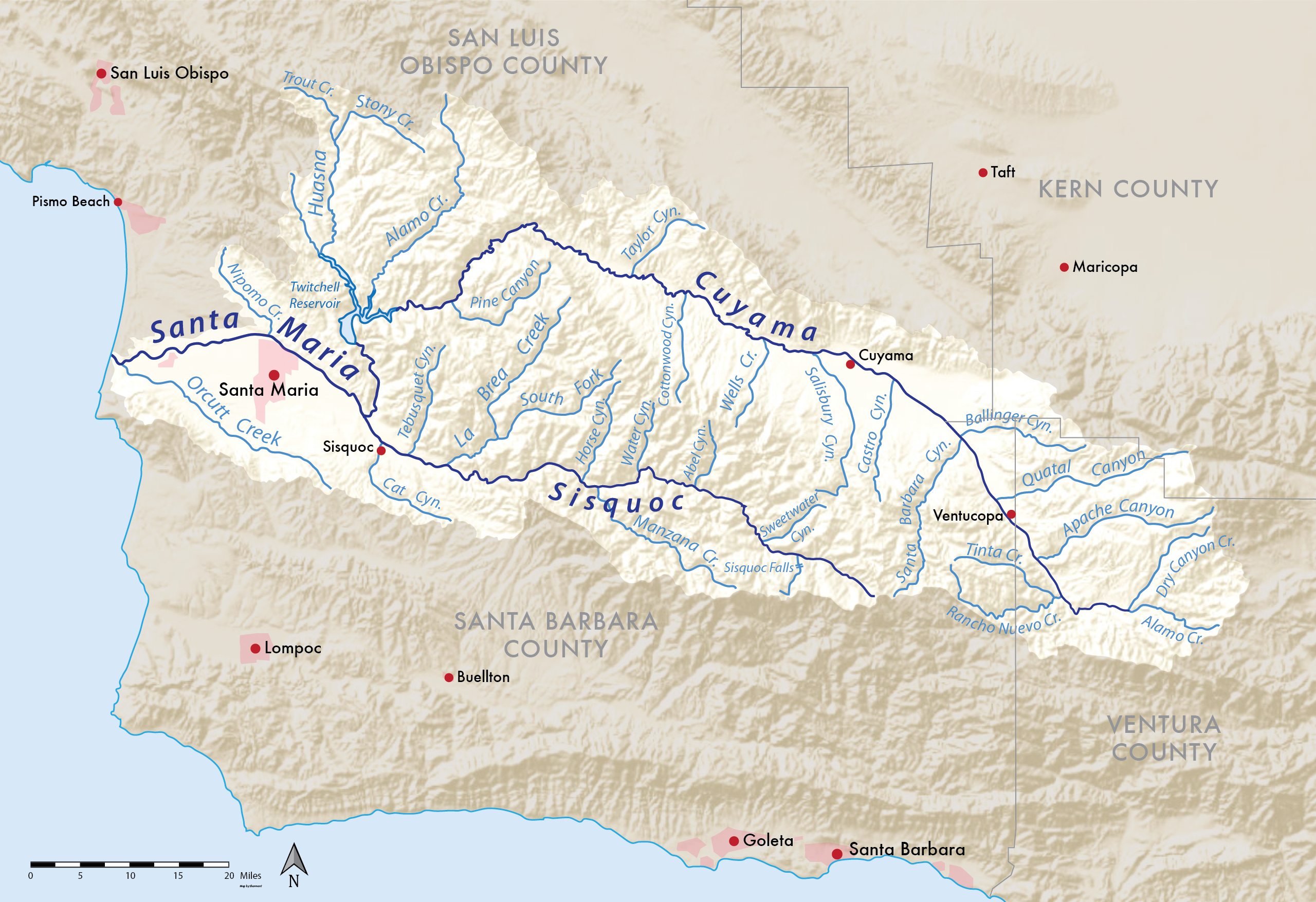
- Map of the Santa Maria River watershed

Location
- Country: United States
- State: California
- Cities: Santa Maria, Guadalupe

Physical characteristics
- Source: Confluence of Sisquoc River and Cuyama River
  - location: South of Twitchell Reservoir
  - coordinates: 34°54′11″N 120°18′45″W
  - elevation: 354 ft (108 m)
- Mouth: Pacific Ocean
  - location: Guadalupe Dunes County Park
  - coordinates: 34°58′15″N 120°39′01″W
  - elevation: 0 ft (0 m)
- Length: 24.4 mi (39.3 km)
- Basin size: 1,760 sq mi (4,600 km^{2})
- Discharge
  - location: Guadalupe
  - average: 30.2 cu ft/s (0.86 m^{3}/s)
  - minimum: 0 cu ft/s (0 m^{3}/s)
  - maximum: 32,800 cu ft/s (930 m^{3}/s)

Santa Maria River on the Central Coast of California, is formed at the confluence of the Sisquoc River and Cuyama River, just east of the city of Santa Maria, and flows 24.4 miles (39.3 km) to its delta at the Pacific Ocean.

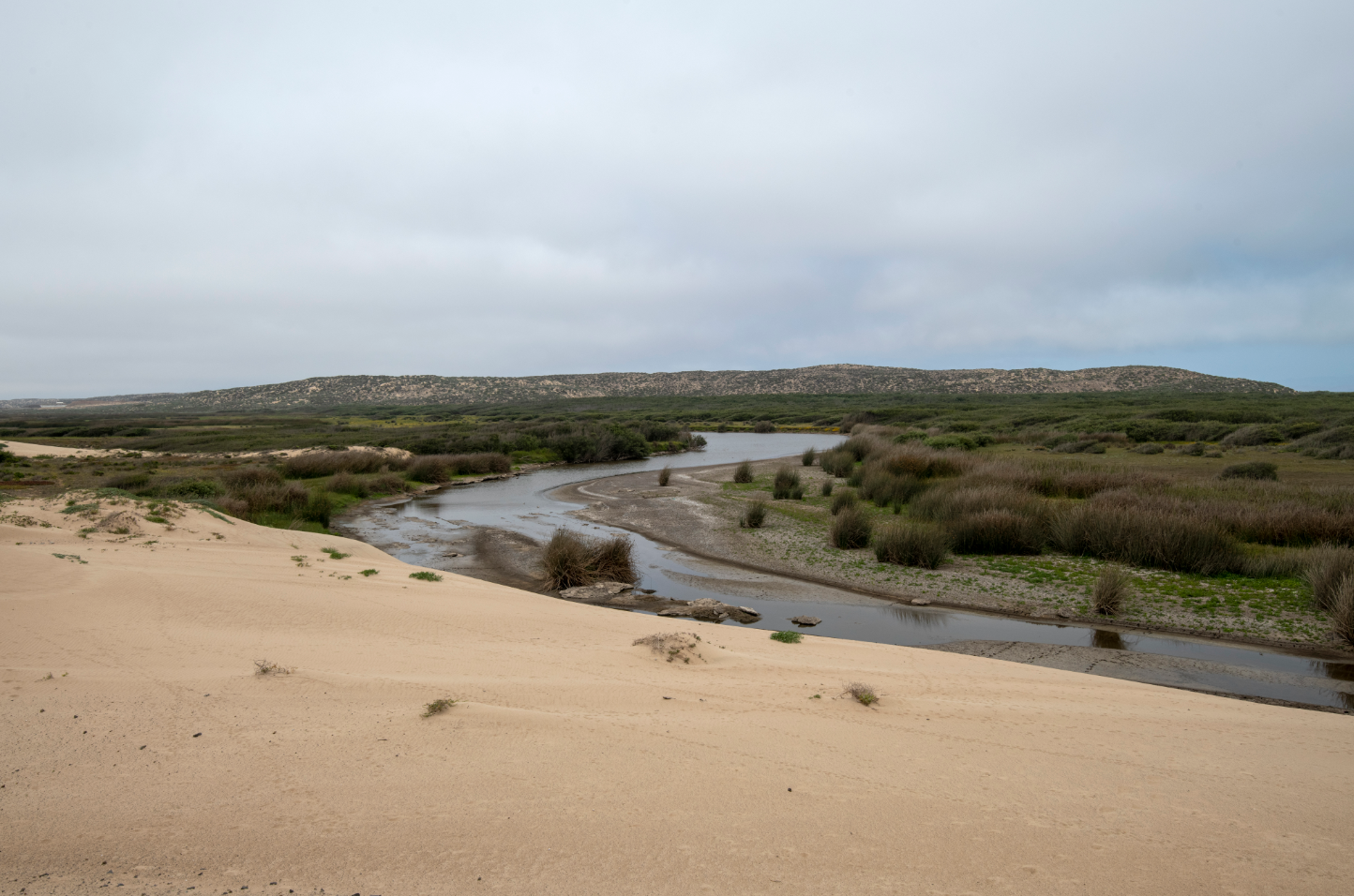
Once a place where the Chumash people gathered seafood, the Santa Maria River estuary in the Rancho Guadalupe Dunes Preserve has become a seabird-watching site.

The entire river defines the border between northern Santa Barbara County and southern San Luis Obispo County, up to the Sisquoc River, with a major bridge on Highway 101 passing over it. The Santa Maria River Fault is a tectonic fault that roughly corresponds with the course of the river.

There are no dams or lakes on the Santa Maria River itself, although Twitchell Reservoir is formed by a dam on the tributary Cuyama River. Twitchell Dam was built by the United States Bureau of Reclamation and provides flood control and groundwater recharge of the aquifer. The Sisquoc River is also free-flowing, and a National Wild and Scenic Rivers System.

During much of the year, the Santa Maria River has very little water, but it can swell greatly during winter storms. The section adjacent to the city of Santa Maria has experienced encampments of unhoused people.

== See also ==
- List of rivers of California
