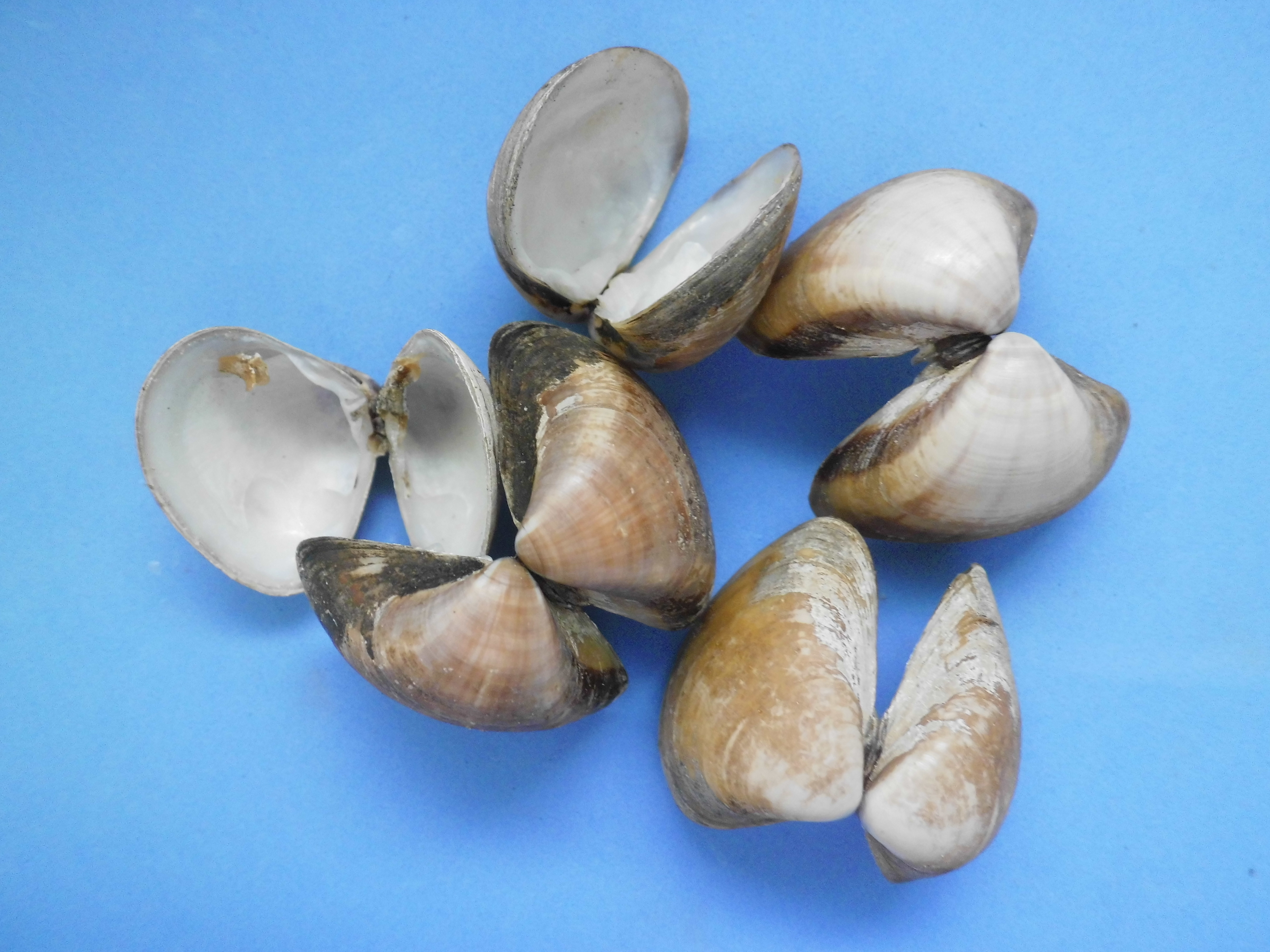

Scientific classification
- Kingdom: Animalia
- Phylum: Mollusca
- Class: Bivalvia
- Order: Venerida
- Family: Veneridae
- Genus: Tivela
- Species: T. mactroides

Binomial name
- Tivela mactroides (Born, 1778)

= Tivela mactroides =

Species of bivalve

Tivela mactroides is a species of bivalve belonging to the family Veneridae.

The species is found in the Americas.

Right and left valve of the same specimen:

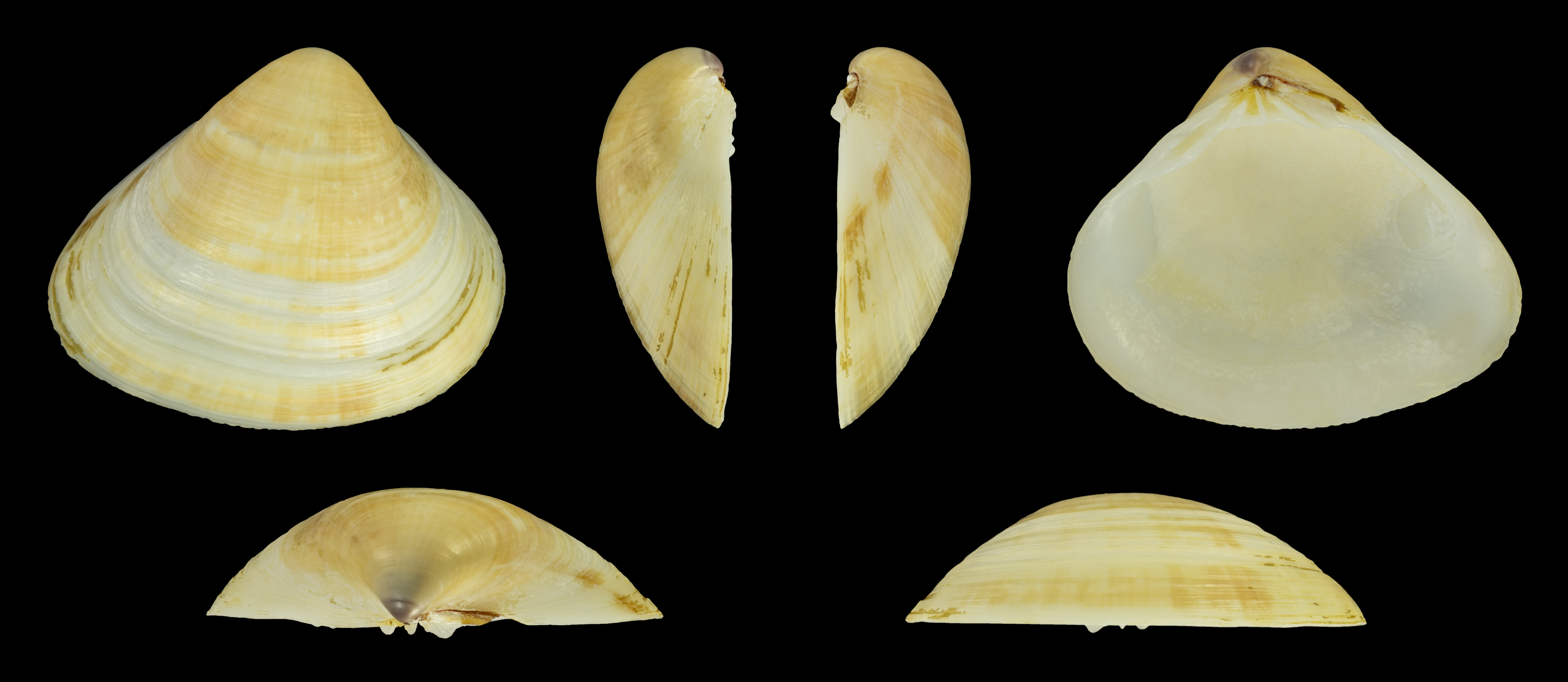
Right valve

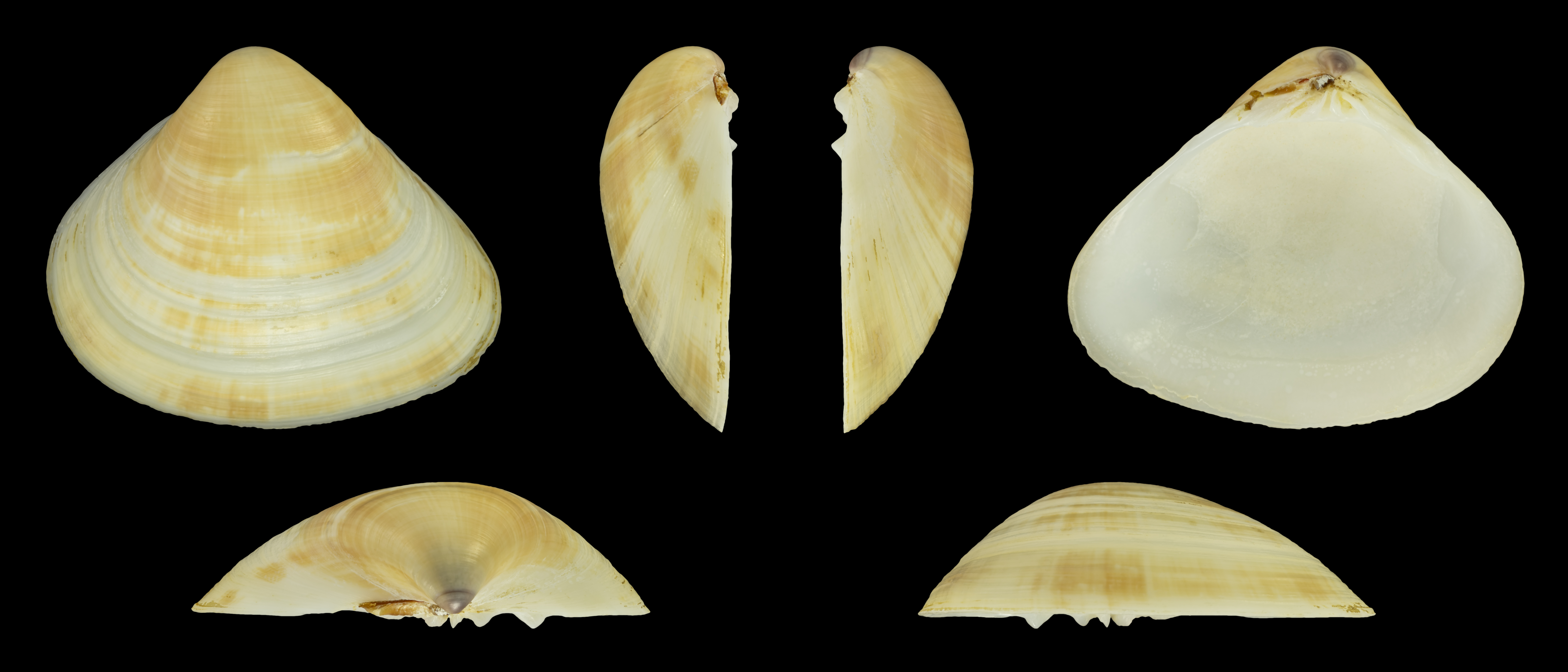
Left valve
