= Camp Scheideck, California =

Unincorporated community in California, United States

- Unincorporated community
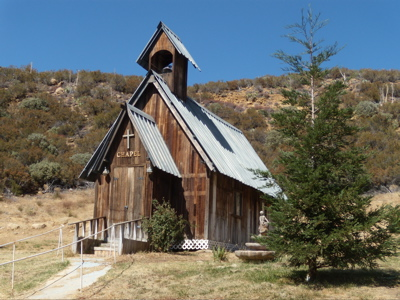
- The chapel at Camp Scheideck

- Location within the state of California Camp Scheideck, California (the United States)
- Coordinates: 34°40′53″N 119°18′33″W
- Country: United States
- State: California
- County: Ventura
- Elevation: 3,894 ft (1,187 m)
- Time zone: UTC-8 (Pacific (PST))
  - Summer (DST): UTC-7 (PDT)
- GNIS feature ID: 273601

Camp Scheideck is an unincorporated community in Ventura County in Southern California, United States, within the Cuyama Valley, approximately 37 miles (60 km) due north of Ojai and 30 miles (48 km) from Frazier Park in Kern County.

== Geography ==
Camp Scheideck is situated on Reyes Creek within the Los Padres National Forest, 1.5 miles (2.4 km) from Lockwood Valley Road leading from Frazier Park / Lake of the Woods to California State Route 33, just north of Ozena Fire Station 72. It is 3,780 feet (1,150 m) above sea level.

== Climate ==
The climate of Camp Scheideck is Mediterranean, characterized by hot, dry summers, at times exceeding 100 °F or 37.8 °C, and mild, rainy winters, with lows at night falling below freezing at times. The area has some of the highest diurnal temperature variations, with average yearly highs being equal to or sometimes higher than those of the nearby Central Valley, but with lows that are commonly several degrees colder, with frosts seen as early as September to May.

Flash floods and heavy snowfall can happen, trapping residents inside the river crossings for a few days.

Climate data for Camp Scheideck, California (normals)
Month	Jan	Feb	Mar	Apr	May	Jun	Jul	Aug	Sep	Oct	Nov	Dec	Year
Mean daily maximum °F (°C)	61.0 (16.1)	61.0 (16.1)	67.0 (19.4)	72.0 (22.2)	80.0 (26.7)	91.0 (32.8)	97.0 (36.1)	95.0 (35.0)	90.0 (32.2)	79.0 (26.1)	67.0 (19.4)	59.0 (15.0)	76.6 (24.8)
Daily mean °F (°C)	46.5 (8.1)	46.5 (8.1)	50.0 (10.0)	54.5 (12.5)	61.0 (16.1)	70.0 (21.1)	76.5 (24.7)	74.0 (23.3)	69.0 (20.6)	60.0 (15.6)	51.0 (10.6)	45.0 (7.2)	58.7 (14.8)
Mean daily minimum °F (°C)	32.0 (0.0)	31.0 (−0.6)	33.0 (0.6)	37.0 (2.8)	42.0 (5.6)	49.0 (9.4)	56.0 (13.3)	53.0 (11.7)	48.0 (8.9)	41.0 (5.0)	35.0 (1.7)	31.0 (−0.6)	40.7 (4.8)

== History ==
=== Founding and growth ===
According to Bonnie Ketterl Kane of the Ridge Route Communities Museum and Historical Society, the community was founded in 1888 by Martin Scheideck of Germany, who traveled with a friend, Gebhardt Wegis, "to avoid mandatory enlistment in the army."

[T]he two adventurers . . . walked from San Luis Obispo to Upper Cuyama[,] where they felt they found an area that reminded them of southern Germany. Both claimed homesteads near the Reyes family[,] who had been grazing cattle in the mountain valleys since the 1850s. Gebhardt married one of the Reyes daughters, Rosa, establishing the Wegis name in that area.

According to Kane, Scheideck built an adobe house and store with a wine cellar "and was known to serve hard cider to postal customers and candy in a bucket for the children. He was said to have been called "Judge Scheideck" after an "itinerant lawyer" left him a set of lawbooks, which he studied and "put to use in settling disputes."

Reporter Charles Hillinger of the Los Angeles Times, however, reported that the settlement was founded in 1888 by Eugene Scheideck, a German immigrant, on 160 acres (0.65 km^{2}). A two-story wooden building was erected around 1900 to establish the Ozena station of the U.S. Post Office. As time passed, Sheideck built a lodge and tiny cabins along the Ozena Creek. By 1975 there were 54 of the little houses, which were owned individually but were built on both sides of Reyes Creek on 11 acres (45,000 m^{2}) of land leased from the property owners.

In 1975 there were only two couples living year around in the settlement, one of which was Barbara and Harold Brake, who owned the gas station, bar, store and dance hall. By 1992 the permanent population had grown to nine residents, Bugs and Frances Lackey, Uncle Vane Fort. J.R. and Rose Putzier, Betsy Paine. John (The Painter) Hilton, Frances Hawkins. and Stephanie Rogers, according to a Los Angeles Times reporter, who called the settlement "a self-contained mountain colony" with no telephone service and only two mobile phones for communication outside the Ozena Valley.

=== Ownership ===
The property was owned by the Scheideck family for nine decades. Eugene Scheideck's nephew, also named Eugene, was 81 years old when he had it in 1975. In 1978, however, Jim Cory, an Oxnard auto dealer, and four others bought the land from Jim Scheideck of Taft, and in 1990 it was sold to Ozzie Osborn, a rancher and plumbing contractor.

In August 2011 the 120-year-old lodge was owned by Tony Virgilio.

== Reputation ==
Published accounts of Camp Scheideck have stressed its unusual nature. The Ridge Route Communities Museum and Historical Society, for example, noted that "Judge" Scheideck ran egg hunts on both Easter Sunday and Halloween, which was Scheideck's birthday, and the custom was still being observed in 2013.

In July 1979 a golf tournament was held on a course "scratched into" the surface of the landscape, dodging "bushes, gullies and rattlesnake holes." Instead of greens, the course had "browns." Golf clubs were made from tree limbs or plastic pipe, or a croquet mallet. Tennis balls were used instead of golf balls; three-gallon containers replaced standard golf cups. Proceeds were turned over to a 4-H Club.

The place is so remote: 37 miles (60 km) due north of Ojai, up the tortuous California 33 beyond Matilija Canyon's cutoff and over much of the 6,500-foot (2,000 m) Pine Mountain before descending to 4,000 feet (1,200 m). Then two right turns take the car onto dirt and, in two crossings, through the winding Cuyama River before climbing again, this time over a mesa into a mile-long gash in the Earth called Ozena Valley. A long way for a beer.

But people [found] it. Some, from seeing a small, ridiculous sign on the paved Lockwood Valley Road: "Scheideck's Lodge. Cocktails and dining. Turn here, go in 1.5 miles." But most simply hear about it from the people who call Scheideck's home, the people who live here in cabins only steps from the [former] tavern. . . .

Scheideck's Lodge, while a curiosity to the day-tripper and oasis for hikers at nearby Reyes Creek Campground, performed many functions beyond pulling tap beer and keeping a jukebox current with Hank Williams Jr. and Bonnie Raitt. The bar is a window into a self-contained mountain colony, a tavern-as-nexus where information was long-traded in a phoneless society.

== Amenities ==
There are myriad old cabins, several mobile home units, a picturesque, slightly undersized ghost town, and, just above the ghost town, a mock cemetery called "Boot Hill," adjacent to an old wooden chapel where weddings have been performed. Back in the days of the Lodge, Scheideck / Ozena was a destination or a stopover for motorcycle riders.

Residents have reported that the Osborn family intends to repurpose the Lodge building as a "mercantile store" serving residents and campers, possibly doubling as an art gallery for local artists.

Reyes Creek runs year-round, although in times of drought it reportedly slows to a trickle.
