= Oceano =

Oceano or Océano, meaning ocean in several Romance languages, may refer to:

== Places ==
- Oceano, California

== Music ==
- Oceano (band), US deathcore band
- Oceano, 1971 film score by Ennio Morricone, see List of compositions by Ennio Morricone
- Océano, 1989 album by Pablo Ruiz (singer)
- Oceano, 1996 album by Sérgio Mendes
- Oceano, 2003 album by Annalisa Panetta
- Oceano, 2004 album by Danna Paola
- "Oceano", song on the 2003 album Closer (Josh Groban album)

== People ==
- Oceano da Cruz, Cape Verde-born Portuguese footballer
