= Pismo Beach, California =

City in California, United States

- City
- City of Pismo Beach
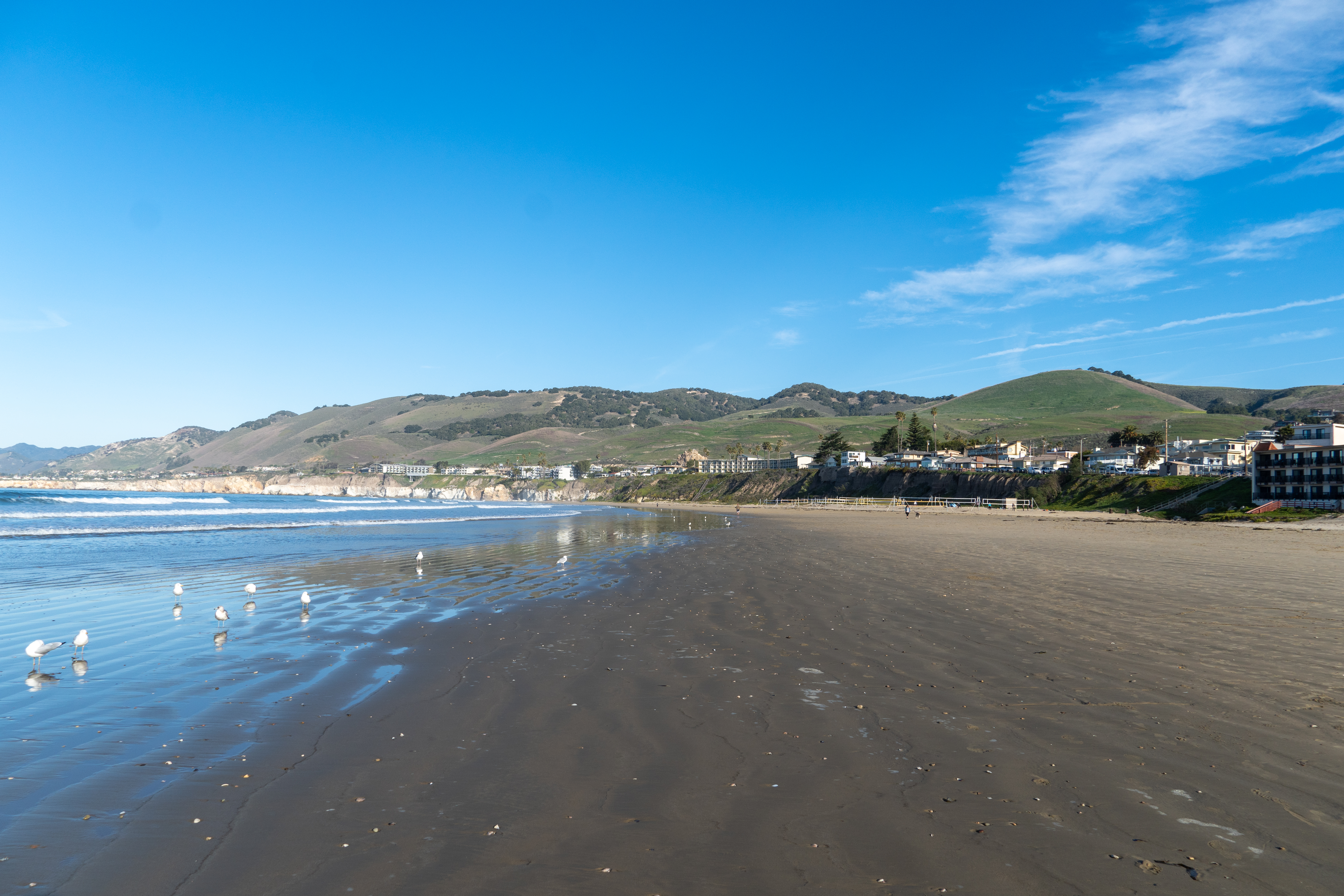
- Pismo Beach

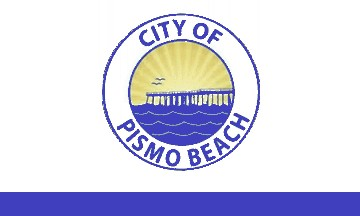
- Flag Seal
- Interactive map of Pismo Beach, California
- Location in the United States
- Coordinates: 35°8′54″N 120°38′53″W
- Country: United States
- State: California
- County: San Luis Obispo
- Incorporated: April 25, 1946
- Named for: Tar

Government
  - Type: Council–manager
  - Body: Pismo Beach City Council
  - Mayor: Ed Waage
  - City manager: Jorge E. Garcia
  - Council Members: List: • Mayor Pro Tempore: Mary Ann Reiss; • Marcia Guthrie; • Stacy Inman; • Scott Newton
  - Assemblymember: Dawn Addis (D)
  - State Senator: John Laird (D)

Area
  - Total: 13.37 sq mi (34.64 km^{2})
  - Land: 3.50 sq mi (9.06 km^{2})
  - Water: 9.88 sq mi (25.58 km^{2})
- Elevation: 56 ft (17 m)

Population (2020)
  - Total: 8,072
  - Estimate (2025): 7,911
  - Density: 2,310/sq mi (891/km^{2})
- Time zone: UTC−8 (Pacific)
  - Summer (DST): UTC−7 (PDT)
- ZIP Codes: 93448, 93449
- Area code: 805
- FIPS code: 06-57414
- GNIS feature IDs: 1652776, 2411429
- Website: pismobeach.org

Pismo Beach (Chumash: Pismuʔ) is a city in the southern portion of San Luis Obispo County, in the Central Coast area of California, United States. Its population was 8,072 at the 2020 census, up from 7,655 in 2010.

The city was reincorporated in 1946. Its waterfront includes a pier built in 1924 and renovated in 2018. Nearby Pismo State Beach includes a wintering site for monarch butterflies.

== History ==
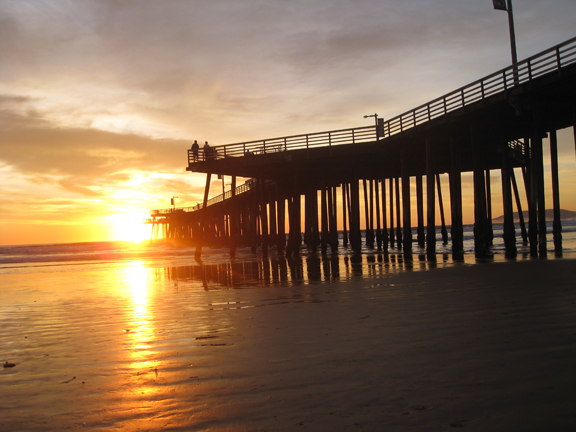
Pismo Pier at sunset

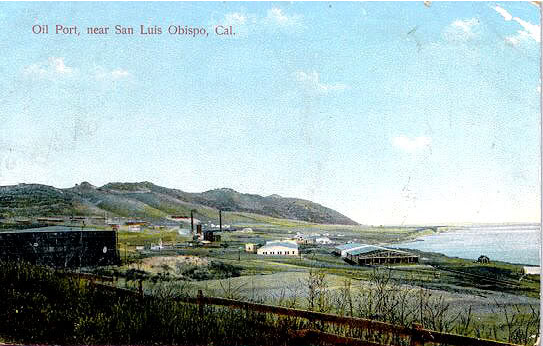
The old Oilport Refinery, demolished after WWII, is now the Sunset Palisades neighborhood.

The Chumash people are the historic inhabitants of the region, with indigenous peoples having lived along the California coast for at least 11,000 years. The name Pismo comes from the Chumash language word for tar, pismuʔ, which was gathered from tar springs in Price Canyon near Pismo Beach. Tar was a valuable product, which the Chumash used to caulk their canoes, called tomol, which traveled along the coast and out to the Channel Islands. The first European land exploration of Alta California, the Spanish Portolá expedition, passed through the area, traveling up Price Canyon from Pismo Beach, where they camped on September 4, 1769. Franciscan missionary and expedition member Juan Crespí noted in his diary that they found a Chumash village near the creek.

Pismo Beach is on the Rancho Pismo Mexican land grant made to José Ortega, grandson of José Francisco Ortega, in 1840. In 1846, José Ortega sold Rancho Pismo to Isaac Sparks. John Michael Price bought most of the rancho from Sparks. Price established the town of Pismo Beach in 1891. His homestead is now Price Historical Park, a registered historical landmark.

Pismo Pier was built in 1924. Storm damage led to subsequent repairs and reconstruction. The pier reopened on October 20, 2018, after more than 18 months of renovations.

The Shell Beach and Sunset Palisades neighborhoods were the site of a Chumash village, and there are significant archeological sites in both. Shell Beach became agricultural land, mostly pea fields. Developer Floyd Calvert bought and developed the area in 1926. At first, it was a local resort area; after World War II, it became primarily residential. Sunset Palisades, originally called Oilport, was the site of an oil refinery from 1907 until after World War II; it is now residential.

Pismo Beach first incorporated on January 11, 1939. Residents voted to disincorporate in February 1940, and the city reincorporated on April 25, 1946.

=== Clams ===
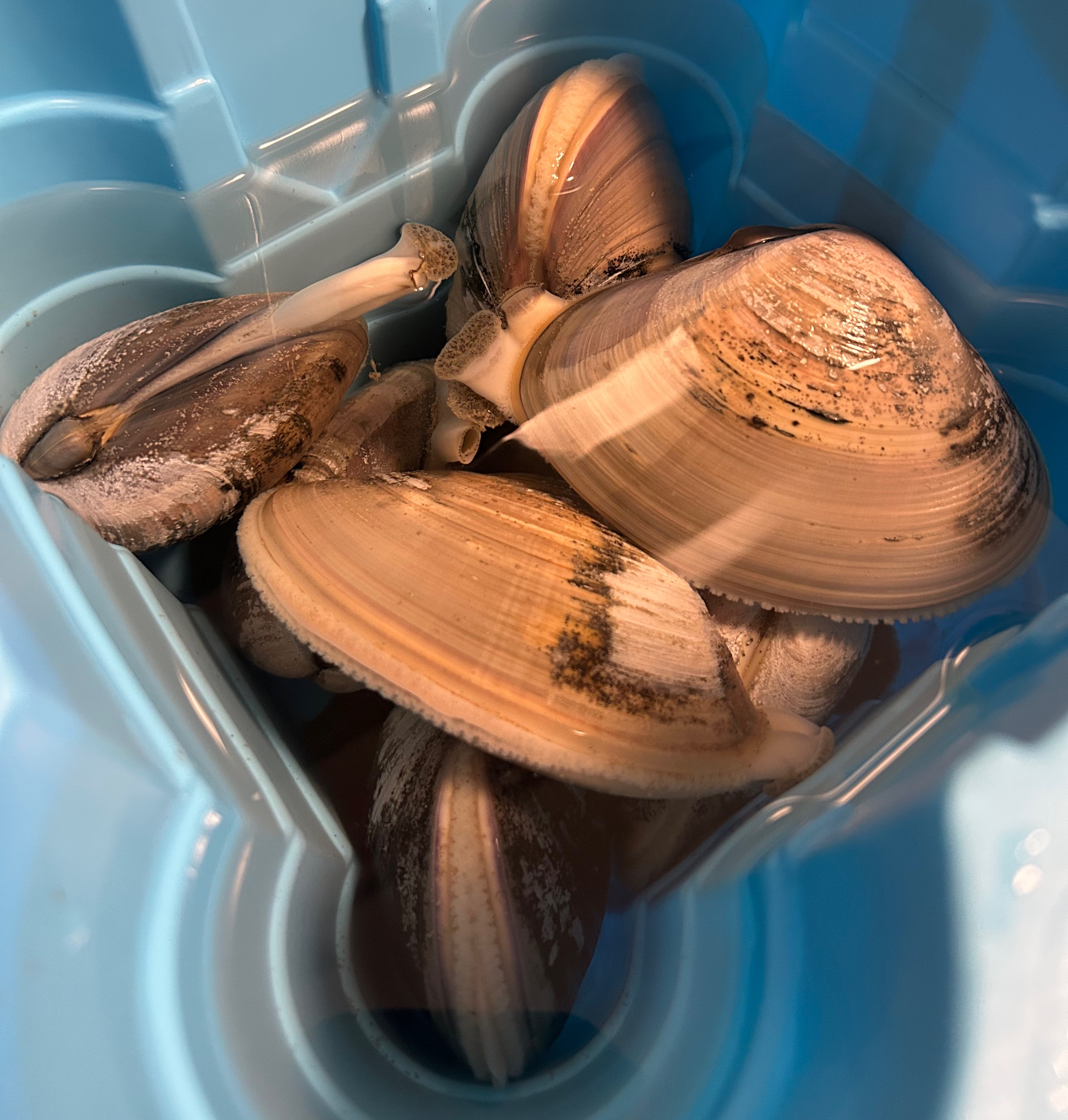
Pismo clams harvested at Pismo Beach

The city was known as the "Clam Capital of the World" in the 1950s. Commercial harvesting of Pismo clams ended in 1947. The California Department of Fish and Wildlife reports that clam numbers have increased in recent years and that harvestable-sized clams have returned to the Pismo Beach area, although smaller clams remain more numerous.

The city holds a Clam Festival each October, with a parade and a clam chowder competition.

== Geography ==
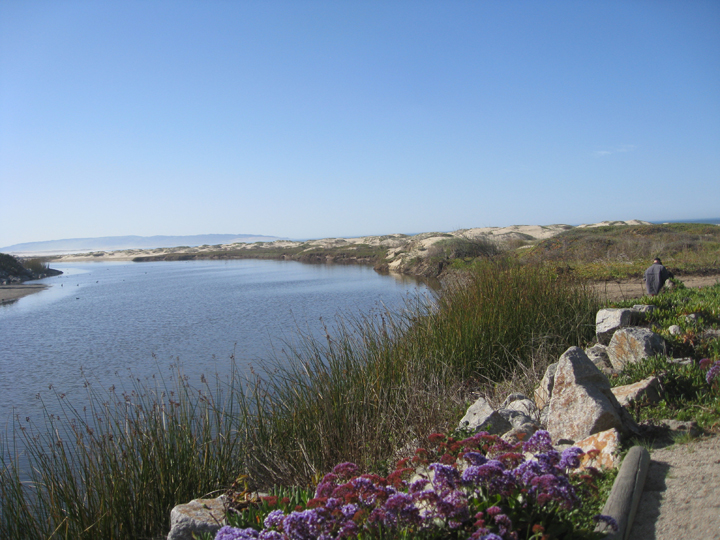
Pismo Creek estuary

External videos
- Panoramic Video of Pismo Beach on YouTube

The Census Bureau's 2019 gazetteer lists 3.497 square miles (9.06 km^{2}) of land and 9.877 square miles (25.58 km^{2}) of water within the city. It is part of the Five Cities area, a cluster of cities in that area. The Five Cities area historically comprised Arroyo Grande, Grover City (now Grover Beach), Halcyon, Fair Oaks, and Nipomo. Now the Five Cities are generally considered to be Grover Beach, Pismo Beach, Shell Beach (which is actually part of Pismo Beach), Arroyo Grande, and Oceano (which is unincorporated county land serviced by the Oceano Community Services District).

Pismo Creek enters the Pacific Ocean at Pismo Beach. The Monarch Butterfly Grove at Pismo State Beach provides an overwintering site for western monarch butterflies from November through February.

Meadow Creek is a short waterway that runs through the Pismo Lake Ecological Reserve and hosts a variety of wildlife despite its urban surroundings, including beaver (Castor canadensis).

=== Climate ===
Pismo Beach has dry summers and wetter winters. The 1991–2020 mean temperature was 54.5 °F (12.5 °C) in January and 63.1 °F (17.3 °C) in August.

Climate data for Pismo Beach (1991–2020 normals)
Month	Jan	Feb	Mar	Apr	May	Jun	Jul	Aug	Sep	Oct	Nov	Dec	Year
Mean daily maximum °F (°C)	64.8 (18.2)	65.1 (18.4)	67.5 (19.7)	69.7 (20.9)	72.3 (22.4)	70.5 (21.4)	70.3 (21.3)	71.4 (21.9)	71.9 (22.2)	72.5 (22.5)	69.0 (20.6)	65.0 (18.3)	69.2 (20.7)
Daily mean °F (°C)	54.5 (12.5)	54.5 (12.5)	56.9 (13.8)	59.0 (15.0)	60.9 (16.1)	61.0 (16.1)	62.1 (16.7)	63.1 (17.3)	62.7 (17.1)	62.5 (16.9)	57.7 (14.3)	54.3 (12.4)	59.1 (15.1)
Mean daily minimum °F (°C)	44.2 (6.8)	44.0 (6.7)	46.2 (7.9)	48.2 (9.0)	49.5 (9.7)	51.4 (10.8)	53.9 (12.2)	54.8 (12.7)	53.6 (12.0)	52.6 (11.4)	46.4 (8.0)	43.7 (6.5)	49.0 (9.5)
Average precipitation inches (mm)	3.48 (88)	4.00 (102)	2.98 (76)	1.00 (25)	0.46 (12)	0.15 (3.8)	0.02 (0.51)	0.02 (0.51)	0.08 (2.0)	0.79 (20)	1.81 (46)	3.08 (78)	17.87 (453.82)
Average precipitation days (≥ 0.01 in)	9.6	10.4	8.3	4.8	2.1	1.5	0.4	0.6	1.8	3.9	5.4	8.1	56.9
Source: NOAA

== Demographics ==
Historical population
Census	Pop.	Note	%±
1950	1,425		—
1960	1,762		23.6%
1970	4,043		129.5%
1980	5,364		32.7%
1990	7,669		43.0%
2000	8,551		11.5%
2010	7,655		−10.5%
2020	8,072		5.4%
2025 (est.)	7,911		−2.0%
U.S. Decennial Census

=== 2010 census ===
The 2010 census counted 7,655 residents, with a population density of 2,126.9 inhabitants per square mile (821.2/km^{2}).

=== 2020 census ===
As of the 2020 census, Pismo Beach had a population of 8,072. The population density was 2,308.3 inhabitants per square mile (891.2/km^{2}).

The census reported that 99.7% of the population lived in households, 0.3% lived in non-institutionalized group quarters, and no one was institutionalized. Of residents, 99.0% lived in urban areas and 1.0% lived in rural areas.

There were 4,057 households, of which 15.9% had children under age 18. Of all households, 45.5% were married-couple households, 6.5% were cohabiting-couple households, 19.8% had a male householder with no spouse or partner present, and 28.2% had a female householder with no spouse or partner present. About 35.2% of households were one-person households, and 18.1% had someone living alone who was 65 or older. The average household size was 1.98, and there were 2,278 families (56.1% of all households).

The age distribution was 12.6% under 18, 4.7% from 18 to 24, 20.6% from 25 to 44, 29.4% from 45 to 64, and 32.8% age 65 or older. The median age was 55.7 years. For every 100 females, there were 92.3 males, and for every 100 females age 18 and over there were 90.6 males.

There were 5,816 housing units at an average density of 1,663.1 units per square mile (642.1 units/km^{2}). Of housing units, 69.8% were occupied and 30.2% were vacant. Of occupied units, 62.3% were owner-occupied and 37.7% were renter-occupied. The homeowner vacancy rate was 2.0% and the rental vacancy rate was 7.3%.

Racial composition as of the 2020 census
Race	Number	Percent
White	6,542	81.0%
Black or African American	68	0.8%
American Indian and Alaska Native	79	1.0%
Asian	324	4.0%
Native Hawaiian and Other Pacific Islander	10	0.1%
Some other race	293	3.6%
Two or more races	756	9.4%
Hispanic or Latino (of any race)	978	12.1%

=== Recent estimates ===
The Census Bureau estimated the population at 7,911 on July 1, 2025. Its 2020–2024 estimates put median household income at $118,072 and per capita income at $78,198, both in 2024 dollars. Among residents aged 25 and older, 97.6% had completed high school or higher education, and 51.7% held at least a bachelor's degree. An estimated 5.7% of residents were foreign-born.

== Economy ==
=== Top employers ===
The city's annual financial report lists the following principal employers for the fiscal year ended June 30, 2025:

Rank	Employer	Employees
1	Martin Resorts	147
2	The Cliffs on Shell Beach	139
3	Keller Williams	119
4	City of Pismo Beach	111
5	Dolphin Bay Resort	109
6	California Fresh Market	99
7	Custom House Restaurant	98
8	U.S. Postal Service	89
9	Pacifica Hotels	70
10	Sea Venture	69

== Government ==
Pismo Beach is a general-law city governed by a five-member council. The city council consists of a mayor (who serves a two-year term) and four councilmembers (who serve four-year terms). All five are elected at-large.

In the California State Legislature, Pismo Beach is in the 17th senatorial district, represented by Democrat John Laird, and the 30th Assembly district, represented by Democrat Dawn Addis.

In the United States House of Representatives, Pismo Beach is in California's 24th congressional district, represented by Democrat Salud Carbajal.

== Education ==
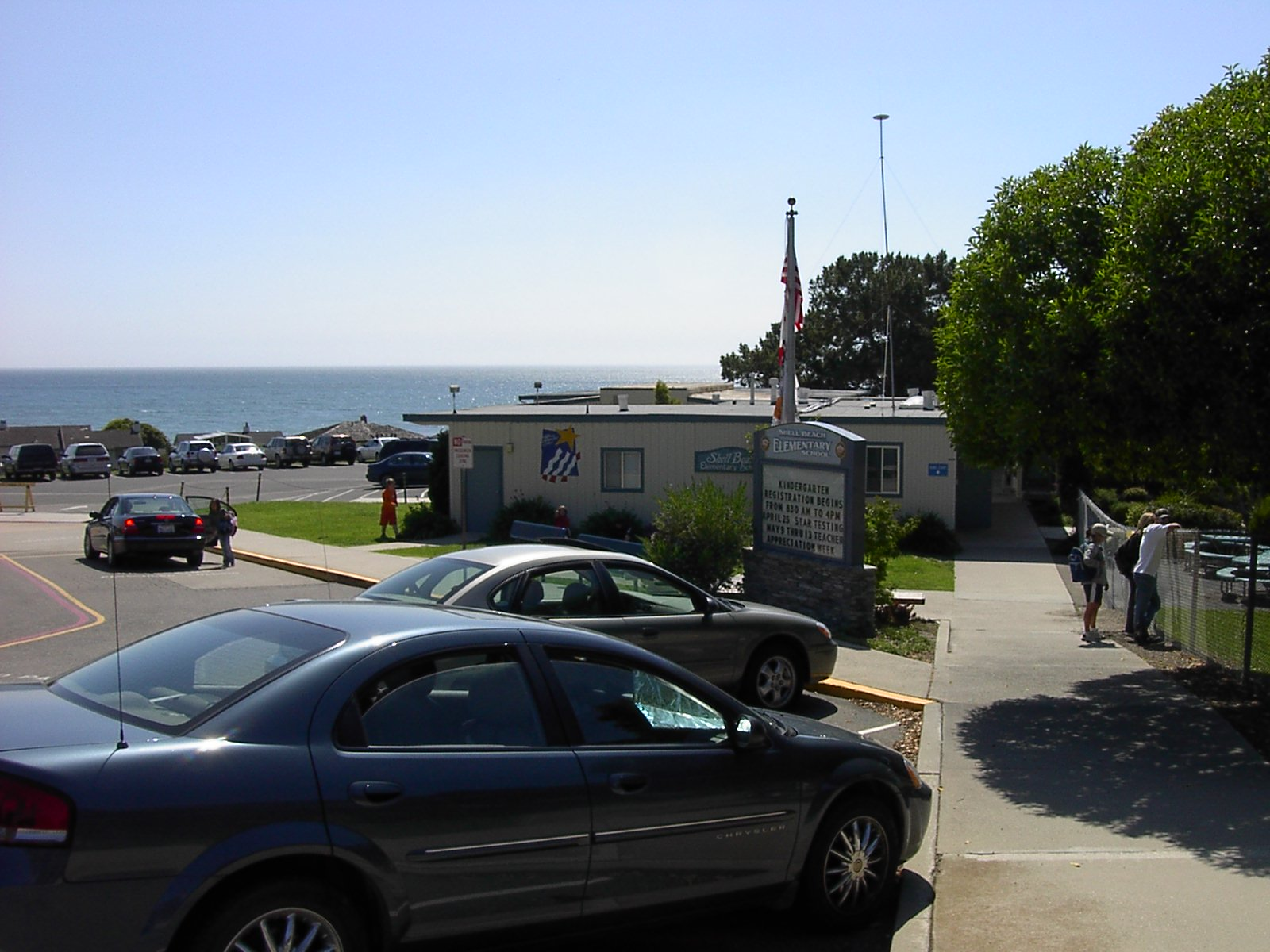
Shell Beach Elementary School

Most of Pismo Beach is served by the Lucia Mar Unified School District, while a portion is served by the San Luis Coastal Unified School District.

Lucia Mar schools include:

- Shell Beach Elementary School
- Judkins Middle School

== Infrastructure ==
Water is provided by wells in the Santa Maria Groundwater Basin, Lopez Lake, and the State Water Project. The planned Central Coast Blue recycled water project would purify wastewater for injection into the Santa Maria Groundwater Basin. It is intended to supplement water supplies and limit seawater intrusion.

== In popular culture ==
Pismo Beach is referenced in the animated short Ali Baba Bunny (1957), in which Bugs Bunny mistakes his destination for the beach. Clueless (1995) features a fictional "Pismo Beach disaster". The city is also mentioned in The Big Lebowski and A Night at the Roxbury, both released in 1998.
