= Rancho Pismo =

Land grant in California

Coordinates: 35.150°N 120.620°W

Rancho Pismo was a 8,839-acre (35.77 km^{2}) Mexican land grant in present day San Luis Obispo County, California, given in 1840 by acting governor Manuel Jimeno Casarin to José Ortega (probably a descendant or other relative of José Francisco Ortega). The grant extended along the Pacific coast and encompassed present day Pismo Beach, Grover Beach, Shell Beach and parts of Arroyo Grande.

== History ==
José Ortega was granted the two square league rancho in 1840. José Ortega sold Rancho Pismo to Isaac Sparks in 1846.

Isaac Sparks (1804–1867) was born in Maine. He arrived in Los Angeles in 1832, and by 1848, had established a large otter trapping and merchant business in Santa Barbara. In 1836, he married Maria De Los Remedios Josefa Eayrs (1813-1893), daughter of a sea captain George Washington Eayrs (1775–1855). In 1843, Sparks was the grantee of Rancho Huasna.

With the cession of California to the United States following the Mexican-American War, the 1848 Treaty of Guadalupe Hidalgo provided that the land grants would be honored. As required by the Land Act of 1851, a claim for Rancho Pismo was filed with the Public Land Commission in 1852, and the grant was patented to Isaac J. Sparks in 1866.

In 1850, Sparks resold Rancho Pismo. He sold the southern half (now Grover Beach and Arroyo Grande) to Francis Ziba Branch. He sold the northern half (now Shell Beach and Pismo Beach) to John Price and David P. Mallagh. The Englishman John Price operated Rancho Huasna for Sparks, and it seems that Spark gave him part of Rancho Pismo instead of paying him wages. John Michael Price (1810–1902) came to California in 1830, and worked on Monterey area ranchos then went to work on Rancho Huasna. Price lived and worked on his Rancho Pismo land until his death in 1902.

Irish sea captain David P.Mallagh, came to California in 1849, and soon afterward married Juana de Jesús Carrillo (1829–) of Rancho Cabeza de Santa Rosa. In 1860 he built a small wharf on the adjacent Rancho San Miguelito, which is now called Mallagh’s Landing.

== See also ==
- Ranchos of California
- List of Ranchos of California
