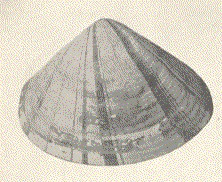

Scientific classification
- Kingdom: Animalia
- Phylum: Mollusca
- Class: Bivalvia
- Order: Venerida
- Superfamily: Veneroidea
- Family: Veneridae
- Genus: Tivela
- Species: T. stultorum

Binomial name
- Tivela stultorum (Mawe, 1823)

= Tivela stultorum =

Species of mollusc

Tivela stultorum, also known as the Pismo clam, is a species of large, edible, saltwater clam, a marine bivalve mollusk in the family Veneridae, the Venus clams. This species is native to the eastern Pacific Ocean. As the name implies, the Pismo clam lives in Pismo Beach, California. It has been found at least as far south as 300 miles (480 km) south of the US–Mexico border in Baja California on the Pacific Ocean side, where strong surf sometimes washes ashore live clams. The indigenous peoples of California used this species for food.

== Taxonomy ==
This species was originally described as Donax stultorum by John Mawe in his 1823 work, The Linnaean System of Conchology. Later, however, the species was reassigned to the genus Tivela, so the currently accepted binomial nomenclature is Tivela stultorum.

== Description ==
The clam has two thick shells that share a large, symmetric triangular structure. A prominent hinge ligament connects the two shells. Its coloration varies from pale tan to dark brown, and some specimens have chocolate brown rays that start from the umbo. Shells can measure up to about 7.25 in (18.4 cm) in length.

== Habitat and range ==
Pismo clams typically inhabit exposed, sandy shorelines and can also occur near the entrances of bays, sloughs, and estuaries. They generally remain within the top 6 inches (15 cm) of sand. Although usually found in intertidal zones (most notably around Pismo Beach, Morro Bay, and Monterey Bay), they have been found to extend into deeper waters of up to 80 feet (24 m). In Southern California waters, larger clams predominantly reside at depths exceeding 20 feet (6.1 m).

Geographically, the species is found along the coast starting from central California and extending south into Magdalena Bay, Baja California Sur. Reported range limits vary by source: Fitch (1952) identifies Half Moon Bay as the northern limit, whereas Coan et al. (2000) document occurrences as far north as Stinson Beach.

== Ecology ==
This species is a filter feeder. Pismo clams are consumed by numerous animals, including marine and terrestrial predators such as crabs, sharks, humans, and sea otters. In the past, local clam declines along the California coast were attributed in part to sea otters, but a statewide intertidal survey in 2018 and 2019 did not find otter presence to be a predictor of clam presence at a regional scale.

== Life cycle ==
The sexes are separate and occur in approximately equal numbers. Pismo clams can begin reproducing within their first year of life, well before reaching the legal harvest size. Individuals may live for several decades.

== Human use and conservation ==
Pismo clams have long served as a food resource for Indigenous coastal communities in California, including the Chumash, who have harvested this species along the California coast for thousands of years. Between 1916 and its closure in 1947, California’s commercial fishery harvested a total of roughly 6.25 million pounds of the species. The Pismo clam was also subject to a recreational fishery, which continued until well into the 1980s. Pismo clam populations experienced substantial declines after historically intensive harvesting. Researchers have tried to explain these declines through excessive harvesting and unsuccessful recruitment.

Currently, California Code of Regulations (14 CCR § 29.40) allows harvesters to take up to ten Pismo clams per day, as long as the shells of these clams meet the minimum size requirements. Minimum shell diameters vary by location: 5 inches (127 mm) north of the San Luis Obispo to Monterey county boundary and 4.5 inches (114 mm) south of it. The harvesting season runs from September 1 to April 30 in Santa Cruz and Monterey counties, but remains open year-round elsewhere, except in protected areas where clam harvesting is prohibited.

Statewide intertidal surveys conducted in 2018 and 2019 detected Pismo clams at 27 of 38 sampled beaches between Monterey Bay and the Mexican border. Clam populations averaged 2.18 individuals per square meter overall, but they varied by region. Sites north of Point Conception averaged 4.19 clams per square meter while sites to the south averaged 0.89 clams per square meter. Throughout all sites, no clams reached the harvest threshold set by the California Code of Regulations (114mm). 98% of clams measured less than or equal to 56 mm.

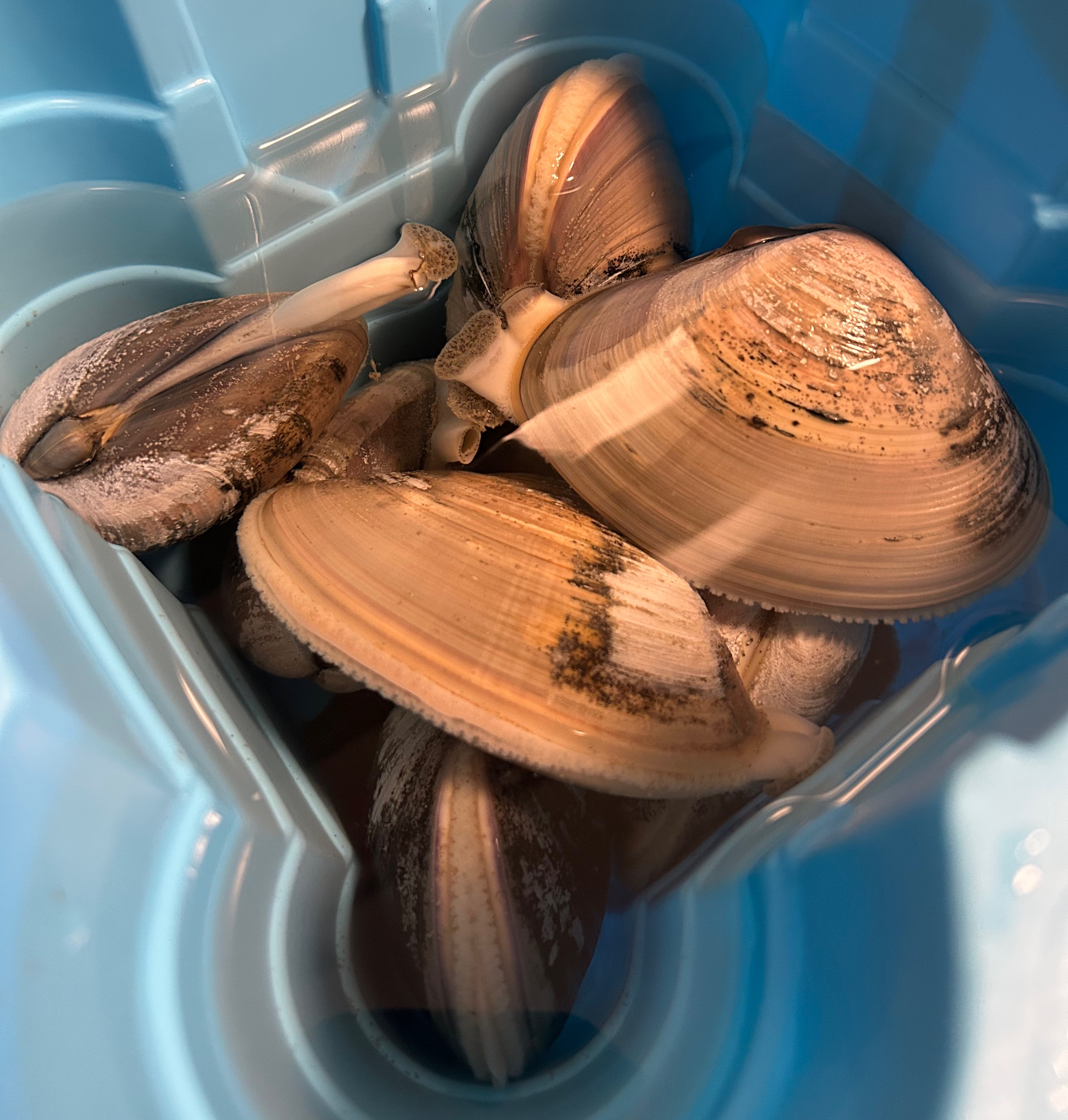
Pismo clams harvested from Pismo Beach, California in July 2026
