= Oak View, California =

Oak View
- Unincorporated community Census-designated place
- Location in Ventura County and the state of California
- Coordinates: 34°23′51″N 119°18′0″W
- Country: United States
- State: California
- County: Ventura

Government
  - State Senator: Monique Limón (D)
  - Assemblymember: Steve Bennett (D)
  - U. S. Rep.: Salud Carbajal (D)

Area
  - Total: 3.407 sq mi (8.823 km^{2})
  - Land: 3.407 sq mi (8.823 km^{2})
  - Water: 0 sq mi (0 km^{2}) 0%
- Elevation: 538 ft (164 m)

Population (2020)
  - Total: 6,215
  - Density: 1,824/sq mi (704.4/km^{2})
- Time zone: UTC-8 (PST)
  - Summer (DST): UTC-7 (PDT)
- ZIP code: 93022
- Area code: 805
- FIPS code: 06-53182
- GNIS feature ID: 1661131

Oak View is an unincorporated community in Ventura County, California, United States. The community is located along the Ventura River in a narrow valley between the towns of Casitas Springs (south) and Mira Monte (north). Lake Casitas and the community of Ojai are also nearby. At the 2020 census, the population of Oak View was 6,215, making it the third largest community between Ojai and the city of Ventura. For statistical purposes, the United States Census Bureau has defined Oak View as a census-designated place (CDP). The census definition of the area may not precisely correspond to local understanding of the area with the same name.

== Etymology ==
Oak View was given its name in 1925 due to the garden-like appearance of its many oak groves.

== History ==
Oak View is an unincorporated community in Ventura County, California that has grown into a bedroom community for Ojai and Ventura, post-WWII. The town initially began growing more in the late 1940s and early 1950s as a residential community for workers in the nearby oil industry and other local employment opportunities in Ventura County. That industry has since diminished.

== Geography ==
According to the United States Census Bureau, the CDP has a total area of 3.4 square miles (8.8 km^{2}), all land.

At the 2010 census, the CDP had a total area of 2.0 square miles (5.2 km^{2}), all land.

== Educational History ==
Although Oak View is located within the Ojai Valley, the town itself is located within the boundaries of the Ventura Unified School District. There is one school in Oak View, Arnaz Elementary (aka, Sunset Elementary), which is located on the south western portion of the town, at 400 Sunset.

In earlier years, two schools served the town. However, Oak View Elementary School, located between Prospect Street and Valley Road, and between Mahoney Avenue and Santa Ana Boulevard (Click here to see the Google map of the former Oak View Elementary), previously owned by the Ventura Unified School District (VUSD), was closed by the district.

The County considered selling the property to a housing developer who planned to build a high-density development (up to 33 houses) meant to serve low-income owners / renters. Instead, on August 2, 2002, the Oak View District was formed to purchase and rehabilitate the Oak View School for a community park and family resource center. A successful local ballot initiative was passed, which places a parcel tax assessment on a selected number of Oak View residential property owners, within a designated 'beneficial' distance from the school. The yearly tax has helped to pay down the long-term (30-year) purchase of the school from the VUSD by the county. You'll find an LA Times article on this purchase here: https://www.latimes.com/archives/la-xpm-2002-apr-26-me-library26-story.html.

The former school property was renamed, "The Oak View Park and Resource Center" (https://www.ovparc.org) and the District maintains the property and manages both non-profit and for-profit organizations that serve the community. The District continues to operate under the administrative oversight of Ventura County, with regular activities such as preparing Engineer's Reports and holding public hearings (https://bosagenda.countyofventura.org/sirepub/agdocs.aspx?doctype=agenda&itemid=92359).

== Libraries ==
Public Libraries: Ventura County Library - 14 locations with three branches in the Ojai Valley: Oak View Library, Ojai Library, and Meiners Oaks Library.

== Demographics ==
Historical population
Census	Pop.	Note	%±
1950	1,648		—
1960	2,448		48.5%
1970	4,872		99.0%
1980	4,671		−4.1%
1990	3,606		−22.8%
2000	4,199		16.4%
2010	4,066		−3.2%
2020	6,215		52.9%
U.S. Decennial Census; 1850–1870 1880-1890; 1900 1910 1920; 1930 1940 1950; 1960 1970 1980; 1990 2000 2010

Oak View first appeared as an unincoporated place under the name Oakview in the 1950 U.S. census; and then as Oak View the 1960 U.S. census. The community was redesignated as a census designated place in the 1980 U.S. census.

=== 2020 census ===
As of the 2020 census, Oak View had a population of 6,215 and a population density of 1,824.7 inhabitants per square mile (704.5/km^{2}).

The median age was 43.3 years. 20.6% of residents were under the age of 18 and 20.5% were 65 years of age or older. For every 100 females, there were 94.8 males, and for every 100 females age 18 and over there were 95.5 males age 18 and over. The census reported that 99.9% of the population lived in households, 0.1% lived in non-institutionalized group quarters, and no one was institutionalized. 97.9% of residents lived in urban areas, while 2.1% lived in rural areas.

There were 2,224 households, out of which 31.0% had children under the age of 18 living in them. Of all households, 55.7% were married-couple households, 6.8% were cohabiting couple households, 21.4% had a female householder with no spouse or partner present, and 16.1% had a male householder with no spouse or partner present. 21.4% of households were one person, and 10.8% were one person aged 65 or older. The average household size was 2.79. There were 1,584 families (71.2% of all households).

There were 2,315 housing units at an average density of 679.7 units per square mile (262.4 units/km^{2}). Of these, 2,224 (96.1%) were occupied and 91 (3.9%) were vacant. Of occupied units, 73.1% were owner-occupied and 26.9% were occupied by renters. The homeowner vacancy rate was 0.8% and the rental vacancy rate was 1.8%.

Racial composition as of the 2020 census
Race	Number	Percent
White	4,325	69.6%
Black or African American	23	0.4%
American Indian and Alaska Native	156	2.5%
Asian	80	1.3%
Native Hawaiian and Other Pacific Islander	8	0.1%
Some other race	662	10.7%
Two or more races	961	15.5%
Hispanic or Latino (of any race)	1,813	29.2%

=== Demographic estimates ===
In 2023, the US Census Bureau estimated that 8.8% of the population were foreign-born. Of all people aged 5 or older, 84.5% spoke only English at home, 11.5% spoke Spanish, 2.5% spoke other Indo-European languages, 1.2% spoke Asian or Pacific Islander languages, and 0.3% spoke other languages. Of those aged 25 or older, 88.4% were high school graduates and 30.0% had a bachelor's degree.

=== Income and poverty ===
The median household income in 2023 was $109,856, and the per capita income was $47,084. About 6.7% of families and 9.7% of the population were below the poverty line.

=== 2010 census ===
At the 2010 census Oak View had a population of 4,066. The population density was 2,072.4 inhabitants per square mile (800.2/km^{2}). The racial makeup of Oak View was 3,227 (79.4%) White, 11 (0.3%) African American, 63 (1.5%) Native American, 34 (0.8%) Asian, 3 (0.1%) Pacific Islander, 575 (14.1%) from other races, and 153 (3.8%) from two or more races. Hispanic or Latino of any race were 1,217 persons (29.9%).

The whole population lived in households, no one lived in non-institutionalized group quarters and no one was institutionalized.

There were 1,419 households, 495 (34.9%) had children under the age of 18 living in them, 790 (55.7%) were opposite-sex married couples living together, 139 (9.8%) had a female householder with no husband present, 106 (7.5%) had a male householder with no wife present. There were 104 (7.3%) unmarried opposite-sex partnerships, and 12 (0.8%) same-sex married couples or partnerships. 262 households (18.5%) were one person and 82 (5.8%) had someone living alone who was 65 or older. The average household size was 2.87. There were 1,035 families (72.9% of households); the average family size was 3.24.

The age distribution was 971 people (23.9%) under the age of 18, 356 people (8.8%) aged 18 to 24, 1,013 people (24.9%) aged 25 to 44, 1,310 people (32.2%) aged 45 to 64, and 416 people (10.2%) who were 65 or older. The median age was 39.6 years. For every 100 females, there were 100.0 males. For every 100 females age 18 and over, there were 98.8 males.

There were 1,523 housing units at an average density of 776.3 per square mile, of the occupied units 1,015 (71.5%) were owner-occupied and 404 (28.5%) were rented. The homeowner vacancy rate was 1.3%; the rental vacancy rate was 5.8%. 2,834 people (69.7% of the population) lived in owner-occupied housing units and 1,232 people (30.3%) lived in rental housing units.
