= Meiners Oaks, California =

- Unincorporated community
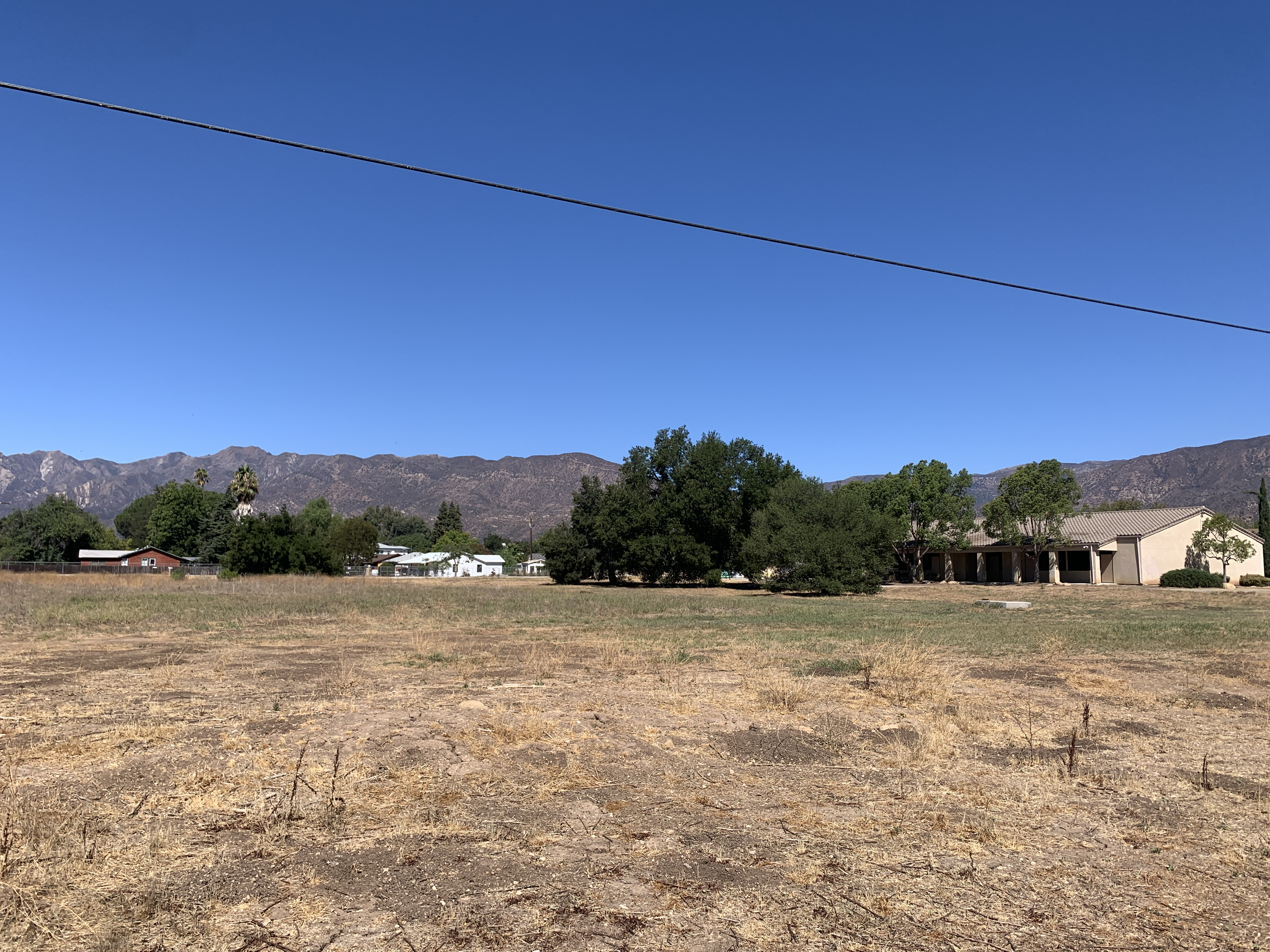

- Location in Ventura County and the state of California

- Location in Southern California Location in California Location in the United States
- Coordinates: 34°26′59″N 119°16′31″W
- Country: United States
- State: California
- County: Ventura
- Named for: John Meiners

Government
  - Senate: Monique Limón (D)
  - Assembly: Steve Bennett (D)
  - U. S. Congress: Salud Carbajal (D)

Area
  - Total: 2.438 sq mi (6.315 km^{2})
  - Land: 2.438 sq mi (6.315 km^{2})
  - Water: 0 sq mi (0 km^{2}) 0%
- Elevation: 741 ft (226 m)

Population (2020)
  - Total: 3,911
  - Density: 1,604/sq mi (619.3/km^{2})
- Time zone: UTC-8 (PST)
  - Summer (DST): UTC-7 (PDT)
- ZIP code: 93023
- Area code: 805
- FIPS code: 06-46702
- GNIS feature ID: 1661004

Meiners Oaks is an unincorporated community lying west of the city of Ojai in Ventura County, California, United States. The population was 3,911 at the 2020 census. For statistical purposes, the United States Census Bureau has defined Meiners Oaks as a census-designated place (CDP).

== History ==
German native John Meiners had immigrated to America in 1848 and established a successful brewing operation in Milwaukee. In the 1870s, he acquired the land that would become Meiners Oaks as payment for a debt. When a friend and business associate, Edward D. Holton, travelled through California and investigated the land, Meiners learned that he had acquired one of the largest oak groves on flat ground in southern California. Upon arriving in person, Meiners also found the climate agreeable, and established a ranch. Several hundred acres, north of the oak grove, were used quite successfully to grow lemons, oranges, plums, apricots and apples, as well as oats, wheat, barley and more. Meiners lived on his ranch intermittently until his death in 1898.

== Geography ==
Meiners Oaks is in the mid-northern section of the Ojai Valley, and is bordered by the community of Mira Monte to the south, and the City of Ojai to the east. Meiners Oaks is in the heart of the Ojai Valley, very close to the Ventura River, where there are several hiking trails.

The community is 70 miles (110 km) north of Los Angeles. The census bureau definition of the area as a CDP may not precisely correspond to local understanding of the area with the same name.

=== Climate ===
The climate of Meiners Oaks is Mediterranean, characterized by hot, dry summers, at times exceeding 100 °F or 37.8 °C, and mild, rainy winters, with lows at night falling below freezing at times. During dry spells with continental air, morning temperatures, due to Ojai's valley location, can drop well below most of Southern California, with the record being 13 °F (−10.6 °C) on January 6 and 7 of 1913. On the other hand, Meiners Oaks is far enough from the sea to minimize marine cooling, and very hot days can occur during summer, with the record being 119 °F (48.3 °C) on June 16, 1917 – when it fell as low as 65 °F (18.3 °C) in the morning due to clear skies and dry air.

Typically for much of coastal southern California, most precipitation falls in the form of rain between the months of October and April, with intervening dry summers. As with all of Southern California, rain falls on few days, but when it does rain it is often extremely heavy: the record being 9.05 inches (229.9 mm) on February 24, 1913, followed by 8.15 inches (207.0 mm) on January 26, 1914. During the wettest month on record of January 1969, 25.76 inches or 654.3 millimetres fell, with a whopping 23.46 inches (595.9 mm) in eight days from January 19 to January 26. In contrast, the median annual rainfall for all years in Meiners Oaks is only around 18.1 inches or 460 millimetres and in the driest "rain year" from July 2006 to June 2007, just 6.87 inches or 174.5 millimetres fell in twelve months. The wettest "rain year" was from July 1997 to June 1998 with 48.29 inches (1,226.6 mm).

Climate data for Meiners Oaks, California (normals, extremes since 1905)
| Month | Jan | Feb | Mar | Apr | May | Jun | Jul | Aug | Sep | Oct | Nov | Dec | Year |
|---|---|---|---|---|---|---|---|---|---|---|---|---|---|
| Record high °F (°C) | 91 (33) | 92 (33) | 98 (37) | 104 (40) | 105 (41) | 119 (48) | 117 (47) | 115 (46) | 114 (46) | 108 (42) | 100 (38) | 94 (34) | 119 (48) |
| Mean daily maximum °F (°C) | 67.1 (19.5) | 67.3 (19.6) | 70.0 (21.1) | 73.2 (22.9) | 76.2 (24.6) | 80.4 (26.9) | 85.5 (29.7) | 86.8 (30.4) | 84.6 (29.2) | 78.9 (26.1) | 72.6 (22.6) | 66.8 (19.3) | 75.8 (24.3) |
| Daily mean °F (°C) | 53.6 (12.0) | 54.2 (12.3) | 56.6 (13.7) | 59.3 (15.2) | 62.9 (17.2) | 66.9 (19.4) | 71.3 (21.8) | 71.5 (21.9) | 69.6 (20.9) | 64.3 (17.9) | 58.0 (14.4) | 53.1 (11.7) | 61.8 (16.5) |
| Mean daily minimum °F (°C) | 40.1 (4.5) | 41.1 (5.1) | 43.2 (6.2) | 45.3 (7.4) | 49.5 (9.7) | 53.3 (11.8) | 57.1 (13.9) | 56.2 (13.4) | 54.6 (12.6) | 49.7 (9.8) | 43.3 (6.3) | 39.3 (4.1) | 47.7 (8.7) |
| Record low °F (°C) | 13 (−11) | 22 (−6) | 25 (−4) | 27 (−3) | 31 (−1) | 34 (1) | 40 (4) | 39 (4) | 37 (3) | 27 (−3) | 23 (−5) | 16 (−9) | 13 (−11) |
| Average rainfall inches (mm) | 4.81 (122) | 5.68 (144) | 4.36 (111) | 1.04 (26) | 0.48 (12) | 0.08 (2.0) | 0.03 (0.76) | 0.08 (2.0) | 0.41 (10) | 0.57 (14) | 1.46 (37) | 2.79 (71) | 21.79 (551.76) |
| Average rainy days (≥ 0.01 inch) | 6.4 | 6.2 | 6.8 | 2.9 | 1.6 | 0.6 | 0.3 | 0.3 | 1.2 | 2.0 | 3.2 | 4.3 | 35.8 |
Source 1:
Source 2:

== Demographics ==
Historical population
| Census | Pop. | Note | %± |
|---|---|---|---|
| 1950 | 2,446 | | — |
| 1960 | 3,513 | | 43.6% |
| 1970 | 7,025 | | 100.0% |
| 1980 | 9,512 | | 35.4% |
| 1990 | 3,329 | | −65.0% |
| 2000 | 3,750 | | 12.6% |
| 2010 | 3,571 | | −4.8% |
| 2020 | 3,911 | | 9.5% |
| 2021 (est.) | 4,065 | ▲ | 3.9% |
U.S. Decennial Census; 1850–1870 1880-1890; 1900 1910 1920; 1930 1940 1950; 1960 1970 1980; 1990 2000 2010

Meiners Oaks first appeared as an unincoporated place in the 1950 U.S. census; renamed Meiners Oaks-Mira Monte in the 1970 U.S. census; and redesignated as a census designated place in the 1980 U.S. census. The name was changed back to Meiners Oaks for the 1980 U.S. census. Prior to the 1990 U.S. census, the Mira Monte CDP was split out of the Meiners Oaks CDP.

=== 2020 census ===
As of the 2020 census, Meiners Oaks had a population of 3,911 and a population density of 1,604.2 inhabitants per square mile (619.4/km^{2}). The median age was 44.3 years. 20.5% of residents were under the age of 18, 6.6% were aged 18 to 24, 23.7% were aged 25 to 44, 26.9% were aged 45 to 64, and 22.3% were 65 years of age or older. For every 100 females, there were 98.4 males, and for every 100 females age 18 and over there were 95.8 males.

The census reported that 100.0% of the population lived in households, 1 person (0.0%) lived in non-institutionalized group quarters, and no one was institutionalized. 99.2% of residents lived in urban areas, while 0.8% lived in rural areas.

There were 1,461 households, out of which 30.6% included children under the age of 18, 47.0% were married-couple households, 9.0% were cohabiting couple households, 26.1% had a female householder with no spouse or partner present, and 17.9% had a male householder with no spouse or partner present. 25.1% of households were one person, and 15.7% were one person aged 65 or older. The average household size was 2.68. There were 966 families (66.1% of all households).

There were 1,556 housing units at an average density of 638.2 units per square mile (246.4 units/km^{2}), of which 1,461 (93.9%) were occupied. Of the occupied units, 66.9% were owner-occupied and 33.1% were occupied by renters. The homeowner vacancy rate was 0.7%, and the rental vacancy rate was 3.3%.

Racial composition as of the 2020 census
| Race | Number | Percent |
|---|---|---|
| White | 2,649 | 67.7% |
| Black or African American | 21 | 0.5% |
| American Indian and Alaska Native | 59 | 1.5% |
| Asian | 63 | 1.6% |
| Native Hawaiian and Other Pacific Islander | 10 | 0.3% |
| Some other race | 492 | 12.6% |
| Two or more races | 617 | 15.8% |
| Hispanic or Latino (of any race) | 1,163 | 29.7% |

=== Income and poverty ===
In 2023, the US Census Bureau estimated that the median household income was $90,096, and the per capita income was $54,551. About 10.8% of families and 9.7% of the population were below the poverty line.

=== 2010 census ===
At the 2010 census Meiners Oaks had a population of 3,571. This reflects a decrease in population of 4.8%, as compared with the 2000 census. The population density was 2,535.8 inhabitants per square mile (979.1/km^{2}). The racial makeup of Meiners Oaks was 2,789 (78.1%) White, 14 (0.4%) African American, 58 (1.6%) Native American, 51 (1.4%) Asian, 1 (0.0%) Pacific Islander, 549 (15.4%) from other races, and 109 (3.1%) from two or more races. Hispanic or Latino of any race were 1,068 persons (29.9%).

The census reported that 3,565 people (99.8% of the population) lived in households, 6 (0.2%) lived in non-institutionalized group quarters, and no one was institutionalized.

There were 1,283 households, 460 (35.9%) had children under the age of 18 living in them, 607 (47.3%) were opposite-sex married couples living together, 178 (13.9%) had a female householder with no husband present, 81 (6.3%) had a male householder with no wife present. There were 101 (7.9%) unmarried opposite-sex partnerships, and 11 (0.9%) same-sex married couples or partnerships. 311 households (24.2%) were one person and 130 (10.1%) had someone living alone who was 65 or older. The average household size was 2.78. There were 866 families (67.5% of households); the average family size was 3.24.

The age distribution was 851 people (23.8%) under the age of 18, 300 people (8.4%) aged 18 to 24, 845 people (23.7%) aged 25 to 44, 1,116 people (31.3%) aged 45 to 64, and 459 people (12.9%) who were 65 or older. The median age was 40.2 years. For every 100 females, there were 92.4 males. For every 100 females age 18 and over, there were 91.4 males.

There were 1,396 housing units at an average density of 991.3 per square mile, of the occupied units 798 (62.2%) were owner-occupied and 485 (37.8%) were rented. The homeowner vacancy rate was 1.1%; the rental vacancy rate was 6.7%. 2,200 people (61.6% of the population) lived in owner-occupied housing units and 1,365 people (38.2%) lived in rental housing units.

== Education ==
Schools in Meiners Oaks are served by the Ojai Unified School District, including Meiners Oaks Elementary School. There are also several private schools located in Meiners Oaks.

== Libraries ==
Public Libraries: Ventura County Library - 14 locations with three branches in the Ojai Valley: Meiners Oaks Library, Ojai Library, and Oak View Library.

== See also ==
- Oak Grove School (Ojai, California)
- Nordhoff High School
