= Mira Monte, California =

Rural community in Ventura County, California, United States

- Unincorporated community Census designated place
- Location in Ventura County and the state of California
- Coordinates: 34°25′39″N 119°17′27″W
- Country: United States
- State: California
- County: Ventura

Government
  - State senator: Monique Limón (D)
  - Assemblymember: Steve Bennett (D)
  - U. S. rep.: Salud Carbajal (D)

Area
  - Total: 4.832 sq mi (12.515 km^{2})
  - Land: 4.815 sq mi (12.471 km^{2})
  - Water: 0.017 sq mi (0.045 km^{2}) 0.36%
- Elevation: 643 ft (196 m)

Population (April 1, 2020)
  - Total: 6,618
  - Density: 1,374/sq mi (530.7/km^{2})
- Time zone: UTC-8 (Pacific)
  - Summer (DST): UTC-7 (PDT)
- ZIP code: 93023
- Area code: 805
- FIPS code: 06-48046
- GNIS feature ID: 1661036

Mira Monte (/ˌmɪərə ˈmɒnti/; Spanish for "Mountain View") is a rural community in Ventura County, California, United States. Mira Monte is located in between the communities of Oak View, Meiners Oaks, and southwest of the City of Ojai, California. For statistical purposes, the United States Census Bureau has defined Mira Monte as a census-designated place (CDP). The census definition of the area may not precisely correspond to local understanding of the area with the same name. According to the 2020 census, the population of Mira Monte is 6,618, down from 6,845 at the 2010 census. The U.S. census of 2023 shows that Mira Monte had a population of 7,301 (683 more people since 2020).

== History ==
When the Spanish arrived in the 1770s, the Chumash Indians populated the area. Thousands of years before that, an even more ancient people called the Milling Stone Horizon Native American tribe (of Millingstone Horizon era) were the area's inhabitants.

The Ventura and Ojai Valley Railroad ran through Mira Monte since it was completed in 1898, until 1969, when the tracks were washed out in a major storm. The Maricopa Highway (Highway SR-33) was built in 1933 by the state to connect Carpinteria with California's Central Valley. This made Mira Monte into a transit hub.

== Geography ==
The Ventura River forms the western boundary of the community with the base of Sulfur mountain running along the east boundary. State Route 33 and SR 150 bisect the community.

== Education ==
Mira Monte is served by the Ojai Unified School District. There is one public school within the town, Mira Monte Elementary School. Other Mira Monte schools are its first school, Villanova Preparatory (designed by A.C.Martin, the same architect of the Ventura County Courthouse, which became the Ventura County City Hall) and Valley Oak Charter.

The Krotona Institute of Theosophy has half of the scenic open space along Highway 33. In the other half of the scenic fields there is the Krishnamurti Foundation of America.

== Demographics ==
Historical population
Census	Pop.	Note	%±
1990	7,744		—
2000	7,177		−7.3%
2010	6,854		−4.5%
2020	6,618		−3.4%
U.S. Decennial Census; 1850–1870 1880-1890; 1900 1910 1920; 1930 1940 1950; 1960 1970 1980; 1990 2000 2010

Mira Monte first appeared as a census designated place prior to the 1990 U.S. census after being separated from the Meiners Oaks CDP.

=== 2020 census ===
As of the 2020 census, Mira Monte had a population of 6,618 and a population density of 1,374.5 inhabitants per square mile (530.7/km^{2}). The median age was 51.7 years. 16.5% of residents were under the age of 18 and 28.8% were 65 years of age or older. For every 100 females, there were 89.8 males, and for every 100 females age 18 and over, there were 86.1 males age 18 and over.

The census reported that 99.3% of the population lived in households, 0.0% lived in non-institutionalized group quarters, and 0.6% were institutionalized. In addition, 93.5% of residents lived in urban areas, while 6.5% lived in rural areas.

There were 2,688 households, of which 21.5% had children under the age of 18 living in them. Of all households, 48.8% were married-couple households, 6.0% were cohabiting-couple households, 14.2% were households with a male householder and no spouse or partner present, and 31.0% were households with a female householder and no spouse or partner present. About 29.5% of all households were made up of individuals, 20.1% had someone living alone who was 65 years of age or older, and the average household size was 2.45. There were 1,700 families (63.2% of all households).

There were 2,861 housing units at an average density of 594.2 units per square mile (229.4 units/km^{2}), of which 6.0% were vacant. Of occupied units, 79.3% were owner-occupied and 20.7% were occupied by renters. The homeowner vacancy rate was 0.7% and the rental vacancy rate was 5.4%.

Racial composition as of the 2020 census
Race	Number	Percent
White	4,956	74.9%
Black or African American	41	0.6%
American Indian and Alaska Native	72	1.1%
Asian	179	2.7%
Native Hawaiian and Other Pacific Islander	5	0.1%
Some other race	528	8.0%
Two or more races	837	12.6%
Hispanic or Latino (of any race)	1,410	21.3%

=== Demographic estimates ===
In 2023, the US Census Bureau estimated that 9.2% of the population were foreign-born. Of all people aged 5 or older, 84.2% spoke only English at home, 11.4% spoke Spanish, 4.3% spoke other Indo-European languages, 0.1% spoke Asian or Pacific Islander languages, and 0.0% spoke other languages. Of those aged 25 or older, 94.3% were high school graduates and 43.0% had a bachelor's degree.

=== Income and poverty ===
The median household income in 2023 was $77,900, and the per capita income was $45,022. About 11.2% of families and 17.5% of the population were below the poverty line.

=== 2010 census ===
The 2010 United States census reported that Mira Monte had a population of 6,854. The population density was 1,494.1 inhabitants per square mile (576.9/km^{2}). The racial makeup of Mira Monte was 5,989 (87.4%) White, 43 (0.6%) African American, 61 (0.9%) Native American, 129 (1.9%) Asian, 3 (0.0%) Pacific Islander, 406 (5.9%) from other races, and 223 (3.3%) from two or more races. Hispanic or Latino of any race were 1,254 persons (18.3%).

The Census reported that 6,824 people (99.6% of the population) lived in households, 30 (0.4%) lived in non-institutionalized group quarters, and 0 (0%) were institutionalized.

There were 2,800 households, out of which 742 (26.5%) had children under the age of 18 living in them, 1,436 (51.3%) were opposite-sex married couples living together, 274 (9.8%) had a female householder with no husband present, 130 (4.6%) had a male householder with no wife present. There were 115 (4.1%) unmarried opposite-sex partnerships, and 22 (0.8%) same-sex married couples or partnerships. 792 households (28.3%) were made up of individuals, and 439 (15.7%) had someone living alone who was 65 years of age or older. The average household size was 2.44. There were 1,840 families (65.7% of all households); the average family size was 2.97.

The population was spread out, with 1,330 people (19.4%) under the age of 18, 488 people (7.1%) aged 18 to 24, 1,286 people (18.8%) aged 25 to 44, 2,301 people (33.6%) aged 45 to 64, and 1,449 people (21.1%) who were 65 years of age or older. The median age was 48.0 years. For every 100 females, there were 93.2 males. For every 100 females age 18 and over, there were 90.0 males.

There were 3,009 housing units at an average density of 655.9 per square mile (253.2/km^{2}), of which 2,227 (79.5%) were owner-occupied, and 573 (20.5%) were occupied by renters. The homeowner vacancy rate was 2.2%; the rental vacancy rate was 4.0%. 5,338 people (77.9% of the population) lived in owner-occupied housing units and 1,486 people (21.7%) lived in rental housing units.
