= Upper Ojai, California =

Unincorporated community in California, United States

Coordinates: 34.436°N 119.167°W

Upper Ojai (/ˈoʊhaɪ/) is a rural valley with several unincorporated communities in Ventura County, California, United States.

It is located east of city of Ojai on State Route 150 (Ojai−Santa Paula Road), between Ojai and Santa Paula.

Upper Ojai is at an elevation of 800 feet (240 m) above Ojai, thereby getting its name.

It is home to the Besant Hill School, a private boarding school for grades 9 to 12; and to the Topa Institute retreat center.
