= Ventura County, California =

Ventura County
- County
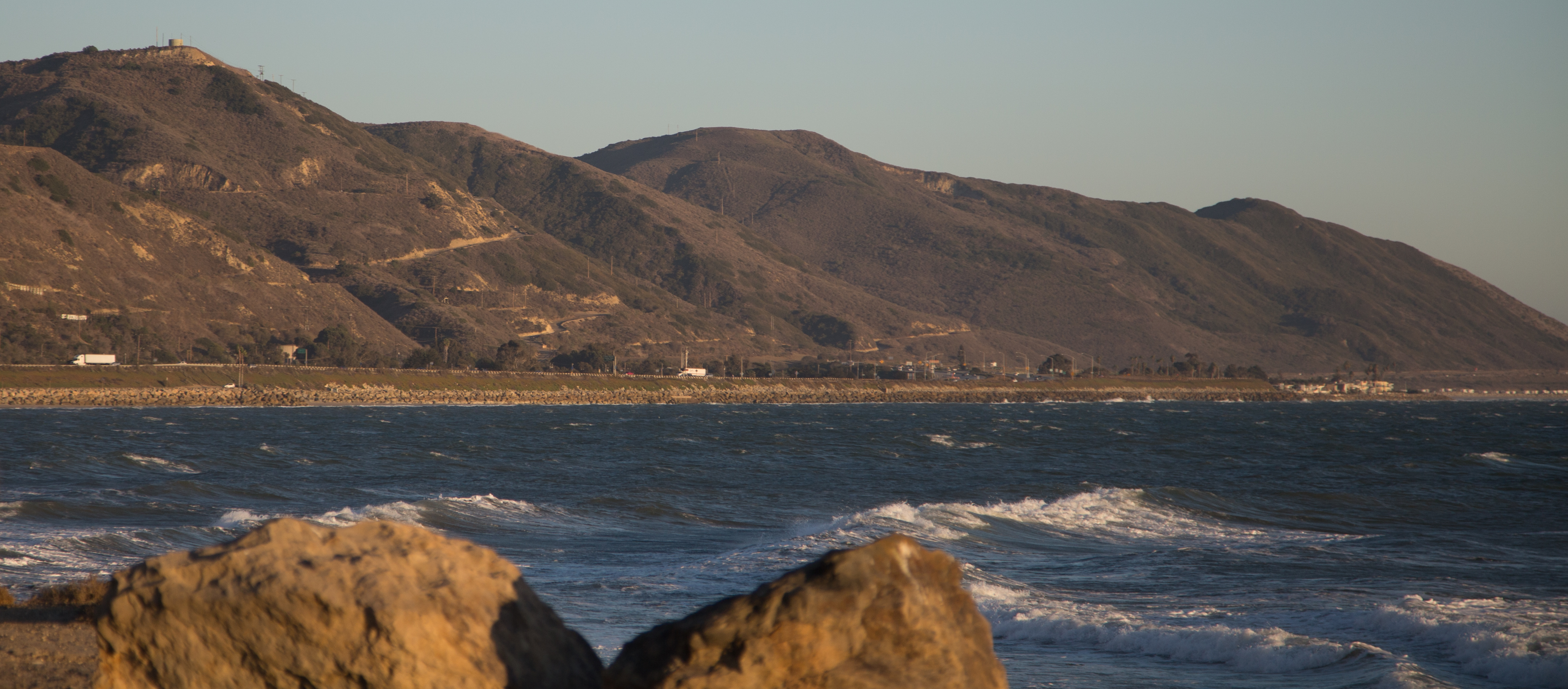
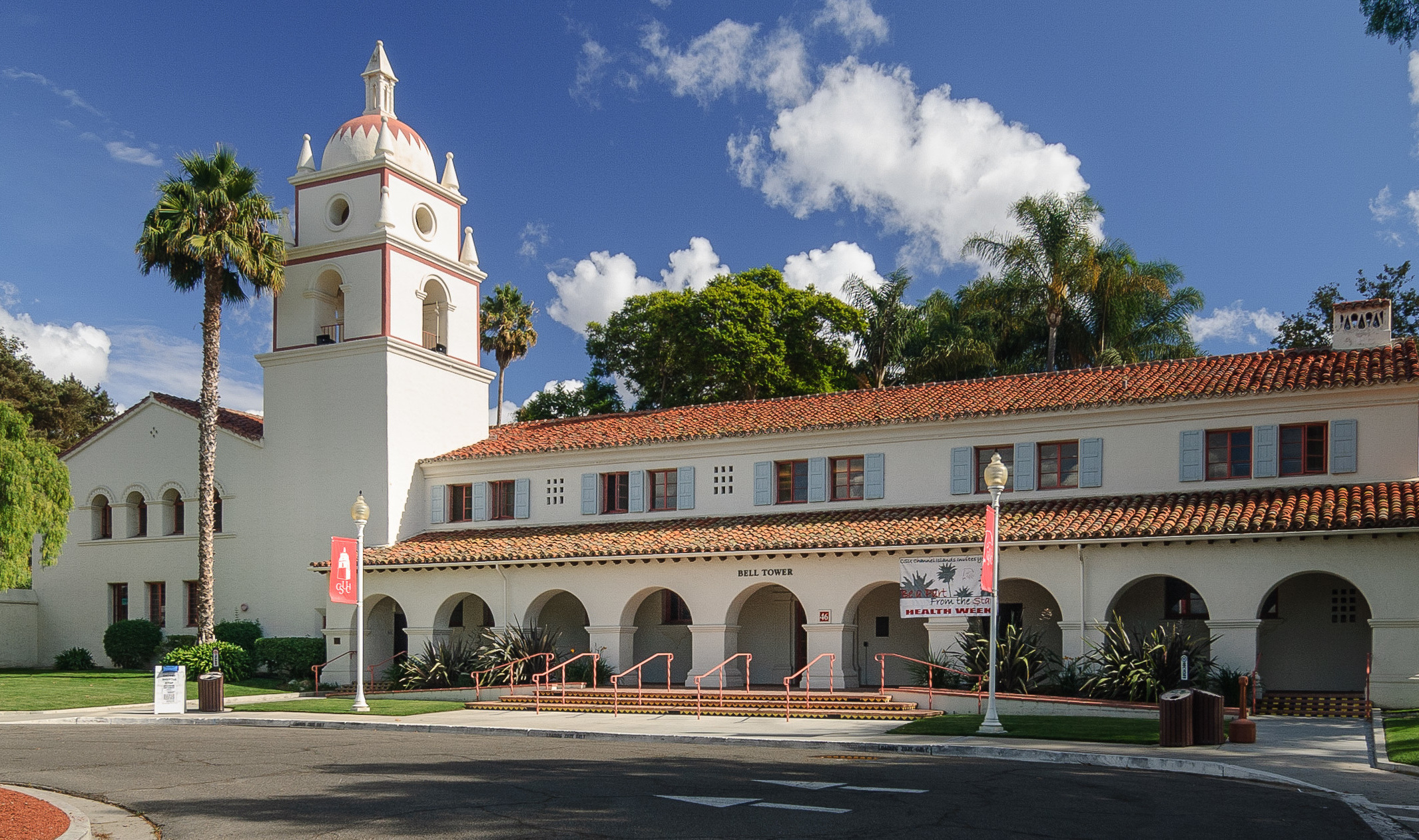
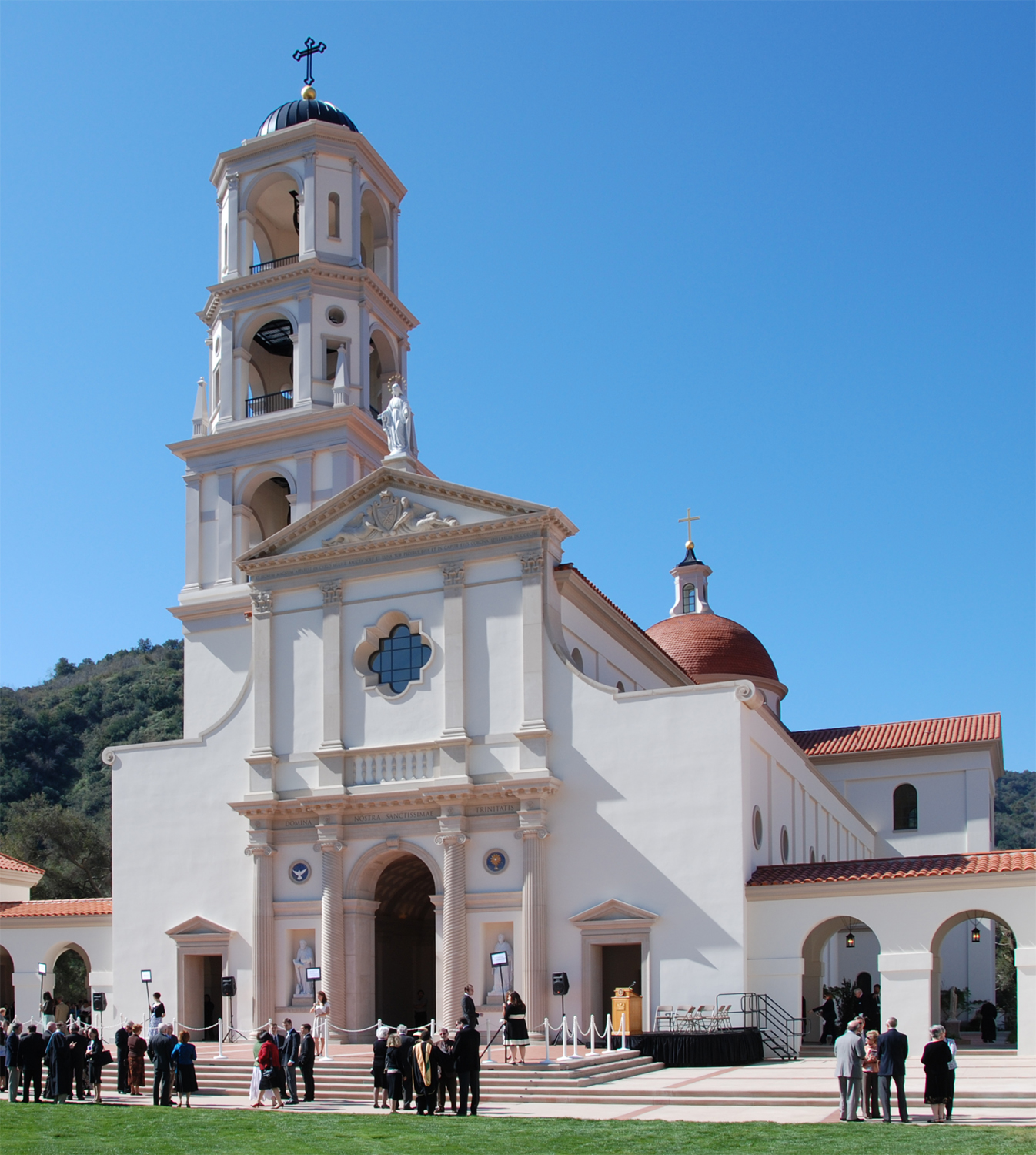
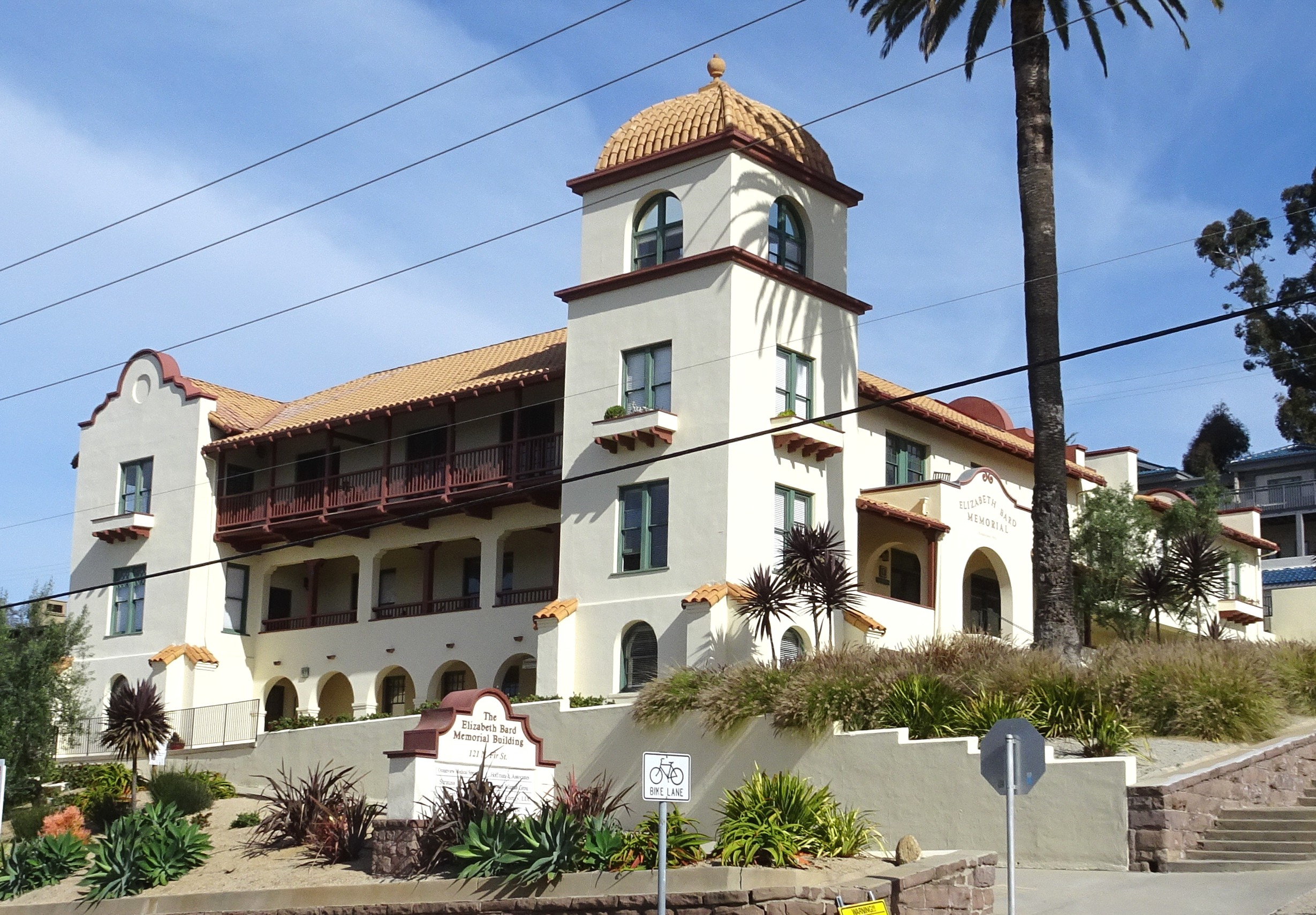
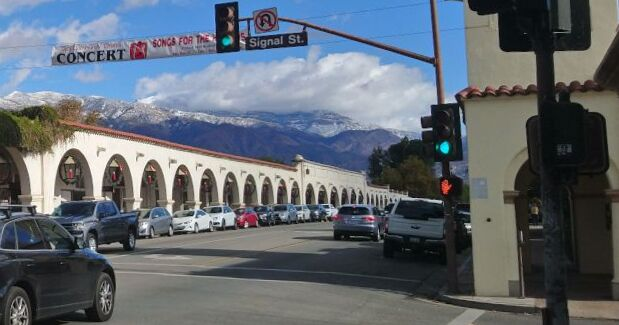
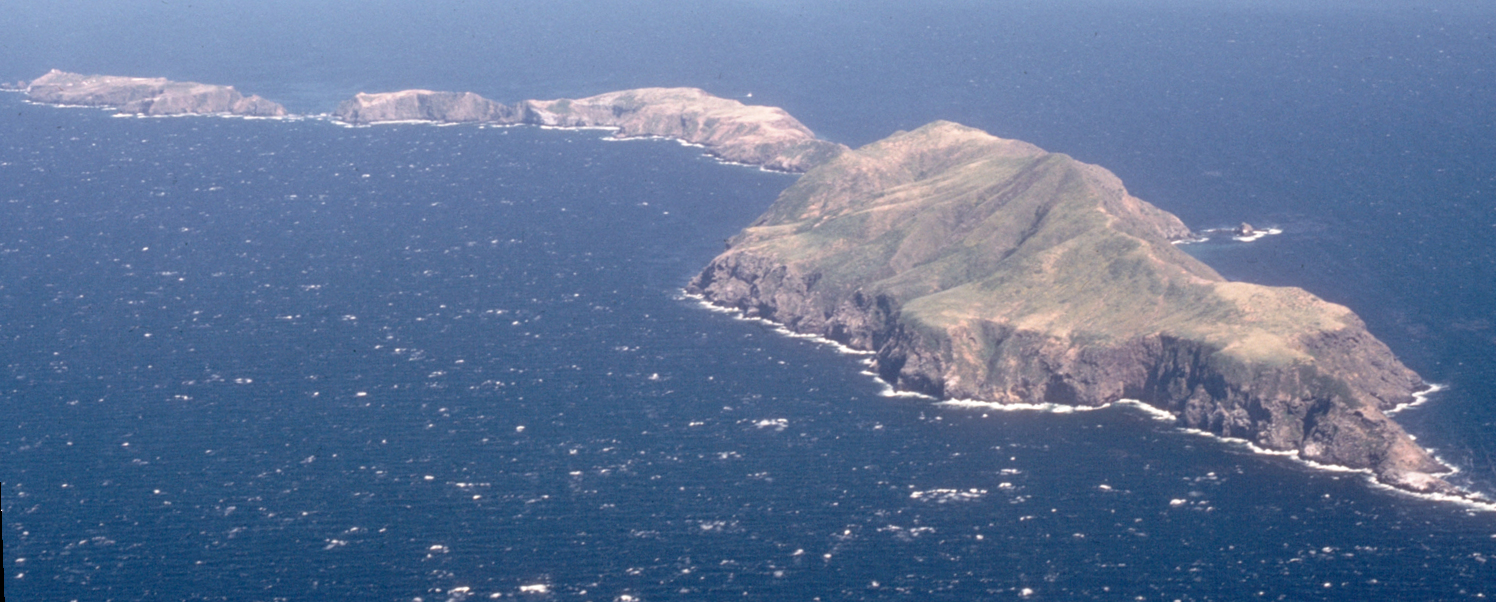
- Central Coast near Faria, California Camarillo, California Santa Paula, California Ventura, California Ojai, California Anacapa Island in the Channel Islands

- Flag Seal
- Interactive map of Ventura County
- Location in the state of California
- Country: United States
- State: California
- Region: Greater Los Angeles; California Central/South Coast
- Created: March 22, 1872
- Established: January 1, 1873
- Named for: Mission San Buenaventura, which was named after Saint Bonaventure
- County seat: Ventura
- Largest city: Oxnard (population); Thousand Oaks (area)

Government
  - Type: Council–CEO
  - Body: Board of Supervisors
  - Chair: Jeff Gorell
  - Vice Chair: Vianey Lopez
  - Board of Supervisors: Supervisors: Matt LaVere; Jeff Gorell; Kelly Long; Janice S. Parvin; Vianey Lopez
  - Chief executive officer: Sevet Johnson

Area
  - Total: 2,207 sq mi (5,720 km^{2})
  - Land: 1,841 sq mi (4,770 km^{2})
  - Water: 366 sq mi (950 km^{2})
- Highest elevation: 8,835 ft (2,693 m)

Population (April 1, 2020)
  - Total: 843,843
  - Estimate (2025): 830,851 ▼
  - Density: 458/sq mi (177/km^{2})

GDP
  - Total: $62.329 billion (2022)
- Time zone: UTC−8 (Pacific Time Zone)
  - Summer (DST): UTC−7 (Pacific Daylight Time)
- Area codes: 805/820, 818/747
- FIPS code: 06-111
- GNIS feature ID: 277320
- Congressional districts: 24th, 26th, 32nd
- Website: venturacounty.gov

Ventura County (/vɛnˈtʊərə/) is a southern county in the U.S. state of California. As of the 2020 census, the population was 843,843. The county seat is the city of Ventura, and the largest city in the county is Oxnard.

Ventura County comprises the Oxnard–Thousand Oaks–Ventura, CA Metropolitan Statistical Area, which is part of the Greater Los Angeles area (Los Angeles–Long Beach, CA Combined Statistical Area). It is also considered the southernmost county along the California Central Coast.

Two of the Channel Islands are part of the county: Anacapa Island, which is the most visited island in Channel Islands National Park, and San Nicolas Island.

== History ==
=== Indigenous ===
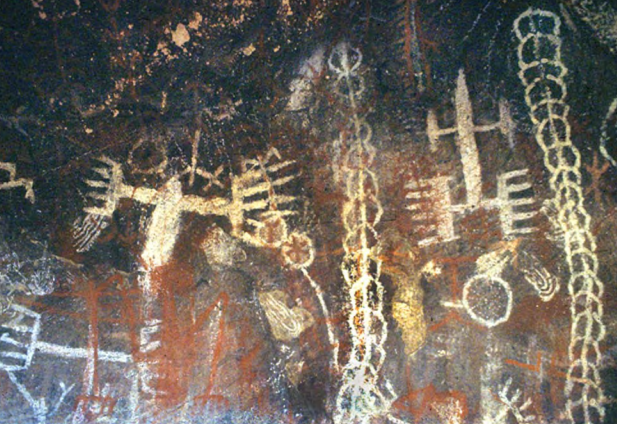
Pictographs in the Burro Flats Painted Cave in Simi Valley

Ventura County was historically inhabited by the Chumash people, who also settled much of Santa Barbara and San Luis Obispo Counties, with their presence dating back 10,000–12,000 years. The Chumash were hunter-gatherers, fishermen, and also traders with the Mojave, Yokuts, and Tongva Indians. The Chumash are also known for their rock paintings and for their great basketry. Chumash Indian Museum in Thousand Oaks has several reconstructed Chumash houses ('apa) and there are several Chumash pictographs in the county, including the Burro Flats Painted Cave in Simi Valley. The plank canoe, called a tomol in Chumash, was important to their way of life. Canoe launching points on the mainland for trade with the Chumash of the Channel Islands were located at the mouth of the Ventura River, Mugu Lagoon and Point Hueneme. This has led to speculations among archeologists of whether the Chumash could have had a pre-historic contact with Polynesians. According to diachronic linguistics, certain words such as tomolo'o (canoe) could be related to Polynesian languages. The dialect of the Chumash language that was spoken in Ventura County was Ventureño.

Several place names in the county have originated from Chumash, including Ojai, which means moon, and Simi Valley, which originates from the word Shimiyi and refers to the stringy, thread-like clouds that typify the region. Others include Point Mugu from the word Muwu (meaning "beach"), Saticoy from the word Sa'aqtiko'y (meaning "sheltered for the wind"), and Sespe Creek from the word S'eqp'e (meaning "kneecap").

=== Spanish period ===
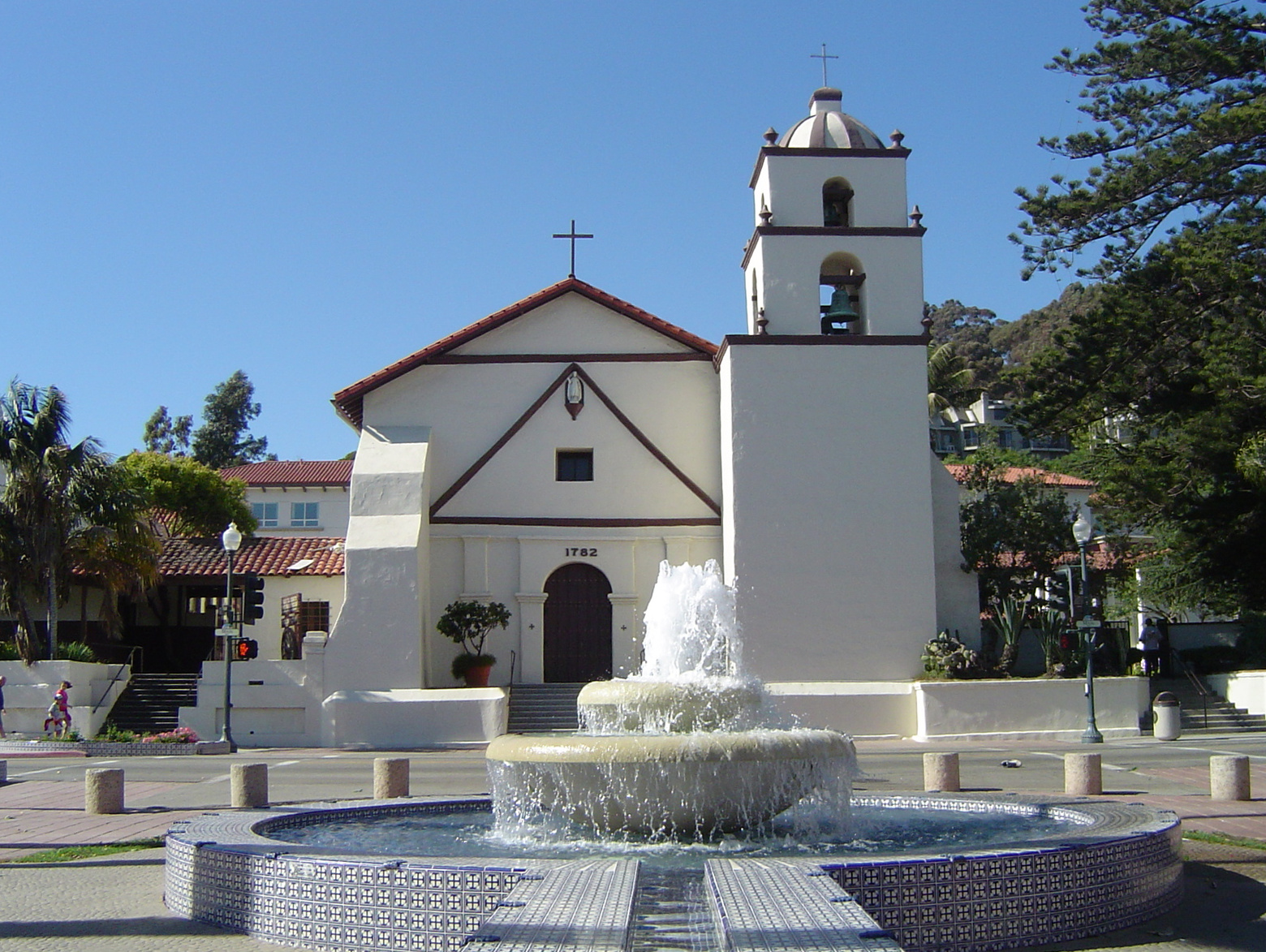
Mission San Buenaventura is a Spanish mission founded in 1782 by the Franciscan order.

In October 1542, the expedition led by Juan Rodríguez Cabrillo anchored in an inlet near Point Mugu; its members were the first Europeans to arrive in the area that would become Ventura County.

Active occupation of California by Spain began in 1769. Gaspar de Portolà led a military expedition by land from San Diego to Monterey, passing through Ventura County in August of that year. A priest with the expedition, Father Juan Crespí, kept a journal of the trip and noted that the area was ideal for a mission to be established and it was a "good site to which nothing is lacking". Also on this expedition was Father Junípero Serra, who later founded a mission on this site.

On March 31, 1782, the Mission San Buenaventura was founded by Father Serra. It is named after Saint Bonaventure, one of the early intellectual founders of the Franciscan order. The town that grew up around the mission was originally named San Buenaventura (and retains the name officially), it has been known as Ventura since 1891.

In the 1790s, the Spanish Governor of California began granting land concessions to Spanish Californians who were often retiring soldiers. These concessions were known as ranchos and consisted of thousands of acres of land that were used primarily as ranch land for livestock. In Ventura County, Rancho Simi was granted in 1795 and Rancho El Conejo in 1802. Fernando Tico was granted Ojai and part of Ventura by Gov. Alvarado.

=== Mexican period ===
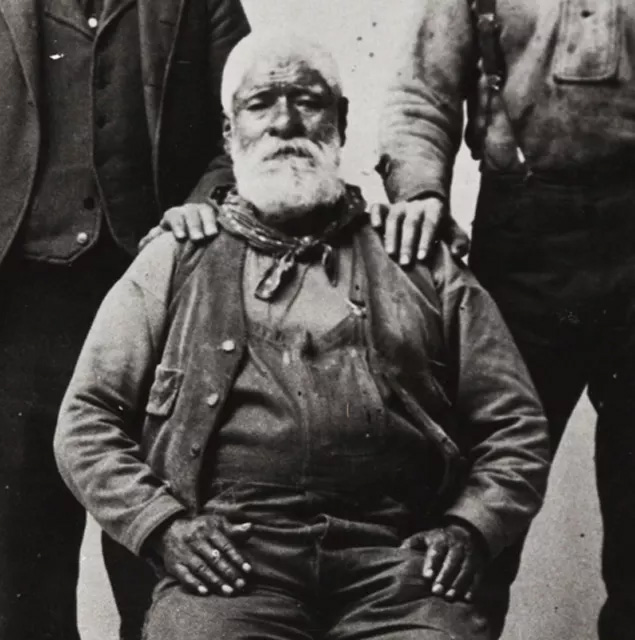
Chumash elder and master builder Fernando Librado, or Kitsepawit, was born at Mission San Buenaventura during the Mexican period.

In 1822, California was notified of Mexico's independence from Spain and the Governor of California, the Junta, the military in Monterey and the priests and neophytes at Mission San Buenaventura swore allegiance to Mexico on April 11, 1822. California land that had been vested in the King of Spain was now owned by the nation of Mexico.

By the 1830s, Mission San Buenaventura was in a decline with fewer neophytes joining the mission. The number of cattle owned by the mission dropped from first to fifteenth ranking in the California Missions. The missions were secularized by the Mexican government in 1834. The Mexican governors began granting land rights to Mexican Californians, often retiring soldiers. By 1846, there were 19 rancho grants in Ventura County. In 1836, Mission San Buenaventura was transferred from the Church to a secular administrator. The natives who had been working at the mission gradually left to work on the ranchos. By 1839, only 300 Indians were left at the Mission and it slipped into neglect.

Several outhouses dating back to the 1800s were discovered in July 2007, at a site that had been cleared to prepare for development. The area proved to be a treasure trove for archaeologists who braved the lingering smell in the dirt to uncover artifacts that showed heavy utilization by mission inhabitants, Indians, early settlers and Spanish and Mexican soldiers.

=== American period ===
The Mexican–American War began in 1846 but its effect was not felt in Ventura County until 1847. In January of that year, Captain John C. Frémont led the California Battalion into San Buenaventura to find that the Europeans had fled, leaving only Native Americans in the Mission. Fremont and the Battalion continued south to sign the Treaty of Cahuenga with General Andrés Pico. The Treaty of Guadalupe Hidalgo formally transferred California to the United States in 1848.

By 1849, a constitution had been adopted for the California territory. The new Legislature met and divided the pending state into 27 counties. At the time, the area that would become Ventura County was the southern part of Santa Barbara County.

The 1860s brought many changes to the area. A drought caused many of the ranchos to experience financial difficulties and most were divided, sub-divided and sold. Large sections of land were bought by eastern capitalists based on favorable reports of petroleum deposits. A United States Post Office was opened at Mission San Buenaventura in 1861. On April 1, 1866, the town of San Buenaventura was incorporated, becoming the first officially recognized town in what would become Ventura County.

On January 1, 1873, Ventura County was officially split from Santa Barbara County, bringing a flurry of change. That same year, a courthouse and wharf were built in San Buenaventura. A bank was opened and the first public library was created. The school system grew, with the first high school opening in 1890.

Other towns were being established in the county. A plan for Hueneme (later Port Hueneme) was recorded in 1874, and Santa Paula's plan was recorded in 1875. Along the banks of the Santa Clara River, the township of New Jerusalem (which would eventually be named El Rio) was founded in 1875 by the owner of general store named Simon Cohen who became its first postmaster and banker in 1882. The community of Nordhoff (later renamed Ojai) was started in 1874. Bardsdale, Fillmore, Piru, and Montalvo were established in 1887. 1892 saw Simi (later Simi Valley), Somis, Saticoy, and Moorpark. Oxnard was a latecomer, not being established until 1898.

The Southern Pacific Railroad laid tracks through San Buenaventura in 1887. For convenience in printing their timetables, Southern Pacific shortened San Buenaventura to Ventura. The Post Office soon followed suit. While the city remains officially known as San Buenaventura, it is more commonly referred to as Ventura. The rail line to Northern California originally went through Saugus, Fillmore and Santa Paula, providing a boom to those communities along the line. In 1905, Tunnel #26 was completed between Chatsworth and Corriganville near Simi Valley, shortening the rail route. At a length of 7,369 feet (2,246 m), Tunnel #26 was the longest tunnel ever constructed in its day. This tunnel joined to the railroad spur coming the other direction from Montalvo through Camarillo, Moorpark and Simi Valley, making the contemporary main line used today. One stop along the way, at a 90-degree turn, was at a sugar beet processing factory. The factory bore the name of its absentee owners, the Oxnard Brothers. A small community of farm and factory workers grew near the train stop. That community, now bearing the name of the factory shortened to the one word train stop Oxnard, has become the largest city in Ventura County.

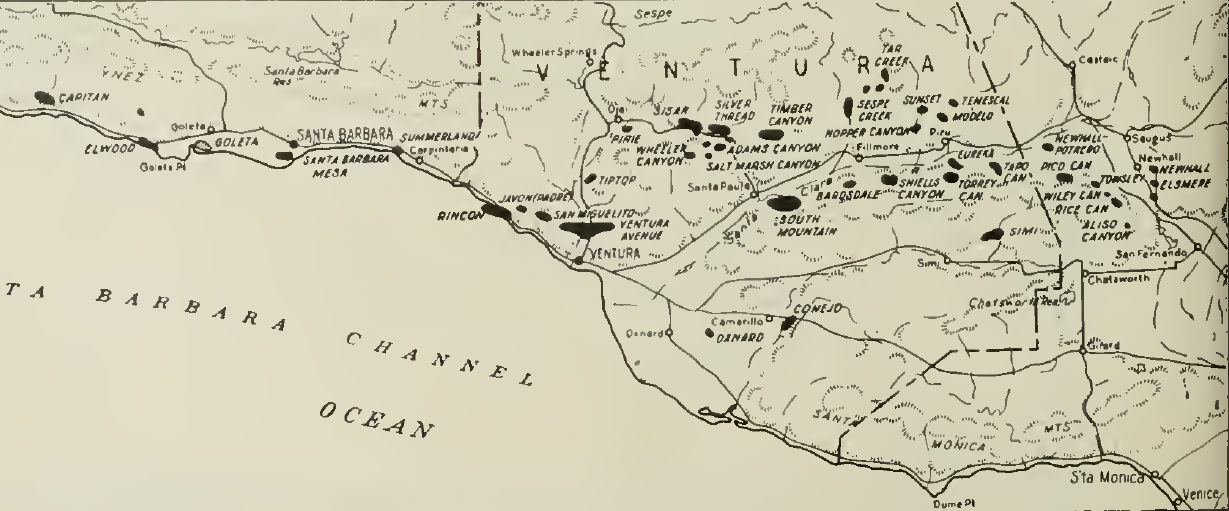
Map of Ventura oil and gas fields

Oil has been known in Ventura County since before the arrival of the Europeans, as the native Chumash people used tar from natural seeps as a sealant and waterproofing for baskets and canoes. In the 1860s, several attempts were made to harvest the petroleum products under Ventura County but none were financially successful, and the oil speculators eventually changed from oil to land development. In 1913, oil exploration began in earnest, with Ralph Lloyd obtaining the financial support of veteran oil man Joseph B. Dabney. Their first well, named "Lloyd No. 1", was started on January 20, 1914. The well struck oil at 2,558 feet (780 m) but was destroyed when it went wild. Other wells met a similar fate, until 1916, when a deal was struck with the Shell Oil Company. 1916 was the year that the large South Mountain Oil Field was discovered; other deals followed with General Petroleum in 1917 and Associated Oil Company in 1920. At its peak, the largest oil field in the county, the Ventura Avenue oilfield, discovered in 1919 in the hills north of Ventura, was producing 90,000 barrels (14,000 m^{3}) of oil a day, with annual production of over 1.5 million barrels. More oil fields came online in the 1920s and 1930s, with the Rincon field, the second largest, in 1927, and the adjacent San Miguelito in 1931.

In the early hours of the morning of March 12–13, 1928, the St. Francis Dam collapsed, sending nearly 12,500 million U.S. gallons (47 gigaliters) of water rushing through the Santa Clarita Valley killing as many as 600 people, destroying 1,240 homes and flooding 7,900 acres (32 km^{2}) of land, devastating farm fields and orchards. This was the single largest disaster to strike Ventura County and the second largest, in terms of lives lost, in the state.

=== Modern period ===
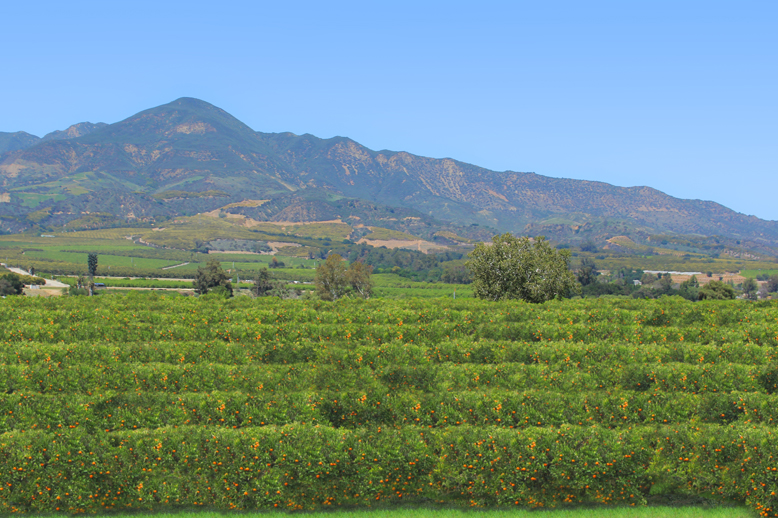
Orange grove outside of Santa Paula, California

Typical rush-hour traffic in Ventura

Ventura County can be separated into two major parts, East County and West County, which are divided by the Conejo Grade. East County consists of all cities east of the Conejo Grade. Geographically East County is the end of the Santa Monica Mountains, in which the Conejo Valley is located, and where there is a considerable increase in elevation. Communities which are considered to be in the East County are Thousand Oaks, Newbury Park, Lake Sherwood, Hidden Valley, Santa Rosa Valley, part of Westlake Village, Oak Park, Moorpark, and Simi Valley. A majority of these communities are in the Conejo Valley.

West County, which is everything west of the Conejo Grade, consists of communities such as Camarillo, Oxnard, Somis, Point Mugu, Port Hueneme, Ventura, Ojai, Santa Paula, and Fillmore. West County consists of some of the first developed cities in the county. The largest beach communities are located in West County on the coastline of the Channel Islands Harbor.

Starting in the mid-20th century, there was a large growth in population in the East County, moving from the San Fernando Valley in Los Angeles and out into the Conejo and Simi Valleys. Part of the Conejo Valley is situated in Los Angeles County. This part consists of Calabasas, Hidden Hills, Agoura Hills, Agoura, and Westlake Village. The other half of the Conejo Valley, which belongs to Ventura County, consists of Lake Sherwood, Hidden Valley, Oak Park, Thousand Oaks, and Newbury Park, which was formerly an unincorporated area that is now the most westerly part of Thousand Oaks. Many working-class people migrated to this area during the 1960s and 1970s out of East and Central Los Angeles. As a result, there was a large growth in population into the Conejo Valley and into Ventura County through the U.S. Route 101 corridor. Making the U.S. 101 a full freeway in the 1960s, and the expansions that followed, helped make commuting to Los Angeles easier and opened the way for development westward. The communities that have seen the most substantial development are Calabasas, Hidden Hills, Agoura Hills, Westlake Village, Thousand Oaks, and Newbury Park. The neighboring East County area of Simi Valley saw its already considerable population of nearly 60,000 inhabitants in 1970 grow to over 100,000 over the following two decades.

Development moved farther down the U.S. 101 corridor and sent population rising in West County cities as well. The largest population growth there has been in Camarillo, Oxnard, and Ventura. Development in the East County and along the US 101 corridor is rare today, because most of these cities, such as Thousand Oaks and Simi Valley, are approaching build-out. Although the area still has plenty of open space and land, almost all of it is in greenbelts between the cities. Because of this, its private low-key location, its country feel, and its proximity to Los Angeles, the Conejo Valley area has become a very attractive place to live. Like most areas of Ventura County, it once had relatively inexpensive real estate, but prices have risen sharply. For example, real estate in Newbury Park has increased in price by more than 250% in the last 10 years.

==== Thomas Fire ====
The Thomas Fire was a massive wildfire that affected Ventura and Santa Barbara Counties, and one of multiple wildfires that ignited in Southern California in December 2017. It burned approximately 281,893 acres (440 sq mi; 114,078 ha), becoming the largest wildfire in modern California history, before it was fully contained on January 12, 2018.

The Thomas Fire destroyed at least 1,063 structures, while damaging 280 others; and the fire caused over $2.176 billion (2018 USD) in damages, including more than $204.5 million in suppression costs, becoming the seventh-most destructive wildfire in state history. The agriculture industry suffered at least $171 million in losses due to the Thomas Fire. Southern California Edison paid the county over $11 million in claims related to damages and costs since its equipment was likely associated with one ignition point of the fire near Santa Paula.

== Geography ==
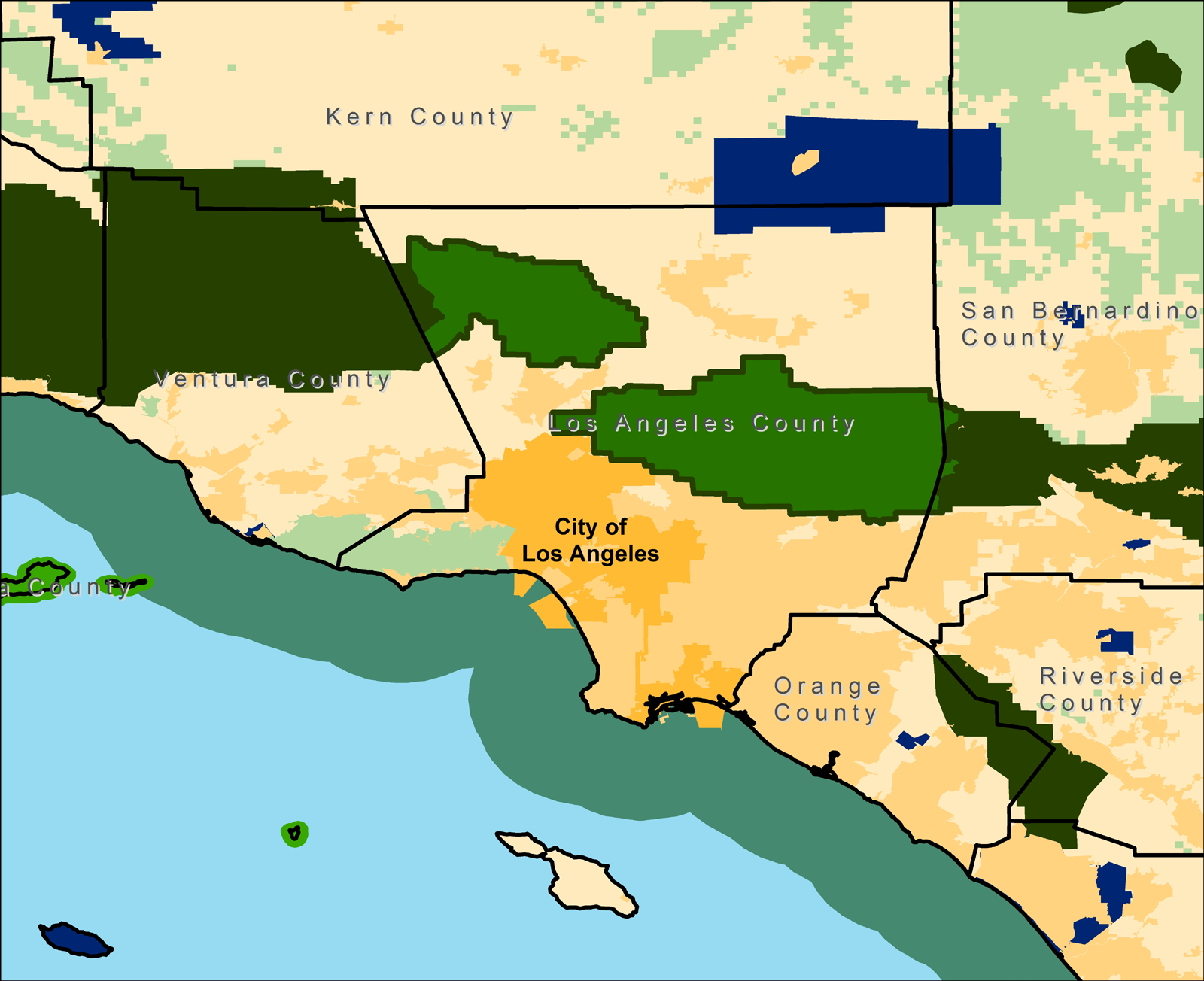
53 percent of the county's total area is made up of national forest land.

According to the U.S. Census Bureau, the county has a total area of 2,208 square miles (5,720 km^{2}), of which 1,843 square miles (4,770 km^{2}) is land and 365 square miles (950 km^{2}) (16.5%) is water.

Parts of the county are on the Oxnard Plain which includes the cities of Oxnard, Camarillo, Port Hueneme and much of Ventura. Other cities and communities lie in the intermountain valleys of the Transverse Range. The Santa Clara River Valley is the most prominent valley, while other valleys include Conejo Valley, Simi Valley, Santa Rosa Valley, Tierra Rejada Valley and Las Posas Valley. Other parts of the county are on small coastal mountains, such as the Santa Ynez Mountains, Simi Hills, Santa Monica Mountains and the Piru Mountains. Most of the population of Ventura County lives in the southern portion of the county. The major population centers are the Oxnard Plain and the Simi and Conejo Valleys. In local media, the county is usually split between the eastern portion, generally associated with the San Fernando Valley, and the western portion, often referred to as "Oxnard-Ventura". To the east is Los Angeles County.

Because the total amount of precipitation is small, conserving water and obtaining water from additional sources outside of Ventura County are vital concerns. The climate, though mostly mild and dry, varies because of the variations in topography through for instance differences in elevation and physical geography. The Santa Clara River is the principal waterway. Lake Casitas, an artificial reservoir, is the largest body of water.

The highest peaks in the county include Mount Pinos (8,831 ft; 2,692 m), Frazier Mountain (8,017 ft; 2,444 m), and Reyes Peak (7,525 ft; 2,294 m) in the Transverse Ranges. The uplands are well-timbered with coniferous forests, and receive plentiful snow in the winter. Mount Pinos is sacred to the Chumash Indians. It is known to them as Iwihinmu, and was considered to be the center of the universe; being the highest peak in the vicinity, it has unimpeded views in three directions.

The USDA Economic Research Service rated Ventura County the most desirable county to live in the 48 contiguous states, using six metrics of climate ("mild, sunny winters, temperate summers, low humidity"), topographic variation, and access to water, "that reflect environmental qualities most people prefer."

=== Physical geography ===
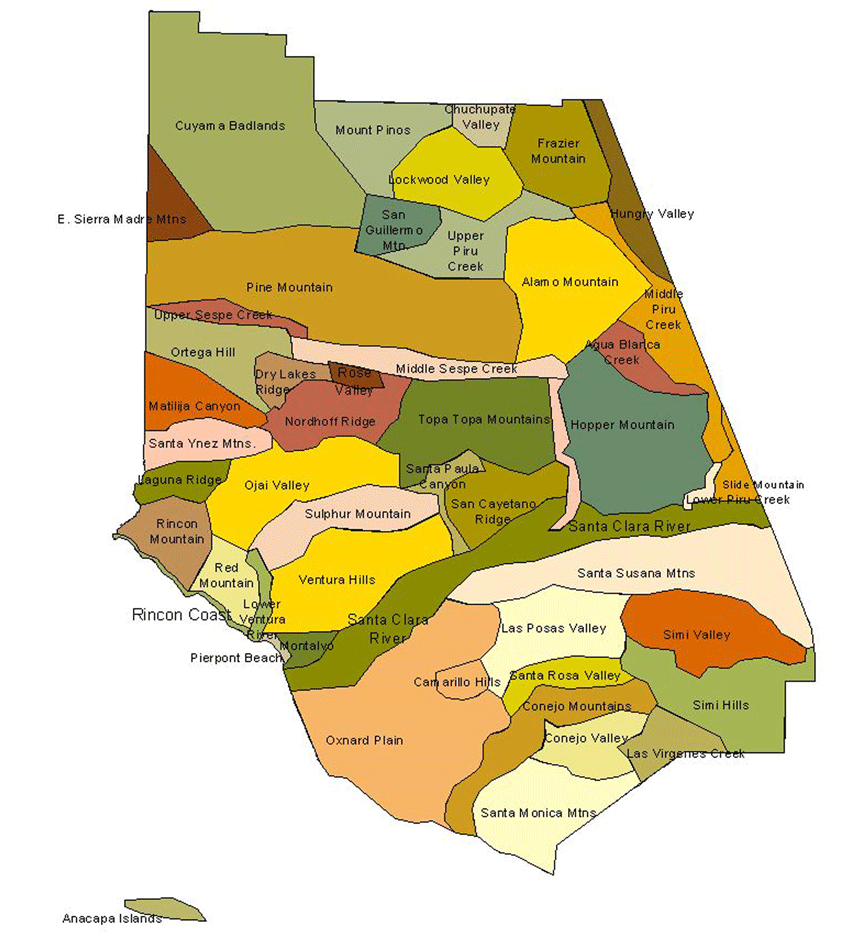
Map of Ventura County with physiographical place names

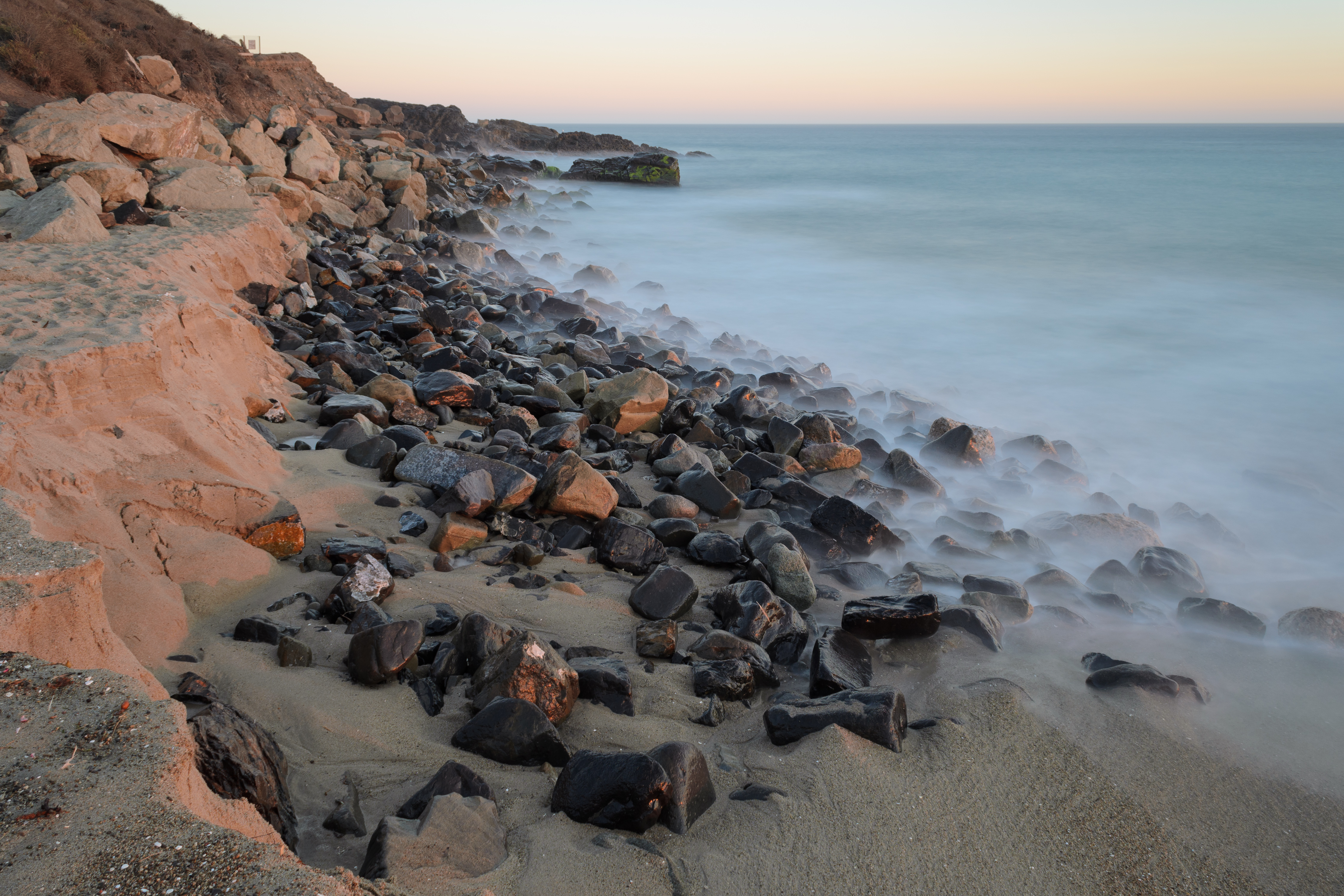
Coastline at Point Mugu State Park

There are 555,953 acres (224,986 ha) outside of national forest land in Ventura County, which means that 53 percent of the county's total area is made up of national forest. Of the land outside of national forest land, approximately 59 percent is agricultural and 17.5 percent urban. North of Highway 126, the county is mountainous and mostly uninhabited, and contains some of the most unspoiled, rugged and inaccessible wilderness remaining in southern California. Most of this land is in the Los Padres National Forest, and includes the Chumash Wilderness in the northernmost portion, adjacent to Kern County, as well as the large Sespe Wilderness and portions of both the Dick Smith Wilderness and Matilija Wilderness (both of these protected areas straddle the line with Santa Barbara County). All of the wilderness areas are within the jurisdiction of Los Padres National Forest.

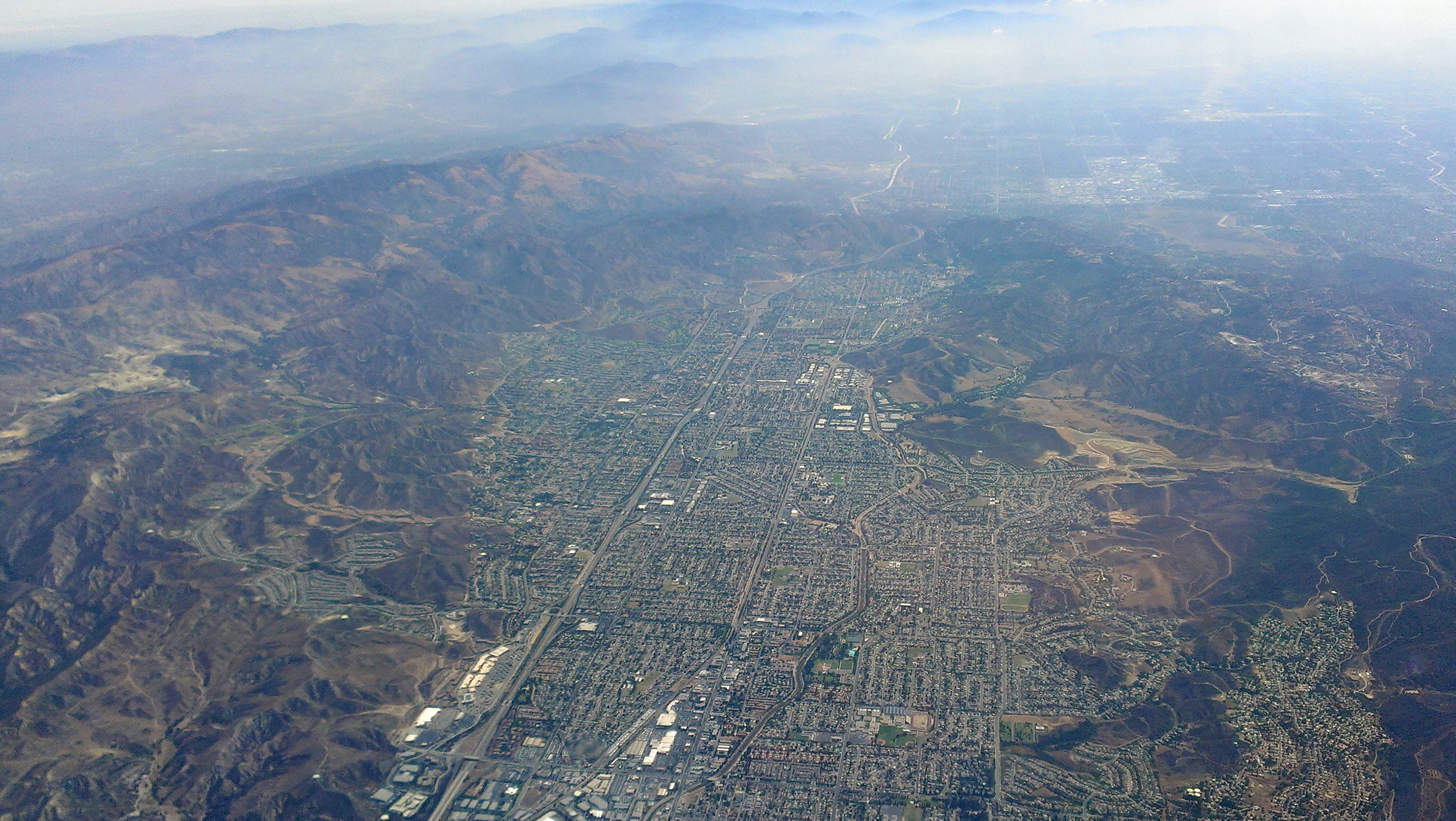
Simi Valley in the valley of the same name, in the southeast corner of the county

The coastal plain was formed by the deposition of sediments from the Santa Clara River and from the streams of the Calleguas-Conejo drainage system. It has a mean elevation of fifty feet (15 m), but at points south of the Santa Clara River, the elevation is as much as 150 feet (46 m), and at points north of the river, as much as 300 feet (91 m). The coastal plain is generally known as the Oxnard Plain with the part that centers on Camarillo lying east of the Revelon Slough is called Pleasant Valley. Most of the arable land in the county is found on the coastal plain. Small coastal mountains rim Ventura County on its landward side. They range in elevation from 50 feet (15 m) along the coast south of the coastal plain, to about 3,100 feet (940 m) in the Santa Monica Mountains. The Santa Ynez Mountains, the Topatopa Mountains, and the Piru Mountains make up the northern boundary of the coastal plain, the Santa Susana Mountains are alongside the eastern boundary of the county, and the Simi Hills and the Santa Monica Mountains are along the southern border with Los Angeles County. South Mountain and Oak Ridge are low and long mountains that separate Santa Clara Valley from the Las Posas Valley and Simi Valley. The Camarillo Hills and the Las Posas Hills extend from Camarillo to Simi Valley and separate the Las Posas-Simi area from the Santa Rosa Valley and Tierra Rejada Valley.

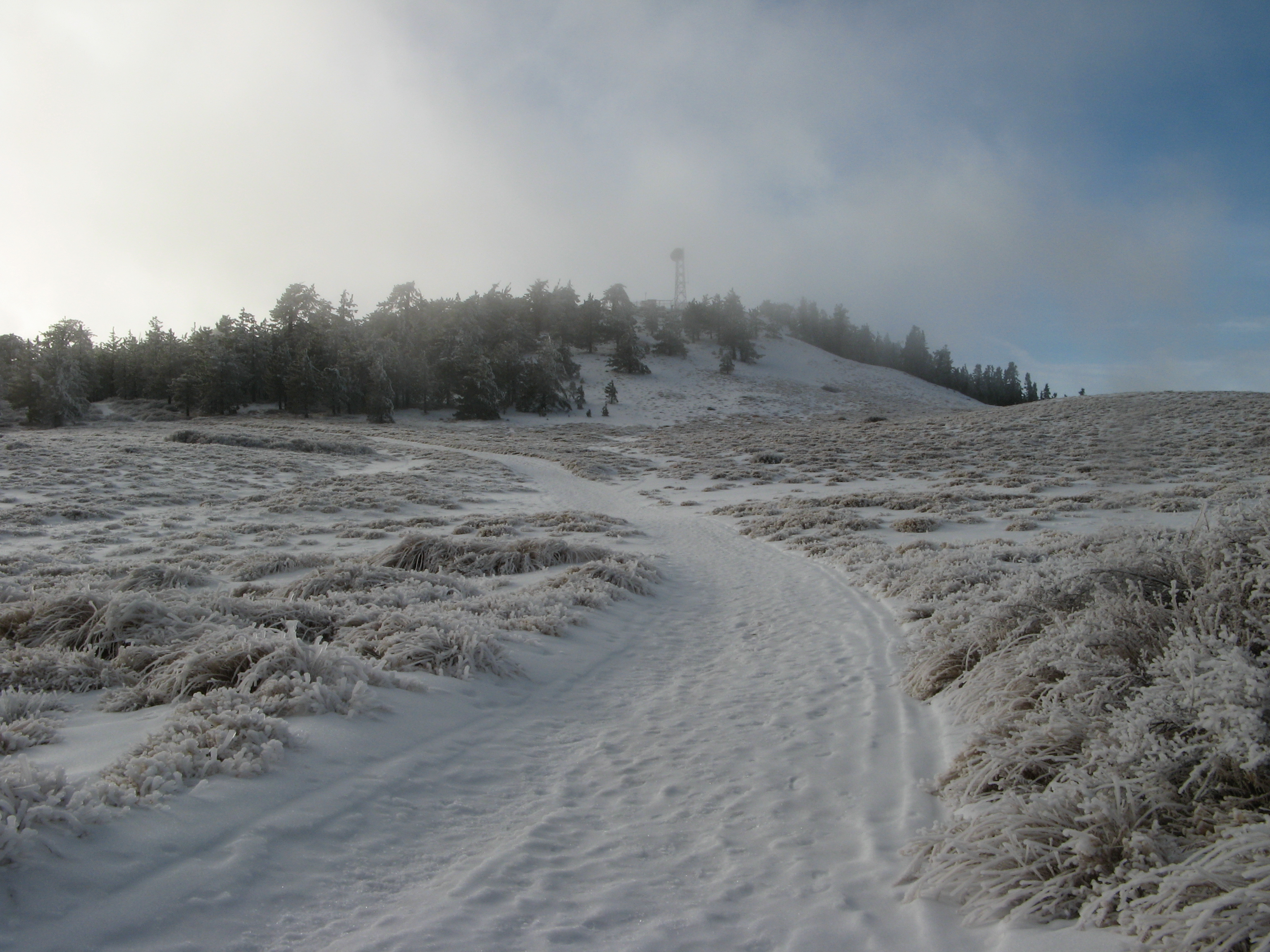
Summit of Mount Pinos, the highest point in the county

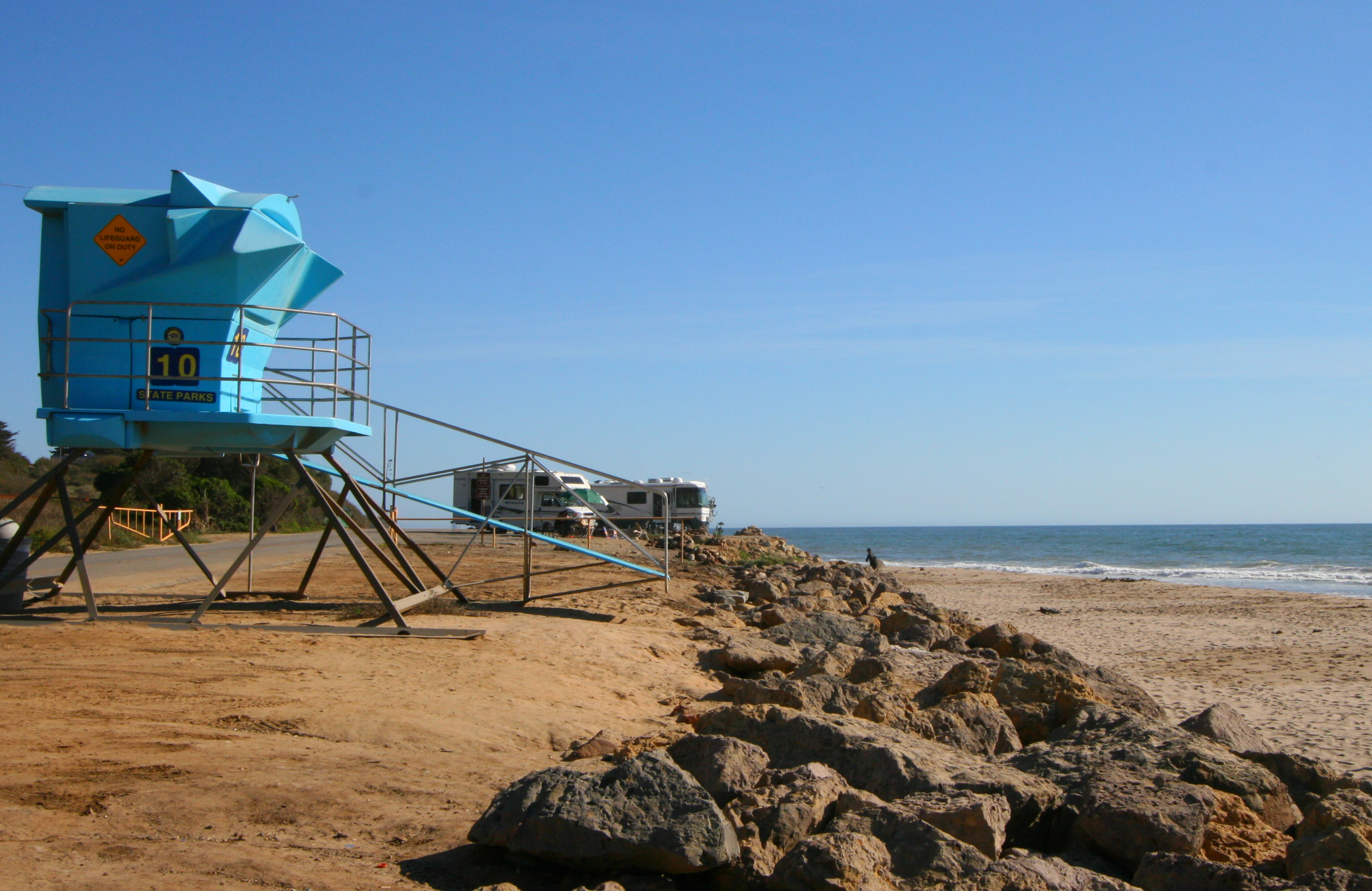
Emma Wood State Beach is located west of the City of Ventura.

The intermountain valley of the Santa Clara River is the most prominent valley in the county and trends east–southwest. The Santa Clara River drains an area of 1,605 square miles (4,160 km^{2}) and flows from its headwaters in Los Angeles to where it empties into the Pacific. Its principal tributaries are Piru Creek, Santa Paula Creek, and Sespe Creek. The valley of the Ventura River is a narrow valley north of Ventura. Ojai Valley is connected to the Ventura River Valley by San Antonio Creek. The small Upper Ojai Valley, east of Ojai Valley and 300 to 500 feet (91 to 152 m) higher, drains to the Ventura River on the west and to Santa Paula Creek on the east. Ojai and Upper Ojai Valleys are surrounded by mountains and are rich agricultural areas. The Ventura River flows south and drains an area of 226 square miles (590 km^{2}). Over South Mountain and Oak Ridge, south of the Santa Clara River, are Las Posas Valley and Simi Valley. Las Posas Valley extends eastward from the Oxnard Plain almost to Simi Valley, which is in the east end of Ventura County. The city of Simi Valley is bounded on the east by the Santa Susana Mountains and on the south by the Simi Hills. To the south, over the Camarillo- and Las Posas Hills, are Santa Rosa- and Tierra Rejada Valleys, which extend from Camarillo eastward for ten miles (16 km). In the hills south of Santa Rosa Valley is the broad Conejo Valley. Santa Rosa Valley, Conejo Valley, Simi Valley, and Tierra Rejada Valley are drained by Calleguas Creek and its principal tributary, Conejo Creek. These creeks originate in the Santa Susana and Santa Monica Mountains.

The county's diverse 43-mile (69 km) coastline features a variety of terrain. There are many State beaches: Emma Wood, San Buenaventura, McGrath, and Mandalay State Beach. Other beaches include Channel Islands Beach, Solimar Beach, Oxnard Beach Park, and Silver Strand Beach. While Point Mugu State Park is known for its steep coastal terrain with little beach access, nearby County Line Beach in the south coast community of Solromar is part of the fabled Malibu coastline. Ventura County has plenty of other surf spots along the coast including the notable surf spot, Rincon Point, on the Santa Barbara County-line.

The Channel Islands in Ventura County are Anacapa and San Nicholas Islands.

=== Climate ===
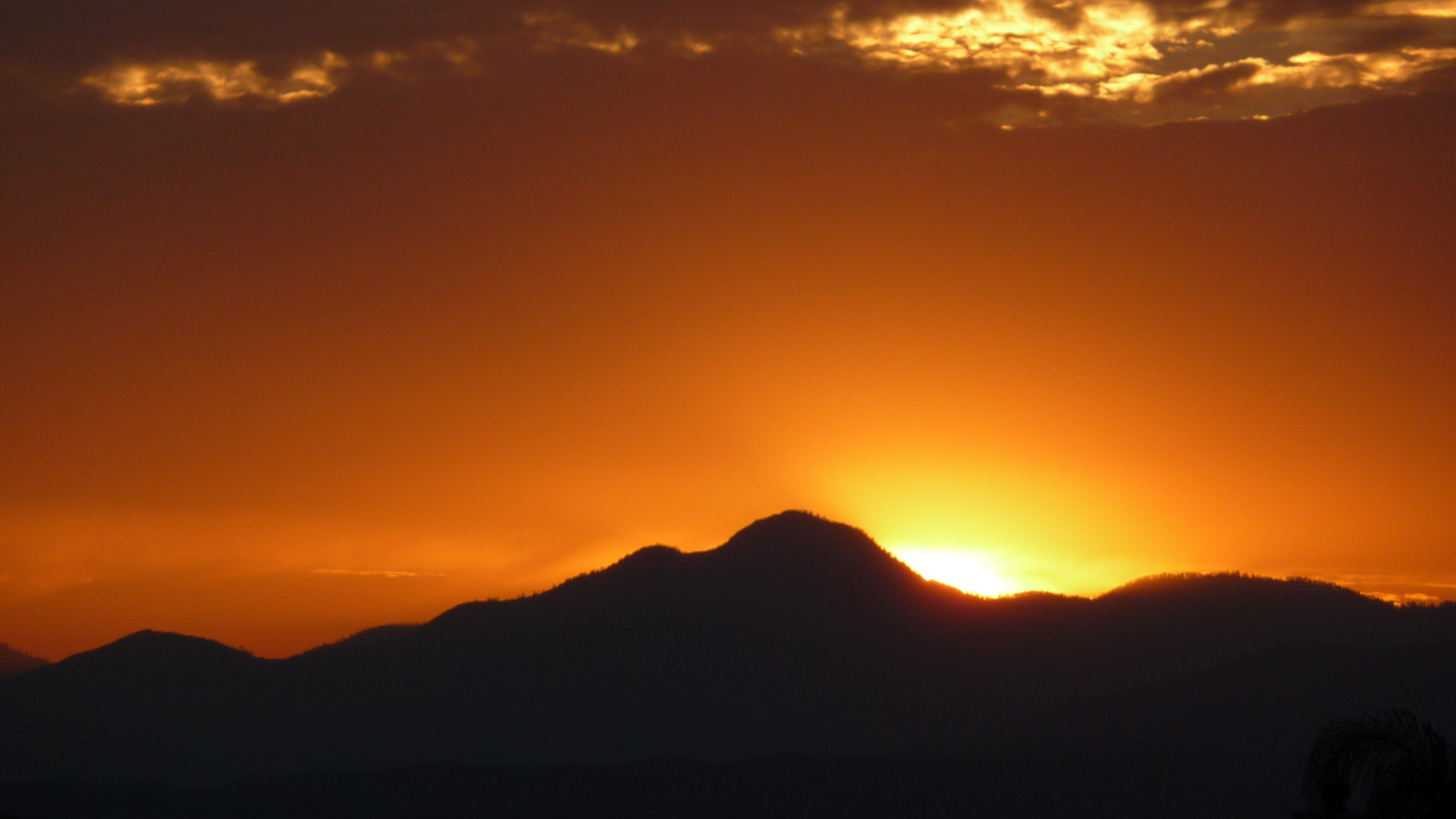
Sunset over the Topatopa Mountains in northern Ventura County

Ventura County has a considerable range in climate because of differences in topography between one part of the county and another. Rainfall is limited in summer and crops have to be irrigated. The average annual temperature is near 60 °F at low elevations near the ocean, in the 50s over most of the northern two-thirds of the county, and less than 45 °F in the Topatopa Mountains. The annual range in temperature is between 70 °F and 80 °F on the Coastal Plain and as much as 100 °F in the interior. For July, the average maximum temperature is between 70 °F and 80 °F on the Coastal Plain but exceeds 90 °F in the upper part of the Ventura- and Cuyama River Valleys. For January, the average minimum temperature is near 40 °F on the coast but in the lower 30s and upper 20s in the northern parts of Ventura County. No temperature data are available for the highest point in the county, Mount Pinos. The length of the growing season ranges more than 300 days near the coast to less than 175 days in the coldest part in northern Ventura County. In both the northern and southern ends of the county, the annual precipitation totals between ten and fifteen inches. In the Topatopa Mountains, the annual total is more than thirty-three inches. The drier parts of the county get less than five inches of rain annually, and the higher and wetter parts get more than 60 inches annually. Measurable amounts of rainfall in Ventura County are reported on thirty to thirty-five days annually, and half an inch or more on six to twelve days annually. In the northern parts of Ventura County, snowfall averages five inches or more per year, and along the northern border and Mount Pinos, more than twenty inches.

==== Air quality ====
Automobile emissions account for most of the air pollution. Other sources include chemical plants, gasoline stations, paint and cleaning products.

=== Adjacent counties ===
- Santa Barbara County — Northwest
- Kern County — North
- Los Angeles County — Southeast

=== National protected areas ===
- Angeles National Forest (part)
- Channel Islands National Park (part)
- Hopper Mountain National Wildlife Refuge
- Los Padres National Forest (part)
- Santa Monica Mountains National Recreation Area (part)
- Dick Smith Wilderness (part)

=== Rivers ===
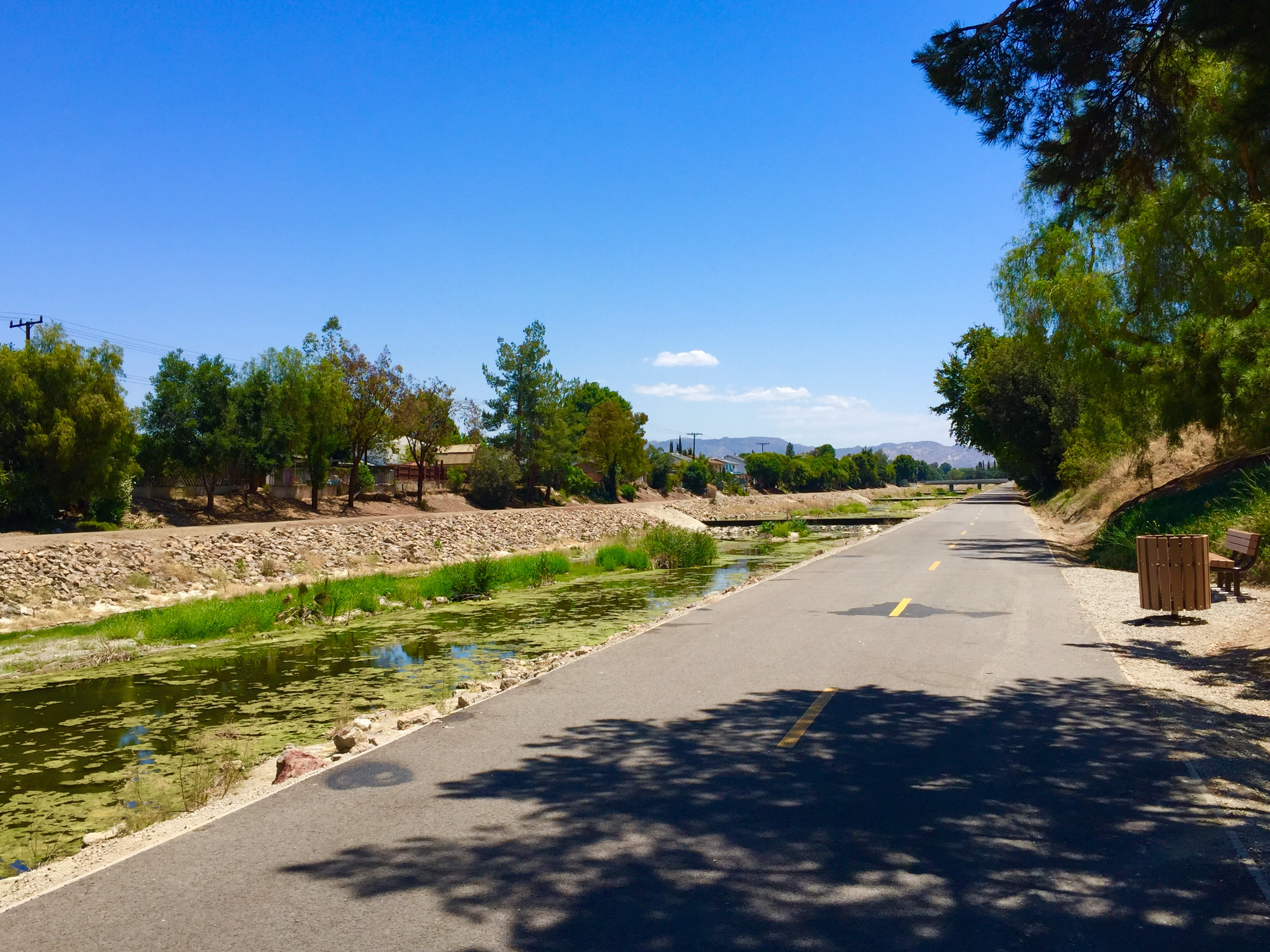
Walkway by Arroyo Simi in Simi Valley

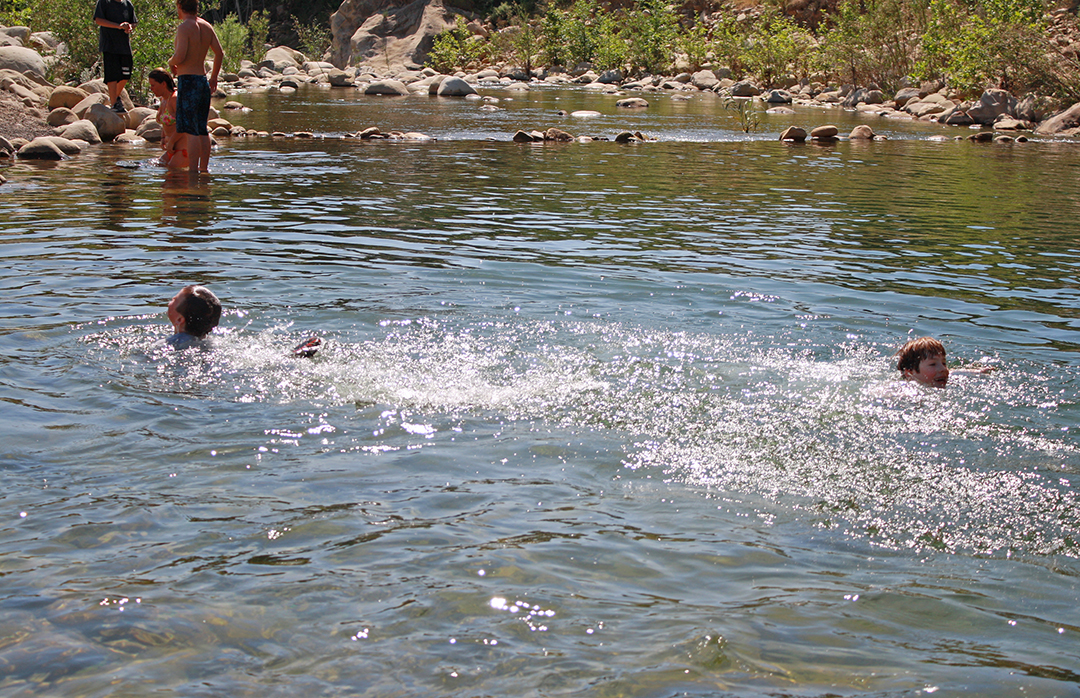
Swimming hole in the Ventura River

Rivers in Ventura County include:

- Los Sauces Creek
- Madrianio Creek
- Padre Juan Canyon
- Ventura River
  - Manuel Canyon
  - Cañada Larga
  - Cañada de Alisos
  - Coyote Creek
    - Lake Casitas
      - Laguna Creek
      - Willow Creek
      - Santa Ana Creek
        - Roble-Casitas Canal
      - Poplin Creek
    - Deep Cat Lake
    - East Fork Coyote Creek
    - West Fork Coyote Creek
  - Matilija Creek
    - Rattlesnake Creek
    - Lime Creek
    - Murietta Creek
    - Middle Fork Matilija Creek
    - Upper North Fork Matilija Creek
  - North Fork Matilija Creek (This and Matilija Creek form the Ventura River's headwaters.)
- Santa Clara River
  - Sespe Creek
  - Piru Creek
  - Castaic Creek
- Calleguas Creek
  - Arroyo Simi
  - Arroyo Conejo

== Demographics ==
Historical population
Census	Pop.	Note	%±
1880	5,073		—
1890	10,071		98.5%
1900	14,367		42.7%
1910	18,347		27.7%
1920	28,724		56.6%
1930	54,976		91.4%
1940	69,685		26.8%
1950	114,647		64.5%
1960	199,138		73.7%
1970	376,430		89.0%
1980	529,174		40.6%
1990	669,016		26.4%
2000	753,197		12.6%
2010	823,318		9.3%
2020	843,843		2.5%
2025 (est.)	830,851	▼	−1.5%
U.S. Decennial Census; 1790–1960 1900–1990; 1990–2000 2010 2020

=== 2020 census ===
As of the 2020 census, the county had a population of 843,843. The median age was 39.5 years, 22.2% of residents were under the age of 18, and 16.9% of residents were 65 years of age or older. For every 100 females there were 96.5 males, and for every 100 females age 18 and over there were 94.6 males age 18 and over.

The racial makeup of the county was 50.8% White, 1.8% Black or African American, 1.7% American Indian and Alaska Native, 7.7% Asian, 0.2% Native Hawaiian and Pacific Islander, 20.6% from some other race, and 17.2% from two or more races. Hispanic or Latino residents of any race comprised 43.3% of the population.

96.6% of residents lived in urban areas, while 3.4% lived in rural areas.

There were 279,715 households in the county, of which 34.9% had children under the age of 18 living with them and 24.6% had a female householder with no spouse or partner present. About 20.3% of all households were made up of individuals and 10.4% had someone living alone who was 65 years of age or older.

There were 293,080 housing units, of which 4.6% were vacant. Among occupied housing units, 63.3% were owner-occupied and 36.7% were renter-occupied. The homeowner vacancy rate was 0.7% and the rental vacancy rate was 4.0%.

=== Racial and ethnic composition ===
Ventura County, California – Racial and ethnic composition Note: the US Census treats Hispanic/Latino as an ethnic category. This table excludes Latinos from the racial categories and assigns them to a separate category. Hispanics/Latinos may be of any race.
Race / Ethnicity (NH = Non-Hispanic)	Pop 1980	Pop 1990	Pop 2000	Pop 2010	Pop 2020	% 1980	% 1990	% 2000	% 2010	% 2020
White alone (NH)	383,064	440,555	427,449	400,868	360,850	72.39%	65.85%	56.75%	48.69%	42.76%
Black or African American alone (NH)	10,832	14,559	13,490	13,082	13,704	2.05%	2.18%	1.79%	1.59%	1.62%
Native American or Alaska Native alone (NH)	4,899	3,430	3,177	2,389	2,020	0.93%	0.51%	0.42%	0.29%	0.24%
Asian alone (NH)	15,994	32,665	39,452	54,099	63,252	3.02%	4.88%	5.24%	6.57%	7.50%
Native Hawaiian or Pacific Islander alone (NH)	x	x	1,379	1,353	1,415	x	x	0.18%	0.16%	0.17%
Other race alone (NH)	1,193	855	1,122	1,371	4,451	0.23%	0.13%	0.15%	0.17%	0.53%
Mixed race or Multiracial (NH)	x	x	15,394	18,589	32,866	x	x	2.04%	2.26%	3.89%
Hispanic or Latino (any race)	113,192	176,952	251,734	331,567	365,285	21.39%	26.45%	33.42%	40.27%	43.29%
Total	529,174	669,016	753,197	823,318	843,843	100.00%	100.00%	100.00%	100.00%	100.00%

=== American Community Survey 2025 data ===
The United States Census Bureau estimated that in 2025, Ventura County’s population was 830.851. It was also estimated that the county's population was 40,64% Non-Hispanic White, 45,62% Hispanic or Latino, 1,76% Non-Hispanic Black, 8,15% Asian, 0,24% Native American, 0,17% Pacific Islander, and 3,41% Multiracial.

Total	Population	Percentage
Non-Hispanic White	337.678	40,64%
Hispanic or Latino	379.029	45,62%
Non-Hispanic Black	14.658	1,76%
Asian	67.742	8,15%
Native American	2.034	0,24%
Pacific Islander	1.394	0,17%
Non-Hispanic Multiracial	28.316	3,41%

=== 2010 ===
The 2010 United States census reported that Ventura County had a population of 823,318. The racial makeup of Ventura County was 565,804 (68.7%) White, 15,163 (1.8%) African American, 8,068 (1.0%) Native American, 55,446 (6.7%) Asian, 1,643 (0.2%) Pacific Islander, 140,253 (17.0%) from other races, and 36,941 (4.5%) from two or more races. Hispanic or Latino of any race were 331,567 persons (40.3%).

Population reported at 2010 United States census
The County	Total; Population	White	African; American	Native; American	Asian	Pacific; Islander	other races	two or more races	Hispanic or Latino (of any race)
Ventura County	823,318	565,804	15,163	8,068	55,446	1,643	140,253	36,941	331,567
Incorporated cities and towns	Total; Population	White	African; American	Native; American	Asian	Pacific; Islander	other races	two or more races	Hispanic or Latino (of any race)
Camarillo	65,201	48,947	1,216	397	6,633	116	4,774	3,118	14,958
Fillmore	15,002	8,581	75	180	155	12	5,204	795	11,212
Moorpark	34,421	25,860	533	248	2,352	50	3,727	1,651	10,813
Ojai	7,461	6,555	42	47	158	1	440	218	1,339
Oxnard	197,899	95,346	5,771	2,953	14,550	658	69,527	9,094	145,551
Port Hueneme	21,723	12,357	1,111	295	1,299	119	5,224	1,318	11,360
Santa Paula	29,321	18,458	152	460	216	24	8,924	1,087	23,299
Simi Valley	124,237	93,597	1,739	761	11,555	178	10,685	5,722	28,938
Thousand Oaks	126,683	101,702	1,674	497	11,043	146	6,869	4,752	21,341
Ventura	106,433	81,553	1,724	1,287	3,663	206	12,486	5,514	33,874
Census-designated places	Total; Population	White	African; American	Native; American	Asian	Pacific; Islander	other races	two or more races	Hispanic or Latino (of any race)
Bell Canyon	2,049	1,724	58	4	179	0	10	74	103
Casa Conejo	3,249	2,560	27	20	160	4	327	151	851
Channel Islands Beach	3,103	2,712	27	16	108	6	103	131	402
El Rio	7,198	3,495	58	201	73	24	3,027	320	6,188
Lake Sherwood	1,527	1,368	5	1	101	0	9	43	52
Meiners Oaks	3,571	2,789	14	58	51	1	549	109	1,068
Mira Monte	6,854	5,989	43	61	129	3	406	223	1,254
Oak Park	13,811	11,473	141	32	1,556	9	162	438	826
Oak View	4,066	3,227	11	63	34	3	575	153	1,217
Piru	2,063	1,063	16	43	11	0	830	100	1,748
Santa Rosa Valley	3,334	2,904	23	13	187	4	102	101	353
Santa Susana	1,037	904	17	2	23	0	33	58	156
Saticoy	1,029	413	9	29	2	0	508	68	895
Other unincorporated areas	Total; Population	White	African; American	Native; American	Asian	Pacific; Islander	other races	two or more races	Hispanic or Latino (of any race)
All others not CDPs (combined)	42,046	32,227	677	400	1,208	79	5,752	1,703	13,769

=== 2000 ===
As of the census of 2000, there were 753,197 people, 243,234 households, and 182,911 families living in the county. The population density was 408 inhabitants per square mile (158/km^{2}). There were 251,712 housing units at an average density of 136 per square mile (53/km^{2}). The racial makeup of the county was 69.9% White, 5.4% Asian, 2.0% Black or African American, 0.9% Native American, 0.2% Pacific Islander, 17.7% from other races, and 3.9% from two or more races. About one third (33.4%) of the population is Hispanic or Latino of any race. 9.8% were of German, 7.7% English and 7.1% Irish ancestry according to Census 2000. 67.1% spoke only English at home, while 26.2% spoke Spanish and 1.5% Tagalog.

There were 243,234 households, of which 39.7% had children under the age of 18 living with them, 59.5% were married couples living together, 10.9% had a female householder with no husband present, and 24.8% were non-families. 18.9% of all households were made up of individuals, and 7.4% had someone living alone who was 65 years of age or older. The average household size was 3.04 and the average family size was 3.46.

In the county, 28.4% of the population was under the age of 18, 9.0% was from 18 to 24, 30.7% from 25 to 44, 21.7% from 45 to 64, and 10.2% was 65 or older. The median age was 34 years. For every 100 females, there were 99.7 males. For every 100 females age 18 and over, there were 97.5 males.

The median income for a household in the county was $59,666, and the median income for a family was $65,285. Males had a median income of $45,310, versus $32,216 for females. The per capita income for the county was $24,600. About 6.4% of families and 9.2% of the population were below the poverty line, including 11.6% of those under age 18 and 6.3% of those aged 65 or over.

According to an updated 2005 US Census, Ventura County's median household income was $66,859, while the mean was $85,032. Per capita income was $29,634, making it the sixth wealthiest county in California.

=== Housing ===
Ventura County typically has limited housing inventory, making it a consistently expensive location in Southern California, where it is usually the third-most-expensive county behind Orange and Los Angeles counties. As of March 2018, the county was not on track to meet its state-mandated housing goals. Individual cities are responsible for meeting their assigned housing goals, while the county government is responsible for housing goals in unincorporated areas. Several affordable housing groups that are actively working on building housing for veterans and low income people have long waiting lists. Farmworker housing also has waiting lists though designated units continue to be built.

=== Metropolitan Statistical Area ===
The United States Office of Management and Budget has designated Ventura County as the Oxnard–Thousand Oaks–Ventura, CA Metropolitan Statistical Area. The United States Census Bureau ranked the Oxnard–Thousand Oaks–Ventura, CA Metropolitan Statistical Area as the 66th most populous metropolitan statistical area of the United States as of July 1, 2012.

The Office of Management and Budget has further designated the Oxnard–Thousand Oaks–Ventura, CA Metropolitan Statistical Area as a component of the more extensive Los Angeles–Long Beach, CA Combined Statistical Area, the second most populous combined statistical area and primary statistical area of the United States as of July 1, 2012.

== Economy ==
In 2019, the county faced a weak economic outlook due to the declining housing affordability and lack of job growth.

=== Agriculture ===
Lemons are the number two crop in the county according to the 2018 crop and livestock report. The economic value of lemons is more than $244 million a year, Valencia oranges are nearly $20 million a year, and mandarins/tangelos are more than $17 million a year.

The county became a major producer in the state for hemp after it was removed from a list of controlled substances along with other provisions of the Hemp Farming Act of 2018. These provisions were included in the 2018 Farm Bill which made hemp legal for agricultural uses. The agricultural commissioner enforces state rules regarding testing of the plants, varieties that can be grown and registration of acreage. By October 2019, close to 4,100 acres (1,700 ha) for cultivation and seed breeding have been registered in the county. The annual crop report had 3,470 harvestable acres for 2019 with an estimated gross value $35.5 million.

Several cities within the county are banning or have a moratorium on the planting, harvesting, drying, processing and manufacture of hemp products. These city councils were reacting to complaints about the smell. With some fields in unincorporated area being near residences, homeowners also brought their concerns to the county board of supervisors. The acreage available for planting was reduced when a buffer zone was established around schools and residential communities in 2020.

=== Cannabis ===
State law says local governments may not prohibit adults from growing, using or transporting marijuana for personal use but they can prohibit companies from growing, testing, and selling cannabis within their jurisdiction by licensing none or only some of these activities. The state allows deliveries without local agency licensing at the point of delivery.

Under the legalization of the sale and distribution of cannabis in California, Ventura County voters approved Measure O in 2020, which sets up taxes on marijuana cultivation, as well as limits on the amounts of growing. Allowing retail sales to the general public in the unincorporated areas was not approved as part of the referendum although sales are allowed within the cities of Port Hueneme and Ojai. It restricted operations to the inside of existing greenhouses with only 500 acres (200 ha) of commercial cannabis allowed within the county, though an additional 100 acres (40 ha) is available for nursery cultivation.

A 5.5-million-square-foot (0.51-million-square-metre) greenhouse facility, on which construction had begun in 1996 to grow tomatoes and other produce, began preparing to grow cannabis in 2021 under the rules put in place by Measure O.

=== Technology ===
Amgen, the Thousand Oaks-based biotechnology giant, is the biggest publicly-traded company in Ventura County by market capitalization. The Trade Desk, the Ventura-based industry leader in advertising on streaming services, is second.

== Arts and culture ==
Albinger Archaeological Museum is located at 113 E Main St, Ventura, next to Mission San Buenaventura. It was once the home to 5 different cultures spanning 3,500 years of history including the Chumash Indians, Chinese immigrants and others.

Channel Islands Maritime Museum preserves maritime heritage, maritime arts and culture, while highlighting the ecology of The Ocean. It is located at the Channel Islands Harbor at 3900 Bluefin Circle, Oxnard.

The Chumash Indian Museum, in Thousand Oaks, is dedicated to restoring and preserving an awareness of the Chumash people and their history, culture, present-day influence and the historical significance of this site.

Museum of Ventura County located at 100 East Main St, Ventura, promotes interest in and understanding of the history and art of the Ventura County region.

The Santa Paula Art Museum occupies two historic buildings in Santa Paula. The Santa Paula Art Museum's Jeanette Cole Art Center 117 N 10th St, is the primary exhibition space in the Limoneira building. The Santa Paula Art Museum's Cole Creativity Center, 123 N 10th St, has art classes and special programs.

== Sports ==
Ventura County has one professional sports franchise, Ventura County FC, who play in MLS Next Pro. The club plays home matches at California Lutheran University in Thousand Oaks and are currently affiliated with LA Galaxy of Major League Soccer. The city of Ventura is home to a pre-professional USL League Two soccer club, Ventura County Fusion.

The Conejo Oaks are a collegiate summer baseball team who are members of the California Collegiate League and currently play home games at Ventura College.

The USHL, the top junior ice hockey league in the United States, is currently exploring placing a franchise in Simi Valley as part of a West Coast expansion.

== Government and policing ==
=== Administration ===
Ventura County operates as a general law county under the California Constitution and law. It does not have a county charter.

The county is governed by a five-member Board of Supervisors. Supervisors are elected by districts for four-year terms, with no term limits in effect. The chairman and vice-chairman are elected by annually by the Board of Supervisors from among its members. They appoint the county executive officer who appoints non-elected department administrators who manage county functions. The county seal, that was adopted in 1964, was reviewed in 2022 due to prominent depiction of Junípero Serra that could be hurtful to those who allege that Serra was responsible for the suppression of the culture of Chumash people. The seal also had images referring to atomic energy and oil drilling that no longer represented the county industries. A new seal was adopted that depicts Arch Rock off Anacapa Island.

As of 2023, the county supervisors are Matt LaVere (District 1), Jeff Gorell (District 2), Kelly Long (District 3), Janice Parvin (District 4), and Vianey Lopez (District 5). Dr. Sevet Johnson is the County Executive Officer. James Fryhoff is the sheriff of the Ventura County Sheriff's Department. Dustin Gardner is the chief of the Ventura County Fire Department.

=== Federal and state representation ===
Much of the county, including the cities of Thousand Oaks, Oxnard and Moorpark, lie within the 26th congressional district, which is represented by Democrat Julia Brownley. Other parts of the county are in California's 24th congressional district, represented by Democrat Salud Carbajal, California's 25th congressional district, represented by Democrat Raul Ruiz, and California's 30th congressional district, represented by Democrat Laura Friedman. For the previous twenty five years, most of Ventura County was represented by Elton Gallegly, a conservative Republican from Simi Valley, who retired in 2012.

In the California State Senate, Ventura County is split between the 19th senatorial district, represented by Republican Rosilicie Ochoa Bogh, and the 27th senatorial district, represented by Democrat Henry Stern.

In the California State Assembly, Ventura County is split between four legislative districts:

- the 37th Assembly district, represented by Democrat Gregg Hart,
- the 38th Assembly district, represented by Democrat Steve Bennett,
- the 44th Assembly district, represented by Democrat Nick Schultz, and
- the 45th Assembly district, represented by Democrat James Ramos

=== Law enforcement ===
The Ventura County Sheriff's Department provides court protection, county jail administration, and patrol for the unincorporated areas of the county plus contracted police services for the incorporated cities of Thousand Oaks, Fillmore, Camarillo, Moorpark, and Ojai.

The incorporated cities of Ventura, Oxnard, Simi Valley, Port Hueneme, and Santa Paula have municipal police departments.

==== Crime ====
Ventura County is home to several of the safest communities in the U.S., including Thousand Oaks, Simi Valley, Newbury Park, and Moorpark. Overall, crime in the county is 33% lower than California and U.S. rates.

According to a 2019 report, the county is the second safest county among California's most populated counties.

The following table includes the number of incidents reported and the rate per 1,000 persons for each type of offense.

Population and crime rates
Population	815,745	
Violent crime	2,021	2.48
Homicide	29	0.04
Forcible rape	116	0.14
Robbery	757	0.93
Aggravated assault	1,119	1.37
Property crime	7,696	9.43
Burglary	2,954	3.62
Larceny-theft (Note: Only larceny-theft cases involving property over $400 in value are reported as property crimes.)	11,221	13.76
Motor vehicle theft	1,154	1.41
Arson	113	0.14

==== Cities by population and crime rates ====
Cities by population and crime rates
City	Population	Violent crimes	Violent crime rate per 1,000 persons	Property crimes	Property crime rate per 1,000 persons
Camarillo	66,506	61	0.92	955	14.36
Fillmore	15,298	24	1.57	198	12.94
Moorpark	35,102	41	1.17	330	9.40
Ojai	7,607	13	1.71	162	21.30
Oxnard	201,797	603	2.99	4,071	20.17
Port Hueneme	22,142	65	2.94	467	21.09
Santa Paula	29,899	91	3.04	590	19.73
Simi Valley	126,686	141	1.11	1,916	15.12
Thousand Oaks	129,171	157	1.22	1,838	14.23
Ventura	108,511	310	2.86	3,885	35.80

=== 2040 General Plan ===
In 2020, the County of Ventura updated its general plan to the Ventura County 2040 General Plan, as mandated by the California Office of Planning and Research. This document establishes guidelines and a regulatory basis for development and policy-making in the county until it is updated again in 2040. The County held surveys, workshops, advisory committees, and hearings to encourage community participation in the process of shaping and adopting the Ventura County 2040 General Plan. The final 2040 General Plan, adopted on September 15, 2020, by the Ventura County Board of Supervisors, is centered on the following nine elements of governance:

- Land Use and Community Character
- Housing
- Circulation, Transportation, and Mobility
- Public Facilities, Services, and Infrastructure
- Conservation and Open Space
- Hazards and Safety
- Agriculture
- Water Resources
- Economic Vitality.

The Environmental Impact Review done by the state on the Ventura County 2040 General Plan Update, as required by the California Environmental Quality Act, projects that the county will see a population increase of 13% from 2018 to 2040. As such, the review found no significant population or housing need changes anticipated for the county during this period.

A 2020 lawsuit filed against the county by The Ventura County Coalition of Labor, Agriculture and Business and the Ventura County Agricultural Association opposed policies in the 2040 General Plan which restricted oil and gas development, raised costs of agriculture, set high housing quality standards, and limited brush clearance. The suit was settled in February 2023 with the county's adoption of an Implementation Clarification for Certain Policies and Programs Contained in the 2040 General Plan, which stated the county's ongoing support of agricultural operations without altering the content of the Plan.

== Politics ==
United States presidential election results for Ventura County, California (Note: This total comprised 2,055 votes for Progressive Theodore Roosevelt (who was official Republican nominee in California), 426 votes for Socialist Eugene V. Debs and 169 votes for Prohibition Party nominee Eugene W. Chafin.)
Year	Republican		Democratic		Third party(ies)	
Year	No.	%	No.	%	No.	%
1880	599	53.24%	522	46.40%	4	0.36%
1884	749	53.96%	603	43.44%	36	2.59%
1888	1,107	53.84%	906	44.07%	43	2.09%
1892	1,283	46.60%	958	34.80%	512	18.60%
1896	1,553	50.41%	1,465	47.55%	63	2.04%
1900	1,708	53.54%	1,333	41.79%	149	4.67%
1904	1,995	63.86%	840	26.89%	289	9.25%
1908	1,864	56.57%	1,181	35.84%	250	7.59%
1912	71	1.47%	2,108	43.62%	2,654	54.91%
1916	3,980	55.18%	2,835	39.30%	398	5.52%
1920	5,231	76.00%	1,305	18.96%	347	5.04%
1924	5,705	65.16%	911	10.41%	2,139	24.43%
1928	9,017	70.17%	3,717	28.92%	117	0.91%
1932	6,908	37.27%	10,903	58.82%	724	3.91%
1936	7,579	35.75%	13,384	63.14%	235	1.11%
1940	11,225	42.15%	15,182	57.00%	227	0.85%
1944	11,071	40.19%	16,342	59.33%	131	0.48%
1948	13,930	42.15%	18,100	54.77%	1,019	3.08%
1952	24,534	52.47%	21,967	46.98%	256	0.55%
1956	26,342	49.92%	26,276	49.80%	149	0.28%
1960	35,074	49.59%	35,334	49.96%	315	0.45%
1964	40,264	40.99%	57,805	58.84%	169	0.17%
1968	59,705	51.35%	47,794	41.11%	8,762	7.54%
1972	95,310	63.20%	49,307	32.70%	6,188	4.10%
1976	82,670	53.20%	68,529	44.10%	4,201	2.70%
1980	114,930	60.28%	56,311	29.54%	19,409	10.18%
1984	151,383	68.67%	66,550	30.19%	2,529	1.15%
1988	147,604	61.64%	89,065	37.19%	2,804	1.17%
1992	94,911	35.46%	99,011	36.99%	73,725	27.55%
1996	109,202	43.47%	110,772	44.10%	31,220	12.43%
2000	136,173	48.17%	133,258	47.14%	13,261	4.69%
2004	160,314	51.19%	148,859	47.53%	4,020	1.28%
2008	145,853	42.77%	187,601	55.01%	7,587	2.22%
2012	147,958	45.15%	170,929	52.16%	8,825	2.69%
2016	132,323	37.16%	194,402	54.59%	29,382	8.25%
2020	162,207	38.36%	251,388	59.45%	9,230	2.18%
2024	158,901	40.99%	217,424	56.08%	11,379	2.93%

For many years, Ventura County voted consistently for Republican candidates for local, statewide and federal offices. Only recently has the county begun favoring Democratic candidates in both federal and state elections. While Republicans used to win a large majority of votes throughout the 1970s and 1980s, no party received greater than 55% of the county's vote from 1992 to 2016. Prior to Barack Obama's victory in the county in 2008, the last Democrat to win a majority was Lyndon Johnson in 1964, though Democrat Bill Clinton carried the county by a plurality in both of his victories in 1992 and 1996.

On March 3, 2008, Democratic registration surpassed Republican registration and the former's edge has grown since. The cities of Camarillo, Moorpark, Simi Valley, and Thousand Oaks all have voter rolls with Republican pluralities. The remaining cities and towns in the county have a Democratic plurality or majority on the voter rolls, while the unincorporated areas are split almost evenly between the two major parties.

Gubernatorial elections results

Gubernatorial elections results
Year	Republican	Democratic
2022	45.5% 127,709	54.5% 153,226
2018	44.4% 137,393	55.6% 171,729
2014	46.9% 93,797	53.1% 106,072
2010	49.3% 128,082	45.3% 117,800
2006	61.0% 134,862	34.3% 75,790
2002	47.2% 91,193	43.2% 83,557
1998	43.8% 91,093	53.0% 110,226
1994	62.4% 136,417	33.4% 73,163
1990	57.6% 106,234	36.9% 68,139
1986	67.2% 118,640	31.1% 54,893
1982	55.2% 99,130	42.4% 76,094
1978	40.6% 57,777	52.8% 75,173
1974	50.5% 60,122	47.2% 56,189
1970	58.6% 63,790	38.9% 42,350
1966	60.9% 58,068	39.1% 37,224
1962	45.2% 31,899	53.5% 37,777

=== Voter registration statistics (2013) ===
Population and registered voters
Total population	815,745	
Registered voters (Note: Percentage of registered voters with respect to total population. Percentages of party members with respect to registered voters follow.)	431,154	52.9%
Democratic	166,462	38.6%
Republican	155,180	36.0%
Democratic–Republican spread	+11,282	+2.6%
American Independent	11,072	2.6%
Green	2,324	0.5%
Libertarian	2,700	0.6%
Peace and Freedom	926	0.2%
Americans Elect	13	0.0%
Other	5,733	1.3%
No party preference	86,744	20.1%

==== Cities by population and voter registration ====
Cities by population and voter registration
City	Population	Registered voters	Democratic	Republican	D–R spread	Other	No party preference
Camarillo	64,340	63.2%	33.1%	43.2%	-10.1%	7.8%	18.6%
Fillmore	14,863	42.7%	47.0%	27.8%	+19.2%	7.7%	20.0%
Moorpark	34,100	58.6%	33.8%	40.8%	-7.0%	7.8%	20.2%
Ojai	7,496	65.9%	46.0%	27.3%	+18.7%	9.1%	20.2%
Oxnard	194,972	36.4%	51.6%	22.5%	+29.1%	6.4%	21.5%
Port Hueneme	21,717	40.4%	47.5%	25.2%	+22.3%	8.1%	21.8%
San Buenaventura (Ventura)	105,809	61.1%	42.4%	32.3%	+10.1%	8.5%	19.4%
Santa Paula	29,248	39.8%	53.4%	23.7%	+29.7%	6.6%	18.5%
Simi Valley	122,864	57.8%	30.3%	44.7%	-14.4%	8.2%	19.6%
Thousand Oaks	125,633	62.4%	31.9%	41.8%	-9.9%	8.0%	21.0%

== Education ==
=== K-12 education ===
School districts include:

Unified:

- Conejo Valley Unified School District
- Cuyama Joint Unified School District
- El Tejon Unified School District
- Fillmore Unified School District
- Las Virgenes Unified School District
- Moorpark Unified School District
- Oak Park Unified School District
- Ojai Unified School District
- Santa Paula Unified School District - Includes some areas for PK–12 and some for 9–12 only
- Simi Valley Unified School District
- Ventura Unified School District

Secondary:

- Oxnard Union High School District

Elementary:

- Briggs Elementary School District
- Hueneme Elementary School District
- Mesa Union Elementary School District
- Mupu Elementary School District
- Ocean View Elementary School District
- Oxnard Elementary School District
- Pleasant Valley Elementary School District
- Rio Elementary School District
- Santa Clara Elementary School District
- Somis Union Elementary School District

=== Libraries ===
==== Public libraries ====
Ventura County Library has 12 community library locations throughout the county, including three branches in the city of Ventura. Many of the other branches serve smaller towns or unincorporated communities. The county library also includes the Research Library of the Museum of Ventura County. In addition, six cities within the county operate their own city libraries that are independent of the county system: Camarillo, Moorpark, Oxnard, Santa Paula, Simi Valley, and Thousand Oaks.

==== Academic libraries ====
The colleges and universities in Ventura County support libraries to meet the research needs of their students and faculty and, in some cases, the general public. These include:

- Edward Laurence Doheny Memorial Library and Carrie Estelle Doheny Memorial Library, St. John's Seminary (Camarillo)
- Evelyn and Howard Boroughs Library, Ventura College
- John Spoor Broome Library, California State University Channel Islands (Camarillo)
- Moorpark College Library
- Oxnard College Library
- Pearson Library, California Lutheran University (Thousand Oaks)
- St. Bernardine of Siena Library, Thomas Aquinas College (Santa Paula)

==== Other libraries ====
The Ronald Reagan Presidential Library is located in Simi Valley.

Ventura County Law Library, located in the Ventura County Government Center, makes current legal resources available to judges, lawyers, government officials, and other users.

== Transportation ==
=== Major highways ===
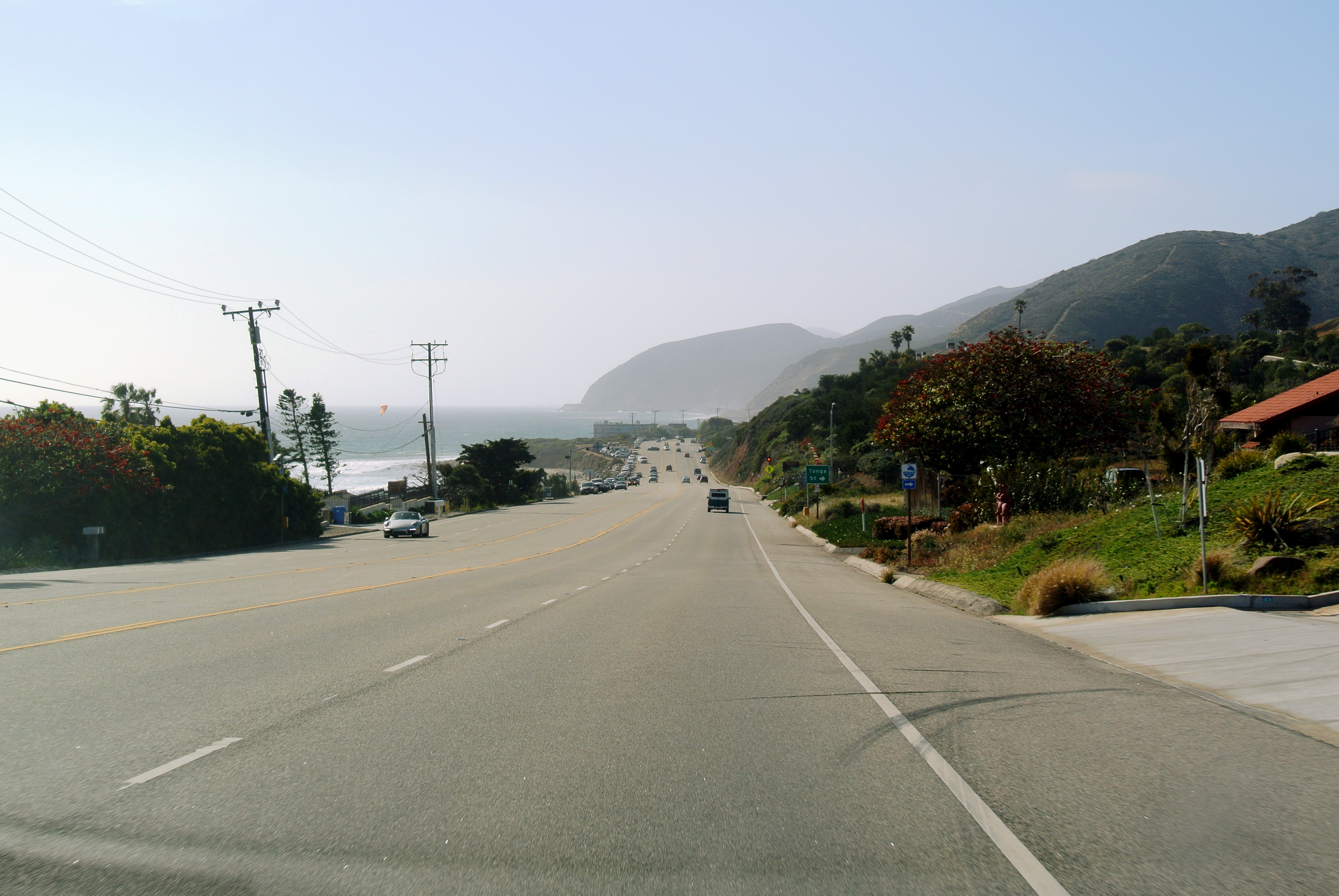
Pacific Coast Highway (CA 1) in Solromar

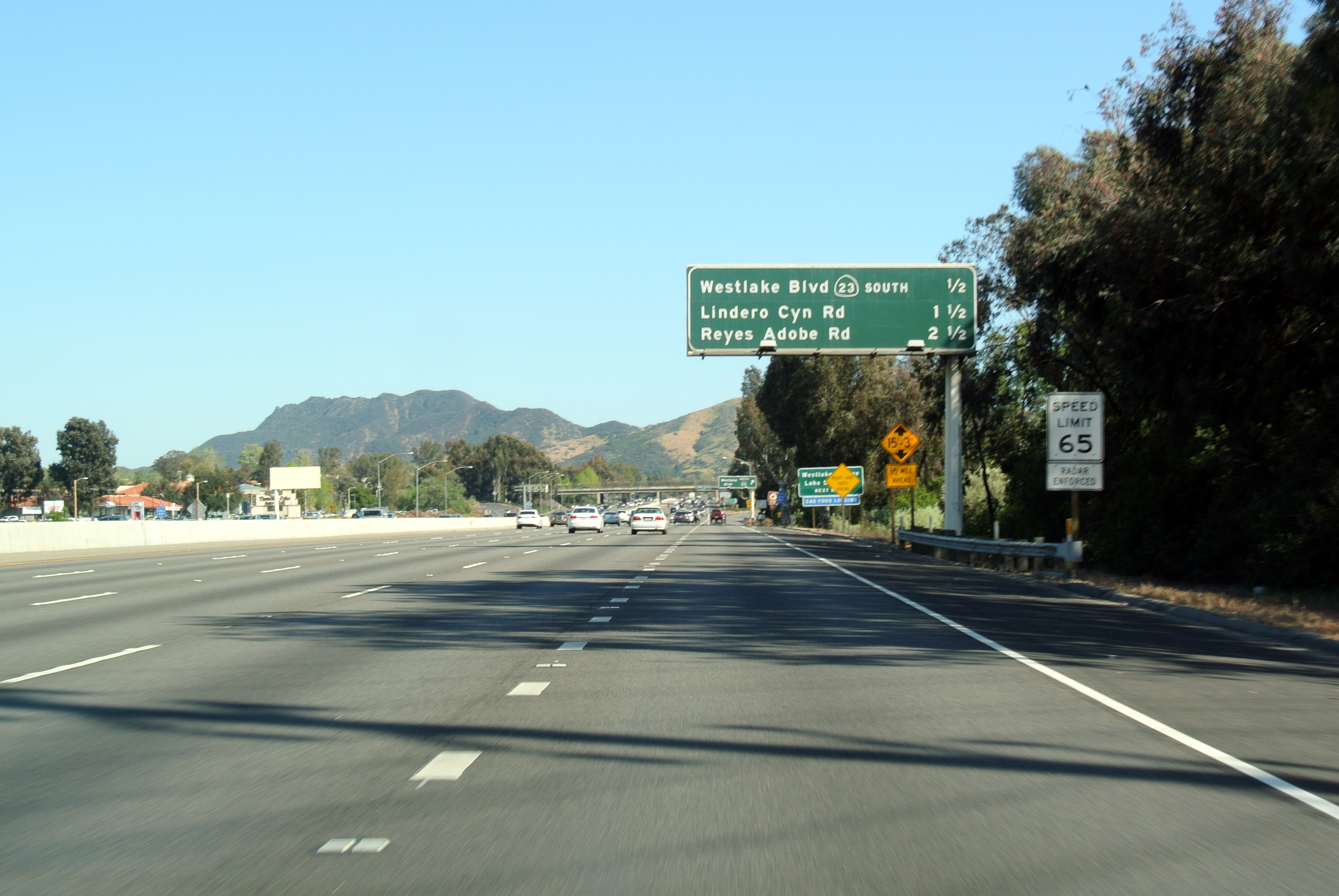
Overlap SR 23/US 101 (Ventura Freeway)

- US 101
- SR 1
- SR 23
- SR 33
- SR 34
- SR 118
- SR 126
- SR 150
- SR 232
- SR 257

=== Public transportation ===
Ventura County is served by Amtrak and Metrolink trains along the main coast rail line, as well as Greyhound Lines, Gold Coast Transit (formerly South Coast Area Transit), and VISTA buses. The county also runs the Ventura County Transportation Commission (VCTC), which operates various bus routes between cities across the county. The cities of Camarillo, Moorpark, Simi Valley and Thousand Oaks have their own small bus systems.

Park authorized commercial service operators provide access to the five islands of Channel Islands National Park.

=== Airports ===
- Oxnard Airport, just west of Downtown Oxnard and was Ventura County's only commercial airport, it now no longer takes public flights. It is also the county's largest airport.
- Camarillo Airport, formerly a US Air Force Base, is a general aviation airport located south of the City of Camarillo. It is the current base of operations of the Ventura County Sheriff's Department Aviation Unit and the home of the VCSD's Training Facility and Academy, the Ventura County Criminal Justice Training Center. The Camarillo Airport also serves as the base of operations for the Ventura County Fire Department and facilitates the Oxnard College Regional Fire Academy and the Ventura County Reserve Officers Training Center.
- Santa Paula Airport is a privately owned airport open to the public for general aviation.

== Health and animal services ==
Ventura County Animal Services (VCAS), a part of the county government, operates animal shelters in Camarillo and Simi Valley. LA County Animal Care & Control covers Thousand Oaks.

== Communities ==
=== Cities ===
- Camarillo
- Fillmore
- Moorpark
- Ojai
- Oxnard
- Port Hueneme
- Santa Paula
- Simi Valley
- Thousand Oaks
- Ventura (county seat)

=== Unincorporated communities ===
- Bardsdale
- Bell Canyon (Note: For statistical purposes, defined by the United States Census Bureau as a census-designated place (CDP).)
- Buckhorn
- Casa Conejo
- Casitas Springs
- Channel Islands Beach
- Dulah
- El Rio
- Faria
- La Conchita
- Lake Sherwood
- Lockwood Valley
- Meiners Oaks
- Mira Monte
- Mussel Shoals
- Newbury Park
- Oak Park
- Oak View
- Ortonville
- Piru
- Point Mugu
- Santa Rosa Valley
- Santa Susana
- Sea Cliff
- Silver Strand Beach
- Saticoy
- Solromar
- Somis
- Upper Ojai
- Wheeler Springs

=== Population ranking ===
The population ranking of the following table is based on the 2020 census of Ventura County.

† county seat

Rank	City/Town/etc.	Municipal type	Population (2020 Census)
1	Oxnard	City	202,736
2	Thousand Oaks	City	126,966
3	Simi Valley	City	126,356
4	† Ventura (San Buenaventura)	City	110,763
5	Camarillo	City	70,741
6	Moorpark	City	36,284
7	Santa Paula	City	30,657
8	Port Hueneme	City	21,954
9	Fillmore	City	16,419
10	Oak Park	CDP	13,898
11	Ojai	City	7,637
12	El Rio	CDP	7,037
13	Mira Monte	CDP	6,618
14	Oak View	CDP	6,215
15	Meiners Oaks	CDP	3,911
16	Santa Rosa Valley	CDP	3,312
17	Casa Conejo	CDP	3,267
18	Channel Islands Beach	CDP	2,870
19	Piru	CDP	2,587
20	Bell Canyon	CDP	1,946
21	Lake Sherwood	CDP	1,759
22	Somis	CDP	1,429
23	Santa Susana	CDP	1,160
24	Saticoy	CDP	1,133,

== In popular culture ==
Lake Sherwood is named for its use as the location for Sherwood Forest in the 1922 film Robin Hood, starring Douglas Fairbanks. The 1938 film, The Adventures of Robin Hood, starring Errol Flynn, also had a major scene shot on location at "Sherwood Forest".

On July 23, 1982, actor Vic Morrow and two child actors (My-Ca Dinh Le and Renee Shin-Ye Chen) were filming a helicopter scene for Twilight Zone: The Movie in the area of Indian Dunes in Ventura County when the helicopter lost control and crashed on top of them. Morrow and Le were decapitated and Chen was fatally crushed.

In 1963, the Korean War story The Young and the Brave, featuring a brave and resourceful young boy, was filmed in rural areas of Ventura County. Also, in 2000, the movie Swordfish filmed the final bank scene on East Main Street in Ventura. The building they used is the white building on the corner. 34.280823°N 119.294599°W

In 2009, the VH1 television show Tool Academy was filmed in Ventura County.

The movie Back to the Future Part III filmed the scene where Marty returns to the year 1985 in the time-traveling DeLorean at the railroad crossing at S Ventura Rd & Shoreview Dr in Port Hueneme.

Many films, including Little Miss Sunshine, Sideways, Chinatown, Erin Brockovich, The Aviator, and The Rock were partly filmed in Ventura.

Downtown Ventura hosts the Majestic Ventura Theater, an early 20th-century theatre which is situated about two blocks away from city hall. It is the region's most prominent local musical venue and hosts concerts regularly. The theater has hosted many internationally notable musician and bands such as Gregg Allman, John Prine, Glenn Frey, The Doors, Devo, Joe Walsh, King's X, Van Halen, X, Paramore, She Wants Revenge, Pennywise, Red Hot Chili Peppers, Snoop Dogg, Drakeo the Ruler, DJ Jazzy Jeff & The Fresh Prince, The Game, DJ Quik, Lamb of God, Social Distortion, Bad Religion, Thrice, Avenged Sevenfold, Fugazi, Incubus, Tom Petty, America, They Might Be Giants, and Modest Mouse, as well as local artists such as Army of Freshmen and Big Bad Voodoo Daddy.

== See also ==
- Los Angeles Times suburban sections
- National Register of Historic Places listings in Ventura County, California
