= Matilija Wilderness =

Protected wilderness area in California, United States

- IUCN category Ib (wilderness area)
- Location within southern California Location within California Location within the United States
- Interactive map of Matilija Wilderness
- Location: Ventura/ Santa Barbara counties, California, United States
- Nearest city: Ojai, California
- Coordinates: 34°49′0″N 119°10′0″W
- Area: 29,207 acres (118.20 km^{2})
- Established: 1992
- Governing body: U.S. Forest Service

The Matilija Wilderness is a 29,207-acre (11,820 ha) wilderness area in Ventura and Santa Barbara Counties, Southern California. It is managed by the U.S. Forest Service, being situated within the Ojai Ranger District of the Los Padres National Forest. It is located adjacent to the Dick Smith Wilderness to the northwest and the Sespe Wilderness to the northeast, although it is much smaller than either one. The Matilija Wilderness was established in 1992 in part to protect California condor habitat.

== Geography and characteristics ==
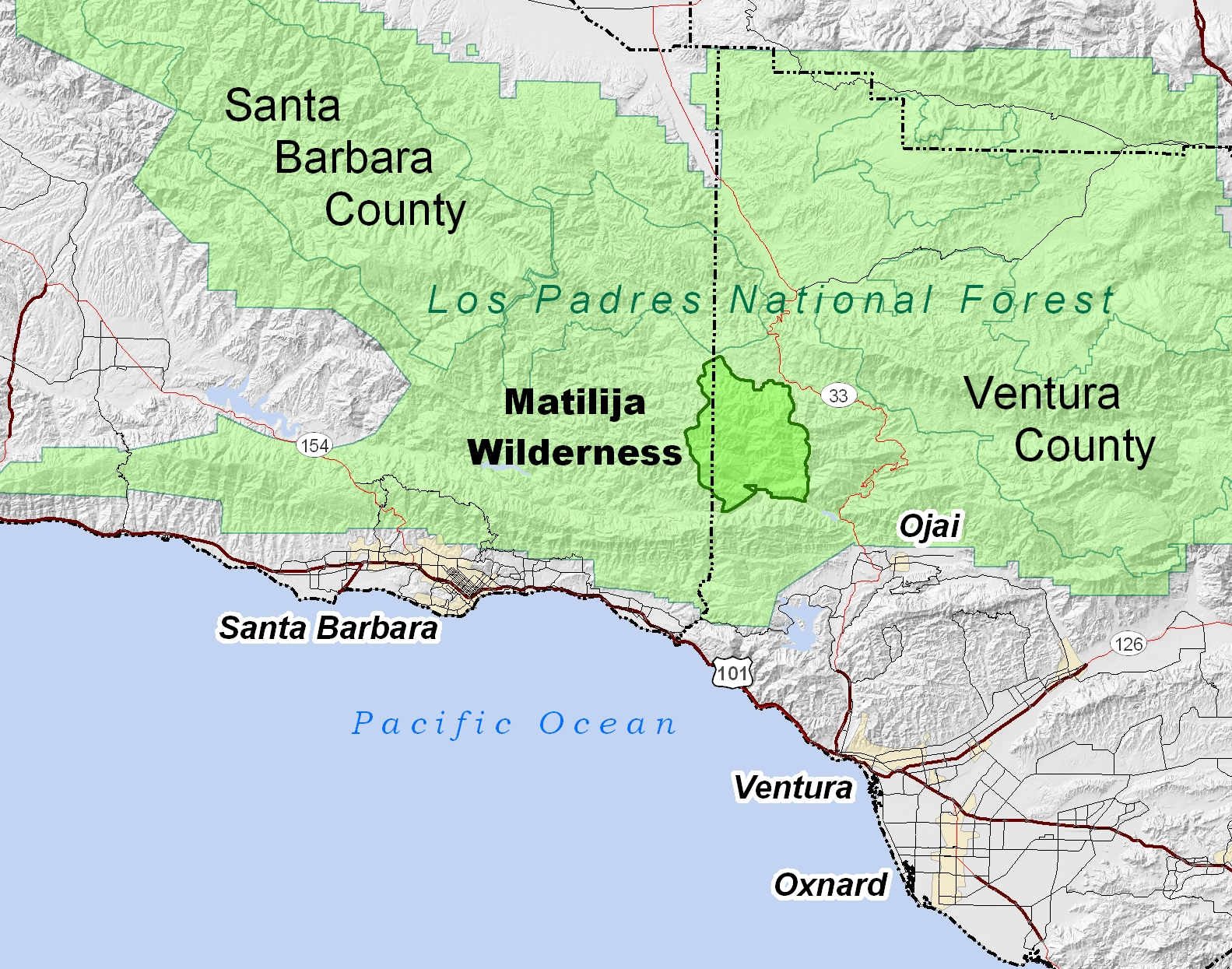
Location of Matilija Wilderness

The wilderness is located about 12 miles (19 km) northwest of Ojai in the Santa Ynez Mountains and spans most of the watershed of Matilija Creek, the main tributary of the Ventura River. Matilija Creek (sometimes known as "Middle Matilija Creek" to distinguish it from its various forks) flows from the northwest corner of the wilderness in a southeasterly direction through a deep canyon, and is joined by several major tributaries including the Upper North Fork of Matilija Creek, Old Man Canyon, and Murrieta Canyon. A small northern portion of the wilderness is drained by Sespe Creek, a tributary of the Santa Clara River.

According to the Forest Service in 2005, "the natural appearance and integrity of the area are very much intact". The area is extremely remote and rugged and is characterized by rock outcrops, crumbling slopes and steep canyons filled with brushy vegetation, with some gentler terrain in the northern part of the wilderness. Elevations range from 6,014 feet (1,833 m) at Monte Arido, on the western edge of the wilderness, to about 1,600 feet (490 m) at the Upper North Fork of Matilija Creek.

Riparian zones with thick stands of alder and maple are found along canyon bottoms, and conifers are present at higher elevations. The Matilija poppy, which has the largest flowers of any indigenous California plant, is native to this area. Wildlife found in this area include black bear, deer, mountain lions, bobcats, coyotes, foxes, quail, rabbits, raccoons and squirrels. The endangered California condor is also known to nest in the area and was a major reason for the creation of the wilderness.

== History ==
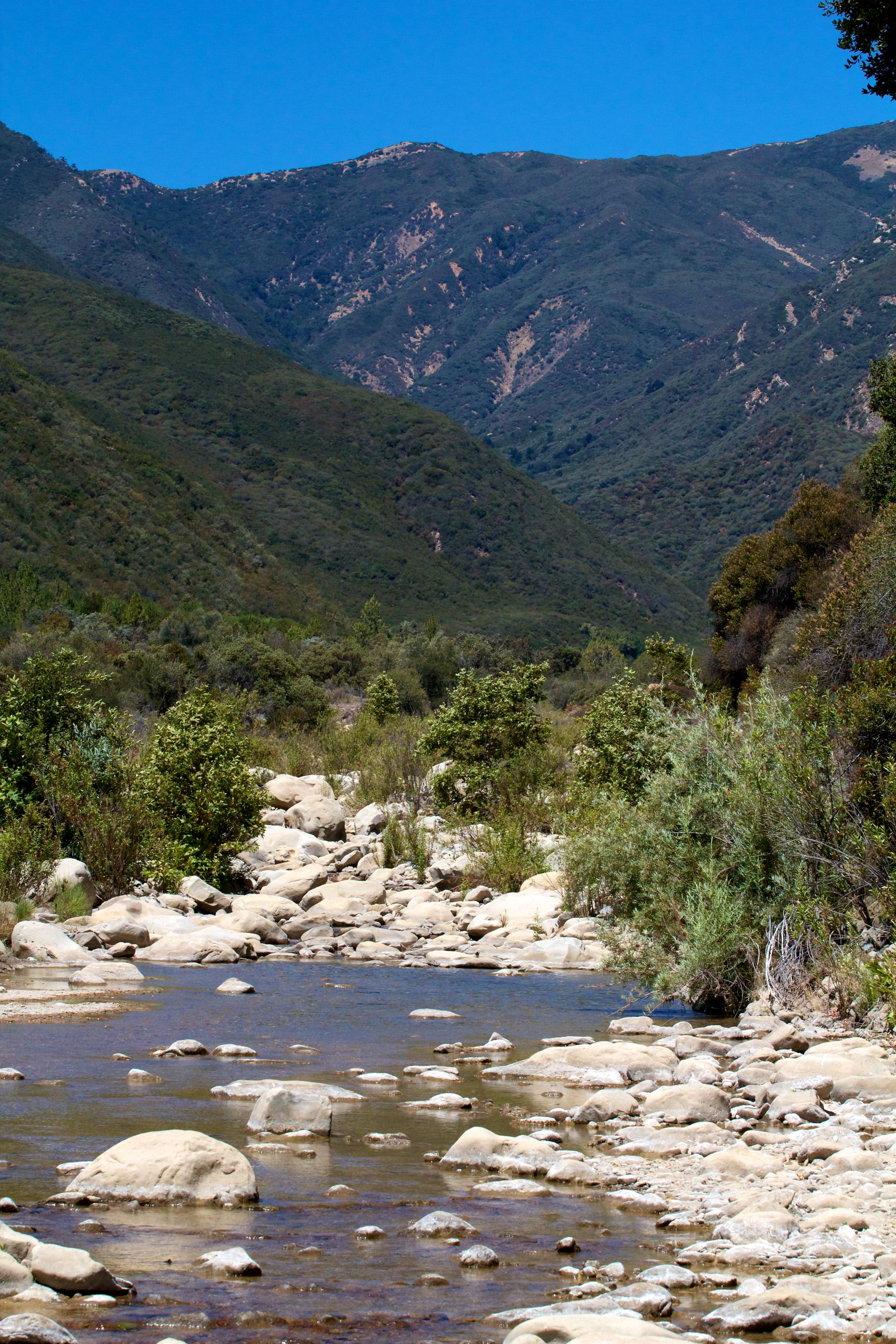
Matilija Creek in the Matilija Wilderness

The name "Matilija" is derived from "Mat'ilha", a Ventureño Chumash village once located somewhere in today's Matilija Wilderness. The Chumash collected Apocynum cannabinum (dogbane) from the canyons to use for fiber, and harvested pitch and nuts from pine trees. During the California Gold Rush Murrieta Canyon (named for legendary outlaw Joaquin Murrieta) at the southern edge of the wilderness was a trekking route for miners traveling from Santa Barbara to gold diggings on Piru Creek. The Upper North Fork of Matilija Creek, today a recreational trail, was historically a mail route between inland and coastal parts of Ventura County before the construction of Highway 33 bypassed this area.

The upper Matilija area has been a popular recreation area since the late 1800s, with many hikers making the trip up Matilija Creek to camp, fish and hunt in the canyons. The nearby Matilija Hot Springs, first discovered in 1873, became a public resort in 1877 and passed through many owners before being closed in 1988. Matilija Creek was known for its steelhead fishery until the building of Matilija Dam in 1948 closed off the upper section of the creek, within today's wilderness area, to fish migration. The dam is now filled with sediment and it is being considered for removal.

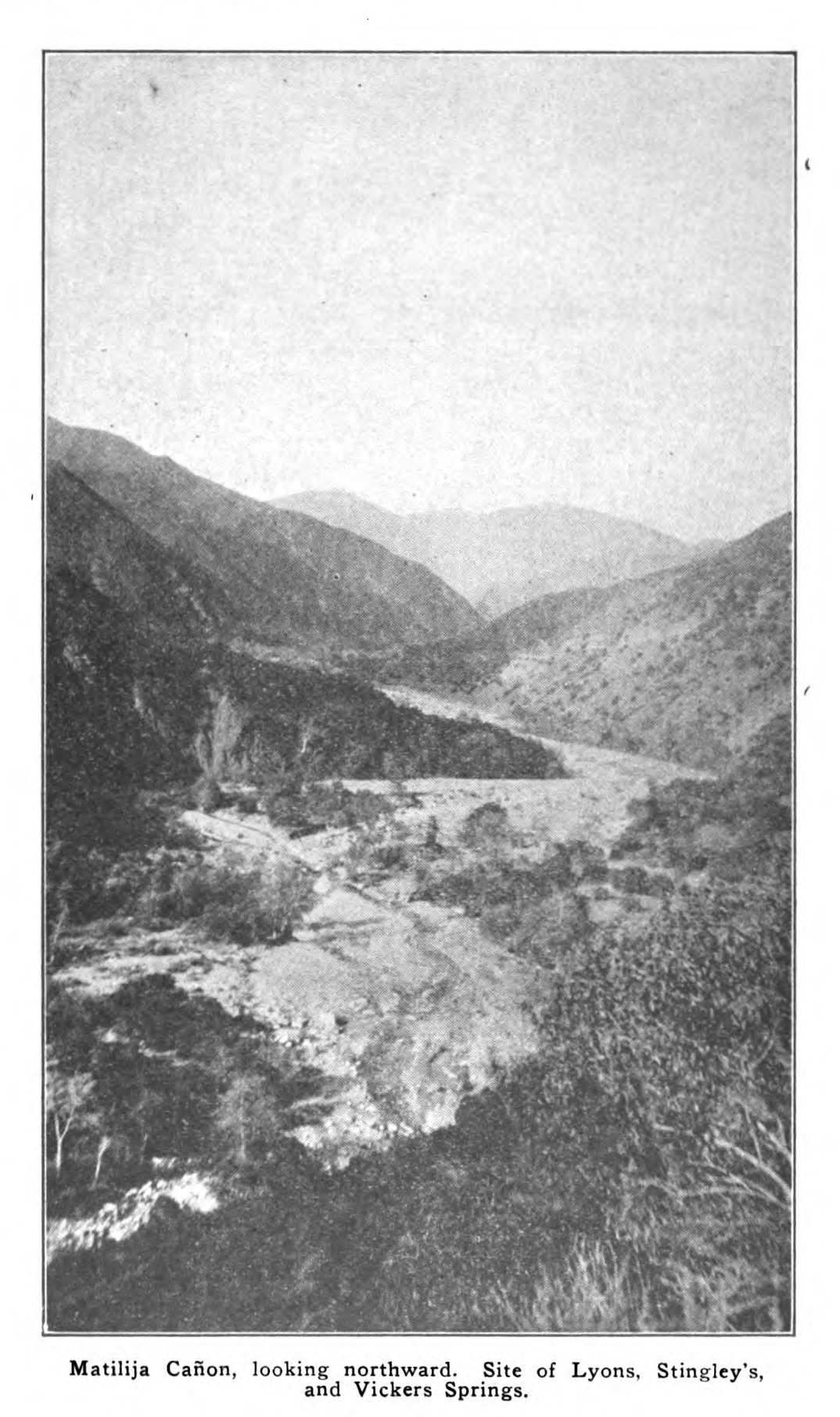
Matilija Creek canyon, pictured c. 1917, was host to not just Matilija Hot Springs, but Lyons Springs, the short-lived Vickers Springs resort (1873–1884), and Stingley's Hot Springs (which were eventually submerged under the creek).

The Matilija Wilderness was established by Congress as part of the Los Padres Condor Range and River Protection Act of 1992. The bill also established the neighboring Sespe Wilderness and five other wilderness areas in the Los Padres National Forest, with the express purpose of "fire prevention and watershed protection in such areas" and "activities that maintain and restore fish and wildlife populations and their habitats (including the California condor) inside them". It also listed part of Matilija Creek to be considered for the National Wild and Scenic Rivers System, although it was later not designated as such.

The wilderness was the scene of a controversy starting in 2010 when landowners along the Matilija Trail threatened to close access. A coalition of environmental groups and hikers reached a settlement in 2016 for a public easement through the Bonsall ranch, in return for relocating part of the trail east of Matilija Creek and putting up signs to discourage trespassing off-trail.

The entire Matilija Wilderness was burned to various degrees during the Thomas Fire in December 2017. The area has burned on a large scale several other times in the 20th century, including the 1932 Matilija Fire, and the 1985 Wheeler Fire.

== Activities ==
The Matilija Trail follows the stream bed of Matilija Creek into the wilderness; however, the more remote sections of the trail are unmaintained and have been washed out in places. Matilija Falls, a multi-tiered waterfall known for its swimming holes, is located deep in the wilderness at the end of a difficult 9-mile (14 km) roundtrip hike. USGS topographic maps show at least five waterfalls in the wilderness along Matilija Creek and its tributaries, although not all of them are accessible by trails.

The 9.1-mile (14.6 km) North Fork Matilija Trail follows the Upper North Fork of Matilija Creek. Several primitive campgrounds are located along the trail, which can be accessed from the south via Forest Road 5N13 (Matilija Canyon Road) and from the north via Cherry Creek Road, both off Highway 33. Road 5N13 continues west through Murrietta Canyon, offering hikers, riders and mountain bikers a path to the Upper Santa Ynez Recreation Area.

There is also fishing in Matilija Creek during certain seasons.

== See also ==
- List of U.S. Wilderness Areas
- Lyons Springs
- Matilija Fire
- Ventura County Historic Landmarks & Points of Interest
