= Ventura station =

Train station in Ventura, California, US

Ventura, CA
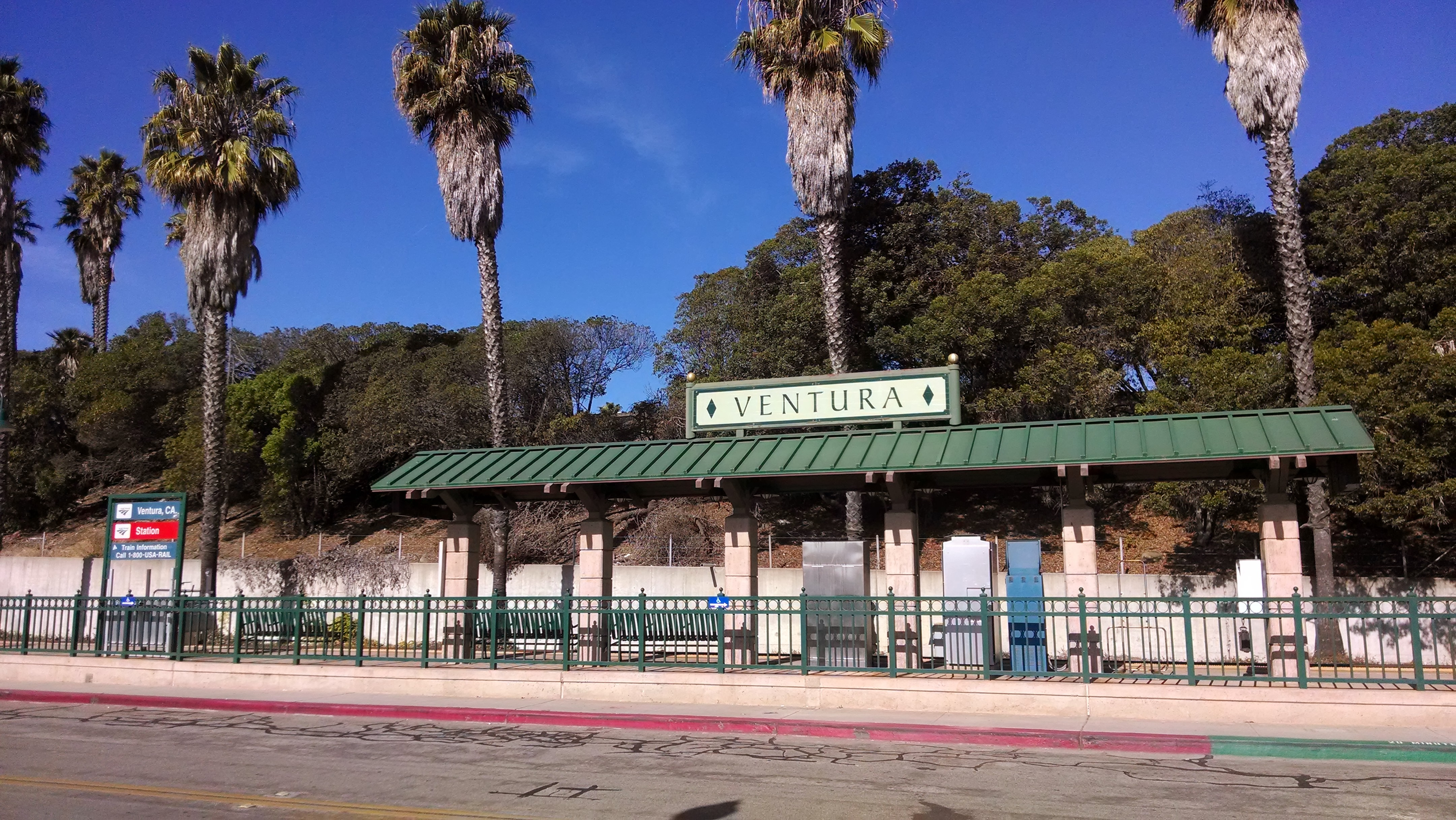
- Ventura station platform in front of freeway embankment

General information
- Other names: Ventura–Downtown/Beach
- Location: 20 West Harbor Boulevard; Ventura, California; United States
- Coordinates: 34°16′37″N 119°18′00″W
- Owner: City of Ventura
- Line: UP Santa Barbara Subdivision
- Platforms: 1 side platform
- Tracks: 1
- Connections: Amtrak Thruway: 10; Flixbus

Construction
- Parking: Paid parking nearby
- Cycle facilities: Yes
- Accessible: Yes

Other information
- Status: Unstaffed, platform with shelters
- Station code: Amtrak: VEC

History
- Opened: April 22, 1992

Passengers
- FY 2025: 79,936 (Amtrak)

Services
Preceding station	Amtrak	Following station
Carpinteria toward San Luis Obispo	Pacific Surfliner	Oxnard toward San Diego
Coast Starlight does not stop here
Future services
Preceding station	Metrolink	Following station
Terminus	Ventura County Line	Ventura–East toward L.A. Union Station
Former services
Preceding station	Southern Pacific Railroad	Following station
La Conchita toward San Francisco	Coast Line	East Ventura toward Los Angeles
Terminus	Ventura – Ojai	Ojai Terminus
Location

Ventura station (referred to as Ventura–Downtown/Beach station by Metrolink) is a passenger rail station in downtown Ventura, California. The station is served by Amtrak's Pacific Surfliner from San Luis Obispo to San Diego. Ten Pacific Surfliner trains serve the station daily. Of the 73 California stations served by Amtrak, Ventura was the 33rd-busiest in FY2010, boarding or detraining an average of approximately 125 passengers daily. The single platform is located on the south side of the tracks with a view of the Santa Barbara Channel and the Channel Islands. The Ventura Freeway (U.S. Route 101) is parallel with and on the north side of tracks.

Ventura station is served by 10 Amtrak Pacific Surfliner trains (5 in each direction) evenly spaced throughout the day.

Metrolink’s Ventura County Line terminus is in Montalvo at the Ventura–East station since overnight storage of trains in the downtown area was impractical. Special service trains may come to this station such as service to the Ventura County Fair, in season. In March 2022, Metrolink announced that Ventura County Line trains will terminate at this station sometime in the future.

== History ==
The platform is located on a portion of Coast Line between the Ventura River and Ash Street that is under franchise from the City of Ventura. Having approved an official map in 1869, the town trustees approved the laying down of tracks on Front Street through the existing townsite. Approval was conditioned on Southern Pacific Branch Railway building and maintaining a depot within the corporate limits. The original train station was located about a half mile east (towards Oxnard) within the Eastern Addition to the town. Ventura Junction where the Ventura and Ojai Valley Railroad Company branched off up along the Ventura River is just west of the station. The rails reached the town of Nordhoff in 1898 and the line was acquired by Southern Pacific Transportation Company in 1899. The Ventura River Parkway Trail has been constructed within the abandoned railroad right-of-way.

E.P. and Orpha Foster donated much of the land for Seaside Park (home of the Ventura County Fair) adjacent to the station. They envisioned this broad flat area as a beautiful gateway to Ventura, where families could walk, picnic, and enjoy family outings.

The large parking lot across Harbor Boulevard from the station is the former site of Babe Ruth Field. The minor-league team games that played there from 1948 to 1955 were appreciated by the adjacent neighborhood called Tortilla Flats. This neighborhood was eliminated with the construction of the freeway but is remembered with a mural project in the Figueroa Street freeway underpass, at the east end of the station, that leads to the Mission San Buenaventura Historic District and downtown.

A car carrier trailer leaving the fairgrounds with vintage Porsche automobiles "high-centered" as it crossed the tracks near the station and became stranded in 2004. Although the police notified Union Pacific, there was just enough time to get the driver out of the truck cab that was pulling the car-carrier before the collision. A northbound freight train hit the center of the trailer scattering the vintage cars alongside the tracks.

=== Coastal access ===
The station is on the Pacific Coast Bicycle Route and also serves as an access point for California Coastal Trail. Figueroa Street leads down to beachfront Promenade Park and Surfers' Point at Seaside Park. The promenade is a walking/bike trail that leads down coast to San Buenaventura State Beach after passing underneath the second oldest pier in California. Up coast the path leads to Emma Wood State Beach and has been designated the Omer Rains Bike Trail. Beachwalkers will find sand and cobble beaches while walking to these state parks. While crossing the sand bar at the mouth of the Ventura River may be possible, the bike route is an alternate route for walkers. The rustic railroad bridge over the river has been an attractive and apparent short-cut but the curve in the middle of the river limits visibility for this illegal and dangerous river crossing.
