= Casitas =

Casitas may refer to:

- Casitas Dam, dam on Coyote Creek near Ojai, California
- Lake Casitas, lake in Ventura County, California, formed by Casitas Dam
- Casitas District, Contralmirante Villar, Peru
