= Matilija Dam =

Arch dam in Ventura County, California

Coordinates: 34°29′06″N 119°18′30″W

- View of Matilija Dam from the air in 2015

- Location of the Matilija Dam, Ventura County, California
- Country: United States
- Location: Ojai, California
- Status: Completely silted
- Construction began: 18 June 1946
- Opening date: 1947
- Construction cost: ≈$4M
- Owner: Ventura County Watershed Protection District

Dam and spillways
- Type of dam: Concrete arch dam
- Height: 198 ft (60 m) (original)
- Length: 620 ft (190 m)

Reservoir
- Creates: Matilija Reservoir
- Total capacity: 7,018 acre⋅ft (8,657,000 m^{3}) (original) none (current)

Matilija Dam is a concrete arch dam in Ventura County, California, completed in 1947. Designed for water storage and flood control, it impounds Matilija Creek to create the Matilija Reservoir in the Los Padres National Forest, south of the Matilija Wilderness and north of Ojai.

The drainage area above the damsite is 55 square miles (140 km^{2}), and the reservoir had an original capacity of 7,018 acre⋅ft (8,657,000 m^{3}). Matilija Creek flows on to become the main tributary of the Ventura River.

Matilija was one of the Chumash rancherias under the jurisdiction of Mission San Buenaventura. According to Dartt-Newton and Erlandson writing in American Indian Quarterly, the name Chumash means "bead maker" or "seashell people" being that they originated near the Santa Barbara coast (Newton 416).

== History ==
In the 1940s, the Ventura County Flood Control District was formed to manage water resources along the Ventura River. A dam on Matilija Creek was proposed as part of a project to improve groundwater recharge around Ojai, where groundwater reserves had been exhausted by agricultural use and drought. In 1941 the U.S. Army Corps of Engineers warned that the dam would not be economically effective, as the steep, erosive topography upstream would cause it to silt up quickly. However, the project moved forward and in 1945 the county issued $682,000 in revenue bonds to fund it. Construction began on 18 June 1946 and was completed on 14 March 1948 at a cost of nearly $4 million, six times the original estimate.

The dam flooded an area that was used for recreation, including land belonging to the Matilija Hot Springs resort, and blocked access to spawning habitat for steelhead trout, as the dam was built without a fish ladder. Prior to the dam's construction, an estimated 5,000 steelhead spawned in the Ventura River each year; afterwards this dropped to a few hundred. In 1949, there was a major upstream fish kill caused by heated and/or stagnant water in the reservoir. The reservoir filled for the first time in 1952, and in 1959 dam operations were transferred to the Casitas Municipal Water District.

Modern officials describe the dam design as "flawed from the outset". Many experts including the U.S. Army Corps of Engineers and the California Department of Fish and Game aligned themselves against the project, and before construction an architect advised that the proposed materials would react together badly. An engineering survey twenty years later proved him right, finding "internal swelling, external cracking, disintegration of the wall and movement of the abutments".

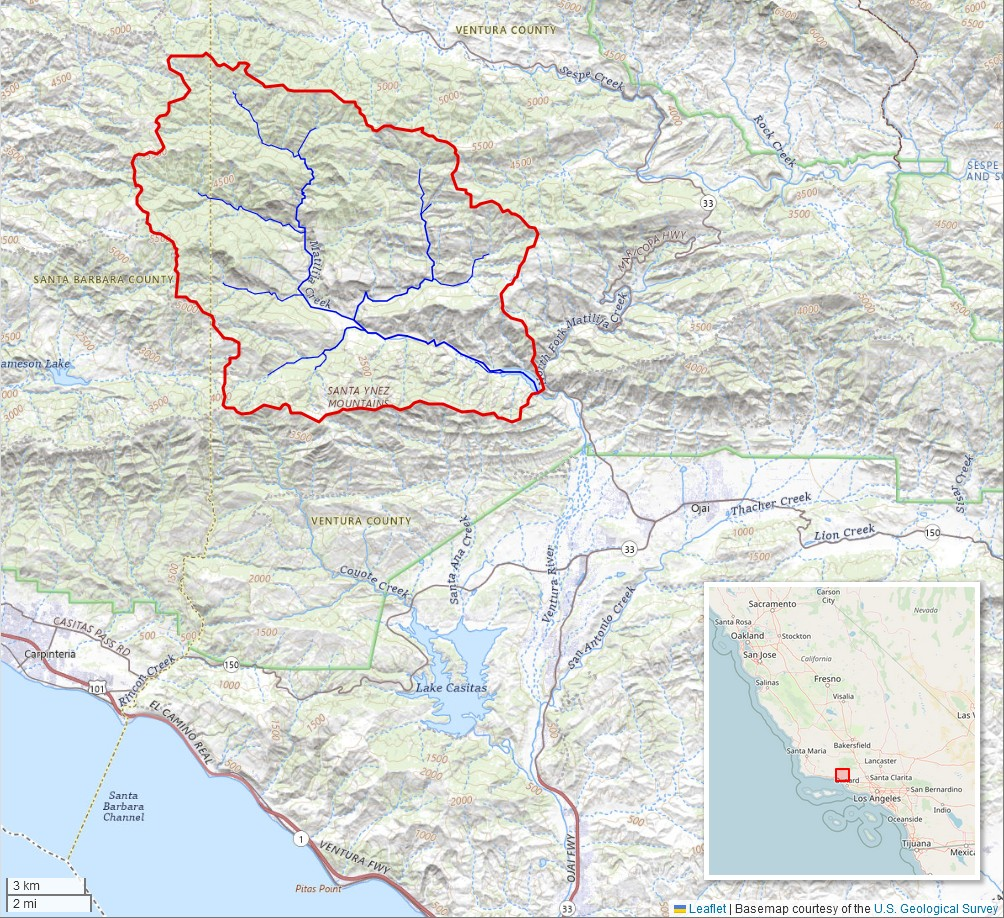
Drainage basin of the Matilija Dam (Interactive map)

Almost immediately after construction, the dam began silting up. The dam traps about 30% of the total sediment in the Ventura River system, depriving ocean beaches of replenishing sediment. Initially, engineers had estimated it would take 39 years for the reservoir to fill with silt, but within a few years it was clear that the siltation rate was much faster than anticipated. In 1964 a safety study was commissioned from Bechtel Corporation, which determined the dam was unsafe and recommended removal. At the time, removal was projected to cost $300,000. The county decided to notch the dam face instead, reducing its effective height by 30 feet (9.1 m), leaving the dam in place while reducing water pressure on the structure. In 1978 the dam was notched a second time. Taking into account the reservoir's reduced capacity and losses to sedimentation, the reservoir was projected to be completely silted up by the year 2020, and by 2021 it had been deemed completely filled with silt and gravel.

== Proposed removal ==
Ventura County officially set the course for removal of the dam as early as 1998. In October 2000 United States Secretary of the Interior Bruce Babbitt visited the site, operated a crane to remove a ceremonial concrete slab from the dam face, and brought national attention to the then-novel concept of dam removal. The dam has been a candidate for removal since that time, along with the 1924 Rindge Dam near Malibu, completely silted up since 1950, and also blocking steelhead trout spawning grounds.

The removal has been delayed by concerns over its potential impacts on flooding and the ecology of the Ventura River. The large amount of sediment trapped behind the dam, if released, could clog up the river channel and overwhelm the downstream Robles Diversion Dam, the primary source of water for Lake Casitas. In 2004, the U.S. Army Corps of Engineers estimated that to remove all the sediment behind the dam would cost $200 million. Manually removing the sediment would be impractical, as it would require hundreds of thousands of truck trips, and there is no place to dump the sediment. As an alternative, the Ventura County Watershed Protection District and the Army Corps developed a plan that would remove about one-fourth of the sediment before removing the dam, then stabilize part of the remaining sediment with soil cement. The stabilizing layers would be gradually removed over a period of several years, allowing natural high flows to flush the accumulated sediments downstream. A bill funding the Matilija Dam Ecosystem Restoration Project reached Congress and survived President Bush's veto in November 2007, but the actual funding stalled.

In 2011, activists painted a dotted line and a large pair of scissors on the face of the dam. The graffiti was seen as a commentary on the slow pace of the removal process, and was embraced by Ventura County, appearing in the logo of the Matilija Dam Ecosystem Restoration Project. The act was documented in the 2014 film DamNation.

In 2016 the Ventura County watershed Protection District and AECOM released a report which proposed several alternative options for removing the dam.

- Construct an upstream cofferdam and bypass tunnel to divert Matilija Creek away from the dam site while the dam is being removed. The cofferdam would be designed to breach during a flooding event with sufficiently high flows to transport sediment to the ocean.
- Drill holes in the bottom of the dam, with plugs that can be removed during a flood event, allowing high flows to naturally sluice sediment out of the reservoir. Once enough sediment is removed, the dam can be demolished.
- Store and temporarily stabilize excavated sediments upstream of the dam, before demolishing the dam. These sediment "stockpiles" would remain in place and be gradually eroded away during high flow events, so as not to excessively raise sediment volumes in the Ventura River.

In 2017, the California Department of Fish and Wildlife provided $3.3 million to fund the design phase for the selected alternative. The most recent proposal, projected to cost $111 million, will involve drilling a pair of 12-foot (3.7 m) diameter holes in the bottom of the Matilija Dam, as well as replacing two bridges on the Ventura River and upgrading the Robles diversion dam to handle increased sediment flows. The California Wildlife Conservation Board has provided two grants for the design phase.

== See also ==
- Dam removal
- San Clemente Dam
