= Lyons Hot Springs =

Ventura County, California, U.S.

Lyon Spring
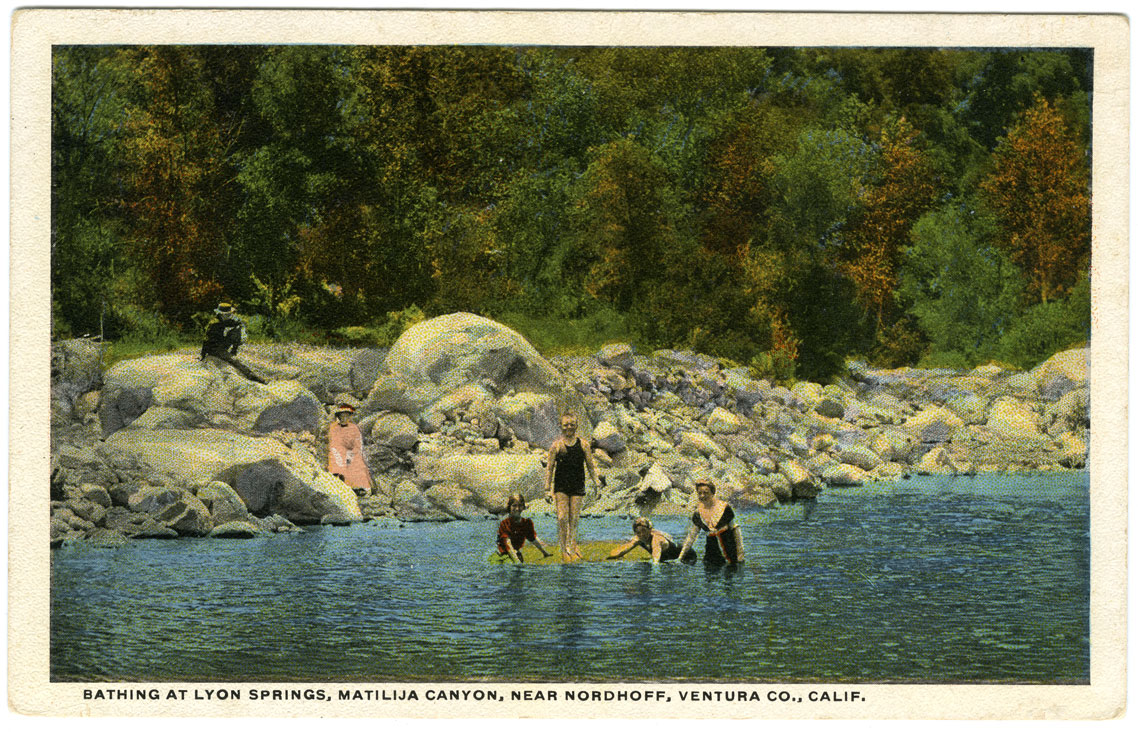
- Postcard c. 1918, Ventura Museum
- Interactive map of Lyon Spring
- Location: 1,240 feet (380 m)
- Coordinates: 34.45°N 119.3408°W

Lyons Springs, sometimes Lyon Spring, originally Nogales Hot Springs, was a naturally occurring sulphur spring and associated resort in Matilija Creek Canyon, near Ojai, Ventura County, California. Located between Vickers Springs and Matilija Hot Springs, the Lyon Spring resort was established in the 1880s.

== History ==
The retreat was known as Nogales Hot Springs when it was first opened in 1887. The location is named for owner Gertrude A. Lyons. Another account says the Springs belonged to the "imfamous Robert Lyon and his 'mountain lion-chasing daughters'". The springs were part of a larger "popularity of mineral hot springs as places for recreation and restoration of health in the early 20th century". The resort was seasonal, open only in summer.

According to a U.S. government geologist who visited circa 1908, the resort accommodated about 50 people in tent houses. A 1910s-era postcard held at the Ventura Museum shows a "campsite of simple white tents, a trail head marked by wood posts in the foreground heads off into the trees." At that time water was piped 1,100 feet (340 m) "to a small stone reservoir on the grounds. It is thence piped to a boiler and heated for bathing. It is soft and mildly sulphureted, being known as a white-sulphur water from the slight milkiness that is produced by sulphur in suspension." Fishing for rainbow and steelhead trout in the nearby stream was a popular pastime for visitors. A California State Mining Bureau report of 1917 described the mineral qualities as similar to those of Matilija and Vickers. At that time the property had been "idle for several years".

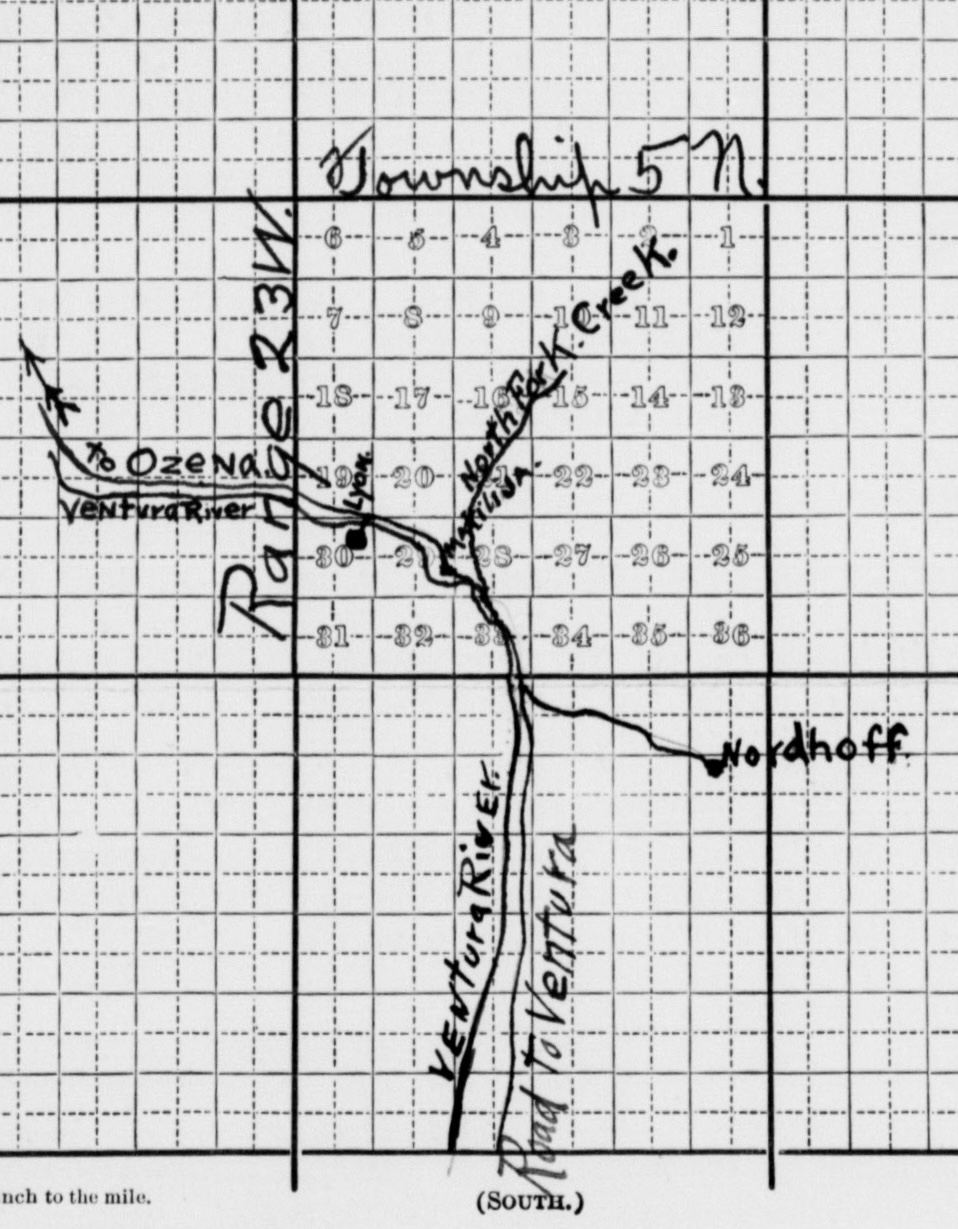
1905 map of Lyons or Lyons Springs submitted with post office application; Nordhoff was the original name of Ojai

The spring vent is said to be submerged underwater, within what is now the Matilija Dam reservoir, and the temperate averages 65 °F (18 °C) or "not hot enough to be interesting".
