= Ortonville, California =

Unincorporated community in California, United States

- Unincorporated community
- Location within California Location within the United States
- Coordinates: 34°19′17″N 119°17′29″W
- Country: United States
- State: California
- County: Ventura
- Elevation: 148 ft (45 m)
- Time zone: UTC-8 (Pacific (PST))
  - Summer (DST): UTC-7 (PDT)
- Postal code: 93001
- Area code: 805
- GNIS feature ID: 1661160

Ortonville is an unincorporated community of Ventura County, California, United States. Ortonville is located along California State Route 33, 4.8 miles (7.7 km) northwest of Ventura. Ortonville lies north of the unincorporated community Wadstrom and south of the unincorporated community Weldons. All three were served by the 20th century Ventura and Ojai Valley Railroad.

Two mobile home parks are just north of the site of this historical place name; Canon De Las Encinas Park and Magnolia Park.
