= Casitas Dam =

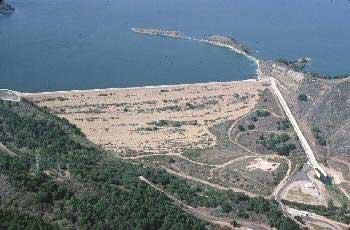
- Interactive map of Casitas Dam
- Location: Ventura County, California
- Coordinates: 34.3783°N 119.3309°W
- Construction began: 1956; 70 years ago
- Opening date: 1959; 67 years ago
- Operator: Bureau of Reclamation

Dam and spillways
- Impounds: Coyote Creek
- Height: 334 ft (102 m)
- Length: 2,000 ft (610 m)

Reservoir
- Creates: Lake Casitas
- Total capacity: 254,000 acre⋅ft (313,000,000 m^{3})
- Catchment area: 39 sq mi (100 km^{2})
- Surface area: 2,700 acres (1,100 ha)

Casitas Dam is an earthfill dam across Coyote Creek that forms Lake Casitas in Ventura County, California, near Oak View, California. Located two miles (3 km) above the junction of Coyote Creek and the Ventura River, it is 334 ft (102 m) tall and 2,000 ft (610 m) long. The structure was built by the U.S. Bureau of Reclamation, and completed in 1959. It is a key part of the Ventura River Project, and was strengthened in June–December 2000 as a seismic improvement to help withstand earthquakes greater than 6.5. Lake Casitas has a catchment of 39 sq mi (100 km^{2}), a storage capacity of 254,000 acre⋅ft (313,000,000 m^{3}), and provides irrigation and municipal uses for the Casitas Municipal Water District.

== See also ==
- List of dams and reservoirs in California
- List of largest reservoirs of California
