= Ventura and Ojai Valley Railroad =

Railroad in California, U.S.

Overview
- Locale: Ventura County, California
- Dates of operation: 1898–1995
- Successor: Southern Pacific

Technical
- Track gauge: 4 ft 8 1/2 in (1,435 mm) standard gauge
- Length: 16 miles (26 km)

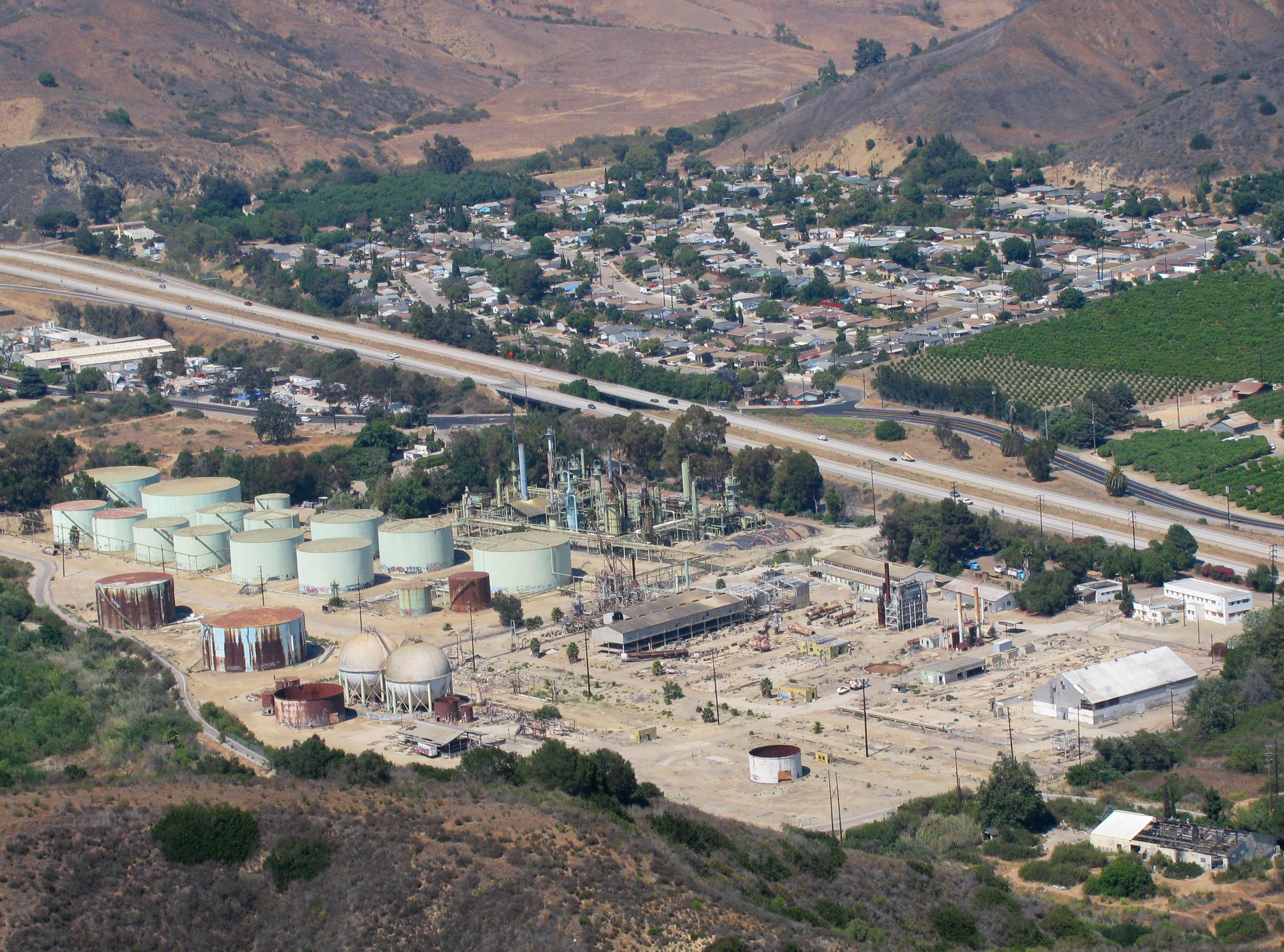
The 1969 flood ended rail service upstream of this refinery at Canet.

The Ventura and Ojai Valley Railroad gave Ojai, California, a connection to the national rail network Pacific Coast Line at Ventura Junction. Ventura Junction was located at Southern Pacific Railroad milepost (MP) 397.3 a short distance west of Ventura station. The railway required grades as steep as three percent following the Ventura River upstream through Chrisman, Wadstrom, Ortonville, and then turning east through Mira Monte into Ojai. The line completed by Captain John Cross in 1898 became a branch of the Southern Pacific Railroad in 1899. The first passenger train reached Ojai (then called Nordhoff) on 12 March 1898. Trains leaving Ojai at 07:20 and 16:00 made passenger stops at Grant (near Rotary Community Park), Tico, Las Cross, and Weldons before turning around at Ventura to return to Ojai at 13:00 and 20:15. Southern Pacific operated only one daily passenger train during the summer months; and all passenger service ended in the early 1930s.

Sources of freight included the Ojai Olive Company olive oil extraction plant built near the Ojai depot in 1901, and the Ojai Orange Association citrus packing house built on the east side of Bryant Street about 1910. The packing house was handling from 15% to 20% of the Ventura County citrus production before World War II, and a Shell Oil refinery near the Ventura River shipped refined petroleum products from the Ventura Oil Field.

== Demise ==
A Pineapple Express beginning on January 18, 1969 caused the largest and most damaging recorded flood on the Ventura River watershed. Rainfall intensity at Ojai reached 6.2 inches (16 cm) per day. Flood damage caused abandonment of the railway upstream of MP 402.68; however, freight service to the refinery at Canet continued until Southern Pacific filed for abandonment of the branch in 1995. The upstream portion of the rail line from Foster Park to Ojai, abandoned in 1969, became the Ojai Valley Trail completed in 1989; the remaining downstream portion of the line was later opened as the Ventura River Trail in October of 1999.

== Locomotives ==
Number	Wheel Arrangement	Builder	Builder Number	Date Built	Date Purchased	Disposition	Notes
1	4-4-0	Danforth, Cooke & Company	1004	1875	1896	Most likely scrapped after take over by SP.	Originally built for the Los Angeles & Independence. Purchased from Southern Pacific, was SP#1170.
2	4-4-0	Danforth, Cooke & Company	1005	1875	1896	Most likely scrapped after take over by SP.	Originally built for the Los Angeles & Independence. Purchased from Southern Pacific, was SP#1171.
