= Matilija Fire =

1932 wildfire in Southern California

- Date: September 7, 1932 –; September 20, 1932; (14 days)
- Location: North of Ventura, California
- Coordinates: 34.59°N 119.44°W

Statistics
- Burned area: 219,254 acres (88,729 ha; 343 mi^{2}; 887 km^{2})

Impacts
- Deaths: None known
- Injuries: 2 firefighters injured
- Cost: $120,000 (1932 USD)

Ignition
- Cause: Unknown, possibly escaped campfire

Map
- Location in California

Location of Matilija Fire

The Matilija Fire was a major wildfire that burned nearly 220,000 acres (89,000 ha) in the Santa Barbara National Forest (now Los Padres National Forest) of Southern California, during the autumn of 1932. The fire is named for Matilija Creek, near the location from which it originated.

With the possible exception of the Santiago Canyon Fire of 1889 (which occurred before the start of official record-keeping), it was the largest-known wildfire in California history until the 2003 Cedar Fire. The Matilija Fire is currently the 18th largest in the state's modern history.

== Progression ==
In 1932, most of the area burned by the Matilija Fire had not seen a major fire since at least 1911. The area had also been experiencing severe drought conditions for the two years prior to 1932. This had resulted in a major build-up of dry fuels in the chaparral, which typically burns every 10 or 15 years.

The 1932 fire season had been relatively quiet for the Santa Barbara National Forest. At 10:00 a.m. local time on September 7, smoke was spotted from La Cumbre lookout, rising from the North Fork of Matilija Creek north of Ojai. Ojai District Ranger E.L. Baxter ordered a fire crew to make preparations while he traveled out in advance to scout the fire. It took two hours to reach the fire, by which time it had expanded to 300 acres (120 ha). Although the cause of the fire remains uncertain, it may have been started by a hunter's campfire or an exploding tank of butane gas.

By evening, fire crews were hiking up to the site, and Baxter expected the fire to be contained at 600 acres (240 ha) by midnight. However, heavy Santa Ana winds kicked up at 5:30 p.m., and the fire exploded in size. Fifty men on a crew led by Supervisor Nash-Boulden were trapped, but they managed to survive after lighting a backfire on the canyon slope, pulling in fresh air and opening an escape route. High temperatures, low humidity and 50 mph (80 km/h) winds sent the fire burning quickly through the thick chaparral covering the mountains. By midday on September 8, the fire had grown to 28,000 acres (11,000 ha) and was rapidly spreading to the south and east. In one hour the fire traveled 15 miles (24 km) as embers jumped from one ridge to the next. Due to the unpredictable winds, crews were unable to safely cut line ahead of the fire, and resorted to "cold-trailing", or cutting line along the edges of already-burned areas.

For the next eleven days, the fire burned 10,000 to 20,000 acres (4,000 to 8,100 ha) daily. About 2,500 to 3,000 firefighters were ultimately brought in to the Matilija Fire, coming from eight forests around the West. As many as 1,200 personnel were on the fire line at any one time. There were few roads into this area, and the rugged terrain and thick vegetation made access difficult. Supplies had to be transported by pack mules and horses, or dropped from airplanes. Bulldozers were also used in an attempt to open new roads, but this effort was largely unsuccessful. By September 10, the fire had reached south nearly to the Pacific Ocean, had jumped west into the upper Santa Ynez River drainage, and was advancing swiftly east into the Sespe Creek drainage. A wall of flame 5 miles (8 km) wide swept 12 miles (19 km) down Sespe Creek, burning as much as 35,000 acres (14,000 ha) in a single hour. By the evening of September 10 the fire was at 90,000 acres (36,000 ha) with no containment.

Hand crews cut 450 to 500 miles (720 to 800 km) of line around the perimeter of the fire, but high winds repeatedly blew fire past the containment lines and progress was extremely slow. Three fire camps were destroyed and a fourth was narrowly saved. By September 13, the fire had burned as far north as Reyes Peak (near Pine Mountain), and the lookout tower there was destroyed. By September 18, it had reached Santa Paula Peak, more than 30 miles (48 km) east of Matilija Creek. The fire lookout there was threatened, but was saved by a backfire at the last minute. Fire activity finally decreased around September 18, when the Santa Ana winds ceased. A heavy fog came in from the Pacific Ocean, elevating humidity, and by September 20, crews had managed to cut a line around the entire fire and contain it.

== Effects ==
The fire ultimately cost $120,000 ($2.3 million today) in suppression costs. A total of 219,254 acres (88,729 ha) were burned, including 10,700 acres (4,300 ha) outside national forest lands. The burn area stretched 32 miles (51 km) from east to west and 11 miles (18 km) from north to south, reaching as far as Carpinteria on the southwest and nearly to Fillmore on the east. Despite the size of the fire, there were no fatalities and only two serious injuries during the firefighting effort. This was attributed to the fact that "this was the first large fire in California where most of the firefighters were members of trained crews." U.S. Forest Service officials cited inadequate fire lookout coverage as the primary reason for the failure to control the blaze. The fire started in a place difficult to see from existing lookouts, and may have burned for hours before the smoke was initially spotted.

The lack of good access roads was cited as another obstacle to fighting the fire. Within two weeks of the end of the fire, bids were opened for construction of State Route 399 (today's State Route 33), which runs between Ojai and Maricopa. The road would have run through the approximate center of the Matilija fire and if it had existed, the fire could perhaps have been stopped there. During the fire, protocols were established for inter-agency (state and federal) coordination, and a need was recognized for standardization of training and terminology for fire crews. However, the fire had little overall impact on federal policy, especially since the rest of the 1930s saw much lower fire activity in California.

Large debris flows occurred in the rainy seasons after the fire, causing extensive property damage and silting in reservoirs. Massive volumes of sediment went down the Santa Ynez River into the reservoir behind Gibraltar Dam, the primary source of drinking water for the city of Santa Barbara. The Forest Service built debris dams on Agua Caliente Creek and Mono Creek, tributaries of the Santa Ynez River, in an effort to protect Gibraltar. Within two years, the debris dams had filled in with more than 1,000 acre⋅ft (1.2 million m^{3}) of sediment.

== See also ==
- List of California wildfires
