= Coyote Creek (Ventura County) =

Stream in Ventura County, California, US

Coyote Creek is a stream in Ventura County, California, United States, which feeds Lake Casitas. It is a major tributary of the Ventura River.

34.354165°N 119.310669°W
