= Matilija Creek =

Matilija Creek Arroyo Matilija
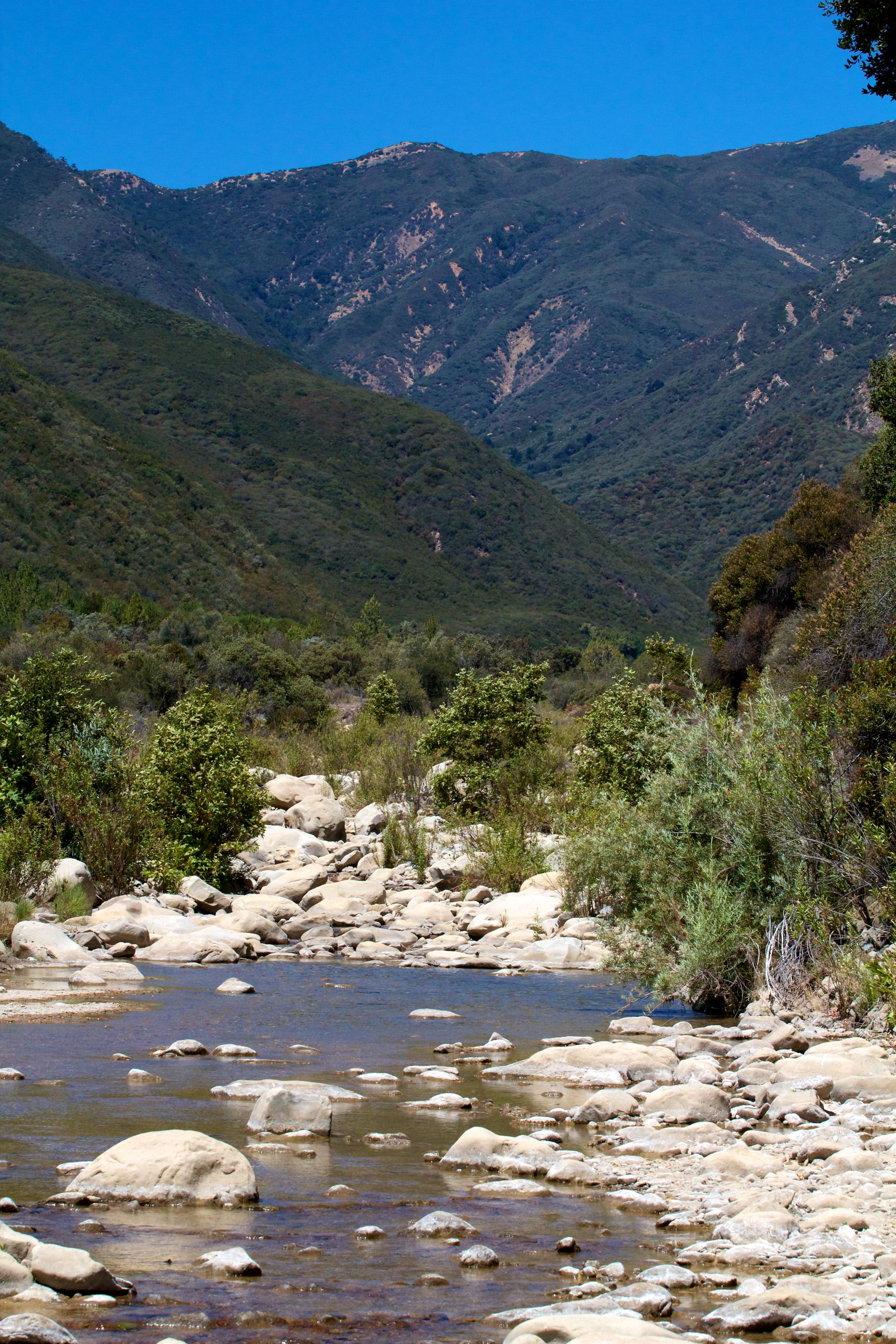
- Matilija Creek in the Matilija Wilderness

Location
- Country: United States of America
- State: California

Physical characteristics
- Source
  - location: Santa Ynez Mountains, Santa Barbara County
  - coordinates: 34°35′45″N 119°27′31″W
  - elevation: 5,200 ft (1,600 m)
- Mouth: Ventura River
  - location: Ventura County
  - coordinates: 34°29′06″N 119°18′01″W
  - elevation: 915 ft (279 m)
- Length: 18 mi (29 km)
- Basin size: 54.6 mi^{2} (141 km^{2})
- Discharge
  - location: near Matilija Hot Springs
  - average: 43.3 cu ft/s (1.23 m^{3}/s)
  - minimum: 0.03 cu ft/s (0.00085 m^{3}/s)
  - maximum: 8,780 cu ft/s (249 m^{3}/s)

Basin features
- Tributaries
  - left: Middle Fork Matilija Creek, Upper North Fork Matilija Creek, North Fork Matilija Creek
  - right: Old Man Canyon, Murietta Canyon

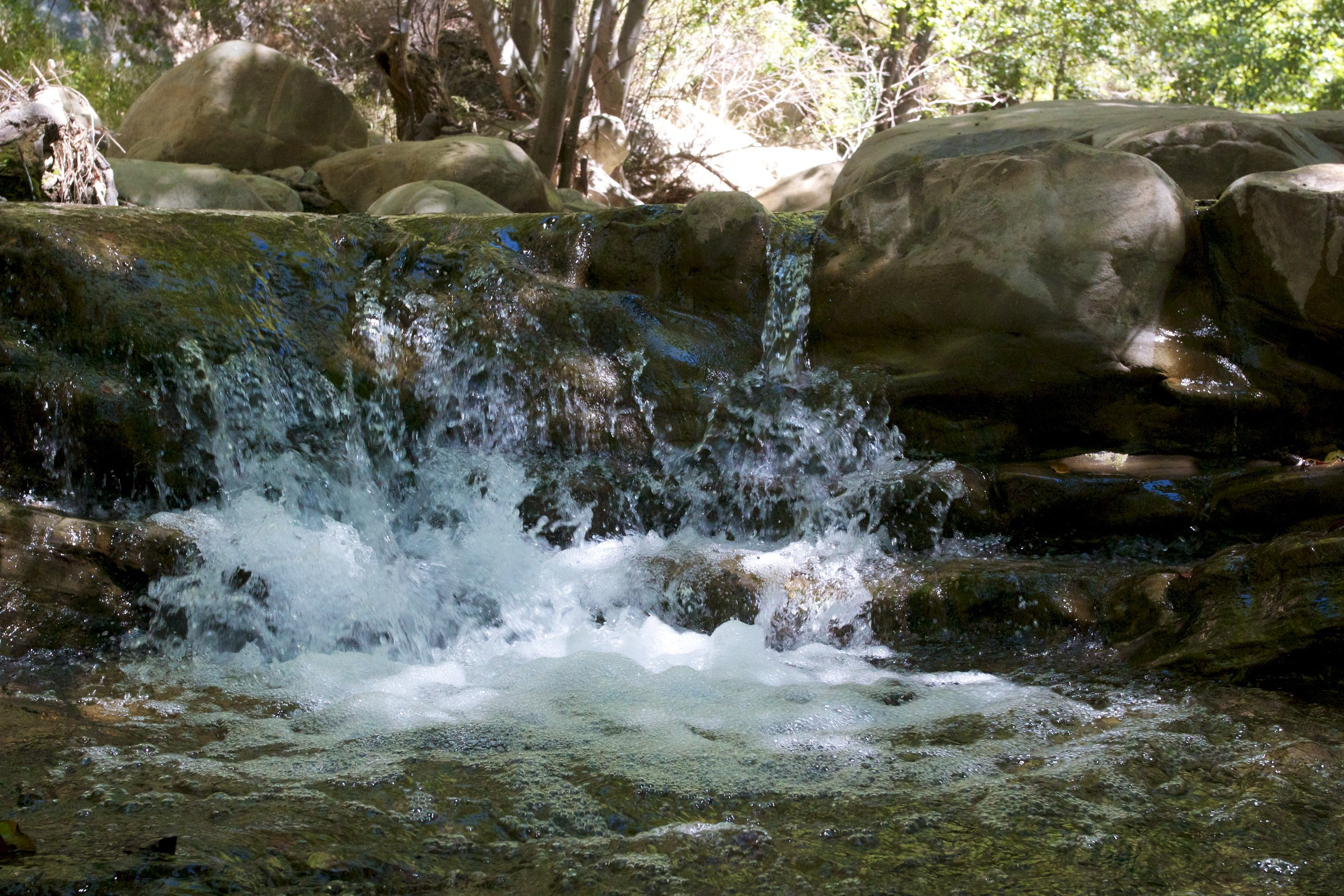
Matilija Falls

Matilija Creek (/məˈtɪlɪhɑː/ mə-TIL-i-hah) is a major stream in Ventura County in the U.S. state of California. It joins with North Fork Matilija Creek to form the Ventura River. Many tributaries feed the mostly free flowing, 17.3-mile (27.8 km) creek, which is largely contained in the Matilija Wilderness. Matilija was one of the Chumash rancherias under the jurisdiction of Mission San Buenaventura. The meaning of the Chumash name is unknown.

== Course ==
From its headwaters south of Sespe Creek in the Matilija Wilderness in Santa Barbara County, the creek flows east then south through a narrow V-shaped canyon into Ventura County. Below Matilija Falls it turns east and receives the Upper North Fork from the left, and almost immediately below that the West Fork (Murietta Canyon) from the right. The creek then flows east through a wider valley along the north side of the Santa Ynez Mountains before it empties into the mostly silted in Matilija Lake reservoir, formed by the 200-foot (61 m) high concrete arch Matilija Dam. Below the dam the creek flows southeast, through Matilija Hot Springs, and meets the North Fork Matilija Creek at the hamlet of Ojala, forming the Ventura River.

The smaller North Fork Matilija Creek flows west and south from its headwaters near Rose Valley. The North Fork runs southwest, along Forest Route 6N31, and receives Cannon Creek from the right and Bear Creek from the left. It then cascades through the narrow Wheeler Gorge and through the community of Wheeler Springs. It flows briefly east and joins Matilija Creek shortly downstream. Highway 33 largely parallels the North Fork, from the top of Dry Lakes Ridge to the mouth.

Fed by some perennial springs, despite its location in arid terrain, the creek flows year round, and can flood severely following winter storms.

== Ecology ==
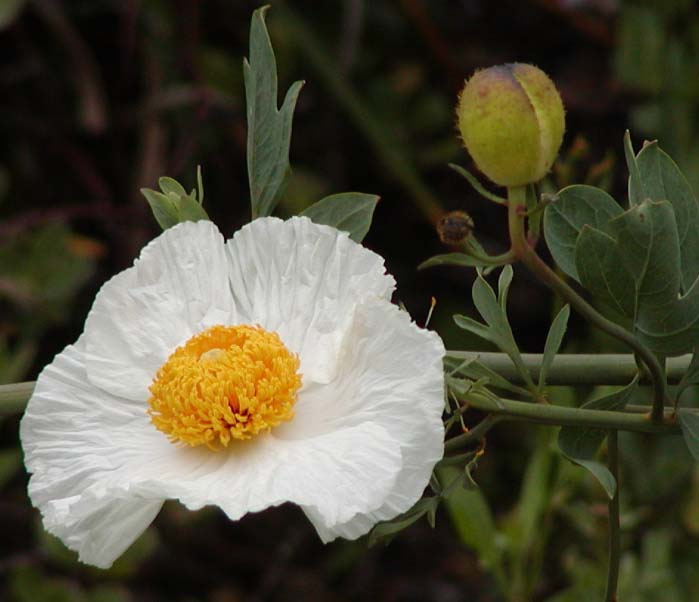
Matilija poppy native to the Matilija Creek canyon.

The name of the Matilija poppy (Romneya) is taken from the Matilija creek canyon. The Matilija Dam was constructed in 1947 on lower Matilija Creek for the purpose of supplying water storage and flood control, blocking access of anadromous Steelhead trout (Oncorhynchus mykiss) to over ten miles (16 km) of upstream spawning areas. Historically 5,000 steelhead trout used the upper Matilija basin. The Robles Diversion Dam on the Ventura River downstream posed a barrier to trout migration until a $6 million fish ladder was constructed in 2006. Recent genetic analysis of the steelhead in Matilija Creek (both above and below Matilija Dam) has shown them to be of native and not hatchery stocks.

== River modifications ==
The creek has one dam on it, Matilija Dam, built in 1947 to provide flood control and water supply for agricultural and urban uses in Ventura County. When completed, the dam was 190 feet (58 m) high and could impound more than 7,000 acre-feet (0.0086 km^{3}) of water. The reservoir has now almost completely filled with sediment, rendering it nearly useless. The dam was notched to reduce its height twice in the late 20th century, in order to allow some of the accumulated sediment to flow downstream. It is currently slated for removal.

== See also ==
- Matilija Fire
- Rindge Dam, which Malibu Creek filled with sediment like Matilija Dam
- Riparian zone restoration
