= Ventura River Parkway Trail =

Rail trail in Ventura County, California, U.S.

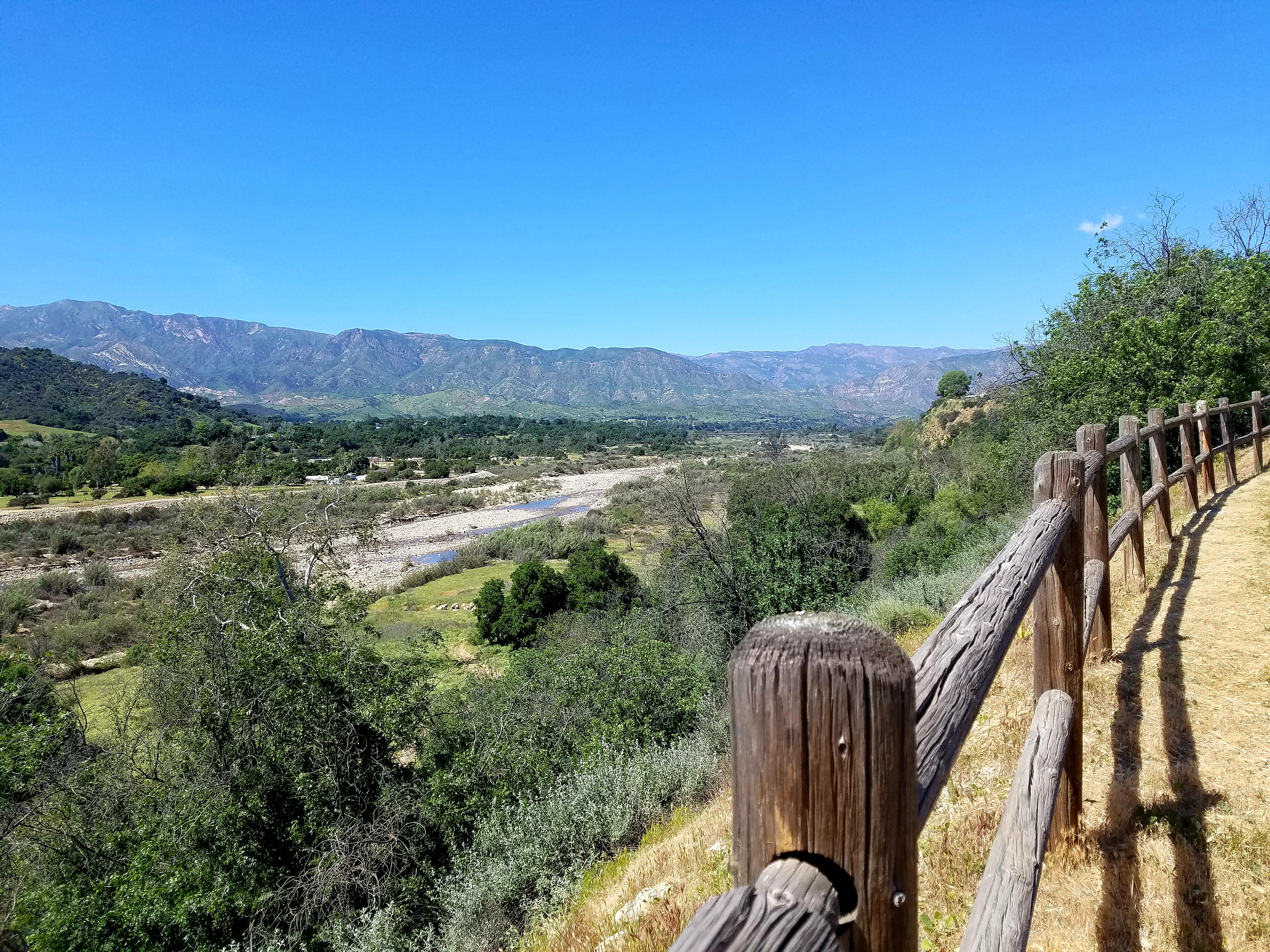

- Location within California
- Location: Ventura County, California, United States
- Nearest city: Ventura, California
- Coordinates: 34°21′1″N 119°18′5″W
- Established: 1987; 39 years ago
- Governing body: City of Ventura, County of Ventura
- Length: 16.5 miles (26.6 km)
- Use: cycling, pedestrians, equestrians (partial), on-leash pet walking
- Elevation change: 934 ft (285 m)
- Highest point: 969 ft (295 m)
- Lowest point: 35 ft (11 m)
- Grade: 2%
- Surface: asphalt concrete and unpaved

The Ventura River Parkway Trail is a southern California rail trail along the Ventura River in Ventura County. Roughly paralleling California State Route 33 for 16.5 mi (26.6 km) from Ventura to Ojai, it follows the route of the former Ventura and Ojai Valley Railroad that was abandoned between 1969 and 1995.

== Route ==
The southern end of the trail, known as the Ventura River Trail, follows the east side of the Ojai Freeway about 3 mi (4.8 km) through the industrialized Ventura Oil Field before crossing under the freeway adjacent to Crooked Palm Road. The trail then follows the west side of highway 33 another 3 mi (4.8 km) through the former Canet oil refinery and the Ventura water purification plant to Foster Park at the south edge of Casitas Springs. The trail known as the Ojai Valley Trail diverges from the highway along the west side of Casitas Springs into riparian woodlands following the east bank of the Ventura River as the highway climbs to Oak View. From 2 mi (3.2 km) of two percent uphill grade, the trail emerges from the woodlands along the west side of Oak View to rejoin the highway from a high fill across Devils Gulch overlooking the river. The trail closely follows the west side of highway 33 north of Oak View about 4 mi (6.4 km) until crossing the highway at the intersection with California State Route 150 into downtown Ojai. The northern end of the trail runs more than a mile easterly from the intersection through Ojai a few blocks south of highway 150.

== History ==
The Ventura River Parkway Trail was built on an abandoned railroad spur (CA_VEN-1109H) that was constructed by the Ventura and Ojai Valley Railroad in 1898 and acquired by Southern Pacific in 1899. The rail trail, that runs along the easterly bank of the river, was designated a National Recreation Trail in 2014. The "Ventura River Trail" part of the trail (completed in 1999) extends from the coast to Foster Park, and the "Ojai Valley Trail" part (completed in 1987) extends from Foster Park into the City of Ojai. The 15.8-mile trail (25.4 km), with the steady grade of the former Southern Pacific Railway right-of-way, is used by cyclists, walkers and horseback riders. As of 2015, the vision of a "Ventura River Parkway," a network of trails, vista points, and natural areas along the river, is being actively pursued by a coalition of stakeholders.

== Facilities ==
Most of the trail has asphalt concrete pavement for bicyclists, hikers, joggers, and dog-walkers using leashes. Some portions of the trail have a fence separating a parallel unpaved equestrian path. There are numerous public access points along the trail with parking lots in Foster Park on the south side of Casitas Springs and near the intersection of Main and Peking Streets in Ventura.

Parcels adjacent to the trail have been acquired by local land trusts.

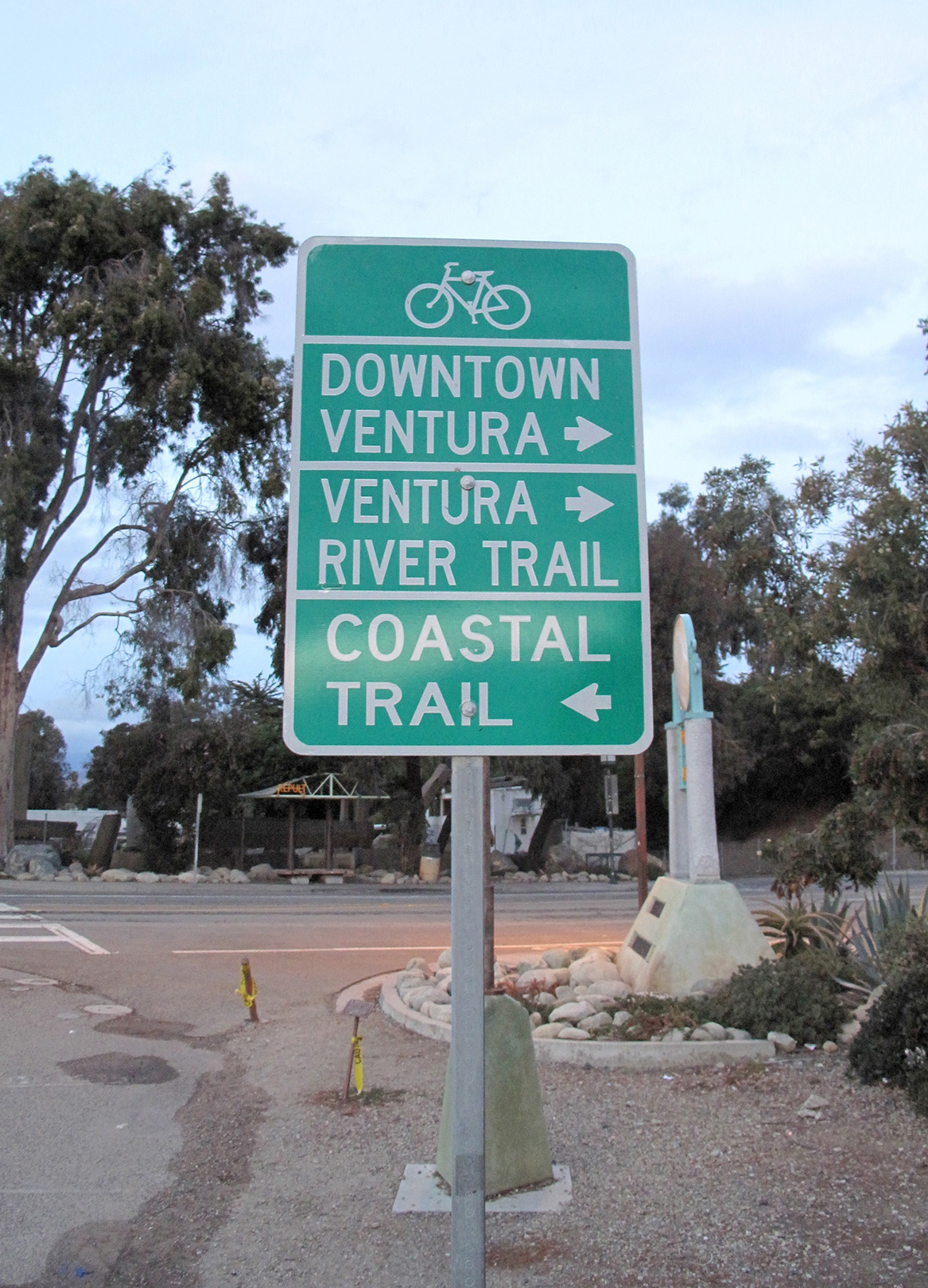
Directional sign at Main Street in Ventura

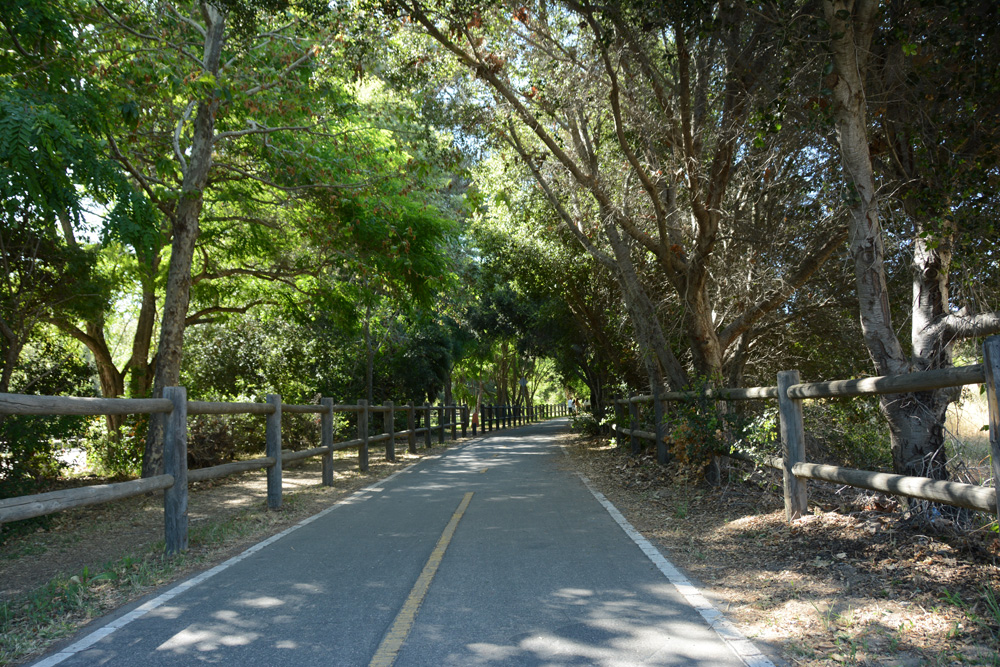
Trail through Foster Park has both the unpaved equestrian path on the left and paved bicycle path on the right

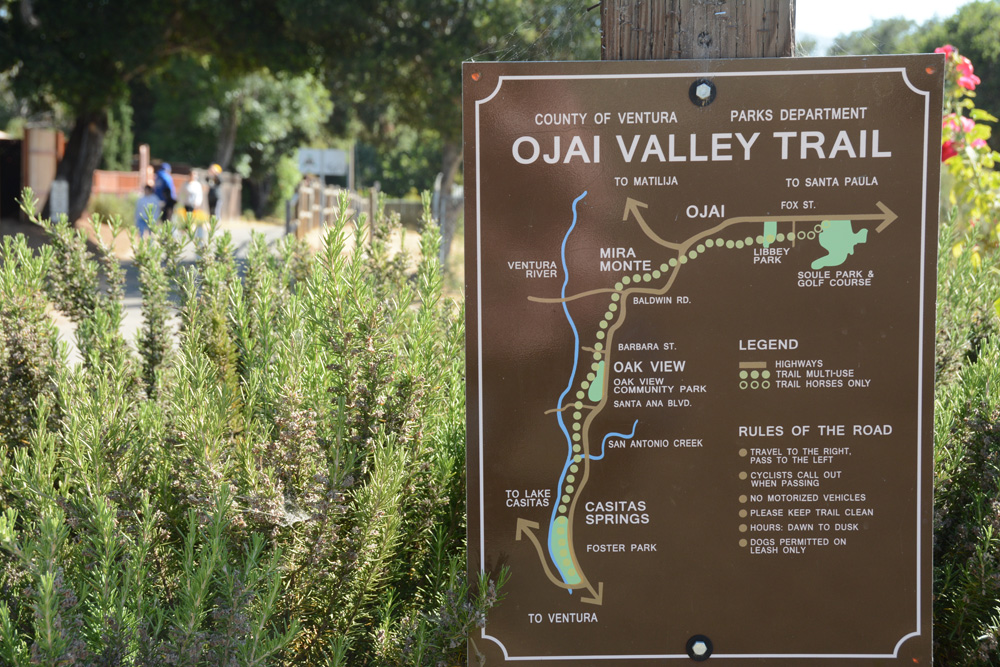
Trail sign map of the trail north of Foster Park

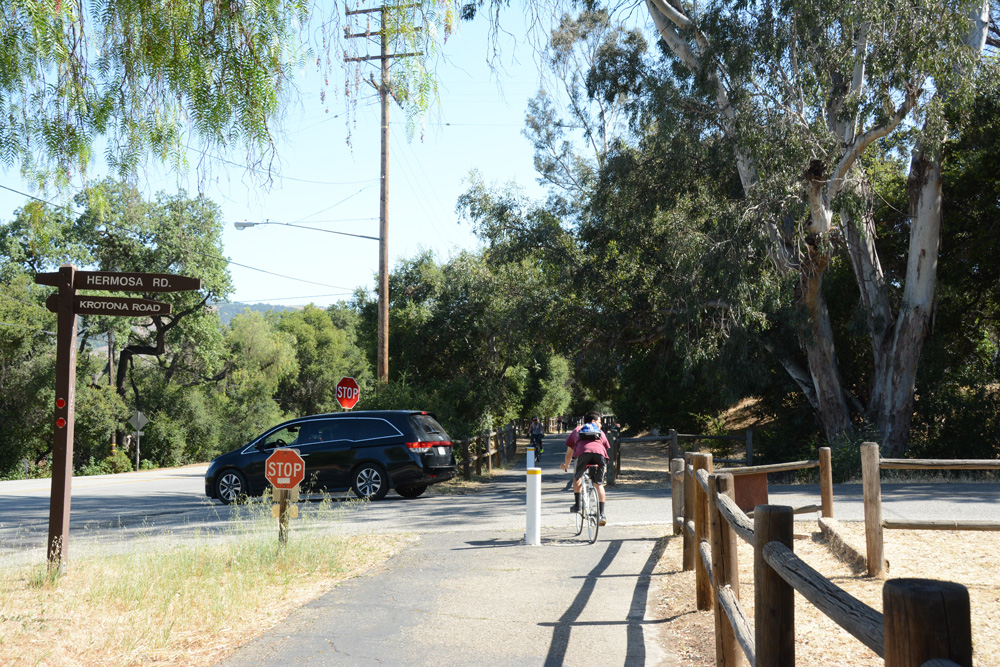
Trail crossing Hermosa Road illustrates typical trail proximity to highway 33 (on left) between Oak View and Ojai
