= Ventura River =

River in western Ventura County in southern California, United States

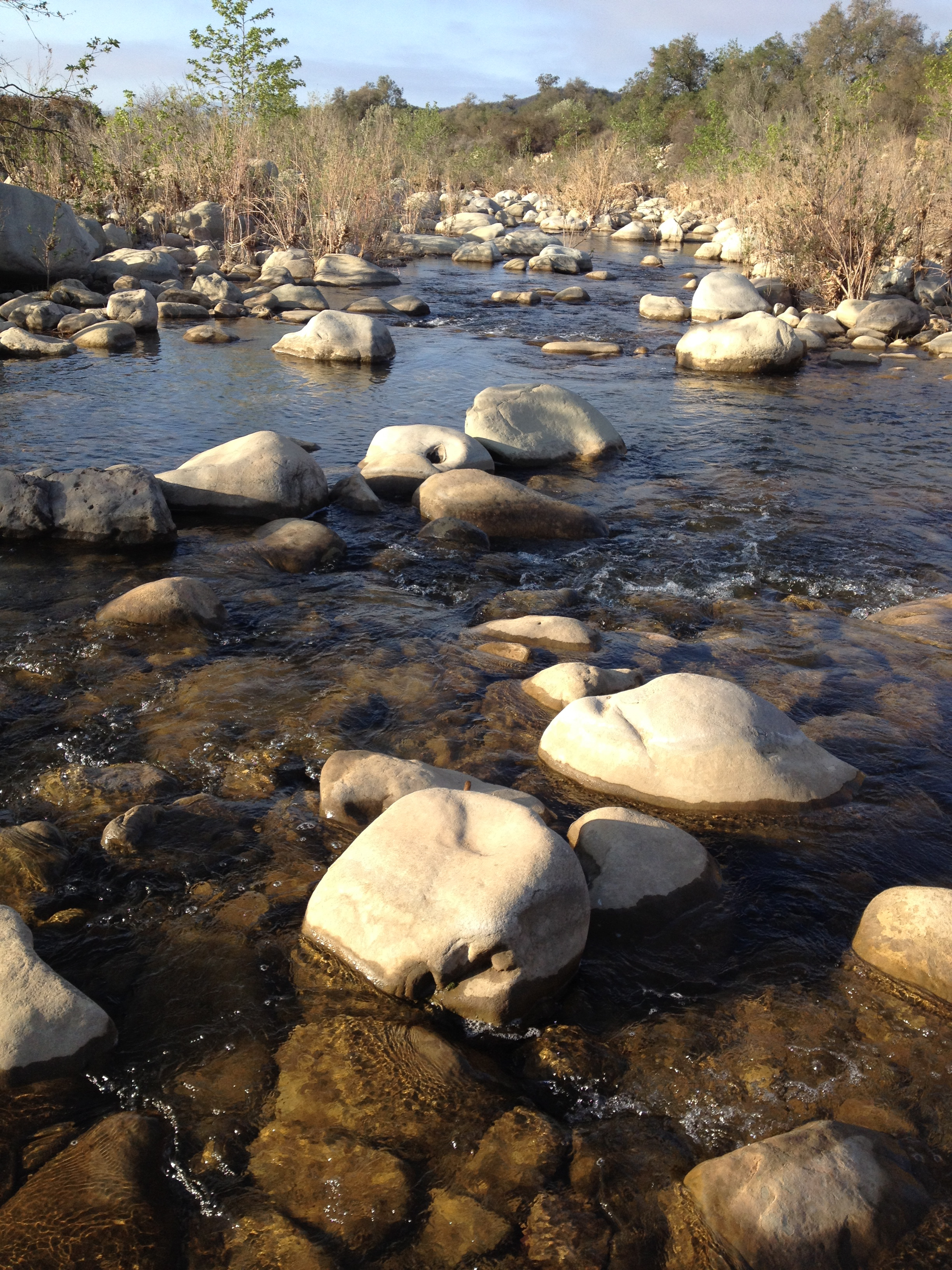
- Ventura River flowing through cobble near Meiners Oaks

Location
- Country: United States
- State: California

Physical characteristics
- Source: Transverse Ranges
  - location: Confluence of Matilija Creek and North Fork Matilija Creek, near Ojai
  - coordinates: 34°29′07″N 119°18′02″W
  - elevation: 6,010 ft (1,830 m)
- Mouth: Pacific Ocean
  - location: Ventura River Estuary, near Ventura
  - coordinates: 34°16′32″N 119°18′28″W
  - elevation: 0 ft (0 m)
- Length: 16.2 mi (26.1 km)
- Basin size: 226 mi^{2} (590 km^{2})
- Discharge
  - location: near Ventura
  - average: 72.6 cu ft/s (2.06 m^{3}/s)
  - minimum: 0 cu ft/s (0 m^{3}/s)
  - maximum: 63,600 cu ft/s (1,800 m^{3}/s)

Basin features
- Tributaries
  - left: San Antonio Creek, Cañada Larga Creek
  - right: Matilija Creek, North Fork Matilija Creek, Coyote Creek

The Ventura River is a river in western Ventura County in Southern California, United States, stretching 16.2 miles (26.1 km) from its headwaters in the Los Padres National Forest to the Pacific Ocean. The smallest of the three major rivers in Ventura County, it flows through the steeply sloped, narrow Ventura Valley, with its final 0.7 miles (1.1 km) through the broader Ventura River estuary, which extends from where it crosses under a 101 Freeway bridge through to the Pacific Ocean.

== Physical geography ==
=== Watershed ===
The Ventura River watershed encompasses 226 square miles (590 km^{2}), consisting of steep mountains and foothills, with altitudes ranging from 6,010 feet (1,830 m) to sea level. Valley floors are home to communities and farms. Conditions in much of the watershed remain natural and undeveloped, with 57% of its land area in protected status. Most of the watershed's primary streams and drainages are unchannelized, though the natural hydrologic patterns have been modified by two dams (the Casitas and Matilija) and three levees (the Ventura River, Casitas Springs, and Live Oak).

Developed land (excluding grazing) comprises only about 13% of the total land area in the watershed. The northern half of the watershed lies within Los Padres National Forest. The watershed's southern half has agriculture as the dominant land use, with irrigated citrus and avocados as the primary crops while a significant area of land is used for cattle grazing. The populated area includes two cities and a number of unincorporated communities. The smaller of the two cities, Ojai, lies entirely within the watershed, 13-mile inland (21 km) at an elevation of 746 feet (227 m). Only 13% of the larger city of Ventura lies within the watershed, adjacent to the coast on the lower stretch of the Ventura River.

The population of the watershed is relatively small and the rate of growth low. The population is approximately 44,140, which represents just 5.4% of Ventura County's population (as of 2010 Census). The population is 58% white, 37% Hispanic or Latino, 2% Asian, and 3% other races. Income varies widely, and several areas qualify as disadvantaged or severely disadvantaged communities.

=== Course ===
The river flows 16.2 miles (26.1 km) from its headwaters through to the Pacific Ocean. The smallest of the three major rivers in Ventura County, the Ventura River's source stream is Matilija Creek, from its confluence with North Fork Matilija Creek. Matilija Creek is Ventura River's highest volume tributary, followed by San Antonio Creek, which joins the Ventura River from the east halfway to the ocean; Coyote Creek enters the river from the west about 7 miles (11 km) from the river mouth and Cañada Larga Creek from the east a few miles downstream. Much of the Ventura River's route is contained by the steeply sloped sides of the narrow Ventura Valley, with its final 0.7 miles (1.1 km) through the broader Ventura River estuary, which extends from where it crosses under a 101 Freeway bridge through to the Pacific Ocean.

=== Climate ===
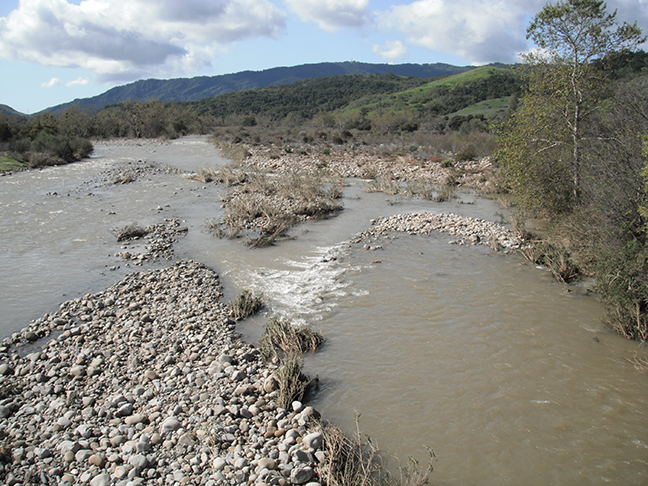
Ventura River downstream of Santa Ana Bridge, 2011

Water from the Ventura River is transported in the Robles Canal to Lake Casitas, an off-river reservoir

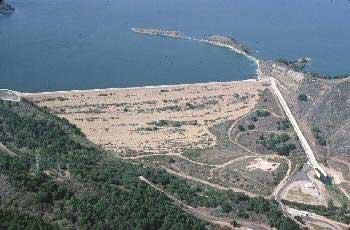
Casitas Dam

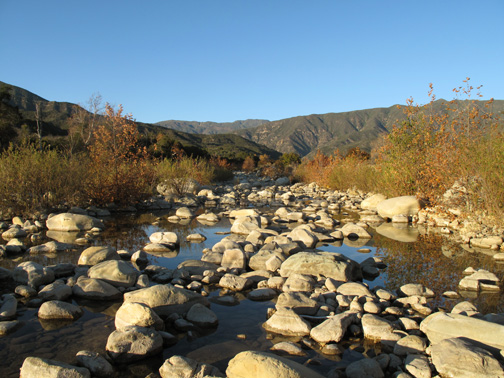
Ventura River on the Ventura River Preserve

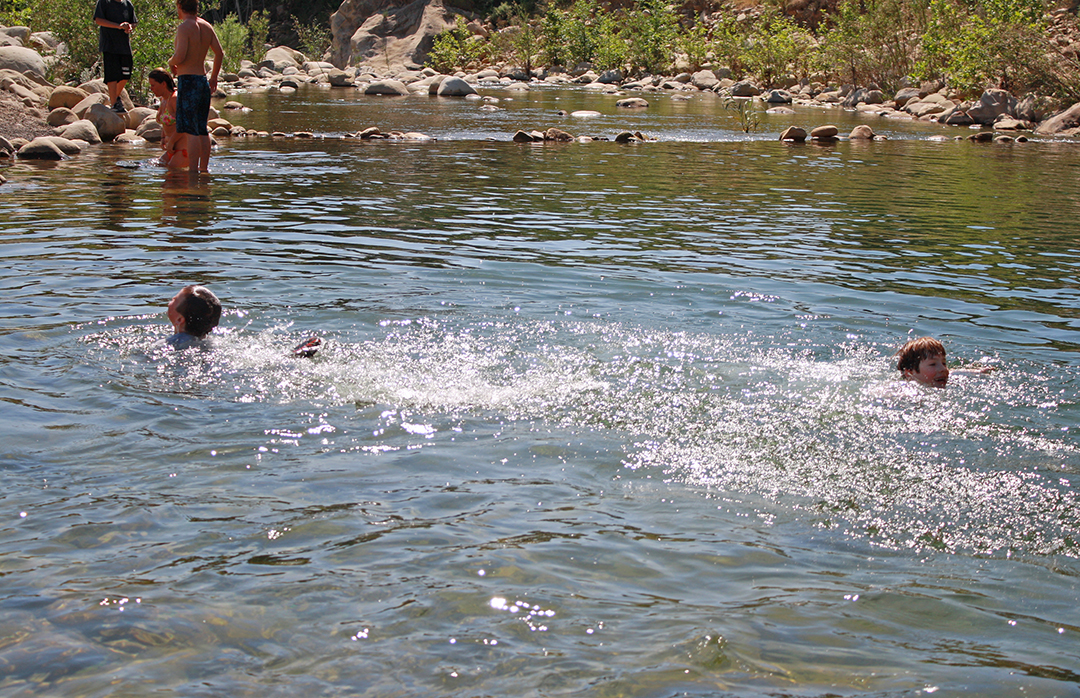
Swimming Hole, Ventura River Preserve

Rainfall varies geographically, seasonally, and from year to year. Median annual precipitation is 14.12 inches or 359 millimetres in the lower watershed, 19.20 inches or 488 millimetres in the middle watershed, and 28.74 inches or 730 millimetres in the upper watershed. However, even in the subhumid upper basin, rainfall is infrequent – falling on as few days in a year as in hot, arid Phoenix, Arizona – but when rain does fall it can be extremely heavy with totals of 20 inches or 510 millimetres in a week not uncommon in the middle and upper basins. Consequently, cycles of drought and flood are the norm: as an illustration, in the main settlement of Ojai since 1906, 67 percent of the years have had less than the mean rainfall.

Many parts of the Ventura River stream network are typically dry during much of the year. Surface water readily disappears underground in some stream reaches (segments); in others, groundwater regularly feeds streamflow.

== Ecology ==
The watershed's rugged topography, largely undeveloped status, and Mediterranean climate combine to make for an area of exceptional biodiversity. It supports a diverse array of natural habitats, including grassland, coastal sage scrub, chaparral, oak woodlands and savannas; coniferous woodlands; riparian scrub, woodlands and wetlands; alluvial scrub; freshwater aquatic habitats; estuarine wetlands; and coastal cobble, dune and intertidal habitats. The Ventura River estuary, at the mouth of the Ventura River, is an exceptionally valuable wetland habitat and ecological resource in the watershed.

The watershed is home to numerous protected species and habitats, including 137 plants and animals protected at either the federal, state, or local level. The federally endangered southern California steelhead (listed in 1997) is of particular importance, given the watershed's often dry and always variable climate. The steelhead found in the Ventura River are part of the Southern California Steelhead Distinct Population Segment (DPS) were listed as federally endangered. Genetic analysis of the steelhead trout (Oncorhynchus mykiss) in the Ventura river watershed (both above and below Matilija Dam) has shown them to be of native and not hatchery stocks.

=== Invasive species ===
The watershed is challenged by invasive, non-native plants, such as giant reeds, ice plants and castor bean, which choke out the willows and estuary-area salt marsh which normally support the native fauna. Plans and projects have been underway since the 1990s to restore natural features, flora and fauna to the river.

=== Water Quality ===
Limited land development and large areas of protected habitat in the watershed help support surface water that is relatively clean compared with more developed areas in the region. However, all of the watershed major waterbodies are on the Clean Water Act Section 303(d) list of impaired waterbodies. Surface waters are impaired for a number of factors, including trash, algae, water diversion/pumping, eutrophic conditions, low dissolved oxygen, nitrogen, fish barriers, coliform, bacteria, mercury, and total dissolved solids.

The estuary has been on the Clean Water Act 303(d) list for trash impairment for 10+ years. In 2008 the Los Angeles Regional Water Quality Control Board adopted the Ventura River Estuary Trash Total Maximum Daily Load (TMDL) to address the impairment and establish time schedule orders to improve water quality in this segment of the watershed.

The installation of stormwater treatment devices for the Ventura Freeway crossing was included in funding from the 2021 federal Infrastructure Investment and Jobs Act.

== History ==
A USA Petrochem petroleum refinery, situated within the 100-year floodplain of the river, was shut down in 1985. In August 2012 the Environmental Protection Agency (EPA) determined there had been discharge to navigable waters of the United States in violation of the Clean Water Act. The EPA's site assessment found that there were numerous leaking pipelines, leaking tanks and leaking production vessels throughout the abandoned property. The site was also out of compliance with Los Angeles Water Quality Control Board's Ventura River Estuary Trash Total Maximum Daily Load. The EPA issued an order that the site must be cleaned up or daily fines would be sought from the owner. In 2015, the site owner agreed to remove all machinery and equipment, which would complete the cleanup of the plant.

=== Flooding ===
Rainfall in the Matilija Wilderness, the river's headwaters, is the highest in Ventura County, with average annual rainfall that is over twice that of rainfall at the coast. The steep terrain of the Ventura River watershed, coupled with intense downpours that can occur in its upper portions, result in flash flood conditions where floodwaters rise and fall in a matter of hours. Major or moderate floods have occurred once every five years on average since 1933.

The most damaging flood recorded in the Ventura River watershed occurred in 1969. The watershed above Ojai received 43 inches (1,100 mm) of rain in nine days in January. The floodwaters and associated debris flooded homes in Casitas Springs and Live Oak Acres. Much agricultural land, primarily citrus groves, was seriously damaged or destroyed. All over Ventura County, transportation facilities, including roads, bridges, and railroad tracks, were damaged. The wastewater treatment plant below Foster Park was severely damaged and dumped raw sewage into the Ventura River. In addition, sewer trunk lines were broken along the Ventura River and San Antonio Creek. Untreated sewage polluted the river and beach. The capacity of the Matilija reservoir was significantly reduced by siltation from the flood.

== Modifications ==
=== Water Supply ===
Unlike almost all of its neighbors in southern California, Ventura River watershed is 100% dependent on local water supplies. Lake Casitas serves as the major surface water supply reservoir in the watershed and groundwater is heavily relied upon. On average, surface water comprises about 55% of the water recovered from the watershed and groundwater comprises about 45%.

Cycles of drought and flooding occur regularly. Annual rainfall in downtown Ojai has ranged from a low of seven inches to a high of 49 inches—a sevenfold variation. Because the annual amount of rainfall received is highly variable, water supplies must be managed with caution.

Two small coastal watersheds—the North Ventura Coastal Streams watershed and the Buenaventura watershed—flank the Ventura River watershed's lower section and are dependent on its water. Water from the Ventura River watershed is used to irrigate avocado orchards in the North Ventura Coastal Streams watershed and serves a significant population within the City of Ventura.

==== Legal actions ====
Santa Barbara Channelkeeper filed a lawsuit in 2014 alleging the city of Ventura was taking too much water from the river, hurting habitat for steelhead trout and other wildlife. The city filed a cross-complaint in response to bring in other users of the river, including the Casitas Municipal Water District. Mediation talks began among major users of the Ventura River.

=== Sewer system ===
The Ojai Valley Sanitary District collection system operates within the watershed.

=== Dams ===
Matilija Dam

The flow of the Ventura River and its tributary Coyote Creek have been reduced by the completion of Casitas Dam, which forms Casitas Reservoir. The dam is on Coyote Creek about 2 miles upstream of the junction with the Ventura River. The Robles Diversion Dam was constructed on the Ventura River in 1958 to divert up to 107,800 acre-feet of water per year through a four-and-a-half mile canal to Casitas Reservoir. About 40% of the total water in Lake Casitas is supplied from high winter flows in the Ventura River. Casitas Municipal Water District sells water to both domestic and agricultural customers.

The Matilija Creek, source stream and main tributary of the Ventura River, is controlled by the Matilija Dam. Completed in 1948, it was built to store 7,000 acre-feet (8,600,000 m^{3}) of water, but sediment has reduced its capacity by 90%. The Matilija Dam was built by Ventura County, against the advice of the United States Army Corps of Engineers, who pointed out that the characteristics of waterways in the region would lead to sediment buildup, rendering the dam ineffective and dangerous.

A major project underway to remove the Matilija Dam, in part to return access to the steelhead to spawning habitat while also enhancing the overall watershed. Since 1998, efforts to remove the dam have received regulatory approvals but little funding, with one ceremonial section last removed in 2001.

== Management ==
The river bottom and adjacent land is protected by the Ojai Valley Land Conservancy (OVLC), the Ventura Land Trust, Ventura County Watershed Protection District, Ventura County Parks, and the City of Ventura. The Ventura River Preserve, owned by the OVLC, protects 1,600 acres (650 ha) of land in and adjacent to the river, including 3 miles (4.8 km) of the river.

The Ventura River Watershed Council, which includes government agencies, nonprofit groups, businesses, community groups, and individuals, prepared a watershed management plan. Approved in 2015, this comprehensive plan proposed ways to improve the health and sustainability of the watershed.

Camping in the Ventura River bottom, which is dry most of the year, was outlawed by the Ventura City Council in 1995 after floods killed one man and prompted the evacuation of 12 other people near the Main Street bridge.

== Recreation ==
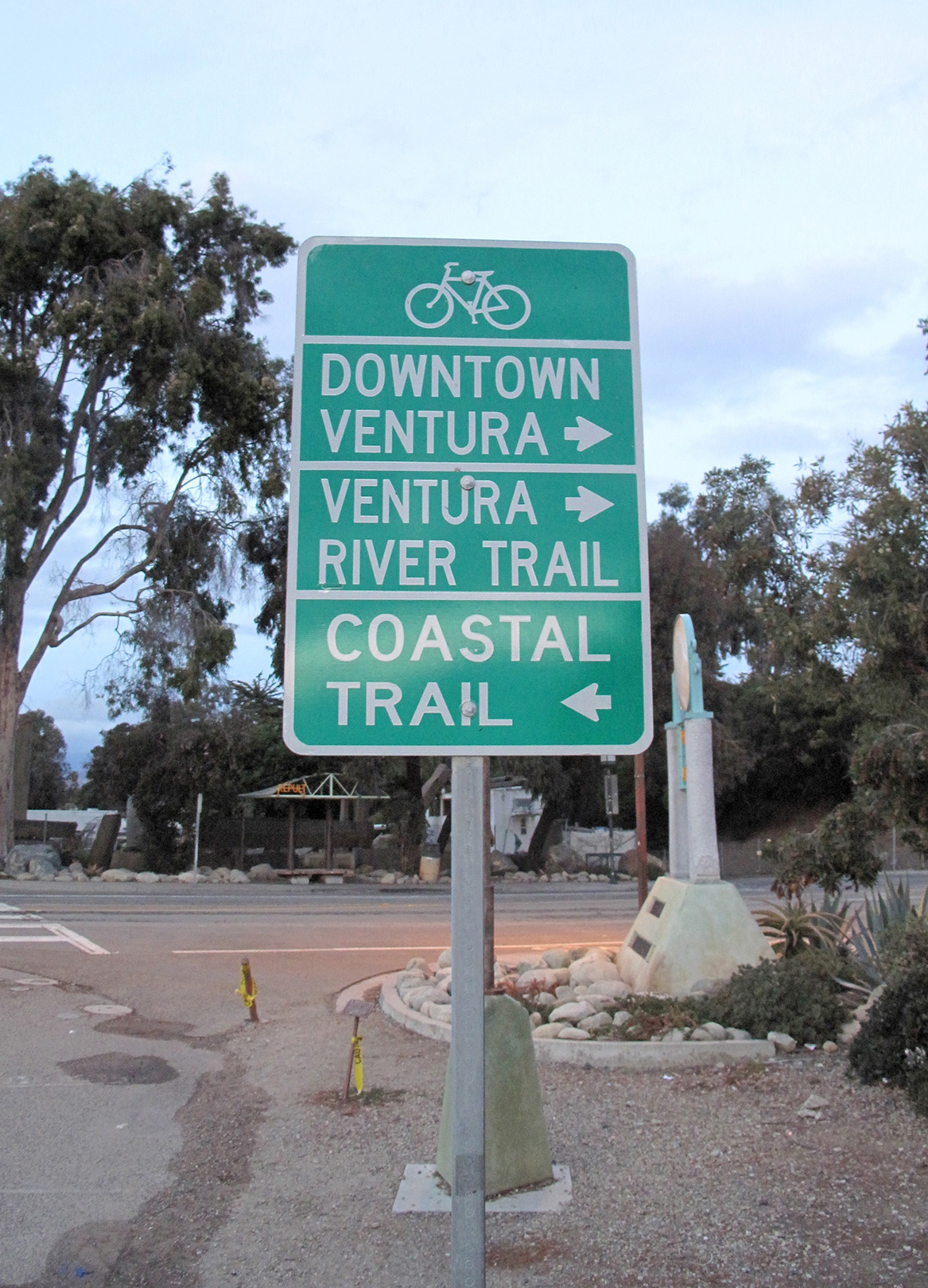
Ventura River Parkway Trail sign

The Ventura River Parkway Trail was built on an abandoned railroad spur (CA_VEN-1109H) that was constructed by the Ventura and Ojai Valley Railroad in 1898 and acquired by Southern Pacific in 1899. The rail trail, that runs along the easterly bank of the river, was designated a National Recreation Trail in 2014. The "Ventura River Trail" part of the trail (completed in 1999) extends from the coast to Foster Park, and the "Ojai Valley Trail" part (completed in 1987) extends from Foster Park into the City of Ojai. The 15.8-mile trail (25.4 km), with the steady grade of the former Southern Pacific Railway right-of-way, is very popular with bicyclists, as well as walkers and horseback riders (on the Ojai Valley Trail segment). As of 2015, the vision of a "Ventura River Parkway," a network of trails, vista points, and natural areas along the river, is being actively pursued by a coalition of stakeholders.

State Route 33 also roughly parallels the river through the Ventura River Valley. A portion of SR 33, north of the SR 150, is officially designated as a state scenic highway, and the entire Ventura River Valley section is eligible for the designation.

The watershed is a recreation destination for hikers, walkers, bikers, surfers, campers, fishermen, boaters, backpackers, equestrians, and birders, as well as artists, spiritual seekers, and students of natural history. Many local organizations are committed to providing the public with access to nature and nature-based recreation opportunities.

== See also ==
- Riparian zone restoration
- List of rivers of California
- San Buenaventura Mission Aqueduct
