= Matilija Hot Springs =

Thermal springs and former resort

- Ojai Hot Springs
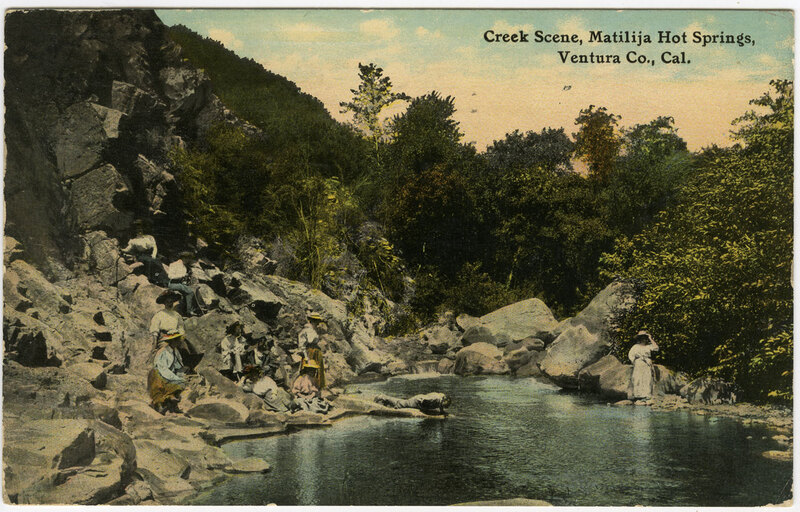
- Creek Scene, Matilija Hot Springs, 1911
- Interactive map of Matilija Hot Springs
- Location: Los Padres National Forest, Ventura County, near the town of Ojai
- Coordinates: 34°29′33″N 119°18′20″W
- Elevation: 1,142 ft
- Type: geothermal
- Temperature: 100 °F (38 °C)

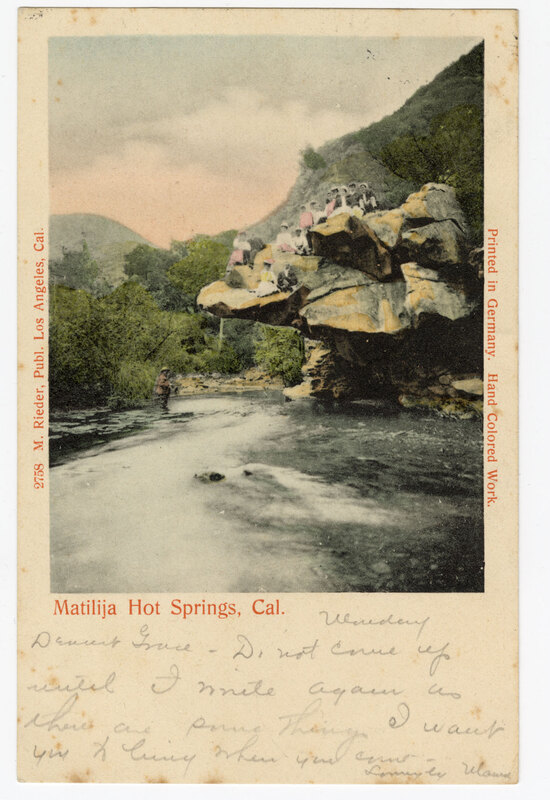
Matilija Hot Springs, California 1905

Matilija Hot Springs is a thermal spring system of 22 hot and cold springs, and is a former resort located northwest of the town of Ojai, California. The site was designated a Ventura County Historical Landmark (#25) in 1972.

== History ==
Indigenous peoples in the area may have used the hot mineral springs before European and American settlers arrived. A historic resort operated at the hot springs site in the 19th and 20th centuries. The hot and cold springs are found within the 9-acre area, which is a Ventura County historical landmark. The Matilija spring was about 6 miles (9.7 km) northwest of Nordhoff depot (Nordhoff was later known as Ojai), and about 2.5 miles (4.0 km) south of Vickers Hot Springs. Lyon Spring was located about a mile to the northwest.

The settlement included a post office and a historical swimming pool and nineteen other structures. Remains of the settlement were demolished in late-2019 following the Thomas Fire that occurred in 2017.

In 1871 J. W. Wilcox visited the area and soaked in the springs to rehabilitate from an injury he received in the Mexican-American War. A hotel and cabins were constructed in 1873. Two years later the property was purchased by R.M Brown who developed it into a resort with a 20-room hotel and six cabins. In 1877 the property was sold to a Captain Gardener who named the springs Matilija. In 1881 a Mr. Wilcoxen purchased the springs from Gardener and used the site as a private home for the convalescence of his grandson, Arnold Carver. Later, Wilcoxen opened the site to visitors.

In 1884, these structures were ruined in a flood. The following year a new hotel, cabins, a bathhouse, horse stables, and camping area was built by A. W. Blumberg. The redeveloped hot springs resort could accommodate 100 people (not including campers.)

In 1889, the Matilija post office was built, it remained in use until 1916. In 1901, the 80-acre resort and 320 additional acres were purchased by S.P. Creasinger, a real estate developer. By 1904, the property was in bankruptcy, and was purchased by Sim Myers. Myers lost many of the resort buildings due to another flood. As of 1908 there were accommodations for 200 people. In 1920, Joe Linnel purchased the property, then in 1938 it was sold again to G.E. Mann. In 1924, "The Plunge" building and the swimming pool it housed were burned in a wildfire. The pool water was piped directly from the hot sulfur springs. The Plunge also contained three bowling alleys and 76 dressing rooms.

From 1941 to 1949, the resort was leased to Ray Robertson and his wife, who successfully managed the operation. During the time the Robertson's ran the resort, the property was sold to the Ventura County Flood Control District in 1946. Bill Olivas then leased the spa resort, however another flood in 1969 damaged the buildings and swimming pool. In 1988 the property was sold by the county to a man from Santa Barbara, who closed the springs to public access.

In 2017, the Thomas wildfire devastated nearly 300,000 acres in the area, including burning the hot springs structures.

== Water profile ==
The mineral spring water is high in sulfur, and the associated "rotten egg" smell is due to the presence of hydrogen sulfide gas. According to a report published 1915 by the U.S. Geological Survey, there were four springs on the site, called Hot Sulphur Spring, Fountain of Life, Mother Eve, and Lithia. The water of Hot Sulphur Spring had a reported maximum temperature of 116 °F (47 °C). Fountain of Life and Mother Eve were warm springs that yielded a flow of about 1 U.S. gallon (3.8 L; 0.83 imp gal) per minute. The water of Lithia was notably alkaline.

== Gallery ==
Matilija Hot Springs
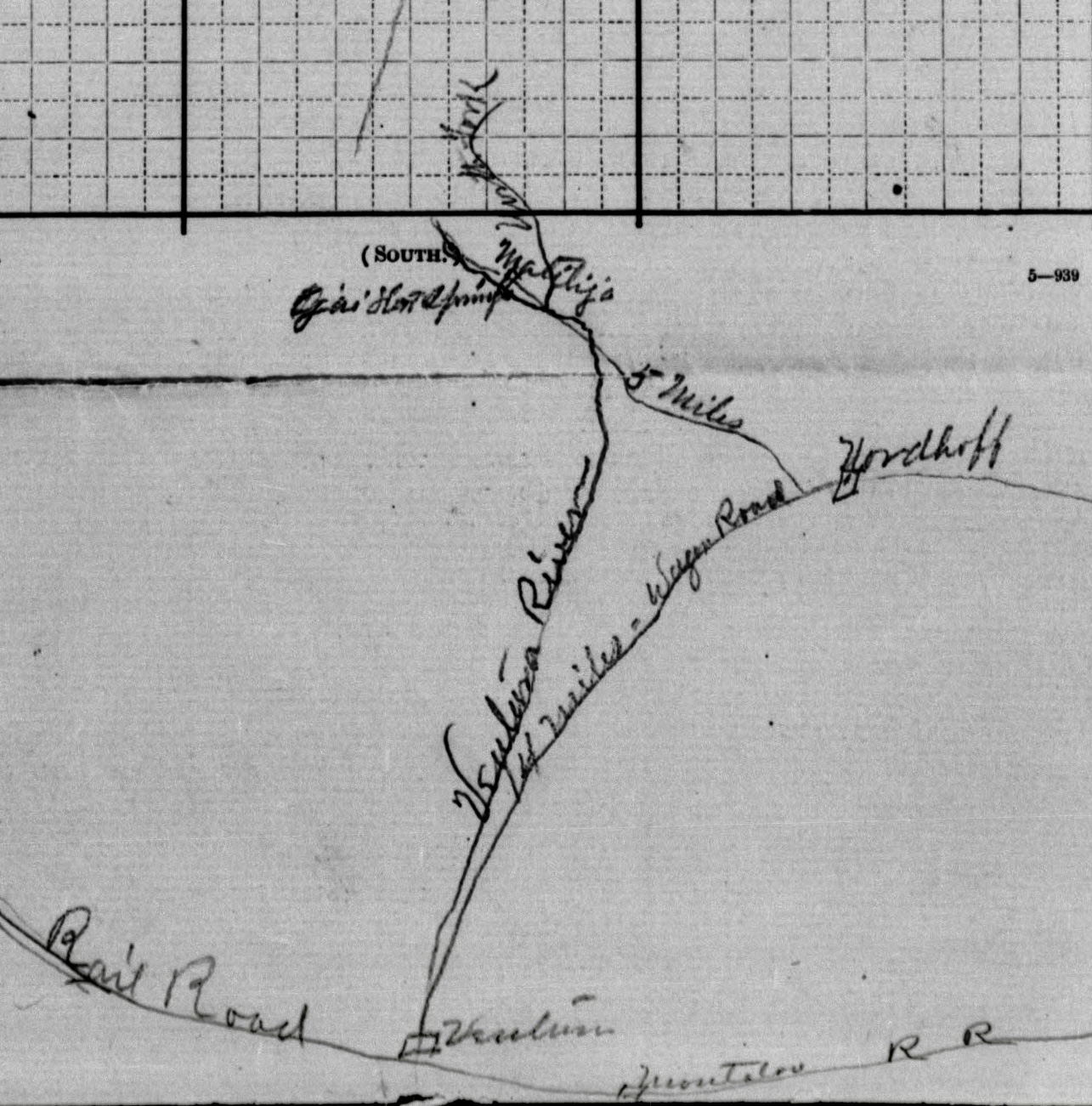
1889 map attached to application for a post office at Matilija, Ventura County, California

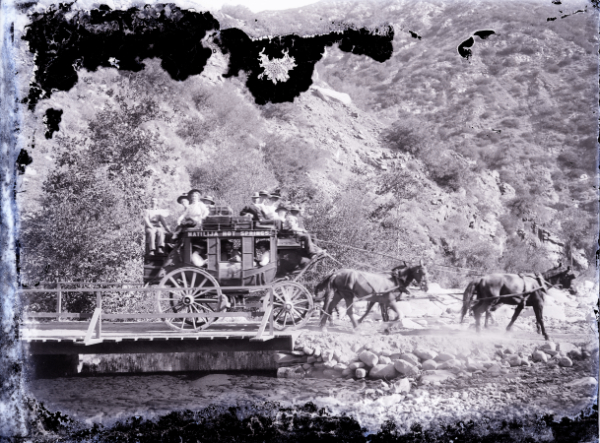
Matilija Hot Springs stagecoach crossing a bridge (Ventura Co. Museum gp196)

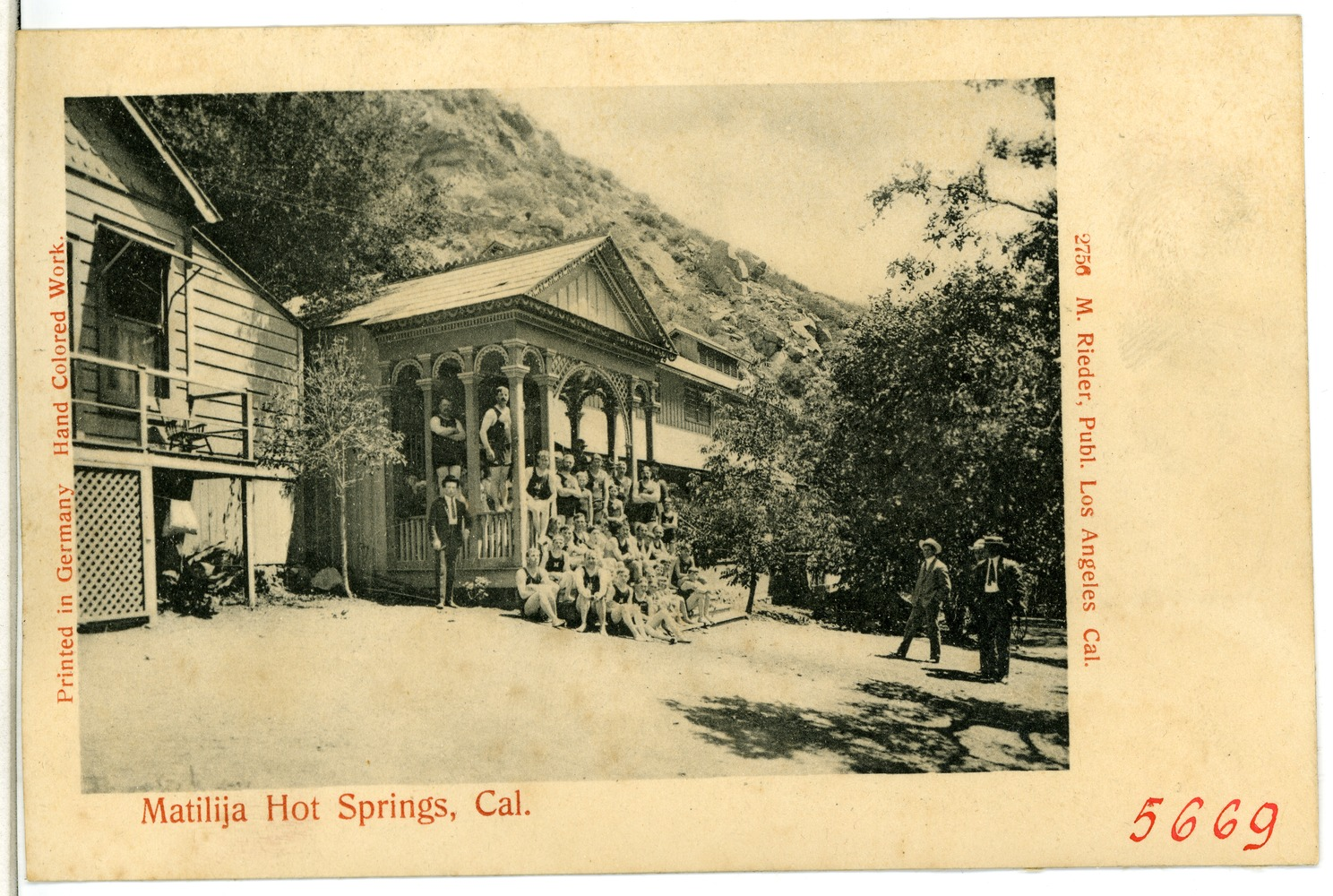
Matilija Hot Springs, California, 1905

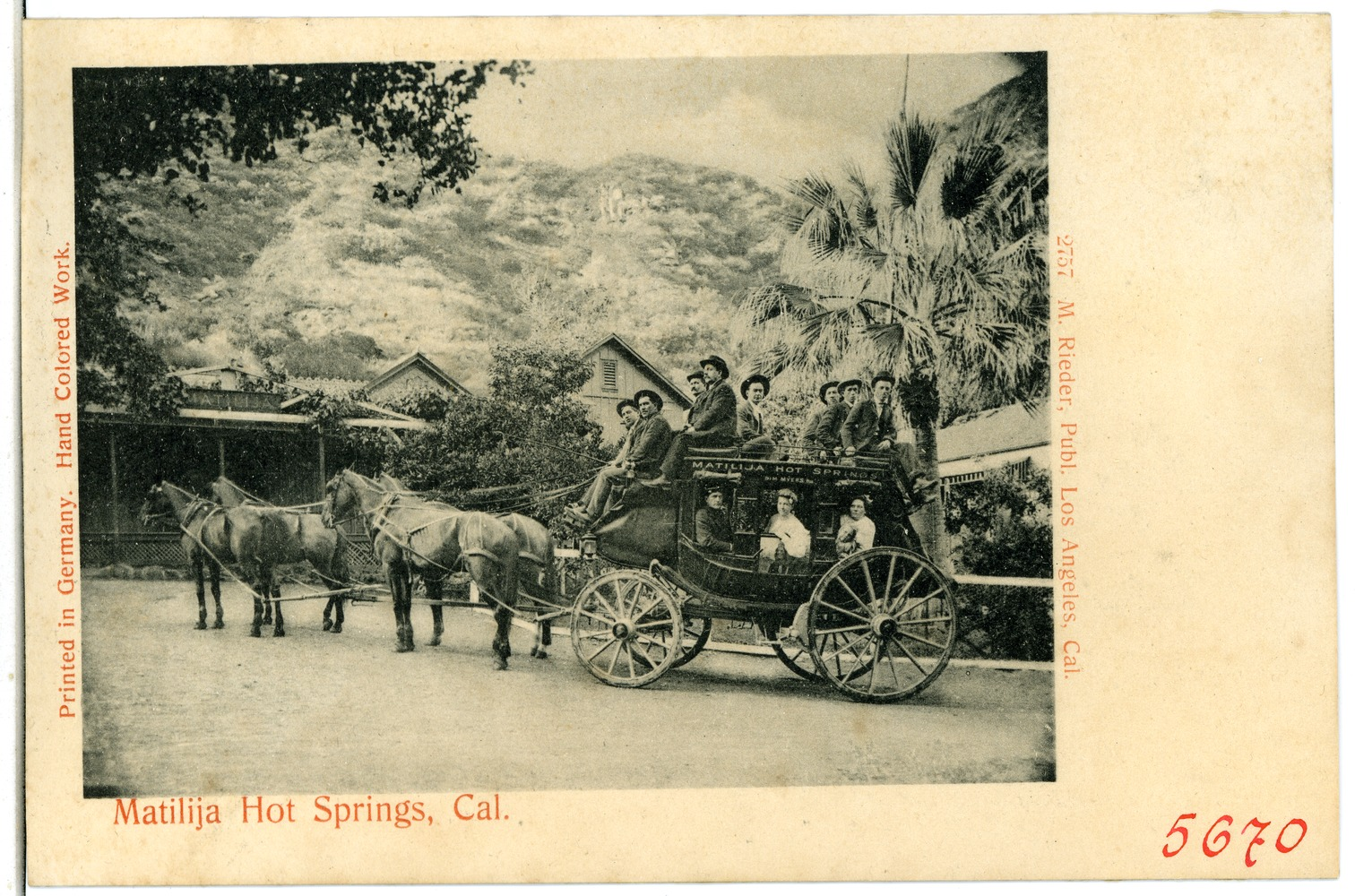
Matilija Hot Springs, 1905

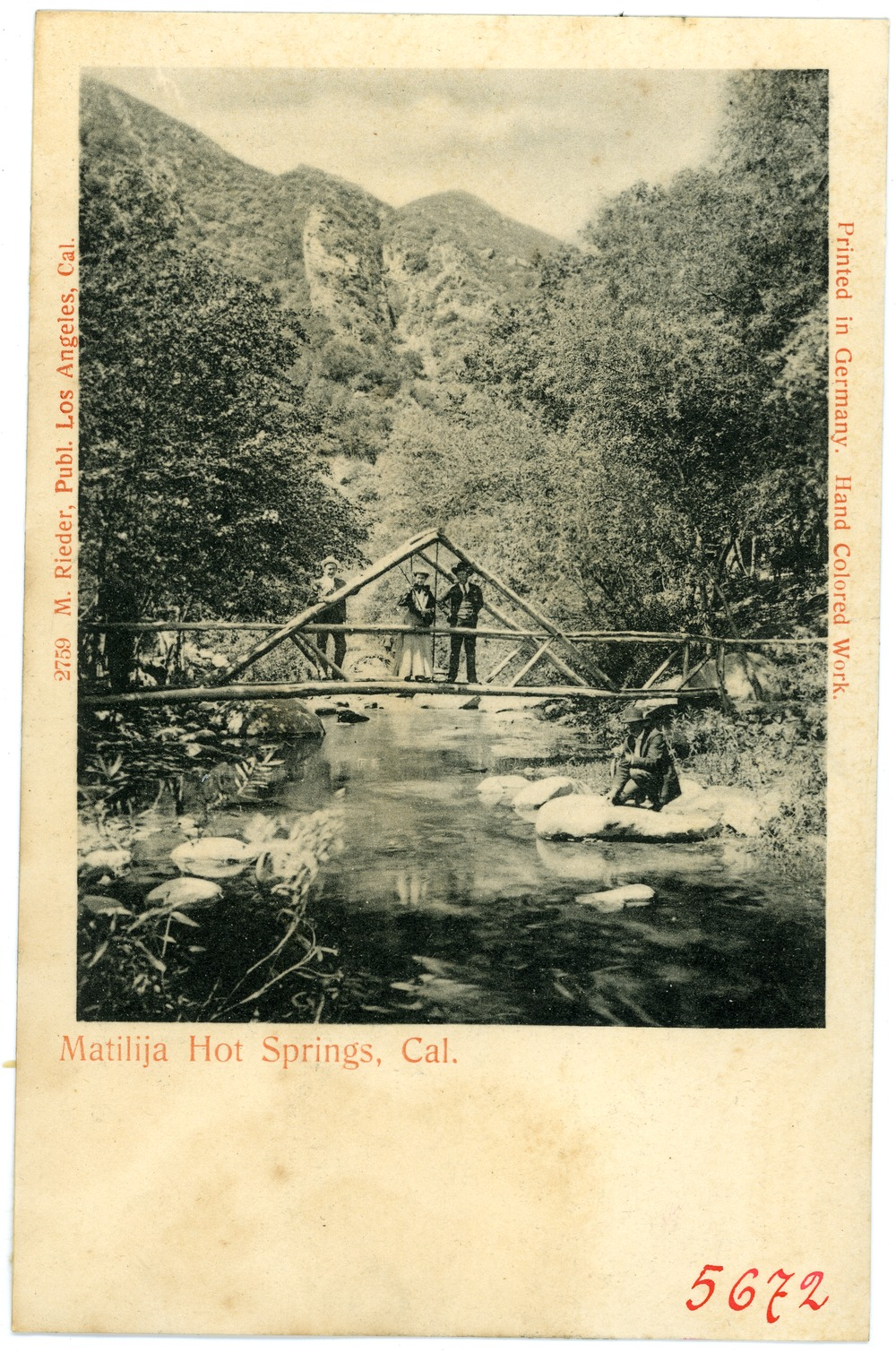
Matilija Hot Springs, 1905

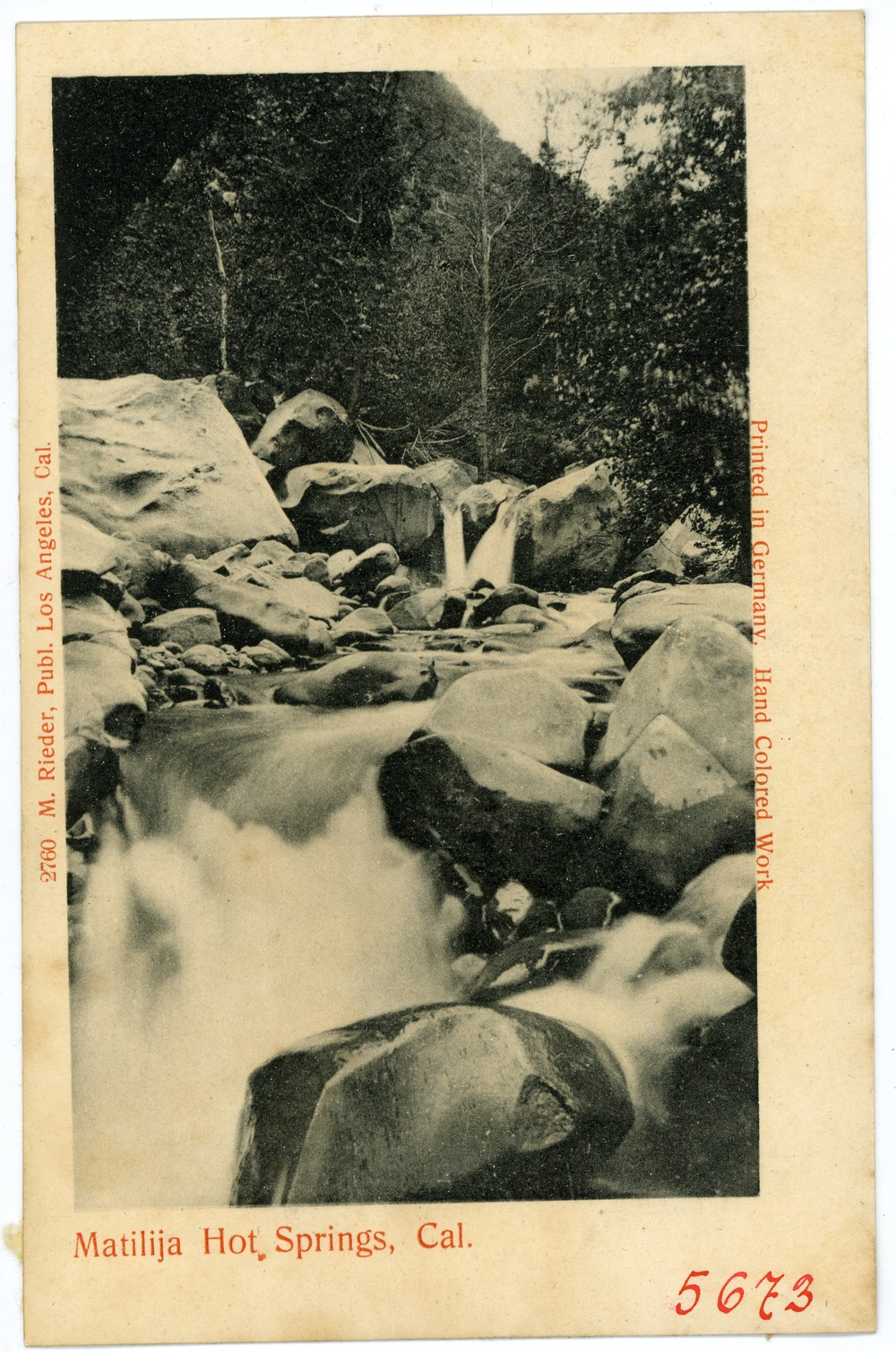
Matilija Hot Springs, 1905

== See also ==
- Matilija Creek
- Matilija Wilderness
- Matilija Sandstone
- List of hot springs in the United States
- Sespe Hot Springs
