= Lake Casitas =

Reservoir in Ventura County, California

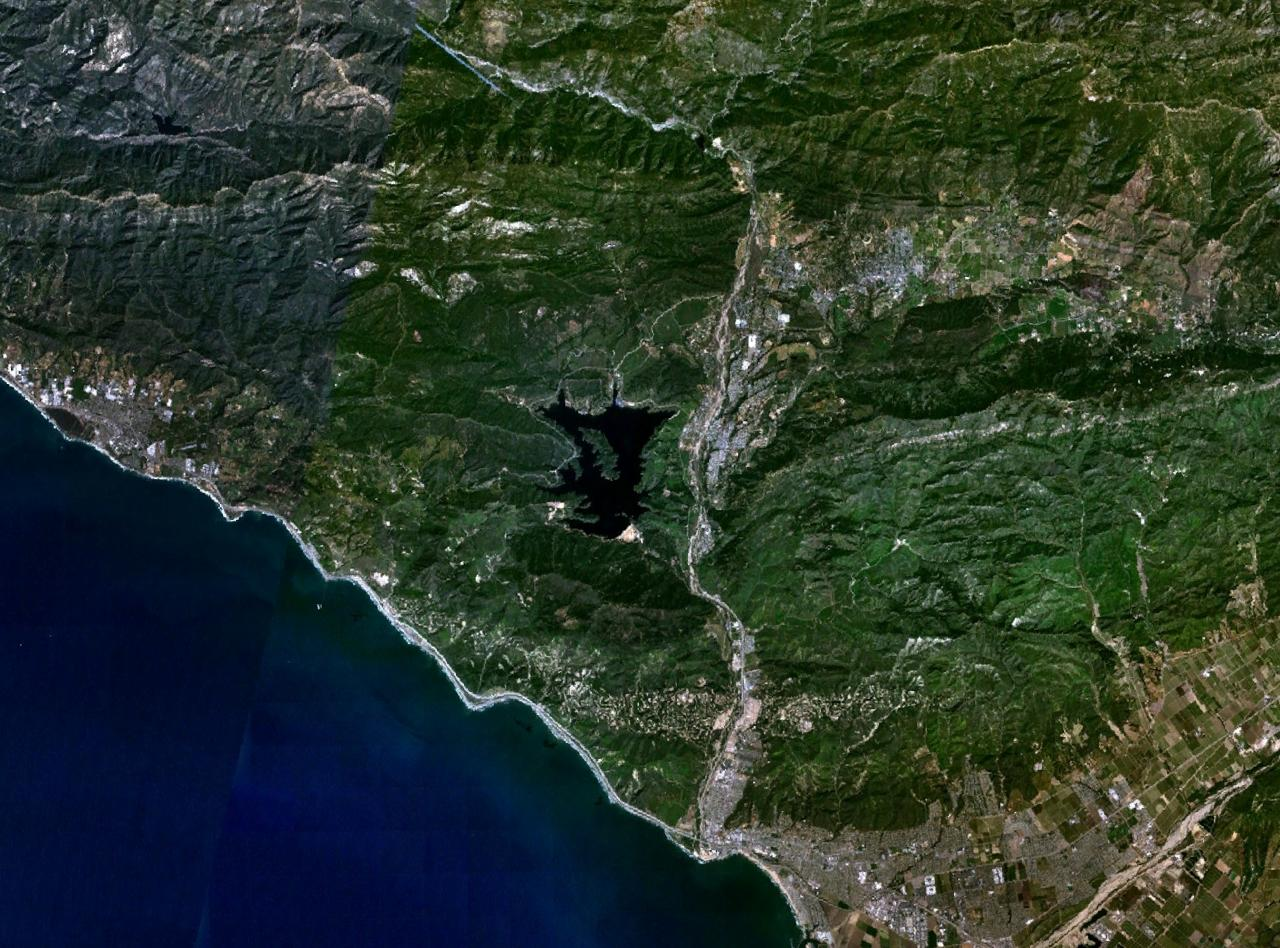

- Location within California Location within the United States
- Location: Ventura County, California, U.S.
- Coordinates: 34.3924°N 119.3346°W
- Lake type: Reservoir
- Primary inflows: Coyote Creek; Santa Ana Creek
- Primary outflows: Coyote Creek
- Catchment area: 39 sq mi (100 km^{2})
- Basin countries: United States
- Managing agency: Casitas Municipal Water District
- Max. length: 3.3 mi (5.3 km)
- Max. width: 1.9 mi (3 km)
- Surface area: 1,100 acres (450 ha)
- Max. depth: 240 feet (73 m)
- Water volume: 254,000 acre⋅ft (313,000,000 m^{3})
- Shore length^{1}: 32.4 miles (52.1 km)
- Surface elevation: 338 ft (103 m)
- Settlements: Oak View, Ojai
- References: U.S. Geological Survey Geographic Names Information System: Lake Casitas
- ^{1} Shore length is not a well-defined measure.

Lake Casitas is a reservoir in Ventura County, California, built by the United States Bureau of Reclamation and completed in 1959. The project provides drinking water and water for irrigation. A secondary benefit is flood control. It was the venue for canoeing and rowing at the 1984 Summer Olympics.

Casitas Dam was constructed on Coyote Creek, two miles (3 km) before it joins the Ventura River. Santa Ana Creek and North Fork Coyote Creek also flow into the lake. The system was designed for water from the Ventura River to be diverted into a canal under specific conditions since the impounded watershed is not sufficient to fill the lake. The dam is 279 ft (85 m) creating a lake capacity of 254,000 acre⋅ft (313,000,000 m^{3}). The dam was built as part of the Ventura River Project.

== History ==
The lake filled for the first time around the 1970s. The spillway was first used in 1978. As of 2024, it has operated eight times.

During the 1984 Summer Olympics in Los Angeles, Lake Casitas hosted the canoeing and rowing events.

The Thomas Fire at the end of 2017 had a significant impact on operations since the wildfire burned a large area within the watershed of the Ventura River. Rainstorms brought a lot of ash, sandy silt, gravel, and debris into the Robles diversion facility that had collected over several years since the fire resulting in some temporary shutdowns of water from the Ventura River.

== Operations ==
The Robles Diversion Dam was constructed on the Ventura River in 1958 to divert up to 107,800 acre-feet (133,000,000 cubic meters) of water per year through a 4.5-mile (7.2 km) canal to the reservoir. About 30 to 40% of the total water in Lake Casitas is supplied from high winter flows in the Ventura River.

The Casitas Municipal Water District provides drinking water from the lake to the Ojai Valley, parts of Ventura, and the Rincon coast north of Ventura. They took over management of the Ojai water system by purchase of the franchise from Golden State Water Company in April 2017 after an overwhelming vote in favor.

=== Regulations ===
Human contact with the water is prohibited by the Board of Directors at the Casitas Municipal Water District. The board states that since the Lake is used for drinking water, body contact with water is not allowed, but fishing, boating, rowing and camping are permitted.

The "no body contact with water" lake policy was established by The Casitas Municipal Water District in the 1950s and 1960s because the lake did not have a filtration system in place. In the 1990s a multimillion-dollar filtration system upgrade was made to the Lake Casitas facility. The US Department of the Interior conducted a 10-year study on the lake where allowing body contact with water was explored. The study reported, "The capabilities of the current water filtration system to handle the additional burden of body contact were called into question. The system was shown to exceed current regulatory standards, and would “probably” be sufficient to mitigate body contact pollution as well". The Casitas Municipal Water District has not significantly changed the "no body contact with water" regulations in response to the facilities upgrade.

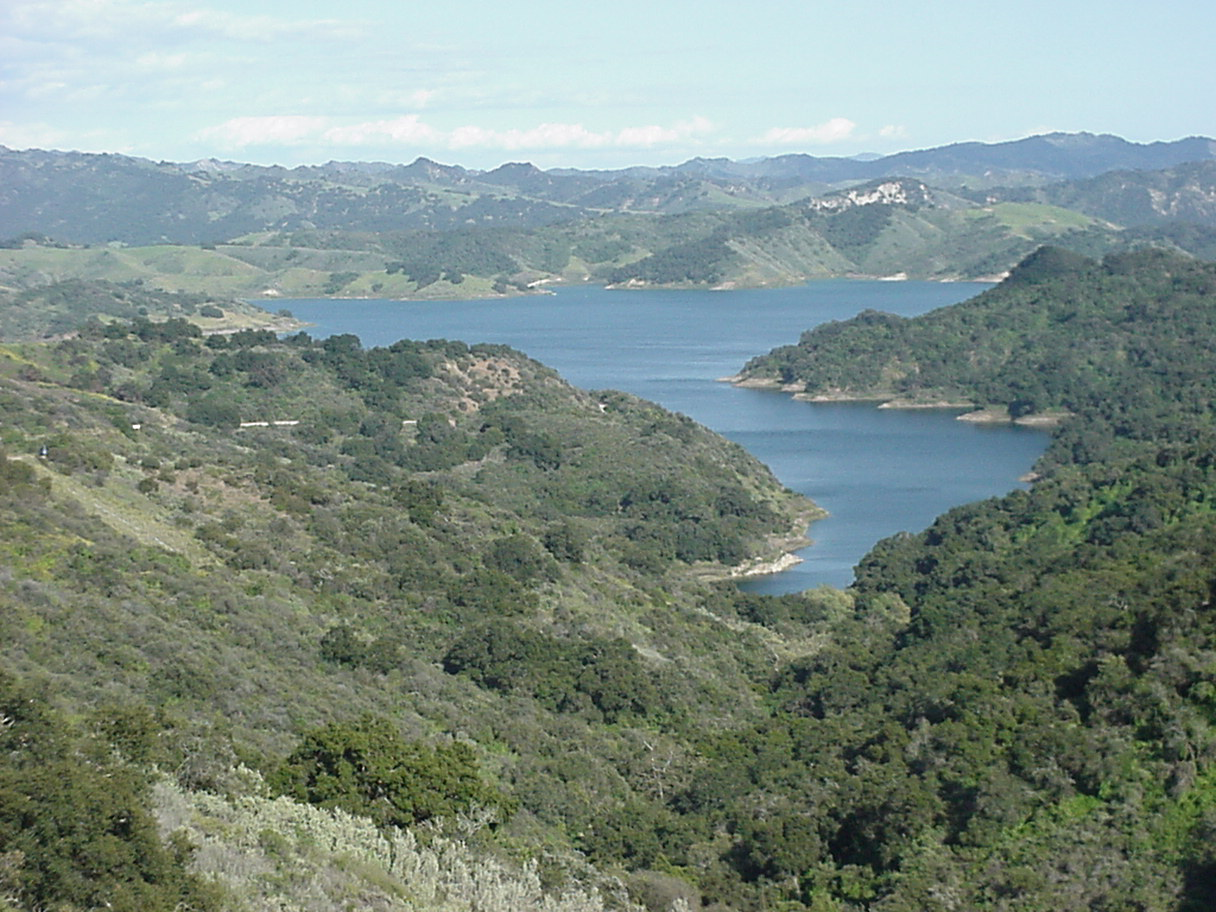
Lake Casitas as seen looking eastward from California State Route 150

== Fauna ==
What is believed to be the only nesting pair of bald eagles on the mainland of Ventura County uses a large nest in a eucalyptus tree at the lake. Two baby birds were born in the spring of 2022 and 2023. Ospreys fly around as they hunt fish. Bears are rare around the lake, but they have been spotted multiple times.

== See also ==
- List of dams and reservoirs in California
- List of lakes in California
- List of largest reservoirs of California
