= Sespe Hot Springs =

Thermal springs

- Sespe hot river
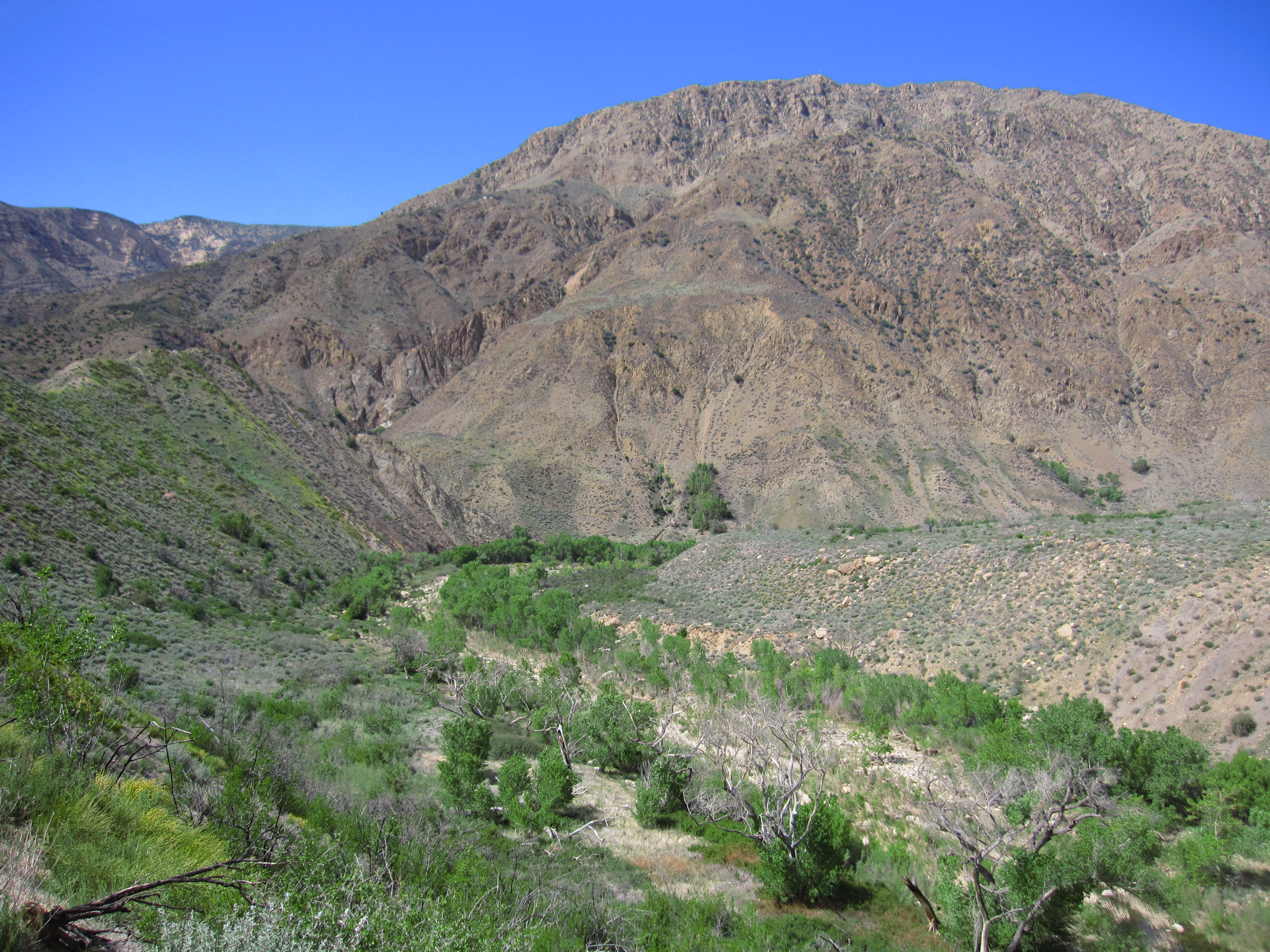
- Sespe Wilderness
- Interactive map of Sespe Hot Springs
- Location: near the Sespe Condor Sanctuary in California
- Coordinates: 34°25′40″N 118°59′52″W
- Elevation: 2,700 ft (820 m)
- Type: geothermal
- Discharge: 380 liters/minute
- Temperature: 90 °C (194 °F)

Sespe Hot Springs (Chumash: S'eqp'e') are a system of thermal springs and seeps that form a hot spring creek in the mountains near the Sespe Condor Sanctuary near Ojai, California.

== Description ==
The hot springs were used for centuries by local indigenous people for their warmth and healing properties. The hot springs and hot creek are located in a remote desert mountainous area in Los Padres National Forest. The hot mineral water emerges from the ground at 194 °F / 90 °C through a series of seeps that flows down a hillside, cooling as it enters several primitive, rock and boulder-lined soaking pools. The temperature of the water cools as it mixes with cool water from a creek. Several seeps along the creekside emerge at cooler temperatures than the main springs. At the site, there is also a primitive rock sauna, and a hot waterfall.

== Location ==
The hot springs are located 20 miles northeast of Sespe Creek canyon, approximately 20 miles from Matilija Canyon and 15 miles south of the San Andreas Fault. The hot springs are accessible on foot or by horseback only. There are three rugged trails leading to the springs. The springs can be reached via the Sespe River Trail (16.8 miles each way); the Johnson Ridge Trail (9.5 miles each way); and the Alder Creek Trail (7.5 miles each way). Willett Hot Springs are also located in the Sespe Wilderness area.

== Water profile ==
The hot mineral water flows from at least four spring clusters on a bank above Sespe Creek, a source on the steep slope, and from seeps in the stream bed gravel. In 1915 the water temperature was measured at 191 °F (88 °C) from one of the springs on the high slope above the creek. The springs on the bank emerge from crushed shale and decomposed granite. In 2008 the spring water was measured at 194 °F (90 °C).

== See also ==
- Sespe Creek
- List of hot springs in the United States
