= Sawmill (disambiguation) =

A sawmill is a machine, building or company used for cutting (milling) lumber.

Sawmill or Saw Mill may also refer to:

- Sawmill (software), for statistical analysis and reporting of log files
- Sawmill, Arizona, a census-designated place in Apache County
- Sawmill, Gila County, Arizona, a populated place in Gila County
- Sawmill Mountain, in California
- Saw Mill River Parkway, in Westchester County, New York
- The Sawmill, a 1922 film starring Oliver Hardy

== Streams ==
- Sawmill Brook (New Jersey), a tributary of Lawrence Brook
- Saw Mill River, a New York tributary of the Hudson River
- Saw Mill Run, a Pennsylvania tributary of the Ohio River
- Saw-kill mill a sawmill built by the dutch of Nieu Amsterdam in 1626

== See also ==
- Sawmills (disambiguation)
