= Salmon Creek Falls =

Waterfall on Salmon Creek in Los Padres National Forest, California

Coordinates: 35.81934°N 121.35206°W

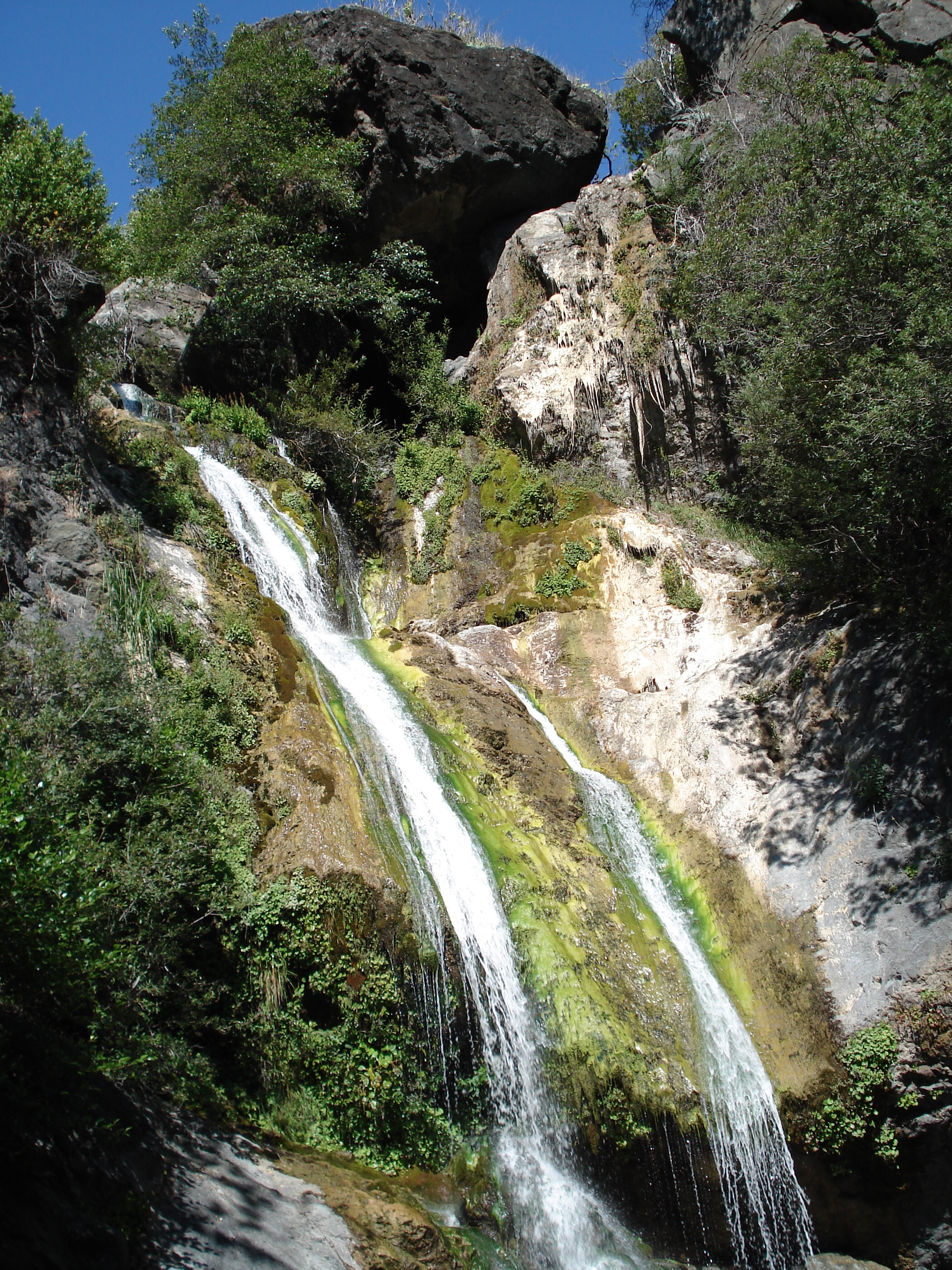
- Salmon Creek Falls
- Location: Near Gorda in Los Padres National Forest, Monterey County, California, United States
- Type: Segmented
- Elevation: 300 ft (91 m)
- Total height: 12 ft (3.7 m)
- Number of drops: 1
- Total width: 75 ft (23 m)
- Run: 120 ft (37 m)

Salmon Creek Falls is a 120-foot (36 meter) waterfall in the southern Big Sur region of Monterey County, California. The falls are located along California State Route 1 about 2.9 mi (4.7 km) northwest of Ragged Point and lies within the Monterey Ranger District of the Los Padres National Forest and Silver Peak Wilderness.

== Location ==
The falls are located along California State Route 1 about 2.9 mi (4.7 km) northwest of Ragged Point. The nearest settlement is the village of Gorda, about 6.5 mi (10.5 km) northwest of the falls.

== Hydrology ==
As Salmon Creek descends a canyon along the southwestern slope of the Santa Lucia Range, it produces a series of small cataracts over a distance of 1.4 mi (2.3 km) before reaching the head of the main falls. Here the water pools behind several large boulders. The creek then curves around the boulders before cascading 12 ft (3.7 m) down a steep cliff. A shallow pool is present at the base of the falls. From here, the creek continues southwest toward the Pacific Ocean.

== Access ==
An unpaved 0.3 mi (0.48 km) trail from California State Route 1 provides access to a view of the main falls beside several large boulders. The trail does not provide direct access to the base of the falls, which requires one to scramble over a pair of boulders to reach.

The head of the falls are accessible via Salmon Creek Trail, which branches off toward the east and approaches the falls at a higher elevation. The trail is a popular access route for backpackers visiting Silver Peak Wilderness.

== See also ==
- List of waterfalls
- List of waterfalls in California
- Limekiln State Park
