= Abadi Creek =

Stream in California, USA

Abadi Creek Tributary to Sespe Creek
- Location of Abadi Creek mouth Abadi Creek (the United States)

Location
- Country: United States
- State: California
- County: Ventura; Santa Barbara

Physical characteristics
- Source: Lacusca Creek divide
  - location: about 10 miles southeast of Don Victor Valley
  - coordinates: 34°36′35″N 119°27′14″W
  - elevation: 5,110 ft (1,560 m)
- Mouth: Sespe Creek
  - location: about 6 miles southeast of Potrero Seco
  - coordinates: 34°36′35″N 119°27′14″W
  - elevation: 4,232 ft (1,290 m)
- Length: 6.57 mi (10.57 km)
- Basin size: 7.20 square miles (18.6 km^{2})
- Discharge
  - location: Sespe Creek
  - average: 6.82 cu ft/s (0.193 m^{3}/s) at mouth with Sespe Creek

Basin features
- Progression: Sespe Creek → Santa Clara River → Pacific Ocean
- River system: Santa Clara River
- Tributaries
  - left: unnamed tributaties
  - right: unnamed tributaries
- Bridges: NF-6NO3, Upper Hartman Ranch Road

Abadi Creek is a stream located in the U.S. state of California. It is located in Santa Barbara County.

== See also ==
- List of rivers of California
