= Chumash Wilderness =

Protected wilderness area in California, United States

- IUCN category Ib (wilderness area)
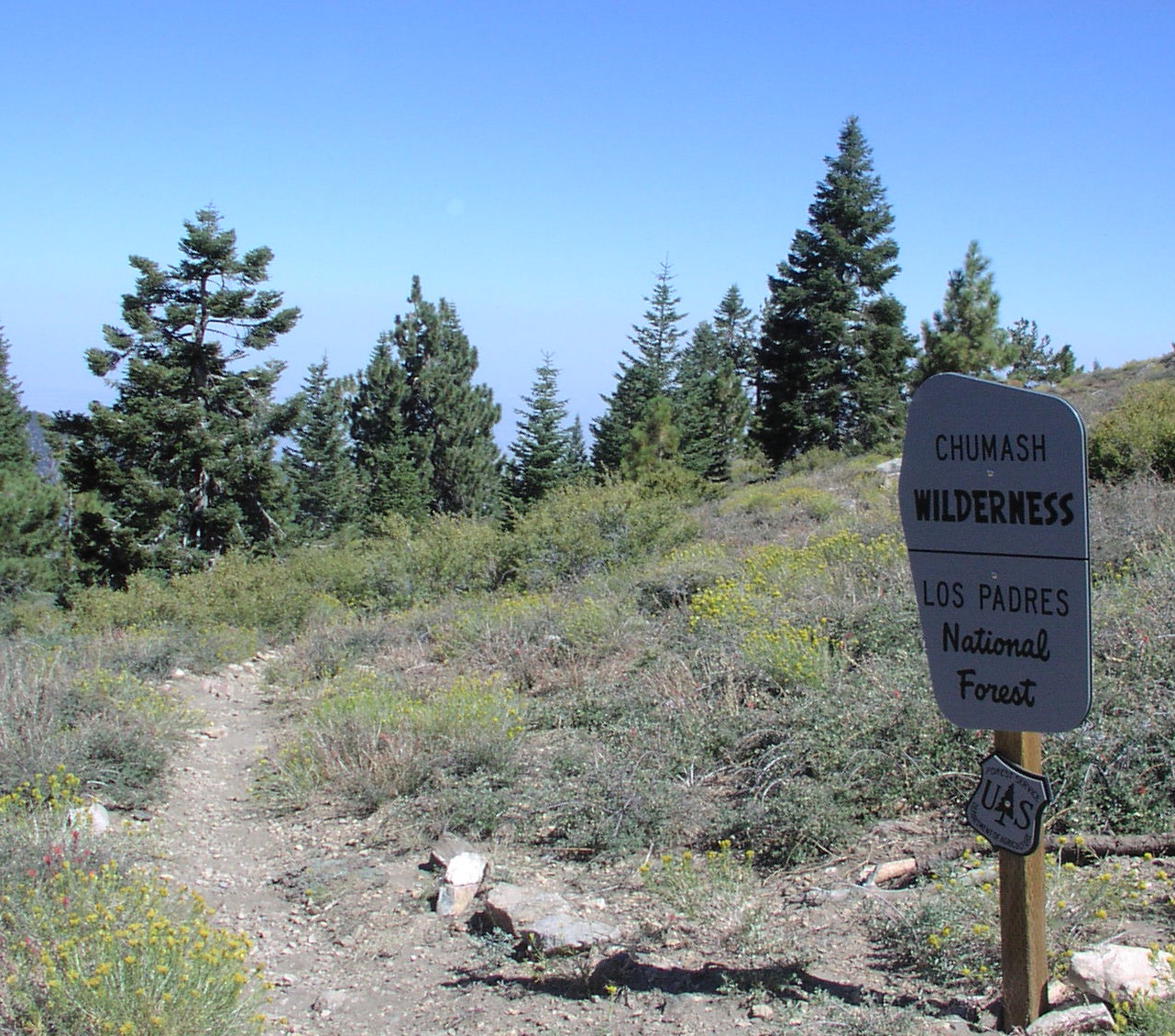
- Trailhead into the Chumash Wilderness, immediately west of the summit of Mount Pinos

- Location within southern California Location within California Location within the United States
- Interactive map of Chumash Wilderness
- Location: Ventura / Kern counties, California, United States
- Nearest city: Bakersfield, California
- Coordinates: 34°49′0″N 119°10′0″W
- Area: 38,150 acres (154.4 km^{2})
- Established: 1992
- Governing body: U.S. Forest Service

The Chumash Wilderness is a 38,150 acres (15,440 ha) wilderness area within the southern Los Padres National Forest. It is located in the Transverse Ranges, in northern Ventura County and southwestern Kern County in California.

The wilderness was created by the United States Congress as part of the Los Padres Condor Range and River Protection Act of 1992 (Public Law 102–301). The same legislation also established the Garcia, Machesna Mountain, Matilija, Sespe, and Silver Peak Wilderness areas.

== Geography ==
The Chumash Wilderness includes most of the highest terrain in Ventura County. The nearest towns are in the Mountain Communities of the Tejon Pass region, including the unincorporated communities of Frazier Park to the east, Lockwood Valley and Cuddy Valley to the south, and Pine Mountain Club to the north. The Cuyama Valley region is to the west.

The wilderness area extends from just west of the summit of Mount Pinos (8,831 ft; 2,692 m) to Cerro Noroeste (Mount Abel) to the west, and south into the badlands north of Lockwood Valley Road. Since Mount Pinos, Cerro Noroeste, and the Pine Mountain Club are developed with paved roads, they did not qualify for inclusion in the wilderness, which wraps partially around them. The highest point in the Chumash Wilderness is Sawmill Mountain, at 8,818 ft (2,688 m).

Major trailheads into the wilderness can be found at Mount Pinos and Cerro Noroeste/Mount Abel. From the Mount Pinos parking area, the wilderness trailhead is approximately 2 miles (3 km) along a dirt road with a locked gate.

Vegetation within the wilderness includes chaparral at lower elevations, and conifers at higher elevations. Some of the badlands near the southern edge of the wilderness are almost barren of vegetation and include steep slopes with knife-edge ridges. Snow is frequent from fall until late spring at the highest elevations. Rain is rare in the summer, and wildfires are natural in the fire ecology based habitats.

Fauna of the wilderness include black bear, mountain lion, bobcat, as well as the endangered California condor. The wilderness is centrally located in the historic range of this large endangered species of scavengers.

== See also ==
- Sespe Condor Sanctuary
- Mountain Communities of the Tejon Pass
- Wilderness areas of California
