= Los Padres Condor Range and River Protection Act of 1992 =

US federal law

- Enacted by: the 102nd United States Congress
- Effective: June 19, 1992

Citations
- Public law: 102-301

Legislative history
- Introduced in the House as H.R. 2556 by Robert J. Lagomarsino (R–CA) on June 5, 1991; Committee consideration by United States House Committee on Agriculture, United States House Committee on Insular Affairs, Senate Committee on Energy and Natural Resources; Passed the House on November 12, 1991; Passed the Senate on June 4, 1992; Signed into law by President George H. W. Bush on June 19, 1992

The Los Padres Condor Range and River Protection Act of 1992 (Public Law 102-301) is a Federal law that established five new designated Wilderness Areas and three new designated Wild and Scenic Rivers in the Los Padres National Forest and Angeles National Forest in California. The law was sponsored by California Republican and Ventura County native Robert J. Lagomarsino while he represented California's 19th District in the United States House of Representatives. The legislation was cosponsored by Democratic and Republican representatives from districts representing the entirety of the Los Padres National Forest.

Signed by President George H. W. Bush, the law designated 316,050 acres (127,900 ha) of new wilderness, expanded existing wilderness by 84,400 acres (34,200 ha), and designated 84 miles (135 km) of new Wild and Scenic Rivers. Most of the areas protected by the law provide habitat for the California condor, a species that was extant only in captivity as of 1987 when all 27 condors left in the world were being kept in California breeding facilities and for which the legislation was named. Six months before the bill was signed into law in 1992, two of the captive California condors were reintroduced into the Sespe Condor Sanctuary, a protected area that would go on to become part of the new Sespe Wilderness in Ventura County, California.

== Background ==
The Los Padres Condor Range and River Protection Act was first introduced to Congress as H.R. 4747 (100th U.S. Congress) by Representative Robert J. Lagomarsino in 1988. This first version of the legislation sought only to establish the Sespe and Matilija Wilderness Areas in addition to expanding the San Rafael Wilderness.

Lagomarsino then reintroduced the bill in 1989 as H.R. 1473 (101st U.S. Congress), which was altered from the previous version to also designate the Garcia and San Emigdio Mesa Wilderness Areas while expanding the Ventana Wilderness. This version of the legislation would have also designated portions of Sespe Creek, Sisquoc River, and Big Sur River as Wild and Scenic Rivers. The bill passed the House of Representatives with amendments in October 1989, but never received a floor vote in the Senate.

Lagomarsino worked closely with both of California's senators at the time, Democratic Senator Alan Cranston and Republican Senator John F. Seymour, in developing the final bill that would be eventually signed into law. The bill introduced to and eventually passed by both houses of the 102nd U.S. Congress changed from the previous version by also establishing the Chumash and Silver Peak Wilderness Areas, containing no provisions allowing for new directional oil drilling leases under wilderness, and modified language regarding water rights and management of wilderness areas. President George H.W. Bush signed the Los Padres Condor Range and River Protection Act into law in 1992, lauding the legislation for protecting habitat critical to the recovery of the nearly extinct California condor, increasing the amount of national forest lands in California protected under the Wilderness Act of 1964 by 10%, and permanently protecting nearly half of the Los Padres National Forest as wilderness.

== Designation of New Wilderness Areas ==
Five new wilderness areas totaling 316,050 acres were designated within the Los Padres National Forest (although the Sespe Wilderness includes a small portion of the Angeles National Forest):

- Sespe Wilderness - 219,700 acres
- Chumash Wilderness - 38,150 acres
- Matilija Wilderness - 29,600 acres
- Silver Peak Wilderness - 14,500 acres
- Garcia Wilderness - 14,100 acres

These wilderness areas span Kern, Monterey, San Luis Obispo, Santa Barbara, and Ventura Counties as well as the Los Padres National Forest's Santa Lucia, Monterey, Mount Pinos, and Ojai Ranger Districts

== Expansion of Existing Wilderness Areas ==
Two existing wilderness areas within the Los Padres National Forest were expanded by 84,400 acres:

- San Rafael Wilderness - 46,400 acres
- Ventana Wilderness - 38,000 acres

These wilderness areas span Monterey and Santa Barbara Counties and the Los Padrs National Forest's Santa Barbara, Santa Lucia, and Monterey Ranger Districts.

== Designation of Wild and Scenic Rivers ==
The legislation amended the Wild and Scenic Rivers Act of 1968 to establish 84 miles of three streams within the Los Padres National Forest as new Wild and Scenic Rivers:

- Sisquoc River - 33 miles (Wild River)
- Sespe Creek - 31.5 miles (4 miles as a Scenic River and 27.5 miles as a Wild River)
- Big Sur River - 19.5 miles (Wild River)

== Other Provisions ==
In designating the Sespe Wilderness, the Los Padres Condor Range and River Protection Act also recognized an existing 18-mile trail between Reyes Creek and Lion Campgrounds as the Gene Marshall-Piedra Blanca National Recreation Trail. The legislation established water rights to begin reserving a quantity of water "sufficient to fulfill the purposes of this Act." Additionally, the legislation amended the Wild and Scenic Rivers Act of 1968 by adding portions of Piru Creek, Little Sur River, Matilija Creek, Lopez Creek, and Sespe Creek to the list of streams for potential designation as Wild and Scenic Rivers.
