= Mount Abel =

Mount Abel may refer to:

- Mount Abel (British Columbia) in British Columbia, Canada
- the former name of Cerro Noroeste in California, USA
