= Garcia Wilderness =

Protected wilderness area in California, United States

- IUCN category Ib (wilderness area)
- Location within southern California Location within California Location within the United States
- Interactive map of Garcia Wilderness
- Location: San Luis Obispo County, California
- Nearest city: Santa Maria, California
- Coordinates: 35°14′56″N 120°18′35″W
- Area: 14,100 acres (57 km^{2})
- Established: 1992
- Governing body: US Forest Service and USDA

The Garcia Wilderness is a 14,100-acre (57 km^{2}) wilderness area within the Los Padres National Forest in San Luis Obispo County, California.

The wilderness was created by the U.S. Congress as part of the Los Padres Condor Range and River Protection Act of 1992 (Public Law 102-301). The same legislation also established the Chumash, Machesna Mountain, Matilija, Sespe, and Silver Peak Wilderness areas. It is named for the mountain it protects, the east–west ridge of Garcia Mountain, a 3,146 ft. peak of the Santa Lucia Range. The area's vegetation includes chaparral and grasslands to oak forests.

The main river drainages are the Salinas River and the Santa Maria River.

There are two designated campgrounds and three hiking trails, the longest being the 11-mile (18 km) Caldwell Mesa Trail.

== Notes and references ==
- Text of Los Padres Condor Range and River Protection Act, 102–301.pdf
