= Pinnacles National Forest =

Former national forest in California

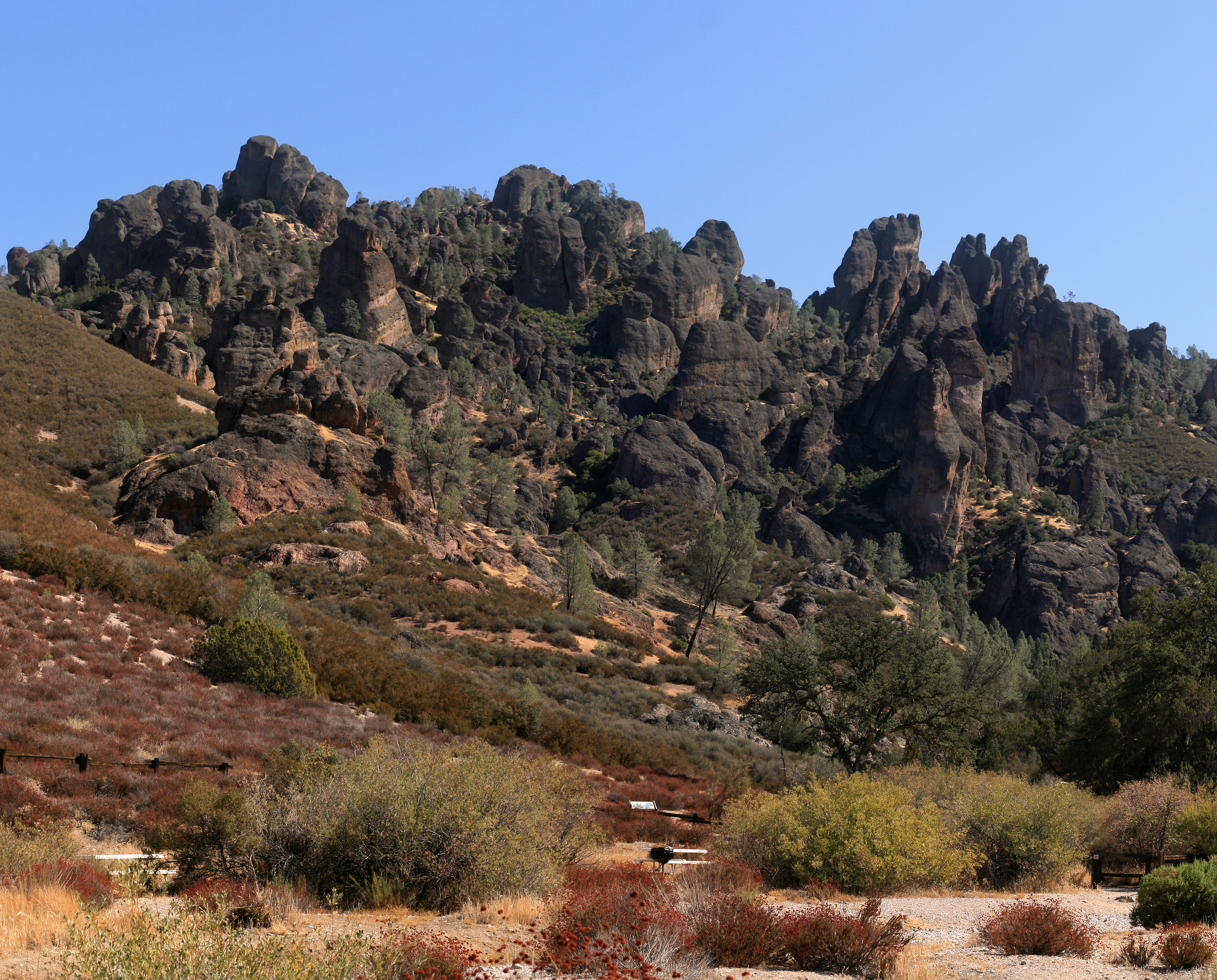
- Rock formations in the former Pinnacles National Forest, now a portion of Pinnacles National Park

- Location within California Location within the United States
- Location: San Benito County & Monterey County, California, USA
- Nearest city: Paicines, California
- Coordinates: 36°30′0″N 121°12′00″W
- Area: 14,108 acres (57.09 km^{2})
- Created: July 18, 1906

Pinnacles National Forest was a United States National Forest in California. It was established as the Pinnacles Forest Reserve under the authority of the U.S. Forest Service by Presidential proclamation on July 18, 1906 with 14,108 acres (57.09 km^{2}). It became a national forest on March 4, 1907, when all U.S. national forest reserves were redesignated as national forests by act of U.S. Congress. On July 1, 1908, Pinnacles was added to Monterey National Forest by executive order, and the name was discontinued. The lands currently exist in Los Padres National Forest and in Pinnacles National Park, proclaimed as Pinnacles National Monument by Theodore Roosevelt in 1908.
