= Silver Peak Wilderness =

Protected wilderness area in California, United States

- IUCN category Ib (wilderness area)
- Location within California Location within the United States
- Interactive map of Silver Peak Wilderness
- Location: Monterey County, California, United States
- Nearest city: San Simeon, CA
- Coordinates: 35°50′N 121°18′W
- Area: 31,555 acres (128 km^{2})
- Established: 1992
- Governing body: U.S. Forest Service

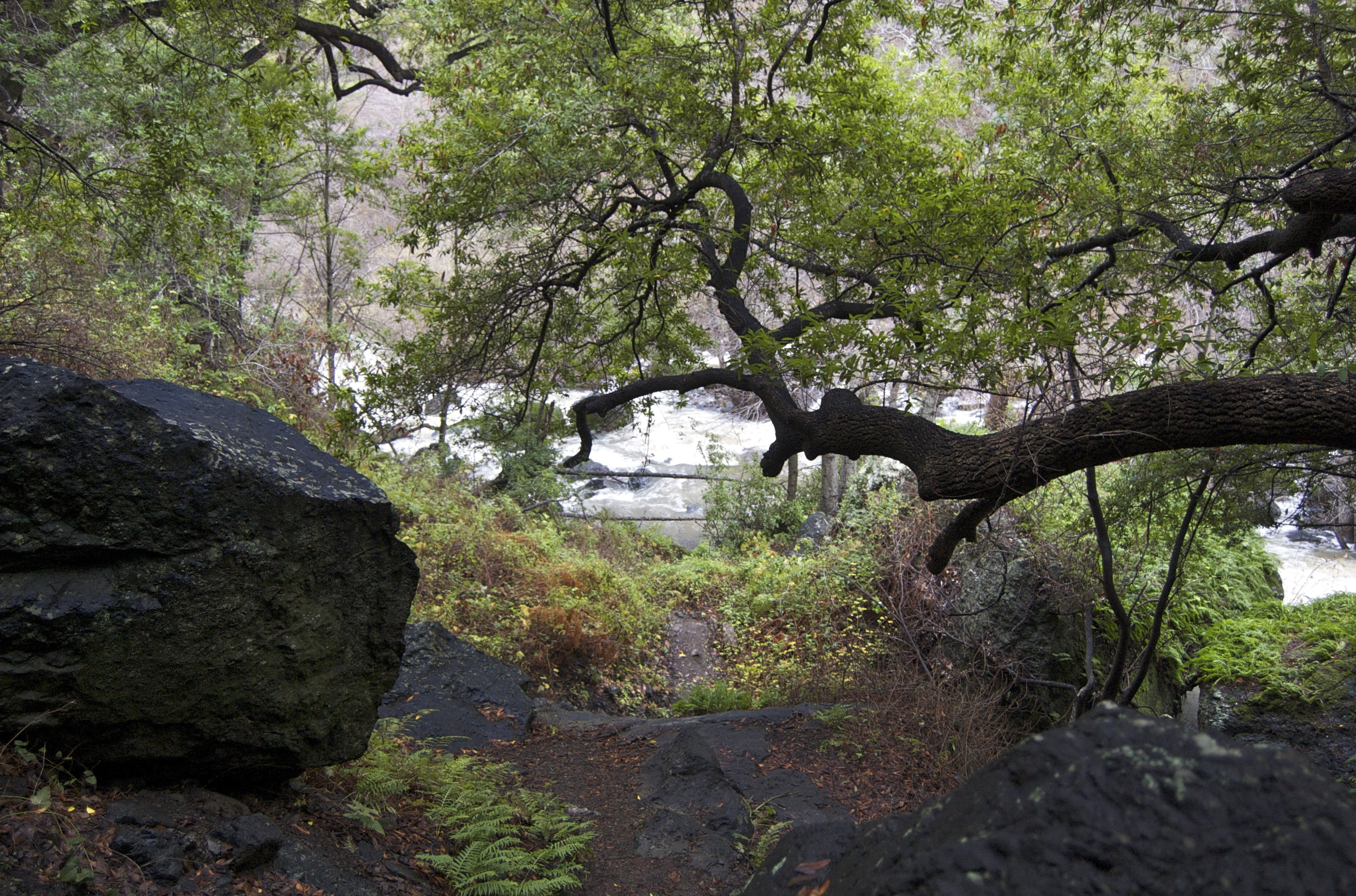
Salmon Creek, on the trail to Salmon Creek Falls

The Silver Peak Wilderness is located in the southwestern corner of Monterey County in the Santa Lucia Mountains along the Central Coast of California. It southern boundary largely follows the Monterey County/San Luis Obispo County line. Its eastern boundary is defined by Ft. Hunter Liggett, while on the west it follows closely along Highway 1 and the Big Sur coastline. It is one of ten wilderness areas within the Los Padres National Forest and managed by the US Forest Service.

The wilderness was created by the U.S. Congress as part of the Los Padres Condor Range and River Protection Act of 1992 (Public Law 102-301) which set aside approximately 14,500 acres (59 km^{2}). The same legislation also established the Chumash, Garcia, Machesna Mountain, Matilija, and Sespe Wilderness areas. On December 19, 2002 the Big Sur Wilderness and Conservation Act of 2002 added 17,055 acres (69.02 km^{2}) to the existing wilderness. The Wilderness is in two separate units, divided by the Willow Creek drainage and the fire roads to Alder Creek.

The wilderness terrain rises steeply from near the Pacific Ocean to Silver Peak itself at 3,590 feet (1,090 m). Vegetation in the forests includes California sycamore, the big leaf maple, and red alder. Open slopes are dominated by ceanothus, manzanita, coastal live oak, and gray pine. There is also an isolated stand of coastal redwoods, the world's southernmost stand of redwoods. The wilderness also encompasses a rare grove of Sargent cypress, gray pines, and Santa Lucia fir.

In the spring when the creeks fill, some of the steeper canyons feature waterfalls. Salmon Creek Falls, just off CA-1, is a very popular attraction, and the Salmon Creek Trail is a popular access point to the Wilderness. Views on clear days extend to the Big Sur coastline to the north, the Pacific Ocean to the west, and the Salinas Valley to the east.

Recreation includes backpacking, horse camping, and day trips. As with all wilderness areas, motorized and mechanized vehicles (including mountain bikes) are prohibited everywhere except the forest service roads.
