= Monterey National Forest =

Former national forest in California

Monterey National Forest was established as the Monterey Forest Reserve by the U.S. Forest Service in California on June 25, 1906 with 335,195 acres (1,356.49 km^{2}). It became a National Forest on March 4, 1907. On July 1, 1908 Pinnacles National Forest and San Benito National Forest were added. On August 8, 1919 the entire forest was transferred to Santa Barbara National Forest and the name was discontinued. The lands presently exist in Los Padres National Forest.
