= Sawmill Mountain =

Mountain in California, United States

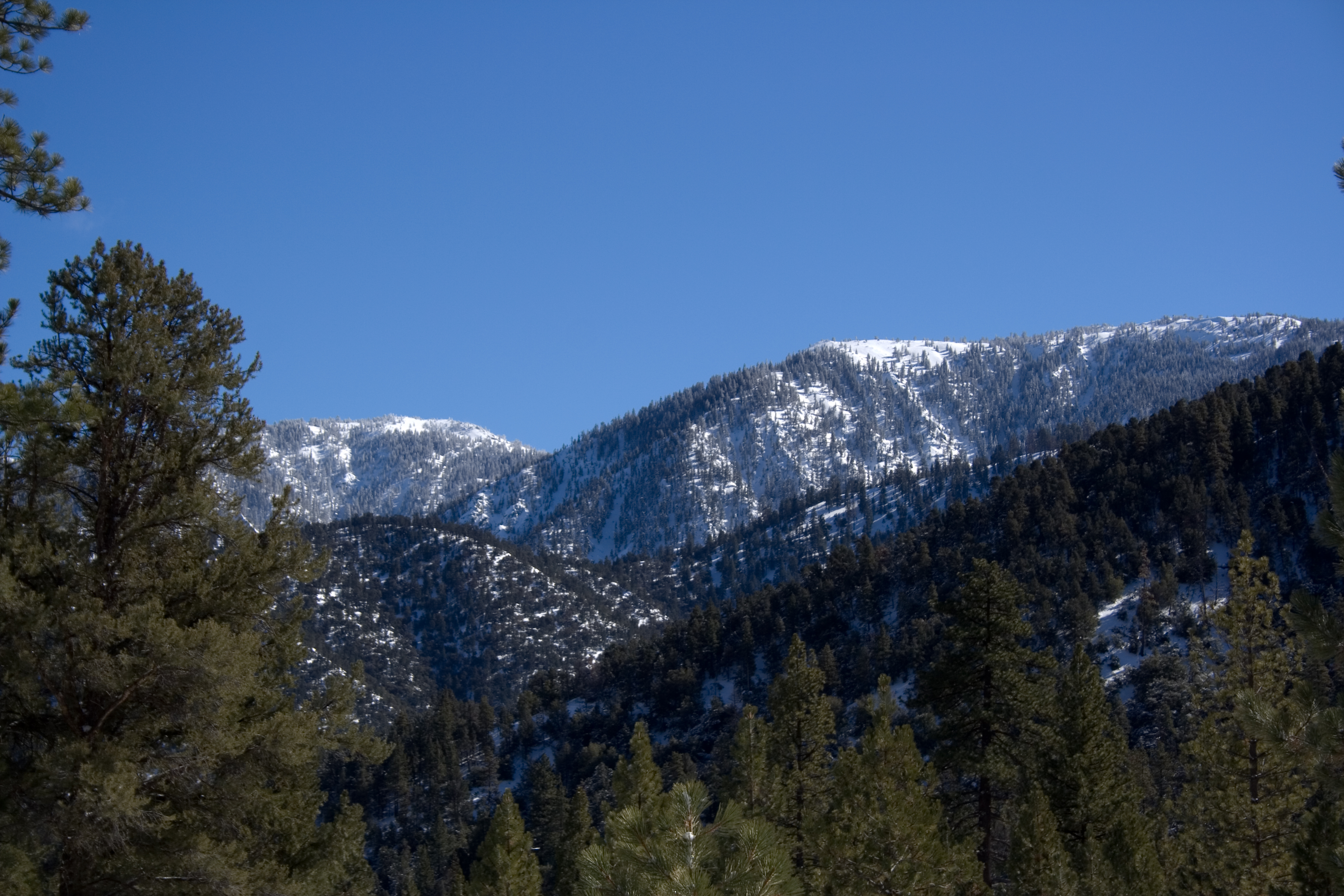
- Sawmill Mt. to the right with Mt. Pinos to the left.

Highest point
- Elevation: 8,822 ft (2,689 m) NAVD 88
- Prominence: 418 ft (127 m)
- Listing: California county high points 23rd Hundred Peaks Section
- Coordinates: 34°48′49″N 119°10′02″W

Geography
- Location within California Location within the United States
- Location: Kern and Ventura counties, California, U.S.
- Topo map: USGS Sawmill Mountain

Climbing
- Easiest route: Trail hike

Sawmill Mountain is located on the county line between Kern and Ventura counties in California. The mountain is located in the Chumash Wilderness and its summit is the highest point in Kern County and the second highest in the Los Padres National Forest. Mount Pinos has an elevation of 8,847 feet (2,697 m) and tops Sawmill Mountain as the highest in Ventura County by 29 feet.
