= Sawmills (disambiguation) =

Sawmills are facilities where logs are cut to length.

Sawmills may also refer to:

- Sawmills Studios, a famous UK music recording studio
- Sawmills, North Carolina

== See also ==
- Sawmill (disambiguation)
