= Sespe Wilderness =

Protected wilderness area in California, United States

- IUCN category Ib (wilderness area)
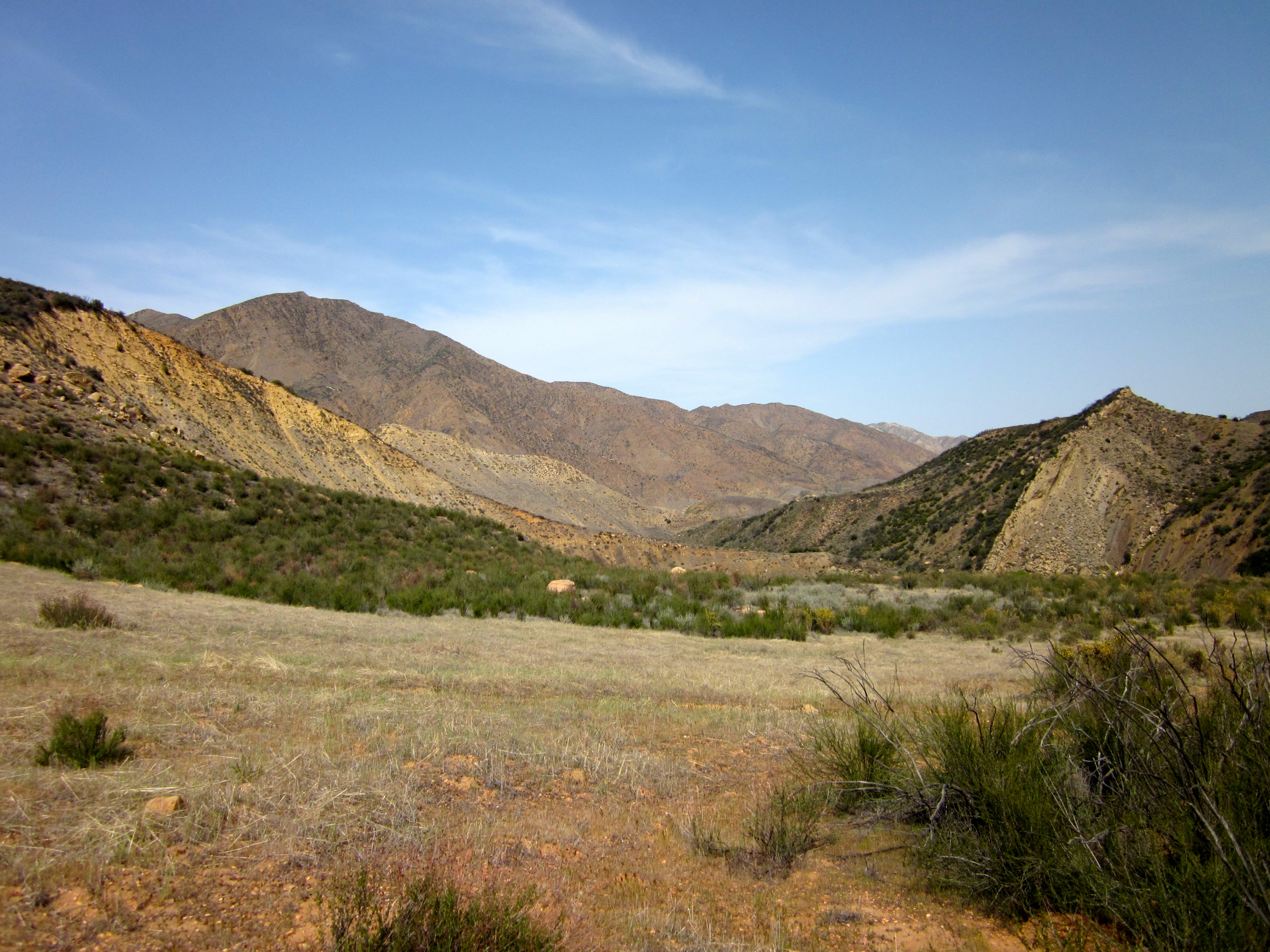

- Location within the Los Angeles metropolitan area Location within southern California Location within California Location within the United States
- Interactive map of Sespe Wilderness
- Location: California, United States
- Nearest city: Ventura, California
- Coordinates: 34°35′06″N 119°01′12″W
- Area: 219,700 acres (88,900 ha)
- Established: 1992
- Governing body: U.S. Forest Service

The Sespe Wilderness is a 219,700-acre (88,900 ha) wilderness area in the eastern Topatopa Mountains and southern Sierra Pelona Mountains, within the Los Padres National Forest (LPNF), in Ventura County, Southern California. The Sespe Wilderness takes up 18% of the county's land, yet it truly is an entire vast wilderness that feels much further from any town. It is one of the largest roadless and truly wild spaces in Southern California.The wilderness area is primarily located within the Ojai and Mt. Pinos ranger districts of the LPNF.

The wilderness was created by the United States Congress as part of the Los Padres Condor Range and River Protection Act of 1992 (Public Law 102-301). The same legislation also established the Chumash, Garcia, Machesna Mountain, Matilija, and Silver Peak Wilderness areas. The Sespe Condor Sanctuary is within the Sespe Wilderness. It was established to promote the propagation and growth of the California condor, and is closed to the public.

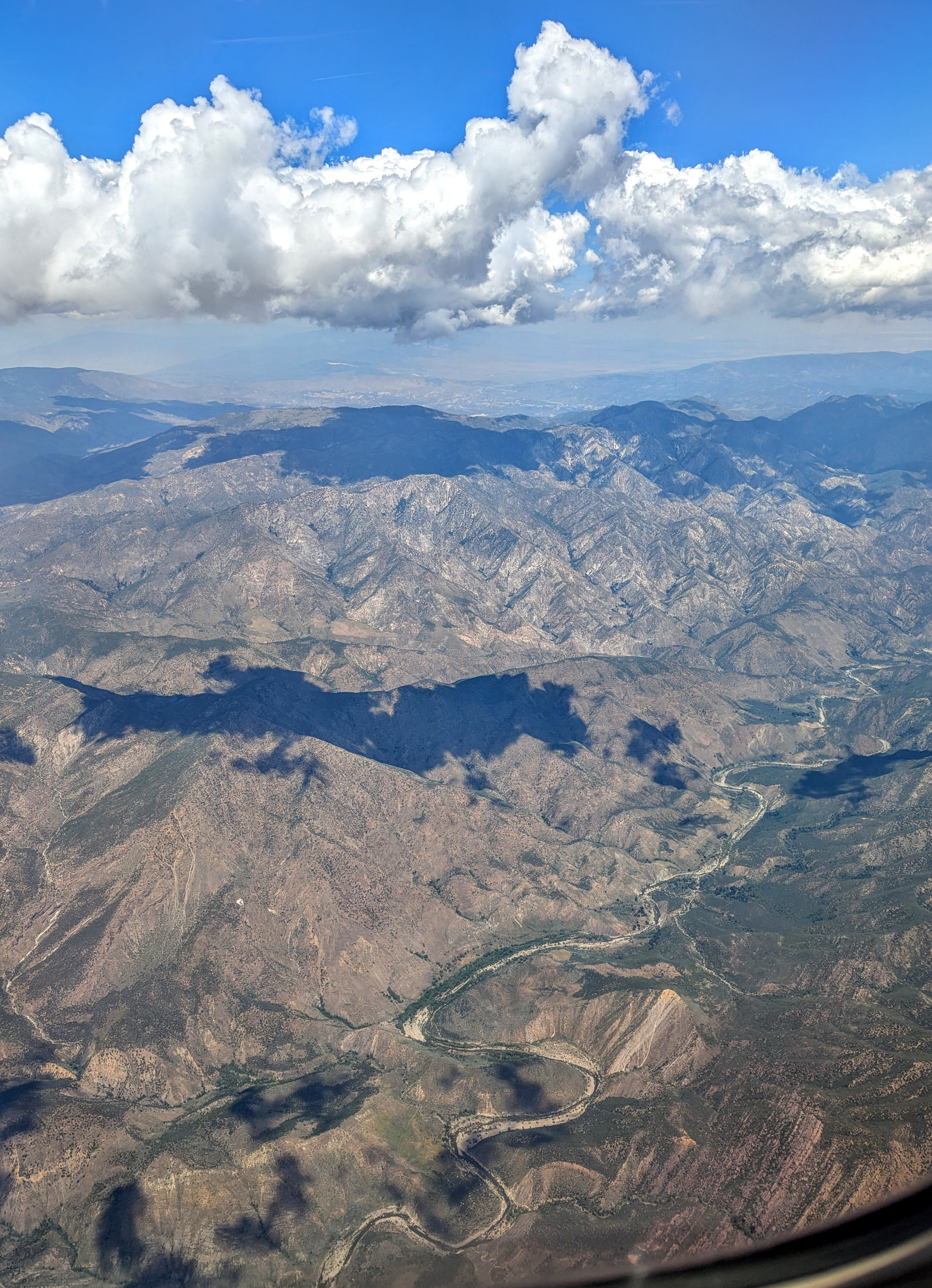
Aerial view of Sespe Creek and the Sespe Wilderness

== Features ==
The Sespe Wilderness is primarily chaparral-covered terrain, with areas of California oak woodland and riparian habitats. A section of Sespe Creek flows through it.

There are hiking trails, perennial and seasonal creeks, waterfalls, hot springs, rock formations, and designated campsites in the wilderness area.

Nearby wilderness areas of the southern Los Padres National Forest include the Matilija Wilderness (west) and Chumash Wilderness (northwest). The Dick Smith Wilderness is further to the northwest.

== Geography and topography ==
The Sespe Wilderness is 219,468 acres in total with large variations in elevation, from deep river valleys and steep sandstone cliffs. This creates a wide range of different habitats and microclimates within the Sespe Wilderness. The defining feature is the Sespe Creek which is one of the last free-flowing, untamed streams in Southern California. It is a 55-mile long tributary of the Santa Clara River that creates the ideal habitat for the southern steelhead trout.

== Flora and fauna ==
The Sespe Wilderness is home to a vast variety of flora and fauna, including more than a dozen federally endangered or threatened species, that show us a glimpse of what most of Southern California was like before urbanization. Chaparral habitats dominate most of the land here with key plant species that include Chamise (Adenostoma fasciculatum), Manzanita (Arctostaphylos spp.), California Buckwheat (Eriogonum fasciculatum), Scrub Oak (Quercus berberidifolia), and Toyon (Heteromeles arbutifolia). Common wildflowers such as the California Lilac (Ceanothus spp.) and Purple Sage (Salvia leucophylla) paint the rolling hills and mountains in the spring and summer. Key plant species in the riparian areas include White Alder (Alnus rhombifolia), Black Cottonwood (Populus trichocarpa), Western Sycamore (Platanus racemosa), Willows (Salix spp.), and Canyon Live Oak (Quercus chrysolepis). All of the flora in the Sespe is specifally adapted to be drought tolerant and fire resistant in order to thrive. Many animals call Sespe their home as there are diverse habitats across the range. The most significant species is the endangered California Condor (Gymnogyps californianus), as a part of the national park, the Sespe Condor Sanctuary, is specifically dedicated to protecting and caring for them. Mammals that roam Sespe include the black bear (Ursus americanus), mountain lion (Puma concolor), mule deer (Odocoileus hemionus), bobcat (Lynx rufus), and coyote (Canis latrans). Besides the California Condor, other birds that own these skies include the golden eagle, red-tailed hawk, and the least Bell's vireo. Key aquatic species in the Sespe Creek include but aren't limited to the southern steelhead trout, arroyo toad, southwestern pond turtle, and California red-legged frog. A significant reptile in the Sespe is the western rattlesnake.

== Cultural history ==
Besides being home to so many different native Southern California species, Sespe is also culturally significant as it is lies within traditional lands of the Chumash people. Numerous archaeological sites, petroglyphs, and ancient villages have been rediscovered. The land was utilized by bands from Piru, Sespe and Mupu for hunting, gathering, cultural practices, and trade trail routes. Many continue to use the site for cultural indigenous practices.

== Hiking trails ==
- Sespe River Trail: It crosses the Sespe River many times. There are hot springs and views of cottonwoods, sycamores and white alders. Located at exit Rose Valley Road, continuing past the lakes and road to Rose Valley Falls all the way to the Piedra Blanca Trailhead.
- Middle Sespe Trail: Off Highway 33, this trail heads east for 8 miles. It climbs on a hill before descending to Rock Creek; then it parallels Sespe Creek to its intersection with the Gene Marshall-Piedra Blanca National Recreation Trail.
- Lion Canyon Trail: This trail crosses Lion Creek before ascending into a canyon, where it splits 3 ways. The east and west forks lead to scenic waterfalls and trail camps, while the middle fork climbs to Nordhoff Ridge.
- Piedra Blanca Trail: This trail begins at Piedra Blanca Trailhead and follows Sespe Creek into the canyons. There are countless scenic spots to stop and swim in the river. Many use this trail for day hikes or longer backpacking trips such as the 10 mile trek to Willet Hot Springs.

== See also ==
- Los Padres National Forest topics
- Protected areas of Ventura County, California
