= San Benito National Forest =

Former national forest in California

San Benito National Forest was established by the U.S. Forest Service in California on October 26, 1907 with 140,069 acres (566.84 km^{2}). On July 1, 1908 San Benito was added to Monterey National Forest and the name was discontinued. Much of the land that once consisted of San Benito National Forest is now administered by the Bureau of Land Management Hollister Field office as the Clear Creek Management Area.
