= Cerro Noroeste =

Mountain peak in the San Emigdio Mountains of Southern California, USA

- Location within California Location within the United States

Highest point
- Elevation: 8,283 ft (2,525 m) NAVD 88
- Prominence: 680 ft (207 m)
- Listing: Hundred Peaks Section
- Coordinates: 34°49′51″N 119°12′12″W

Naming
- English translation: Northwest Mountain
- Language of name: Spanish

Geography
- Location: Kern County, California, U.S.
- Parent range: San Emigdio Mountains
- Topo map: USGS Sawmill Mountain

Climbing
- Easiest route: Road

Cerro Noroeste is a mountain located in Southern California's Kern County, a mile north of the Ventura County border. It is located a few miles southwest of the community of Pine Mountain Club, at an elevation of 8283 feet (2525+ m). The mountain is located in the Los Padres National Forest. It is surrounded by the Chumash Wilderness to the south and west, though the peak itself is not actually within the wilderness (since it is approached by a paved, public-access roadway).

The name Cerro Noroeste means 'northwest mountain'. It was formerly known as Mount Abel in honor of former Kern County supervisor Stanley Abel.

The summit can be reached by taking Cerro Noroeste Road, Forest Route 9N27. The road is closed every winter after the first or second snow. It usually is reopened in May though there can still be substantial snow from heavy winters. Located near the summit are Campo Alto campground and a radio tower.
