= Willett Hot Springs =

Thermal springs in California

- Location within California
- Location: Ventura County, California, USA
- Nearest city: Ojai
- Coordinates: 34°34′32″N 119°3′4″W
- Governing body: Los Padres National Forest, United States Forest Service

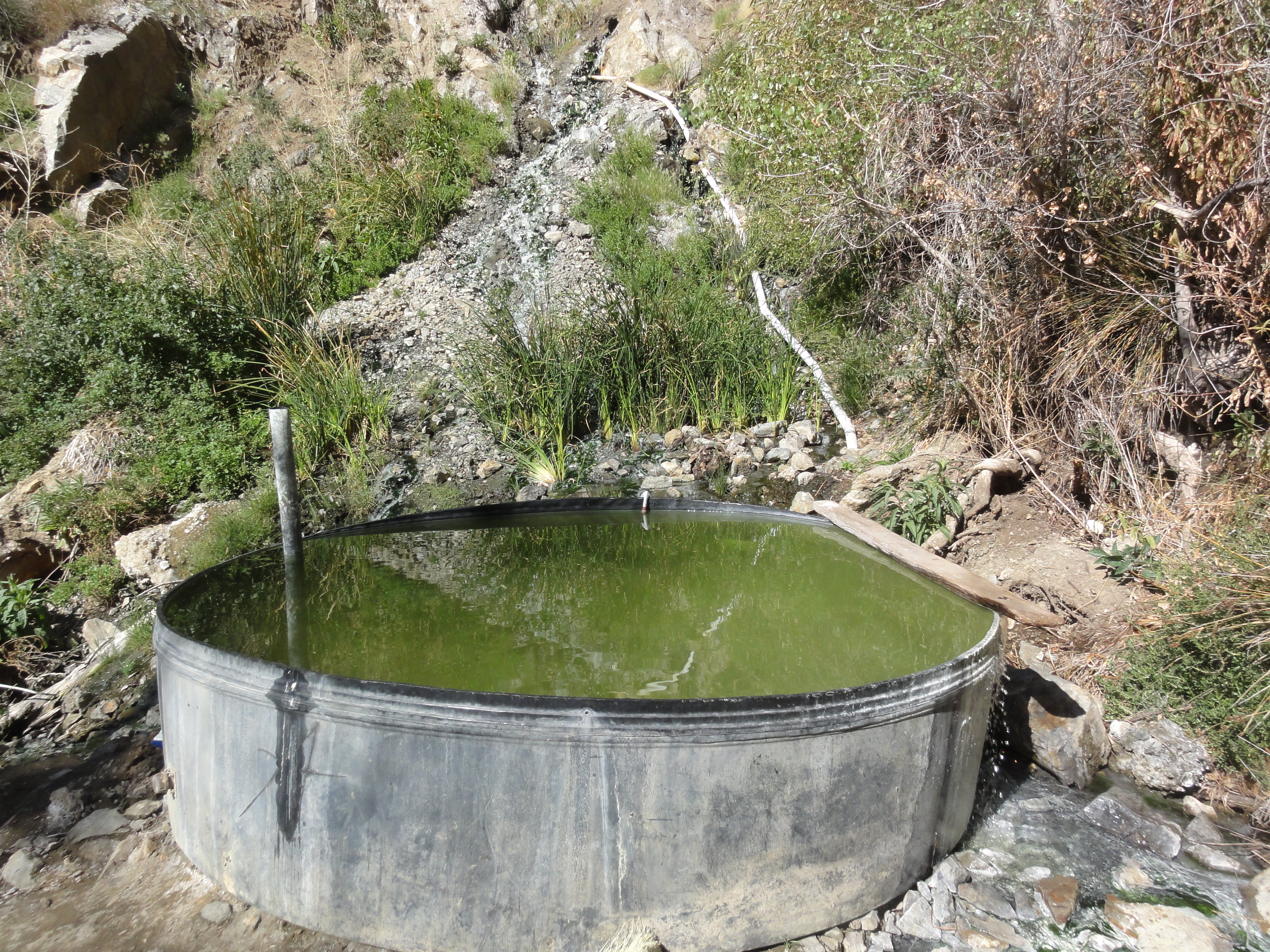
Willett Hot Springs: fed by hot springs.

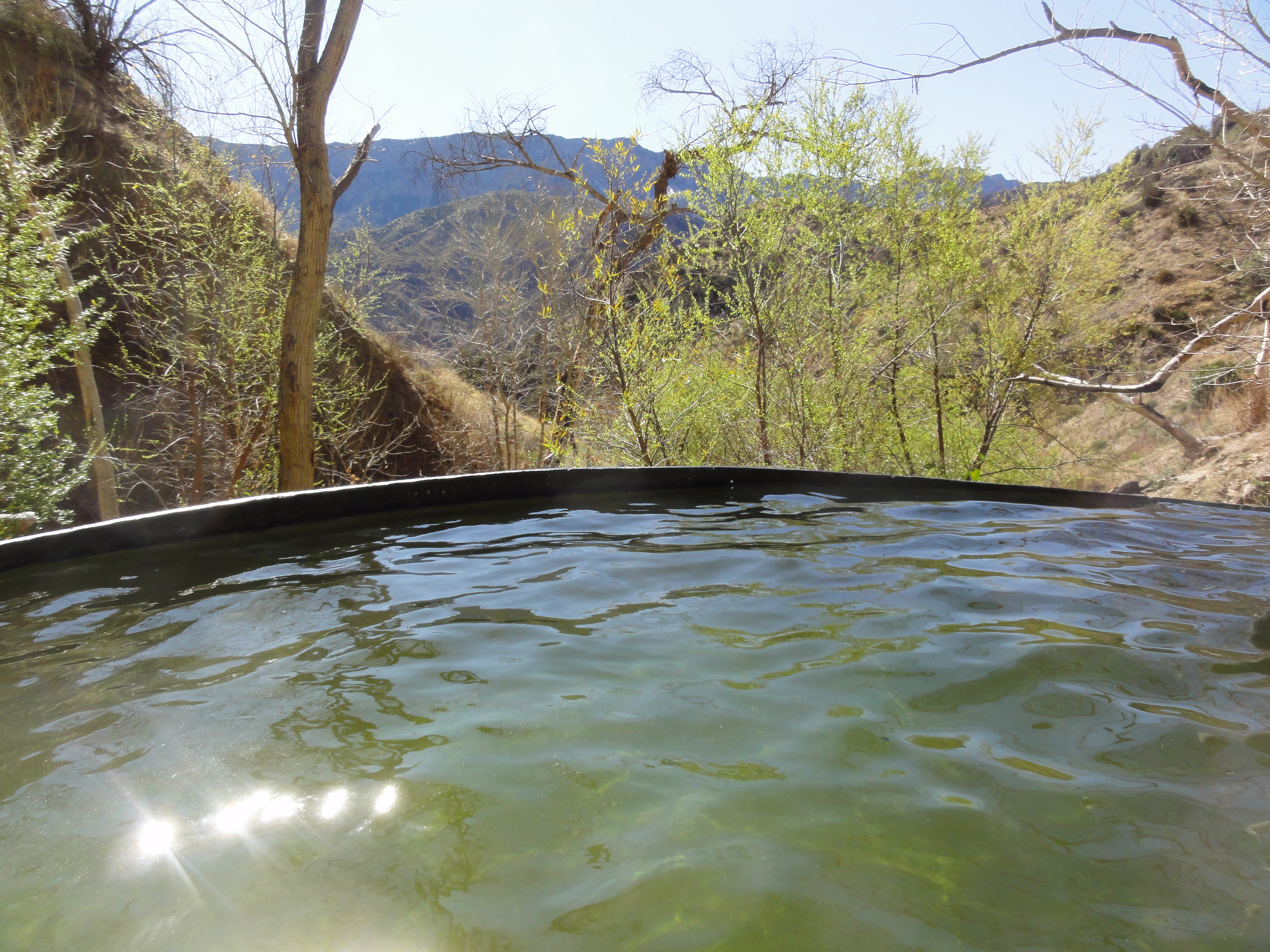
Willett Hot Springs: fed by hot springs.

Willett Hot Springs is located in the Sespe Wilderness, North of Ojai, California. This natural hot spring has been augmented by a man made collection basin. The most popular approach to the hot spring is by an approximate 11 miles (18 km) hike from the Piedra Blanca trailhead in Los Padres National Forest. Nearby Sespe Hot Springs (about 3 miles (4.8 km)) has a reputation as one of the hottest springs in California.
