= Sespe Creek =

Stream in California

Sespe Creek Arroyo Sespe, Cespai River, Sespe River
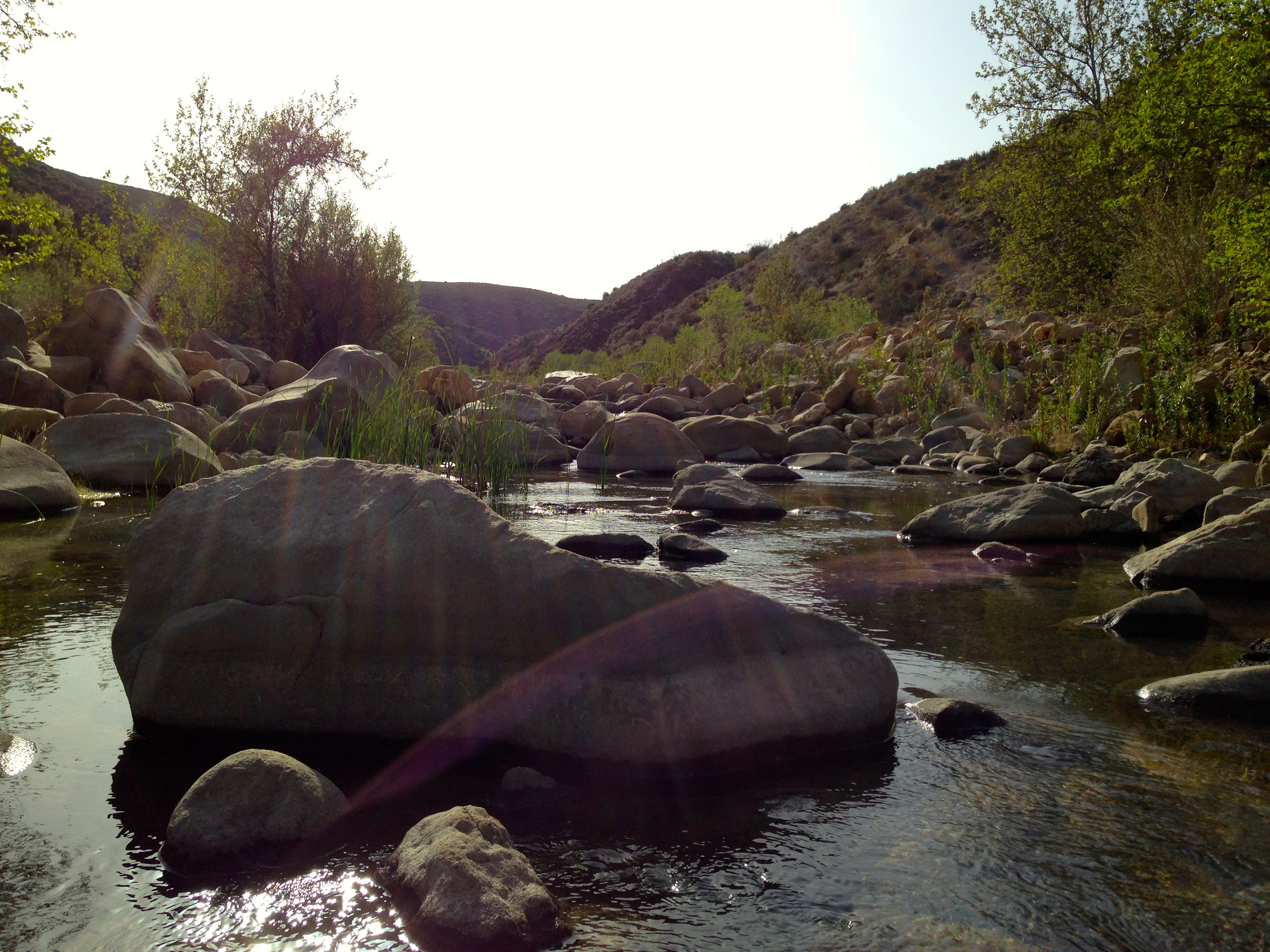
- Sespe Creek flowing through the Sespe Wilderness

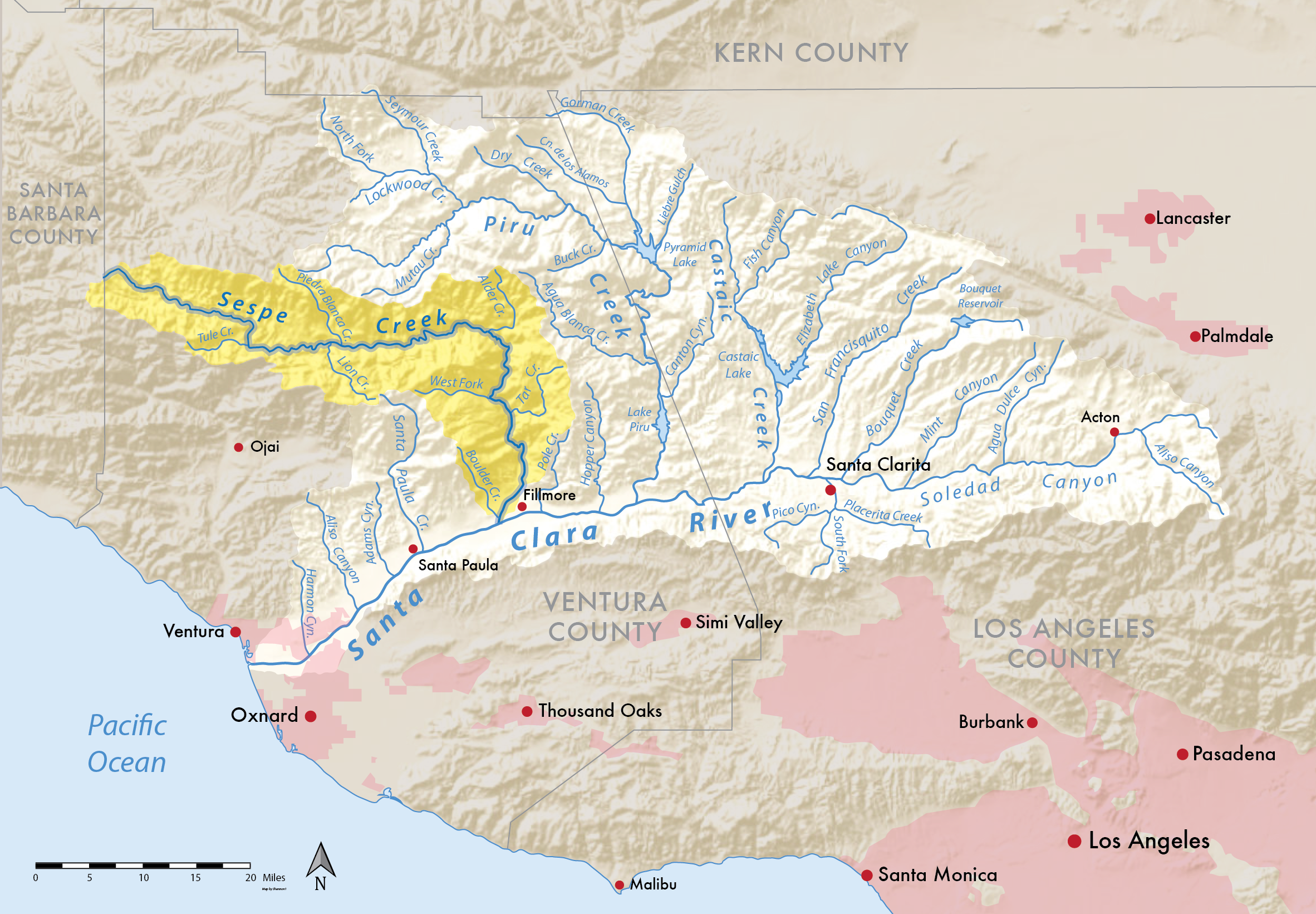
- Map showing Sespe Creek highlighted in the Santa Clara River watershed
- Native name: S'eqp'e' (Chumashan)

Location
- Country: United States
- State: California
- Region: Ventura County

Physical characteristics
- Source: San Emigdio Mountains
  - location: Potrero Seco Campground, Los Padres National Forest, California, United States
  - coordinates: 34°37′37″N 119°26′31″W
  - elevation: 5,280 ft (1,610 m)
- Mouth: Confluence with the Santa Clara River
  - location: Sespe, California and Fillmore, California, Ventura County, California
  - coordinates: 34°22′48″N 118°57′17″W
  - elevation: 355 ft (108 m)
- Length: 61 mi (98 km)
- Basin size: 260 sq mi (670 km^{2})
- Discharge
  - location: Fillmore, California
  - average: 126 cu ft/s (3.6 m^{3}/s)
  - minimum: 0 cu ft/s (0 m^{3}/s)
  - maximum: 85,300 cu ft/s (2,420 m^{3}/s)

Basin features
- Tributaries
  - left: Hot Springs Canyon
  - right: Lion Canyon, Timber Creek, West Fork Sespe Creek, Little Sespe Creek

National Wild and Scenic Rivers System
- Type: Wild, Scenic
- Designated: June 19, 1992

Sespe Creek (Chumash: S'eqp'e', "Kneecap") is a stream, some 61 miles (98 km) long, in Ventura County, Southern California, in the Western United States. The creek starts at Potrero Seco in the eastern Sierra Madre Mountains, and is formed by more than thirty tributary streams of the Sierra Madre and Topatopa Mountains, before it empties into the Santa Clara River in Fillmore.

31.5 miles of the creek were added to the National Wild and Scenic Rivers System in 1992 under the Los Padres Condor Range and River Protection Act.

The stream does not have dams or concrete channels. It is one of the last wild rivers in Southern California. It is primarily within the southern Los Padres National Forest.

The name Sespe can be traced to a Chumash Indian village, called Cepsey, Sek-pe or S'eqpe' ("Kneecap") in the Chumash language in 1791. The village appeared in a Mexican Alta California land grant called Rancho Sespe or Rancho San Cayetano in 1833.

== Watershed ==
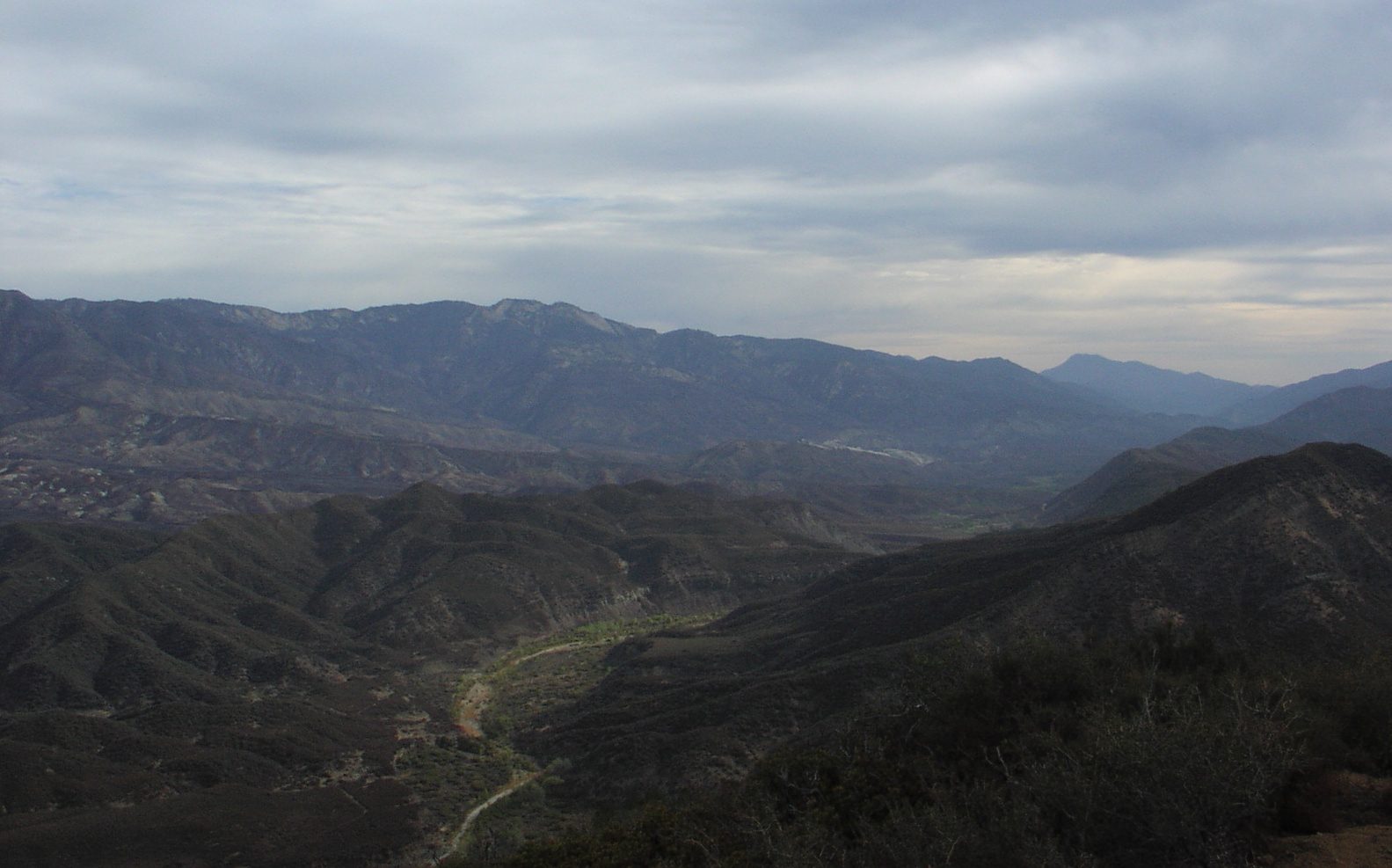
Upper Sespe Creek, from the top of Dry Lakes Ridge, looking east

The creek remains free from major habitat modifications and is noteworthy for its lack of dams, although one was originally proposed for a site named Topa Topa near Sespe Hot Springs in the Sespe Wilderness. After originating above 5,000 feet (1,500 m) in the Sierra Madre Mountains in the northwest corner of the Ojai Ranger District, about 75 percent of the Sespe Creek subwatershed is characterized by numerous rugged slopes and canyon walls of the southern Pine Mountains. It flows intermittently but is characterized by a series of permanent deep pools. Major tributaries include the Lion Canyon, Hot Springs Canyon, Timber, West Fork Sespe and Little Sespe Creeks, although over 30 creeks and springs nourish it. Sespe Creek receives most of its rainfall between January and April, and furnishes 40% of the water flowing in the Santa Clara River.

=== Conservation ===
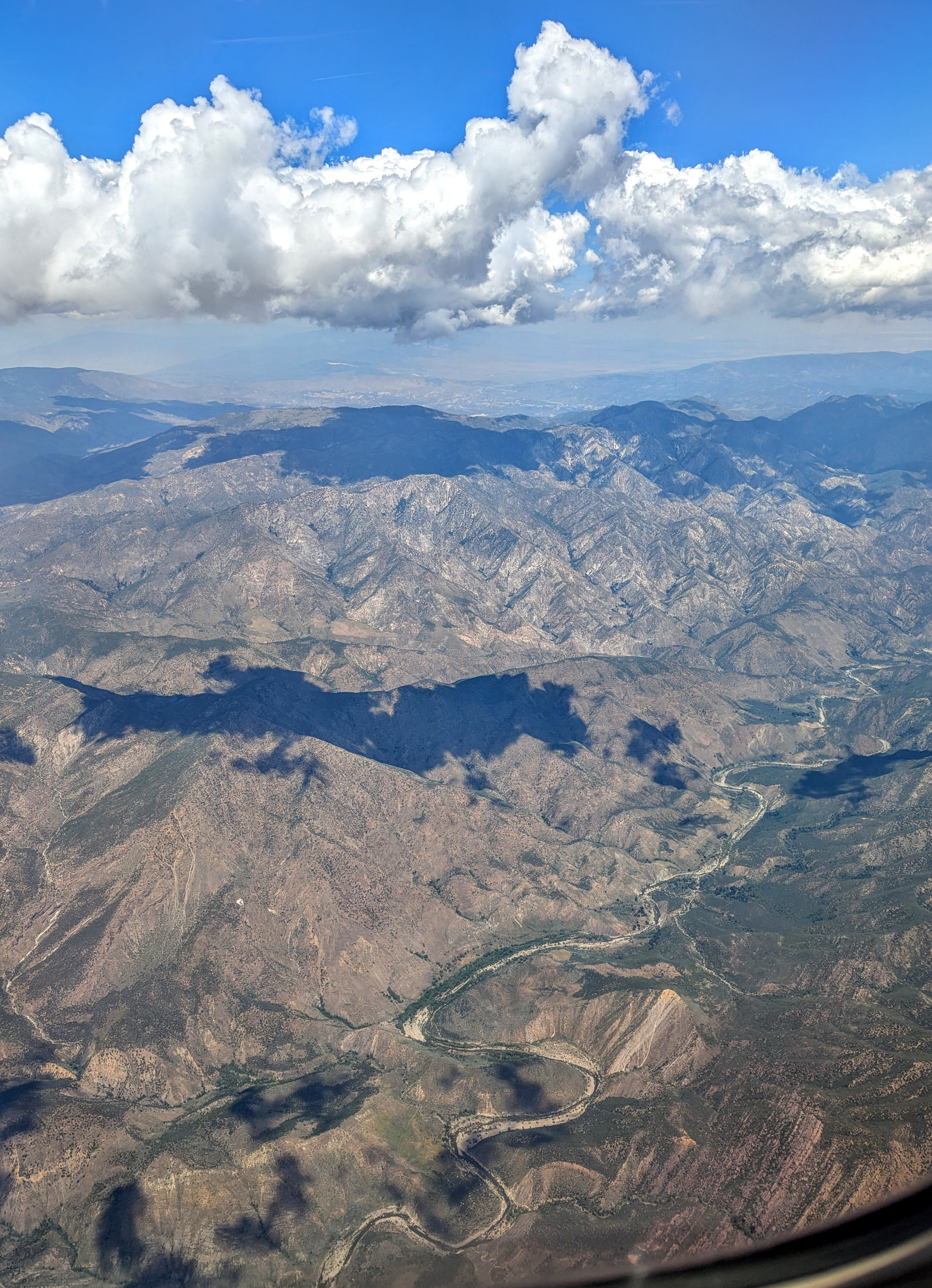
Aerial view of Sespe Creek and the Sespe Wilderness

Much of Sespe Creek is protected within the Los Padres National Forest. The approximately 219,700-acre (889 km^{2}) Sespe Wilderness encompasses 31.5 miles (50.7 km) of Sespe Creek. Established in 1992, the wilderness area contains a 53,000-acre (210 km^{2}) Sespe Condor Sanctuary. Approximately 10.5 miles (16.9 km) of upper Sespe Creek have been designated as wild and scenic. The stream is designated a Wild Trout Water for coastal rainbow trout from the Lion Camp area downstream to the Los Padres National Forest boundary north of Fillmore.

== Ecology ==
The Sespe Creek flows through habitats of the California montane chaparral and woodlands ecoregion, and Riparian woodlands.

The inaccessibility of the Sespe Creek backcountry, related to the Sespe gorge and flash floods which make roads through the gorge impossible to maintain, has made the area an apparent refuge for several species who were extirpated elsewhere in southern California, including the California condor, southern steelhead trout and possibly the California golden beaver. In addition, the California grizzly bear (Ursus arctos horribilis) held out in the Sespe area until at least 1905, when a forest ranger reported tracks and hunters claimed they saw a grizzly in the vicinity of the Sespe Hot Springs and Alder Creek.

The Sespe is one of southern California's last free-flowing southern Steelhead trout (Oncorhynchus mykiss irideus) streams.

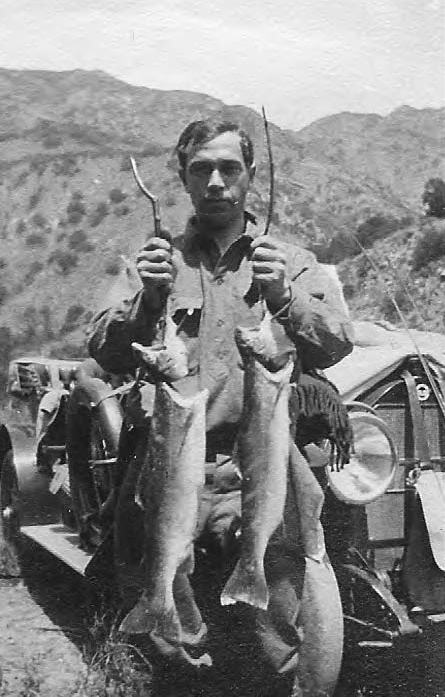
Fisherman with catch of southern Steelhead trout in lower Sespe Creek, by William A. Brown, winter, 1911

=== Endangered or rare species ===
The confluence of Sespe Creek with the Santa Clara River provides an important connection to upland systems and a potential migration corridor for four endangered species: southwestern willow flycatcher (Empidonax traillii extimus), least Bell's vireo (Vireo bellii pusillus), arroyo toad (Bufo microscaphus californicus), and California red-legged frog (Rana aurora draytonii). The Sespe Creek population is the largest known arroyo toad habitat within its current range.

California condor

The Sespe Creek watershed has the 53,000-acre (210 km^{2}) Sespe Condor Sanctuary created in 1947. It protects wilderness habitat of the critically endangered species, the Gymnogyps californianus (California condor).

California golden beaver

The discovery of a male adult California golden beaver (Castor canadensis subauratus) specimen collected as "wild caught" in May, 1906 (just prior to California instituting statewide protection from 1911 to 1925) "along the Sespe River in Ventura County" is physical evidence that golden beaver were historically extant in coastal streams in southern California. The skull of the Sespe Creek specimen is housed at the Museum of Vertebrate Zoology in Berkeley, California and was collected by John Hornung, of Ventura, California, who assembled a large private mammal collection of over 2,000 skulls and made major specimen donations to museums including the American Museum of Natural History. Although the California Department of Fish and Game re-introduced beaver throughout California the first documented restocking was 1923, well after the 1906 Sespe Creek specimen was collected.

The authenticity of the Sespe Creek specimen is supported by reports of beaver historically in the Santa Clara River until Europeans arrived, according to oral Ventureño Chumash history taken by ethnolinguist John Peabody Harrington in the early twentieth century.

The beaver comes and gnaws the tree on the side towards which it leans, and at last falls over. The tree is leaning towards our house. I am beginning to fear that it will fall on us. The beaver builds its house in the river or the cienegas in the time of our ancestors. There were beavers at Ventura and also at Saticoy.

Also, there is a Chumash pictograph of a beaver at Painted Rock in the Cuyama River watershed due west of Mt. Pinos in the Sierra Madre mountains, about 35 miles (56 km) from the Sespe Creek headwaters. Additionally, the Hearst Museum in Berkeley has a Ventureño Chumash shaman's rain making kit made from the skin of a beaver tail and a tobacco sack. The shaman, "Somik", produced the artifact in the 1870s and resided at Fort Tejon. It "was not used by his descendants". In Janice Timbrook's "Chumash Ethnobotany" she states, based on linguist J. P. Harrington's interview with Chumash elder Maria Soares, that the Indians near Tehachapi and also the Chumash believed that "a willow stick that had been cut by a beaver was thought to have the power to bring water. The Chumash would treat the stick with 'ayip ( a ritually powerful substance made from alum) and then plant it in the ground to create a permanent spring of water". In addition the Barbareño and Ventureño Chumash had a Beaver Dance. Finally, the Chumash word for beaver is Chipik, spelled "č'ǝpǝk'" in Barbareño and "tšǝ'pǝk" (Timothy Henry personal communication 2011-01-23), and "č'ɨpɨk" in Ineseño (Samala). Taken together, these facts support the hypothesis that beaver ranged throughout Santa Barbara County, California and Ventura County, California.

There is a Beaver Campground on Sespe Creek. Andy Bisaccia recalls taking Boy Scouts camping there between 1938 and 1944 and remembers seeing beaver, their dams, and lodges, and that they could be observed off of Highway 33 in that vicinity. Another eyewitness, a USFS Fire Crew Chief, James Jeffery, saw beaver dams about 1.5 miles above Beaver Camp in 1969-1970 (personal communication R. Bisaccia Jan. 2011). Alasdair Coyne reports seeing a beaver dam at Willett Hot Springs about ten miles east of Rose Valley on the Sespe, in 2000 (personal communication A. Coyne Jan. 2011).

=== Fish ===
At least twelve native and introduced fishes can be found in the creek:

- Arroyo chub – Gila orcuttii
- Pacific lamprey – Entosphenus tridentatus
- Prickly sculpin – Cottus asper
- Santa Ana sucker – Catostomus santaanae
- Steelhead trout – Oncorhynchus mykiss irideus
- Three-spined stickleback – Gasterosteus aculeatus
- Green sunfish – Lepomis cyanellus (introduced)
- Fathead minnow – Pimephales promelas (introduced)
- Black bullhead – Ameiurus melas (introduced)
- Mosquitofish – Gambusia affinis (introduced)
- Golden shiner – Notemigonus crysoleucas (introduced)
- Threadfin shad – Dorosoma petenense (introduced)
- Rainbow trout – Oncorhynchus mykiss (introduced)

A common fish in Sespe Creek is the threespine stickleback (Gasterosteus aculeatus), which is easily identified by its three dorsal spines.

The Pacific lamprey (Entosphenus tridentatus) enters Sespe Creek from the Santa Clara River, which flows into the Pacific Ocean.

The arroyo chub (Gila orcuttii) is often found in schools. The Santa Ana sucker (Catostomus santaanae) is common around waterfalls.

The introduced species, green sunfish (Lepomis cyanellus), can be found in shallow, weedy areas.

== See also ==
- Matilija Creek
- California Fur Rush
