= Sespe Condor Sanctuary =

Wildlife refuge in Ventura County, California

- IUCN category Ib (wilderness area)
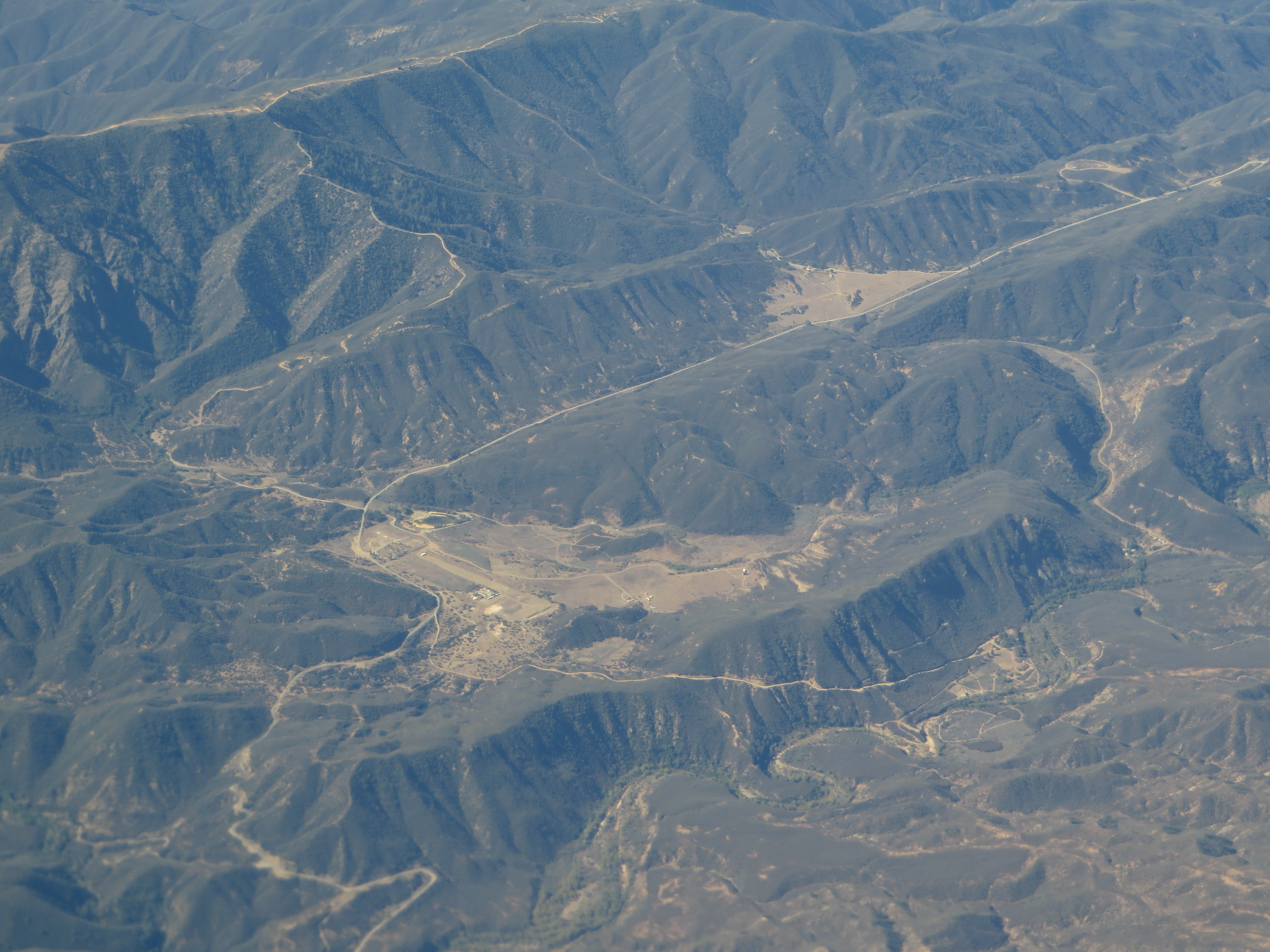
- The Topatopa Mountains within the Sespe Condor Sanctuary

- Location within southern California
- Location: Ventura County, California, United States
- Nearest city: Fillmore, California
- Coordinates: 34.492137°N 118.939790°W
- Area: 53,000-acre (210 km^{2})
- Elevation: 3,182 feet (970 m)
- Designation: Condor Sanctuary
- Created: 1947
- Owner: United States Department of Agriculture
- Administrator: United States Forest Service
- Website: Sespe Condor Sanctuary

The Sespe Condor Sanctuary is a 53,000-acre (210 km^{2}) wildlife refuge in the Topatopa Mountains, in northeastern Ventura County, California. It is within the Sespe Wilderness in the southern Los Padres National Forest.

== History ==
The United States Forest Service established the Sespe Condor Sanctuary in 1947 for the California condor, an endangered species which is the largest living bird in North America.

On January 14, 1992, two captive-bred California condors and two Andean condors were released into the Sespe Condor Sanctuary, overlooking the Sespe Creek, near Fillmore, California. This was done by the U.S. Fish and Wildlife Service's Hopper Mountain National Wildlife Refuge Complex, the lead office for the California Condor Recovery Program. These captive-bred condors thrived in the wild and have begun to reproduce freely.

Before the sanctuary was established, numerous condors were killed by power line collisions. In order to circumvent this mishap, the captive condors were treated with "mock power poles" through the power pole aversion program. These poles emitted mild shocks when landed upon. They quickly learned to avoid power poles, which has significantly reduced their mortality rate.

== California Condor Recovery Program ==
The California Condor Recovery Program is in effect in California, Arizona, and Baja. According to the 2024 annual report, there are over 550 California condors in the world, with nearly 370 flying free in the wild. California has four release sites, of which the Sespe Condor Sanctuary is one. With the advent of more natural condor births, more release sites are in the works.

== See also ==
- Sespe Creek
- Fishes of Sespe Creek, California
- National Wildlife Refuges in California
- Topatopa Mountains
