= Los Padres National Forest =

National forest in California, United States

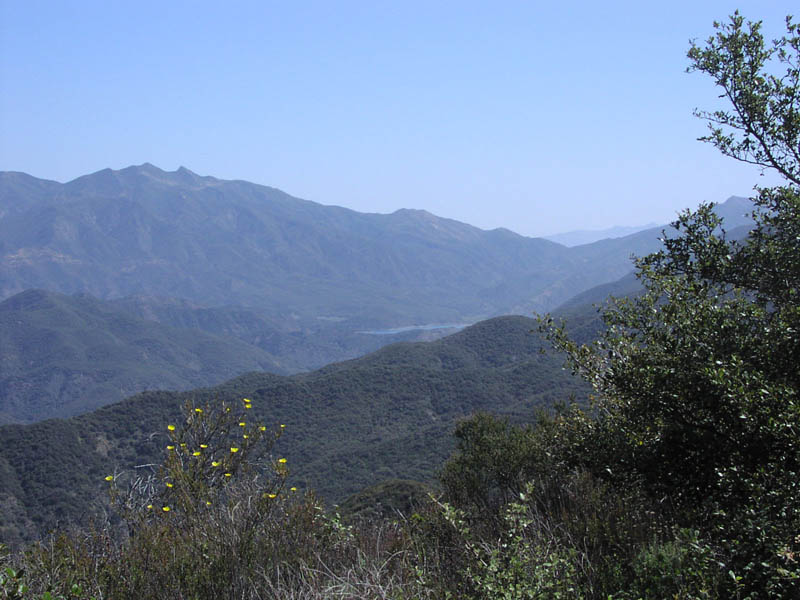
- Jameson Reservoir (center), Santa Ynez Mountains (right), Los Padres back country and Old Man Mountain (left), Reyes Peak (background)
- Interactive map of Los Padres National Forest
- Location: California
- Nearest city: Santa Barbara, Big Sur, Ojai, San Luis Obispo, Solvang and Santa Ynez
- Coordinates: 34°40′N 119°45′W
- Area: 2,970 sq mi (7,700 km^{2})
- Established: December 1936
- Governing body: U.S. Forest Service
- Website: Los Padres National Forest

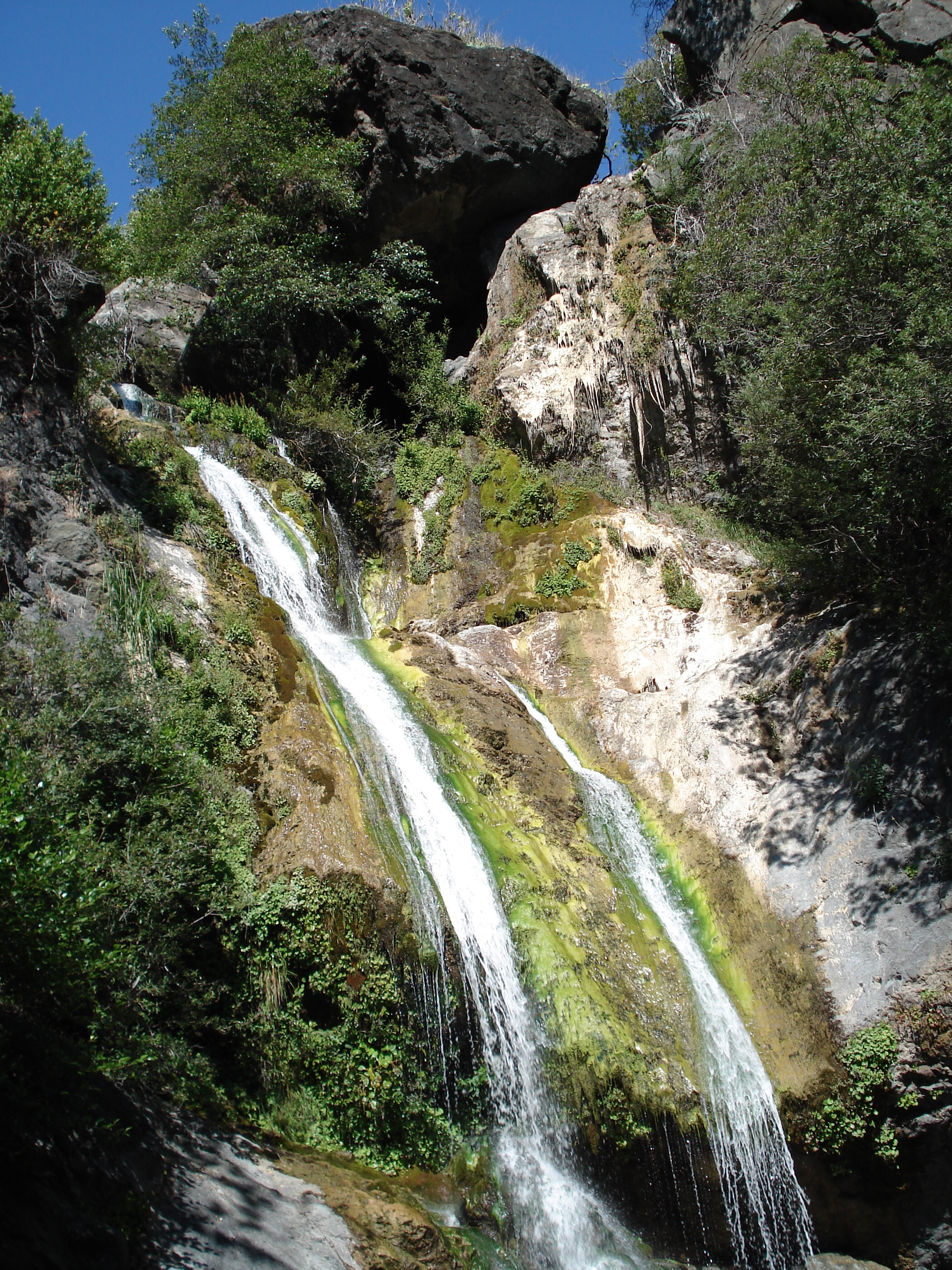
Salmon Creek Falls, near the Big Sur coast, just outside the Ventana Wilderness

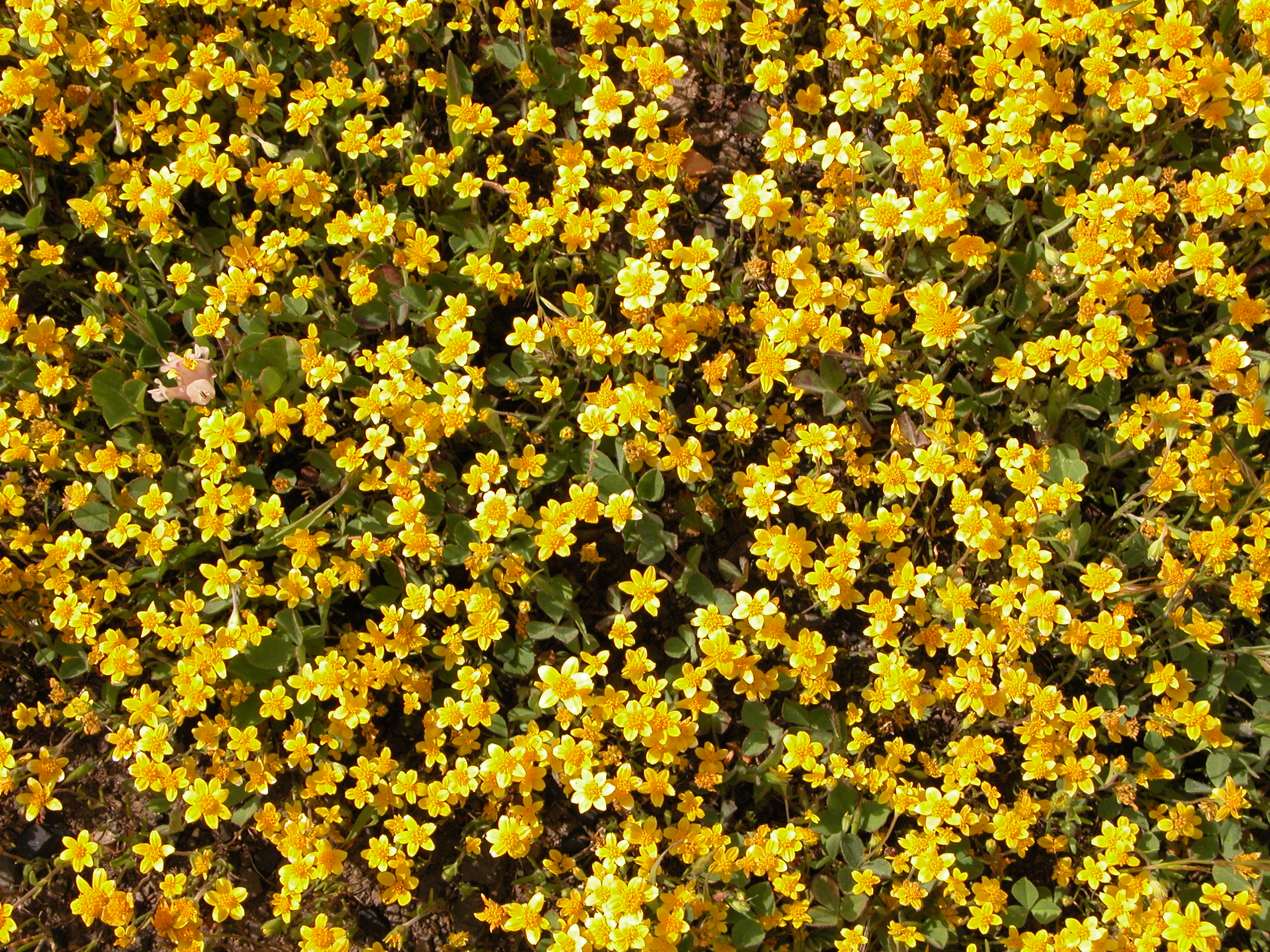
Figueroa Mountain wildflowers, 2005

Los Padres National Forest is a United States national forest in southern and central California. Administered by the United States Forest Service, Los Padres includes most of the mountainous land along the California coast from Ventura to Monterey, extending inland. Elevations range from sea level to 8,847 feet (2,697 m).

== Geography ==
The forest is approximately 3,050 square miles (7,900 km^{2}) in area, of which 2,750 square miles (7,100 km^{2}) or about 88% are public lands; the rest are privately owned inholdings.

The forest is divided into two non-contiguous areas separated approximately 40 to 50 miles (64 to 80 km) from one another. The northern division lies within Monterey County and includes the Big Sur Coast and its scenic interior areas. This is a very popular area for hiking, with 323 miles (520 km) of hiking trails and 11 campgrounds (ranging from very rugged to suitable for recreational vehicles).

The larger, so called main section of Los Padres lies further south, within San Luis Obispo, Santa Barbara, Ventura and Kern Counties, with a small extension into Los Angeles County in the Pyramid Lake area, between Castaic and Gorman. The Santa Ynez Mountains, which are within the Los Padres, rise above the Gaviota Coast, a series of alluvial plains along the last undeveloped stretch of the Southern California coastline. Other mountain ranges within the Los Padres include the Santa Lucia Mountains, La Panza Range, Caliente Range (a small part), Sierra Madre Mountains, San Rafael Mountains, Topatopa Mountains, and a tiny section of the Sierra Pelona Mountains; the highest parts of the forest are not within named mountain ranges, but are adjacent to the western San Emigdio Mountains and include Mount Pinos, Cerro Noroeste, and Reyes Peak. The forest is also adjacent to the Angeles National Forest, which is in Los Angeles County in Southern California and is nearby Carrizo Plain National Monument in eastern San Luis Obispo County. Forest headquarters are located in Goleta, California. There are local ranger district offices in Frazier Park, King City, Ojai, Santa Barbara, and Santa Maria.

Many rivers in Southern and Central California have their points of origin within the Los Padres National Forest, including the Carmel, Salinas, Cuyama, Sisquoc, Santa Ynez, Coyote Creek, Sespe, Ventura, and Piru.

Several wilderness areas have been set aside within the Los Padres National Forest, including the San Rafael Wilderness, the first primitive area to be included in the U.S. wilderness system after the passage of the Wilderness Act in 1964. Another large wilderness created in the 1970s was the Ventana Wilderness in the Santa Lucia Mountains. The Los Padres Condor Range and River Protection Act of 1992 expanded existing wilderness by 132 mi^{2} (340 km^{2}) and designated 494 mi^{2} (1,280 km^{2}) of new wilderness that provides habitat for the condor. A total of 48% of the total area within the forest has a wilderness designation.

=== Wilderness areas ===
- San Rafael Wilderness (304 mi^{2} (790 km^{2}))
- Ventana Wilderness (375 mi^{2} (970 km^{2}))
- Garcia Wilderness (22 mi^{2} (57 km^{2}) in the Lucia District)
- Santa Lucia Wilderness (32 mi^{2} (83 km^{2}) in the Lucia District, in the Santa Lucia Mountains)
- Machesna Mountain Wilderness (31 mi^{2} (80 km^{2}), in the La Panza Range in San Luis Obispo County)
- Silver Peak Wilderness (49 mi^{2} (130 km^{2}), in the Monterey District)
- Dick Smith Wilderness (101.25 mi^{2} (262.2 km^{2}) in the Santa Barbara Ranger District)
- Chumash Wilderness (60 mi^{2} (160 km^{2}) in the Mt. Pinos Ranger District, just west of Mount Pinos)
- Sespe Wilderness (343 mi^{2} (890 km^{2}), in both the Ojai and Mt. Pinos Ranger Districts)
- Matilija Wilderness (46.25 mi^{2} (119.8 km^{2}) in the Ojai Ranger District)

=== Recreation areas ===
Parts of the National Forest are designated as recreation areas. There are three recreation areas,

- Figueroa Mountain Recreation Area
- Sage Hill Group Recreation Area
- Santa Ynez Recreation Area, in the Santa Barbara Ranger District.

== Wildlife and vegetation ==
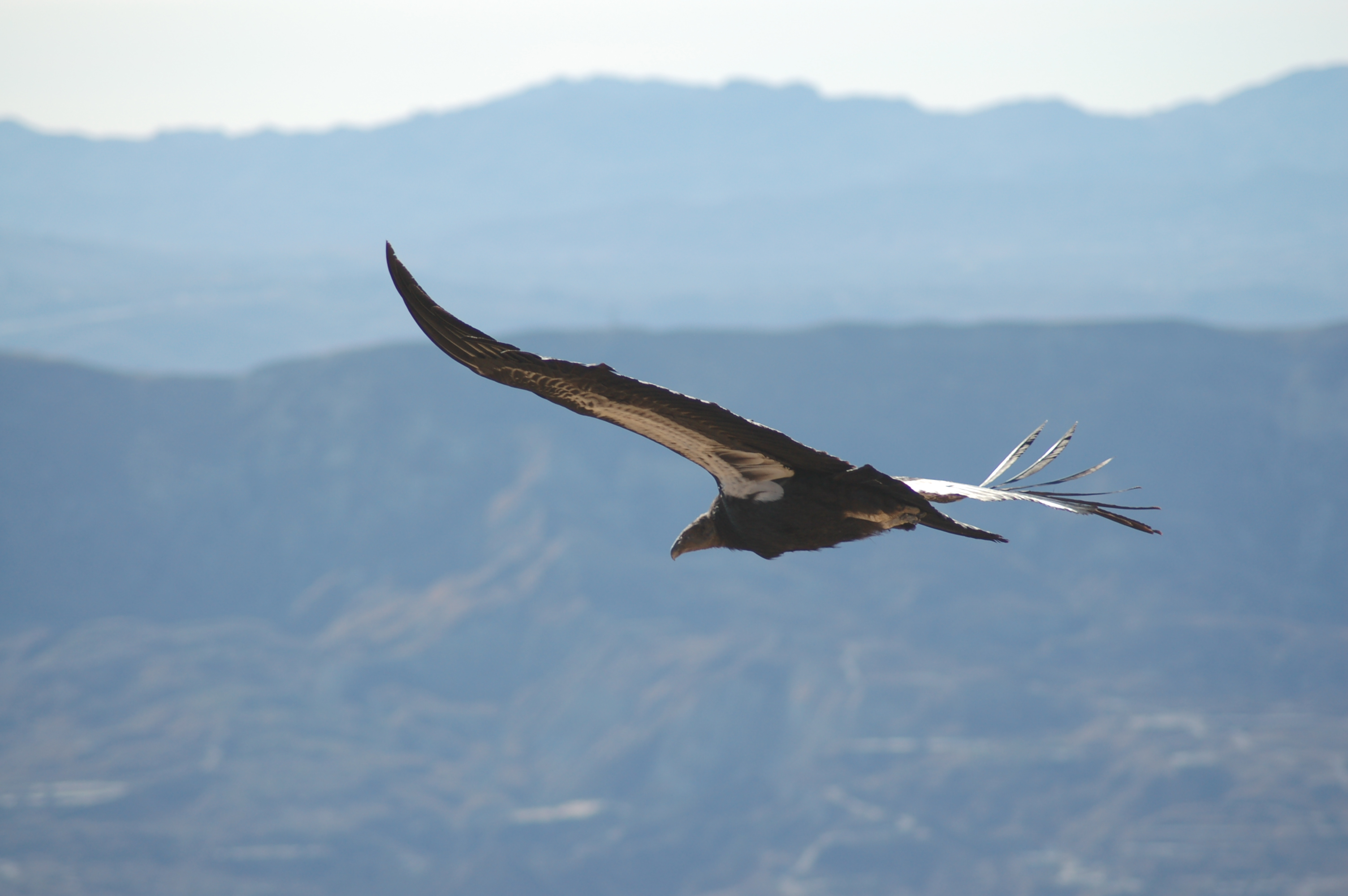
California condor soaring over Los Padres National Forest

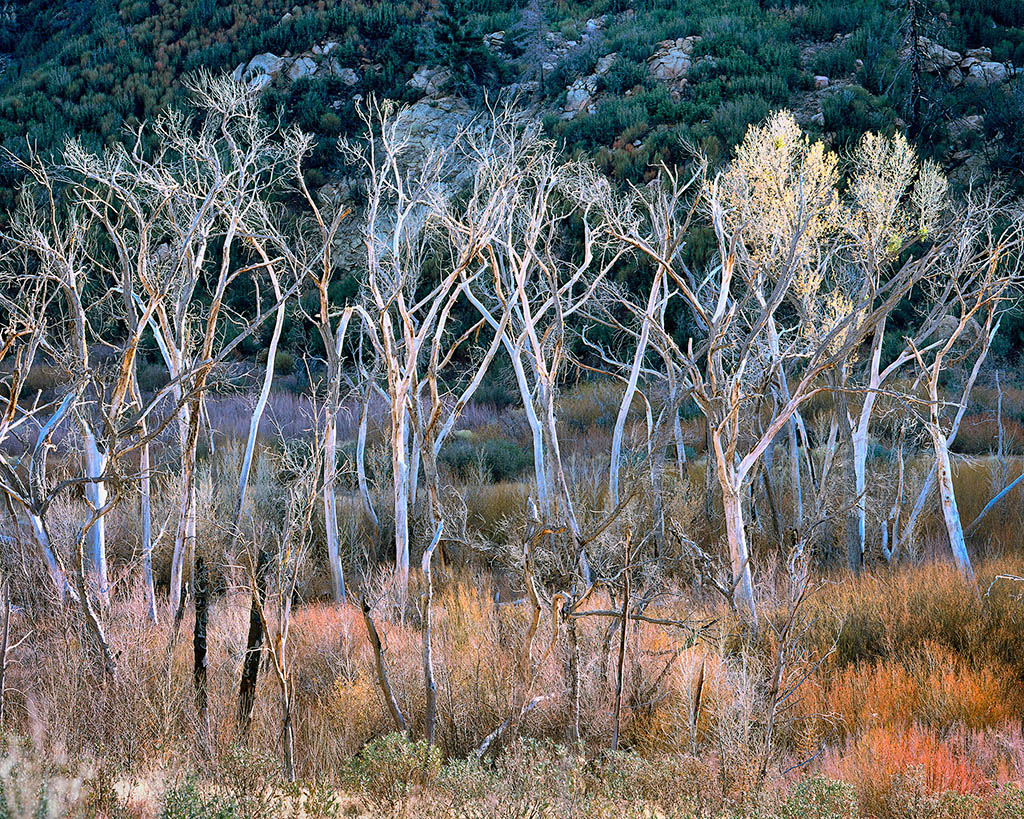
Trees in the Sespe Wilderness

Many threatened and endangered species live within the forest. Among them is the California condor (Gymnogyps californianus), for whom the United States Forest Service manages the Sespe Condor Sanctuary and the Sisquoc Condor Sanctuary. Also present is the California mountain kingsnake, a California species of special concern. The American peregrine falcon is also entirely dependent on the forest for its survival. The mountain lion and California mule deer may be the most common large mammals. Bighorn sheep inhabit the Sespe Creek region of the forest. American black bears browse on grasses, berries, and carrion. Coyotes thrive everywhere in this forest. Bobcats can occasionally be seen in the more remote mountainous areas of the forest. Other animals found in this forest are raccoons, bluebirds, barn owls, red-tailed hawks, cottontail rabbits, bald eagles, jack rabbits, California quail, California scrub jays, and great horned owls.

Many vegetation types are represented in the Los Padres, including chaparral, the common ground cover of most coastal ranges in California below about 5,000 feet (1,500 m), and coniferous forests, which can be found in abundance in the Ventana Wilderness as well as the region around Mount Pinos in northern Ventura County.

Researchers estimate the extent of old growth in the forest is 18,900 acres (76 km^{2}). It consists largely of Jeffrey pine (Pinus jeffreyi) forests, although old-growth coast redwood (Sequoia Sempervirens), coast Douglas-fir (Pseudotsuga menziesii var. menziesii), and white fir (Abies concolor) are also found there. In 2008, scientist J. Michael Fay published a map of old growth redwoods in and around Big Sur as a result of his transect of the entire redwood range.

== Management ==
The Forest Service conducts prescribed burns when favorable weather conditions are present; temperatures must be below 80 degrees, winds lower than 15 miles per hour and relative humidity needs to be above 20 percent.

The U.S. Forest Service decided in May 2020 to thin 755 acres (306 ha) of land to reduce wildfire risk, most of which is within the national forest. The decision memo states the project aims "to improve forest health by reducing mortality risk, provide safe and effective locations from which to perform fire suppression operations, to slow the spread of a wildland fire". The Reyes Peak Forest Health and Fuels Reduction Project is roughly 30 miles (48 km) north of Ojai in the Reyes Peak area on Pine Mountain in Ventura County. Seven environmental groups, the city of Ojai and Ventura County filed three lawsuits in federal court in April 2022 to stop the brush clearance and logging operation. The suit was dismissed with prejudice on July 19, 2023 by a federal judge.

== Access ==
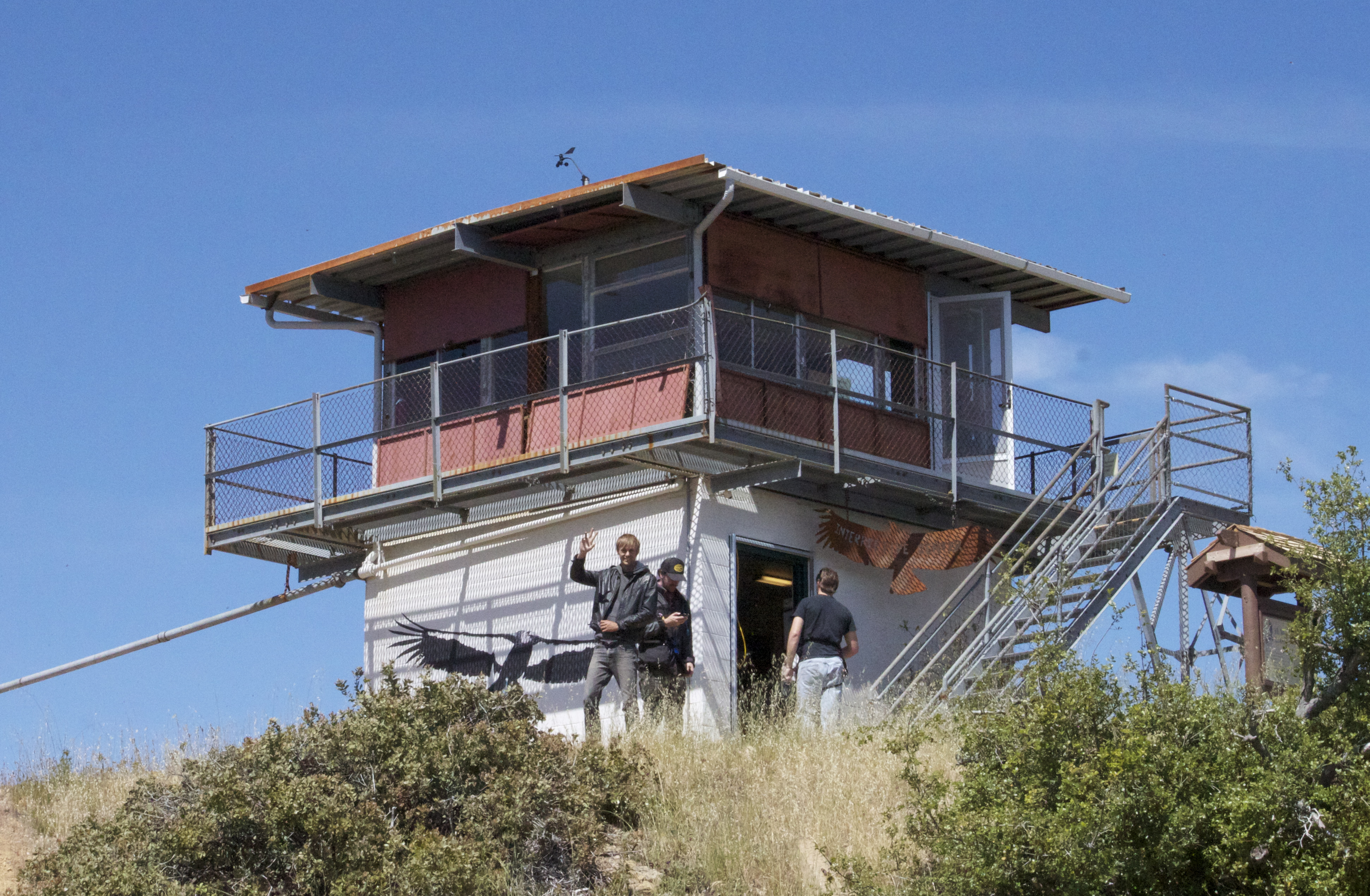
Condor Lookout on Hi Mountain, Santa Lucia Range. This is an old fire lookout, remodeled into a public Condor lookout and educational center.

Due to the fire risk, there are seasonal restrictions on building fires. Some portions of the forest are closed entirely to public entry during the peak fire season, which usually extends from around June 1 to mid-November.

A National Forest Adventure Pass is required for parking in most locations of the Los Padres National Forest, as well as other National Forests in Southern California. The pass is not required in the Monterey Ranger District including Ventana Wilderness and Silver Peak Wilderness.

Restrictions were put in place at times during the COVID-19 pandemic due to crowded conditions in which people were unable to social distance and also the resulting litter and human waste that was left behind.

== History ==
Los Padres was named Santa Barbara National Forest until December 3, 1936, and was assembled from a number of smaller National Forests, including:

- Monterey National Forest (est. June 25, 1906), absorbed by Santa Barbara on August 18, 1919, and which itself had absorbed:
  - Pinnacles National Forest (est. July 18, 1906)
  - San Benito National Forest (est. October 26, 1907)
- San Luis National Forest (est. July 1, 1908), which had absorbed part of:
  - San Luis Obispo National Forest (est. June 25, 1906)
- San Gabriel National Forest (part) (est. December 20, 1892)
- Pine Mountain and Zaka Lake Forest Reserve, (est. March 2, 1898) combined with Santa Ynez on December 22, 1903, to create Santa Barbara Forest Reserve
- Santa Ynez Forest Reserve, (est. October 2, 1899)

After the consolidation of the forests, the name Santa Barbara Forest was resented by residents of the other counties for being too closely identified with just the one county. Amidst public pressure, administrators therefore changed the name to Los Padres to be more representative of the regional history. Los Padres means "the Fathers", referring to the Catholic missionary priests of the Spanish missions who proselytized in and around the area in the 18th and 19th centuries.

=== Fires ===
Due to the very dry summers, forest fires in Los Padres National Forest are always a risk. In 1965, a truck driven by country singer Johnny Cash caught fire, and burned several hundred acres in Ventura County. In August 1977, the Marble Cone Fire burned 178,000 acres (720 km^{2}) within the Ventana Wilderness and other portions of the Los Padres Forest. In June and July, 2008, the Basin Complex Fire torched 162,818 acres (658.90 km^{2}) in the same region.

The Thomas Fire was a massive wildfire that traversed the forest within Ventura and Santa Barbara Counties. It was one of multiple wildfires that ignited in southern California in December 2017. The unusually strong and persistent Santa Ana winds were the largest factor in the spread of the fire. The region experienced an on-and-off Santa Ana wind event for a little over two weeks, which contributed to the Thomas Fire's persistent growths in size. At its height, the wildfire was powerful enough to generate its own weather, qualifying it as a firestorm.

In August 2025, multiple small blazes along a stretch of Highway 166 combined into the Gifford Fire. Located east of Santa Maria in San Luis Obispo and Santa Barbara Counties, the fire grew to be the largest of the season so far. The fire burned mainly within the national forest with much of the hilly area being inaccessible to bulldozers.

=== Marijuana grows ===
Illegal farming of cannabis in secluded areas has been a problem for a long time in the forest. The practice continues under legalization as the crops are produced for the unregulated market without testing for the illegal pesticides they may be contaminated with. These operations often use pesticides and leave piles of trash such as drip irrigation tubing.

== See also ==
- Camp Scheideck, California
- List of national forests of the United States
