= Santa Cruz Trail =

Hiking trail in California

- National Recreation Trail
- Length: 21.5 mi (34.6 km)
- Location: Los Padres National Forest
- Trailheads: Buckhorn-Camuesa Road; 34.5648°N 119.7657°W; Mission Pine Trail; 34.7080°N 119.7466°W
- Use: Hiking; Mountain biking Stock travel
- Highest point: Mission Pine Basin, 5,350 ft (1,630 m)
- Lowest point: Oso Creek, 1,160 ft (350 m)
- Difficulty: Strenuous
- Season: All year
- Sights: San Rafael Mountains
- Hazards: Overexertion; Dehydration

The Santa Cruz Trail is a trail in the Los Padres National Forest, in Santa Barbara County, California. It is the primary footpath from the Santa Ynez Recreation Area into the San Rafael and Dick Smith Wilderness areas. The section from the southern trailhead up to Santa Cruz Camp is designated as the Santa Cruz–Aliso National Recreation Trail.

== Description ==
The trail begins at the Buckhorn-Camuesa Road near the Upper Oso Campground and heads north through the San Rafael Mountains, climbing to near the summit of Little Pine Mountain at Alexander Saddle, before dropping down into the Santa Cruz Creek drainage, which includes a number of campsites. One of these campsites, Santa Cruz Camp, contains a Forest Service guard station. The Santa Cruz Trail, no longer a National Recreation Trail, then ascends to the high ridge of the San Rafael Mountains, reaching its highest point near its junction with the Mission Pine Trail.
