= Hurricane Deck (California) =

Mountain range in Santa Barbara County, California

- Location within California Location within the United States

Highest point
- Peak: Peak 4237
- Elevation: 4,237 ft (1,291 m)

Dimensions
- Length: 7.5 mi (12.1 km)

Geography
- Country: United States
- State: California
- District: Santa Barbara County
- Range coordinates: 34°48′N 119°54′W

Geology
- Rock age: Miocene

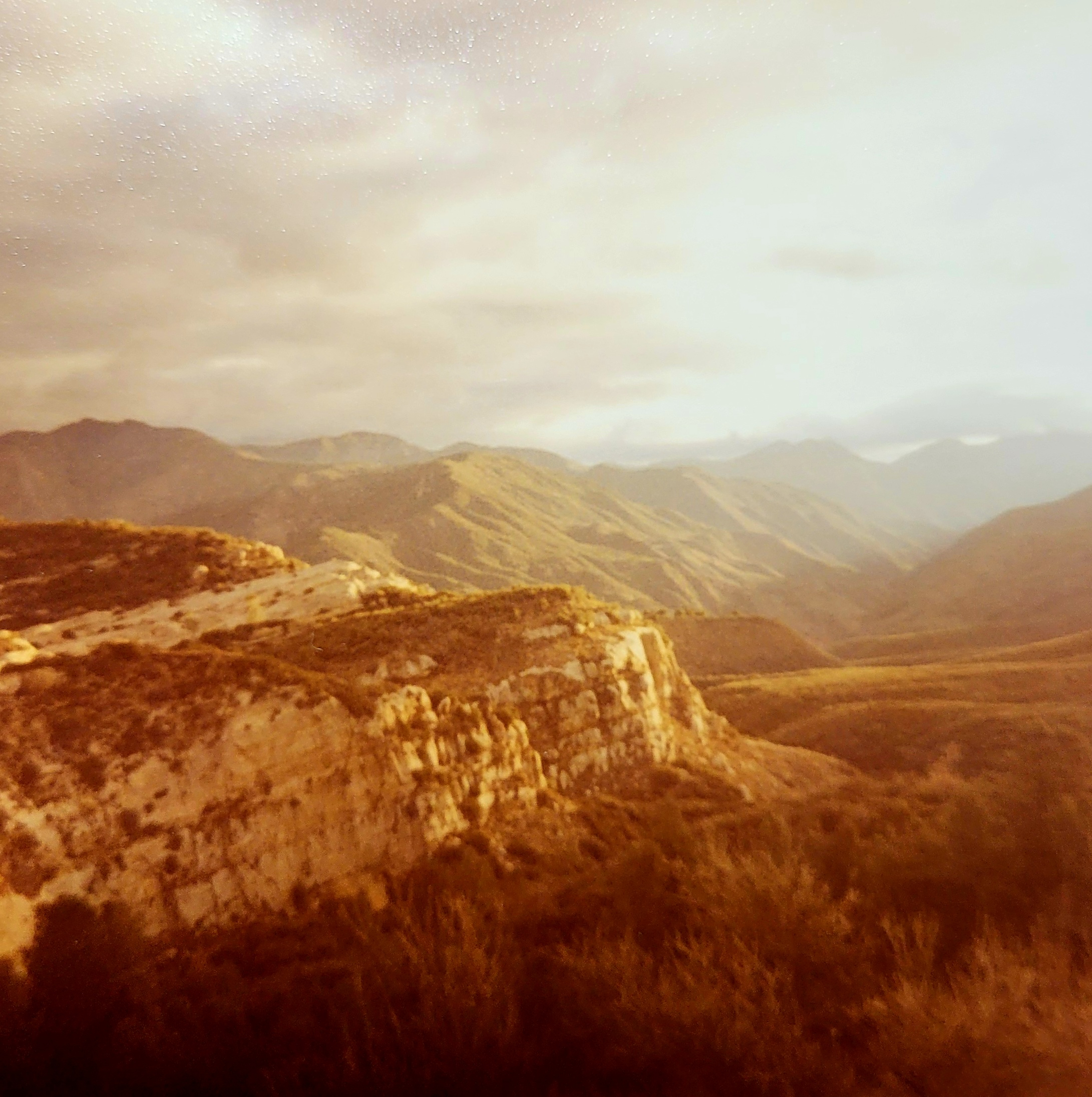

Hurricane Deck is a short mountain range in Santa Barbara County, California in the Los Padres National Forest. The range lies entirely in the San Rafael Wilderness and separates the drainages of the main stem of the Sisquoc River from its tributary, Manzana Creek. It is the northernmost subrange of the San Rafael Mountains; to the north lies the Sierra Madre Mountains.

The range is a single block of a unique marine sandstone deposit of Miocene age. As such, it possible to view the ridge as a single extremely large mountain (massif).

The ridgeline is traversed by the Hurricane Deck Trail, which is rarely maintained.
