= Sisquoc River =

Siquoc River Arroyo De Siquico
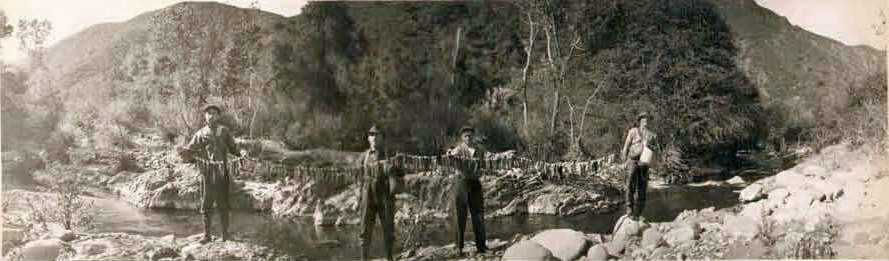
- Stringer of Steelhead Trout on Upper Sisquoc River in 1916

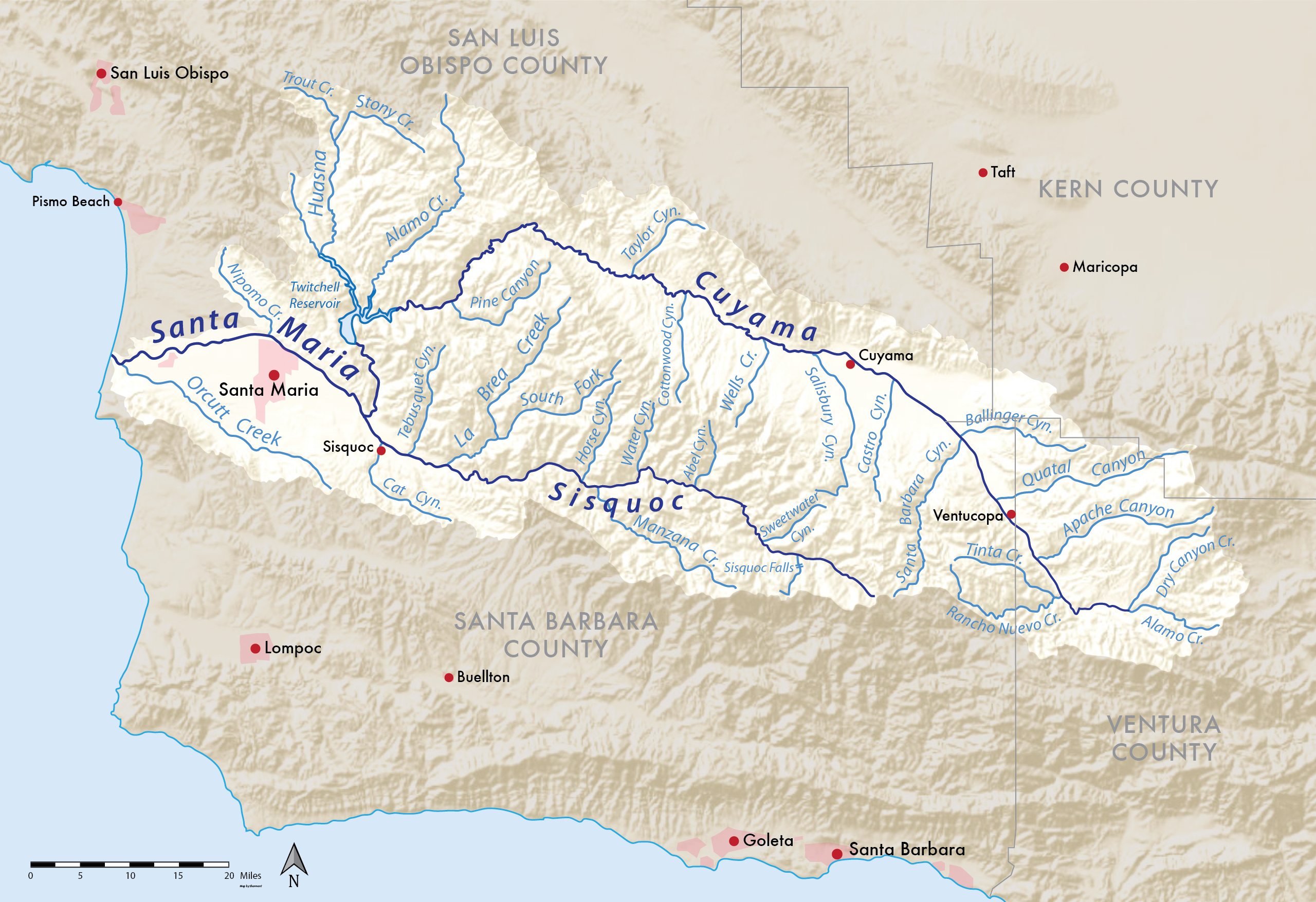
- Map of the Santa Maria River watershed, including the Sisquoc River

Location
- Country: United States
- State: California
- Region: Santa Barbara County, San Luis Obispo County
- Cities: Sisquoc, Garey

Physical characteristics
- Source
  - location: Big Pine Mountain, Los Padres National Forest
  - coordinates: 34°41′42″N 119°38′17″W
  - elevation: 6,320 ft (1,930 m)
- Mouth
  - location: Confluence with Cuyama River
  - coordinates: 34°54′11″N 120°18′45″W
  - elevation: 354 ft (108 m)

Basin features
- Tributaries
  - left: Big Pine Canyon, Rattlesnake Canyon (Santa Barbara), Fall Canyon, South Fork Sisquoc River, Big Bend Canyon, Miller Canyon, Bald Mountain Canyon, Manzana Creek, Lion Canyon, Wildhorse Canyon, Bee Rock Canyon, Round Corral Canyon, Foxen Canyon, Olivera Canyon, Long Canyon
  - right: Judell Canyon, Logan Canyon, Cliff Canyon, Sweetwater Canyon, Foresters Leap Canyon, Mine Canyon, Abel Canyon, Oak Canyon, Wellman Canyon, Water Canyon, Burro Canyon, Horse Canyon, Rattlesnake Canyon, Tunnel Canyon, Alkali Canyon, La Brea Canyon

National Wild and Scenic River
- Type: Wild
- Designated: June 19, 1992

The Sisquoc River is a westward flowing river in northeastern Santa Barbara County, California. It is a tributary of the Santa Maria River, which is formed when the Sisquoc River meets the Cuyama River at the Santa Barbara County and San Luis Obispo County border just north of Garey. The river is 57.4 miles (92.4 km) long and originates on the north slopes of Big Pine Mountain, at approximately 6,320 feet (1,930 m). Big Pine Mountain is part of the San Rafael Mountains, which are part of the Transverse Ranges.

== History ==
"Sisquoc" is a Chumash word meaning "quail". The river is shown on an 1846 diseño of the Rancho Cuyama grant as Arroyo de Siquico.

== Watershed ==
The Sierra Madre Mountains form the watershed's boundary to the north, while the San Rafael Mountains form the southern boundary. The first half of the river, in the Los Padres National Forest, specifically the San Rafael Wilderness, travels roughly northwest. Outside of the National Forest, the river flows roughly west to its confluence with the Cuyama River, about 20 miles upstream from the Pacific Ocean. The river is completely free flowing and does not have any diversions. Its sole dam is a 3-meter dam on Horse Canyon, one of its tributaries, but it is filled with sediment and causes little restriction to the river's overall flow. It is designated as a wild and scenic river in the National Wild and Scenic Rivers System.

The watershed has a Mediterranean climate and chaparral vegetation. Annual precipitation in the watershed varies from 13 to 38 inches, 95% of which falls between November and April. This means that the river is dry part of the year, as there are no reservoirs to store water. The lack of rain also causes the vegetation to get very dry and the fire hazard can be very high during the summer.

== Ecology ==
Southern Steelhead trout (Oncorhynchus mykiss) are thought to represent about 1% of the historic population and most of the Santa Maria River run is thought to have continued up the Sisquoc River to spawn. Major dams on the Santa Ynez, Ventura, and Santa Clara Rivers prevent steelhead from accessing hundreds of miles of habitat and have drastically reduced the steelhead runs. The construction of Twitchell Dam on the Cuyama River in the late 1950s blocked at least 264 miles of stream and more than 60% of the Santa Maria River watershed and tributary habitat found upstream. This makes the Sisquoc River, which remains undammed, an important stream for surviving southern steelhead populations.

Removal of dams on Sisquoc River tributaries expands the potential for restoration of steelhead. One tributary, Horse Creek (Horse Canyon), was dammed in 1968 and the 4.5 foot high, 60 foot wide dam eventually created a scour pool, increasing the drop to over 8 feet and creating an impassable barrier to spawning steelhead. The dam had completely silted in and no longer served to restrain sediment flows so was dynamited in 2006, and its sediment naturally eroded by 2011. A beaver dam created a large pool at the confluence of Horse Creek and the Sisquoc River and abundant steelhead trout were noted in a snorkel survey by fish biologist Matt Stoecker, including three fish 9 to 14 inches in size.

The discovery of a male adult California Golden beaver (Castor canadensis subauratus) specimen collected as "wild caught" in 1906 "along the Sespe River in Ventura County" is physical evidence that Golden beaver were historically extant in coastal streams in southern California. The Sisquoc River used to receive steelhead running up from the Pacific Ocean via the Santa Maria River, but water removed by Twitchell Reservoir has interrupted the connection.

== Zaca Fire ==
The Zaca Fire burned a large portion of the Sisqoc River watershed in the summer of 2007.

== See also ==
- List of rivers of California
- List of National Wild and Scenic Rivers
- Sisquoc Falls
