= Dick Smith Wilderness =

Protected wilderness area in California, United States

- IUCN category Ib (wilderness area)
- Location within southern California Location within California Location within the United States
- Interactive map of Dick Smith Wilderness
- Location: Santa Barbara / Ventura counties, California, United States
- Nearest city: Ojai, California
- Coordinates: 34°40′0″N 119°30′0″W
- Area: 64,700 acres (26,200 ha)
- Established: 1984
- Governing body: U.S. Forest Service

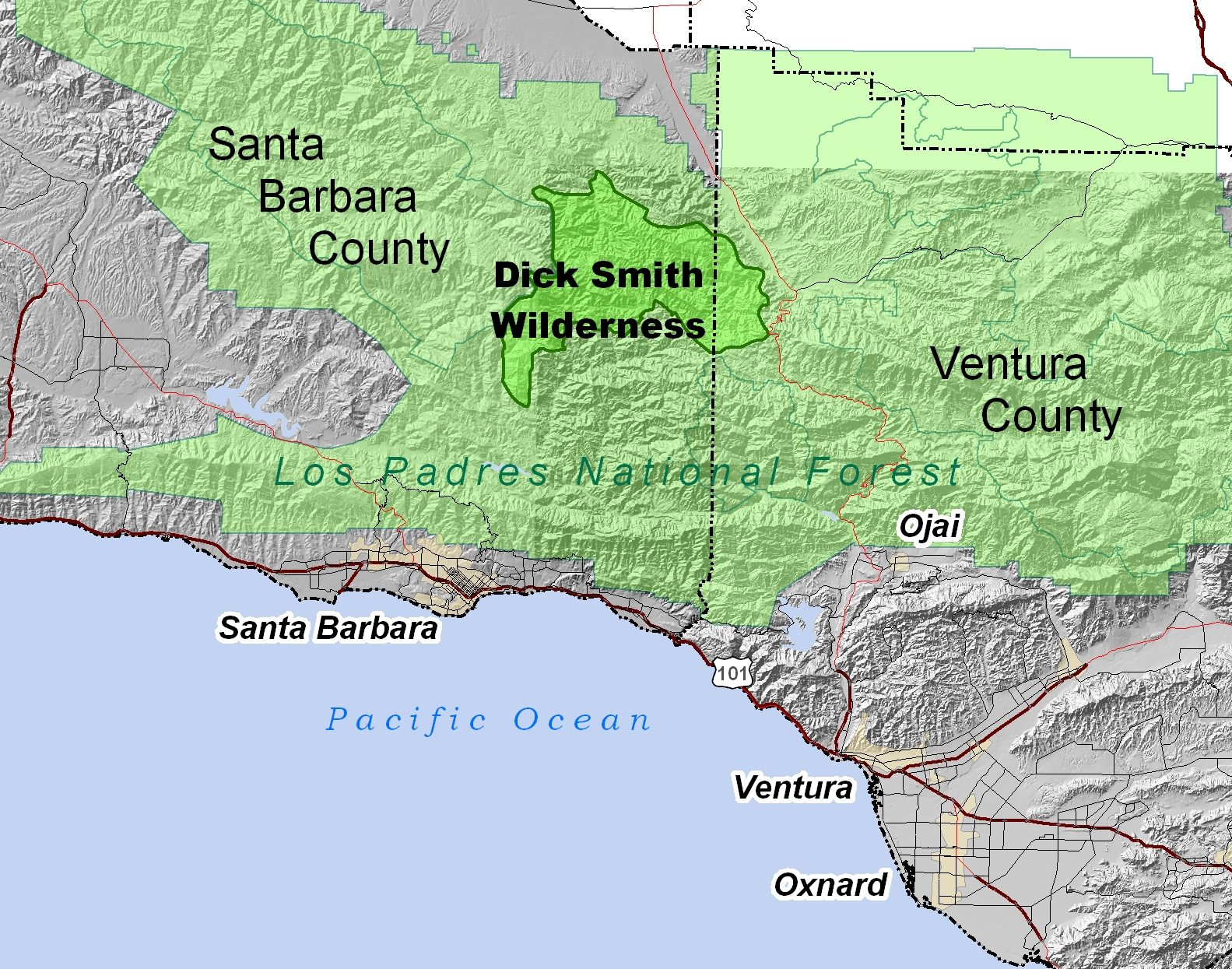
Location of the Dick Smith Wilderness in Santa Barbara and Ventura Counties, California.

The Dick Smith Wilderness is a wilderness area in the mountains of eastern Santa Barbara County, California, United States, with a portion in Ventura County. It is completely contained within the Los Padres National Forest, and is northeast of the city of Santa Barbara and north of the city of Ojai. It is most easily accessible from two trailheads off State Route 33, which runs north from Ojai. It is adjacent to the large San Rafael Wilderness on the west and the Matilija Wilderness on the south. Across Highway 33 to the east, and also in the Los Padres National Forest, is the large Sespe Wilderness.

The wilderness is named after Santa Barbaran Dick Smith, who was a reporter, photographer, historian and pioneer in environmental journalism for the Santa Barbara News-Press. Smith spent more time in these remote regions of Santa Barbara County than anyone, covering the area on horseback and accompanied by his dog. In recognition of Dick's personal pursuit to preserve the wild back country the area was named in his honor, and the U.S. Congress created the wilderness in 1984 as part of the California Wilderness Act.

== Geography ==
The wilderness is in the Transverse Ranges, east of the junction of the San Rafael Mountains and Sierra Madre Mountains at Big Pine Mountain. Madulce Peak, at 6,541 feet, is the highest mountain completely within the wilderness, and the lowest point is 3,700 feet where Santa Barbara Creek exits to the north. The wilderness contains the divide between two watersheds: the Cuyama River to the north, and the Santa Ynez River to the south. The major streams carrying runoff to those two rivers are Santa Barbara Creek and Mono Creek, respectively.

The Big Pine Fault cuts through the wilderness from west to east, trending northeast after exiting the wilderness, in the direction of the nearby San Andreas Fault, which is only about 12 miles from the wilderness boundary. The Pine Mountain Fault splits off from the Big Pine; it is visible along the southern slope of nearby Reyes Peak. Most rocks in the wilderness are Eocene marine sediments, with some scattered outcrops of Pliocene, Miocene, and Oligocene sediments, especially immediately to the south of the Pine Mountain Fault (the contact between these rock units and the Eocene sediments defines the Big Pine Fault).

== Climate ==
The climate of the wilderness is Mediterranean, but modified by distance from the ocean. Since much of the wilderness is separated from the ocean by a mountain divide, and is at fairly high altitude, freezes are common in the winter, as is occasional snow. Summers at lower elevations are hot and dry; rain is extremely rare between April and October, and dry lightning from the occasional thunderstorms can start fires.

== Vegetation and wildlife ==
Vegetation in the wilderness is predominantly chaparral, although there are regions of conifers, including big cone Douglas fir, especially on north-facing slopes, such as the northern exposure of Madulce Peak. Streams contain riparian vegetation, and there are some stands of oak trees. A relict population of great basin sagebrush (Artemisia tridentata) is visible along Highway 33 at the Bear Canyon trailhead; several populations of this species are left over from the last glacial epoch, when it was more widespread due to the cooler climate then.

Wildlife that may be encountered in the wilderness includes coyotes, black bears, and mountain lions. The California condor can occasionally be seen, since the endangered bird was released back into the wild in 1992, and the wilderness is positioned between the two major Southern California condor sanctuaries, the Sisquoc (in the San Rafael Wilderness to the northwest) and the Sespe (in the Sespe wilderness to the southeast).

== History ==
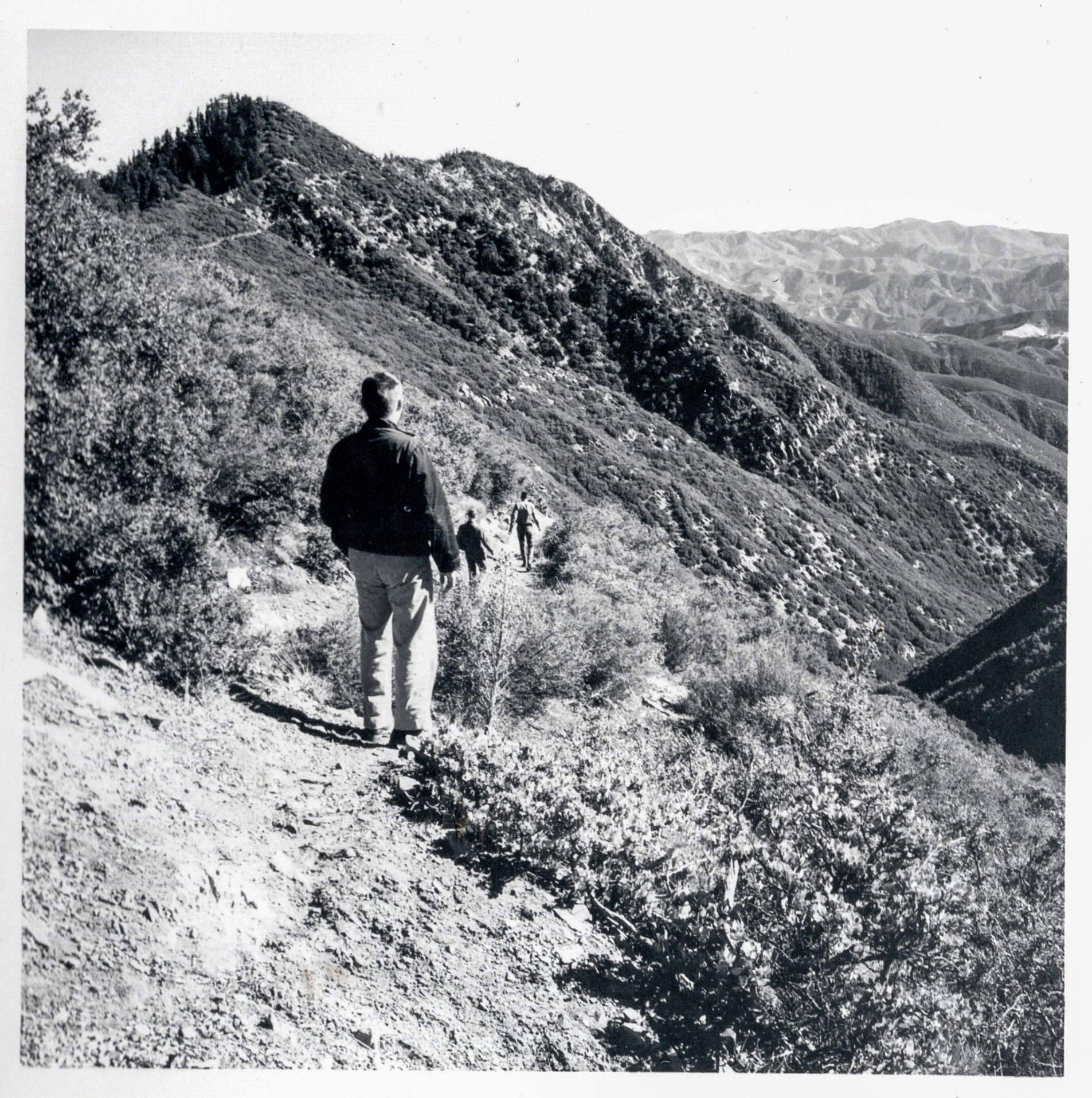
Hikers heading to Madulce Peak in the Dick Smith Wilderness in the spring of 1963.

The region has been continuously inhabited by humans for over 10,000 years. Rock art by the resident Chumash Indians is scattered across the region; locations of rock paintings are generally not made public for fear of vandalism.

Almost all of the wilderness was burned in 2007 by the Zaca Fire.
