= Sisquoc Falls =

Coordinates: 34°44′35″N 119°43′54″W

Sisquoc Falls is a large plunge type waterfall located in the San Rafael Mountains of Santa Barbara County, California, about 65 miles (105 km) east of Santa Maria. It is located in the backcountry of the San Rafael Wilderness on Falls Canyon Creek, a tributary of the Sisquoc River.

One of the tallest waterfalls in Southern California, the falls stand at least 250 feet (76 m) high, dropping off the edge of a semi-circular natural amphitheatre into a long and deep pool. Many smaller cascades occur both above and below the main drop. Fed by a fairly large and high elevation watershed, the falls flow strongly between December and April but diminish to a trickle by late summer.

The falls are extremely difficult to access, requiring a 20-mile (32 km) one way hike from the closest road. In addition, the waterfall itself sits in the Sisquoc Condor Sanctuary, which is off limits to the public, so it can only be legally viewed from a distance.

== See also ==
- List of waterfalls
- List of waterfalls of California
