= Figueroa Sulfide =

- Stratigraphic range: Pliensbachian-Toarcian; ~185–181 Ma
- Type: Geological formation
- Unit of: Franciscan Complex
- Area: San Rafael Mountains
- Thickness: 40 m

Lithology
- Primary: sulfide lens; lithified chert

Location
- Location: California
- Coordinates: 34.7°N 119.8°W
- Approximate paleocoordinates: 23.2°S 57.0°W
- Region: California
- Country: USA

Type section
- Named for: Figueroa Mountain
- Figueroa Sulfide (the United States)

The Figueroa Sulfide (also known as Figueroa Hydrothermal vent or Figueroa Massive Sulfide) is a geological formation in California, USA, dating to roughly between 185 and 181 million years ago and covering the Pliensbachian-Toarcian stages of the Jurassic Period in the Mesozoic Era. This deposits represent deep sea hydrothermal vents, with the oldest confirmed record of Siboglinidae and adjacent biotas, being one of the oldest records of such ecosystem, with similar occurrences found elsewhere in the Americas, for example from Los Molles Formation of Argentina.

== Paleoenvironment ==
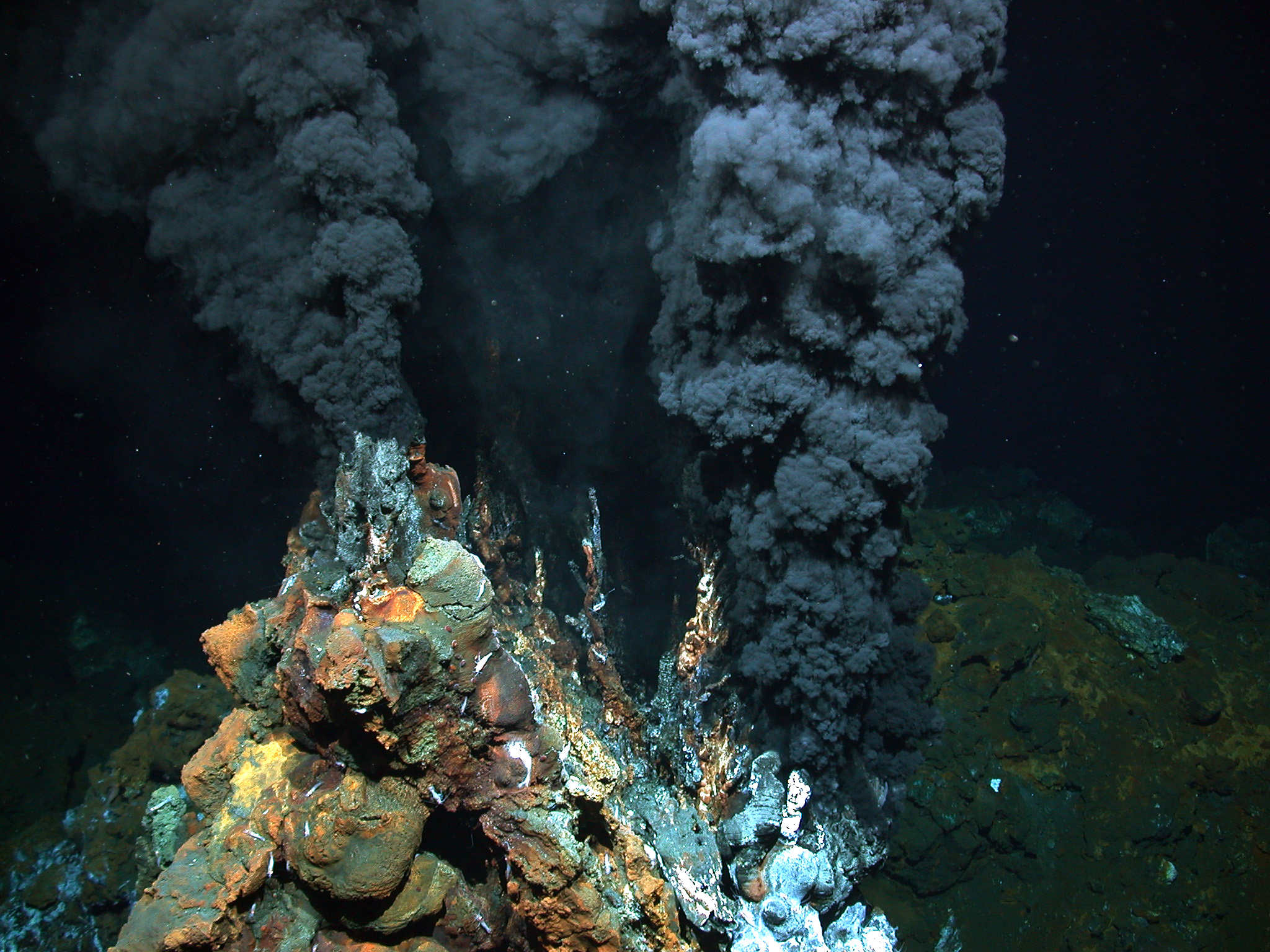
A Hydrothermal Vent ecosystem is recorded in Figueroa Sulfide (Modern example from Mid-Atlantic Ridge)

The Figueroa Sulfide is located in the San Rafael Mountains and is part of the Franciscan Complex, which formed during subduction of the Farallon Plate. This geological formation includes altered basalts, serpentinites, cherts, and tectonically sheared mudstones. The Figueroa Sulfide consists of a 1.5-meter-thick sulfide lens with a silicified core, flanked by more friable sulfides, and is structurally overlain by altered volcanics and cherts. The deposit shows evidence of tectonic brecciation and oxidation before silica deposition. Though small and not viable for large-scale mining, its mineralization and vent structures suggest similarities to modern hydrothermal vent systems.

Biostratigraphic analysis of the Figueroa Sulfide, based on radiolarian fossils extracted from chert samples, indicates a late Pliensbachian to early Toarcian age. The presence of key radiolarian taxa, such as Parahsuum ovale and Bagotum sp., supports this dating. Taphonomically, fossils found in the deposit, including brachiopods, gastropods, and vestimentiferan tubes, are preserved as pyrite molds, replicating fine details of the original shells and tubes. These fossils suggest an ancient hydrothermal vent community, where organisms like tube worms and brachiopods likely relied on chemosynthetic bacteria for nutrition, mirroring modern vent ecosystems.

The Figueroa sulfide fossil assemblage differs from modern vent communities in species diversity, composition, and trophic structure. Unlike modern vents, the Figueroa Sulfide has only three species, lacks common taxa such as Vesicomyidae and Bathymodiolus bivalves, arthropods, and gastropods, and has no predators. Possible explanations for these differences include taphonomic bias, where only high-temperature vent species were fossilized, and a genuinely low-diversity Jurassic vent ecosystem. Some "missing" taxa, such as Vesicomyidae, likely evolved later, supported by their fossil record starting in the early Cretaceous and molecular divergence estimates.

== Biota ==
=== Radiolarians ===
Genus	Species	Stratigraphic position	Material	Notes	Images
Bagotum	B. modestum	North of Santa Barbara	Calcareous Skeletons	A Radiolarian of the family Bagotidae	
Canoptum	C. poissoni	North of Santa Barbara	Calcareous Skeletons	A Radiolarian of the family Parvicingulidae	
Canutus	C. sp.	North of Santa Barbara	Calcareous Skeletons	A Radiolarian of the family Bagotidae	
Crucella	C. ssp.	North of Santa Barbara	Calcareous Skeletons	A Radiolarian of the family Hagiastridae	
Dictyomitrella	D.? sp.	North of Santa Barbara	Calcareous Skeletons	A Radiolarian of the family Parvicingulidae	
Eucyrtidiellum	E. sp.	North of Santa Barbara	Calcareous Skeletons	A Radiolarian of the family Eucyrtidiellidae	
Katroma	K. sp.	North of Santa Barbara	Calcareous Skeletons	A Radiolarian of the family Syringocapsidae	
Napora	N. sp.	North of Santa Barbara	Calcareous Skeletons	A Radiolarian of the family Ultranaporidae	
Pantanellium	P. cf. buntonense; P. ssp.	North of Santa Barbara	Calcareous Skeletons	A Radiolarian of the family Pantanelliidae	
Parahsuum	P. mostleri; P. simplum; P. ovale; P. sp.	North of Santa Barbara	Calcareous Skeletons	A Radiolarian of the family Hsuidae	
Paronaella	P. sp.	North of Santa Barbara	Calcareous Skeletons	A Radiolarian of the family Angulobracchiidae	
Praeconocaryomma	P. cf. immodica; P. cf. magnimamma; P. aff. magnimamma; P cf. whiteavesi; P.? fasciata; P. cf. decora; P. cf. media; P. cf. parvimamma	North of Santa Barbara	Calcareous Skeletons	A Radiolarian of the family Praeconocaryommidae	
Pseudoristola	P. sp.	North of Santa Barbara	Calcareous Skeletons	A Radiolarian of the family Parvicingulidae	
Staurolonche	S.? sp.	North of Santa Barbara	Calcareous Skeletons	A Radiolarian of the family Stylosphaeridae	
Stichocapsa	S. sp.	North of Santa Barbara	Calcareous Skeletons	A Radiolarian of the family Eucyrtidiidae	
Transhsuum	T. sp.	North of Santa Barbara	Calcareous Skeletons	A Radiolarian of the family Hsuidae	
Triactoma	T. sp.	North of Santa Barbara	Calcareous Skeletons	A Radiolarian of the family Xiphostylidae	
Trillus	T. cf. elkhornensis	North of Santa Barbara	Calcareous Skeletons	A Radiolarian of the family Pantanelliidae	
Zartus	Z. sp.	North of Santa Barbara	Calcareous Skeletons	A Radiolarian of the family Pantanelliidae	

=== Brachiopoda ===
Genus	Species	Stratigraphic position	Material	Notes	Images
Anarhynchia	A. cf. gabbi	North of Santa Barbara	Shells	A Brachiopod of the family Peregrinellidae	

=== Gastropoda ===
Genus	Species	Stratigraphic position	Material	Notes	Images
Francisciconcha	F. maslennikovi	North of Santa Barbara	Shells	A Top Snail of the family Trochidae	

=== Polychaeta ===
Genus	Species	Stratigraphic position	Material	Notes	Images
Siboglinidae	"Figueroa tubes"	North of Santa Barbara	Cylindrical tubes	A Vestimentiferan, considered to be similar to the modern genus Ridgeia, latter resolved among modern vestimentiferans.	Example of modern Ridgeia specimens
