= Little Pine Mountain =

Mountain in California, United States

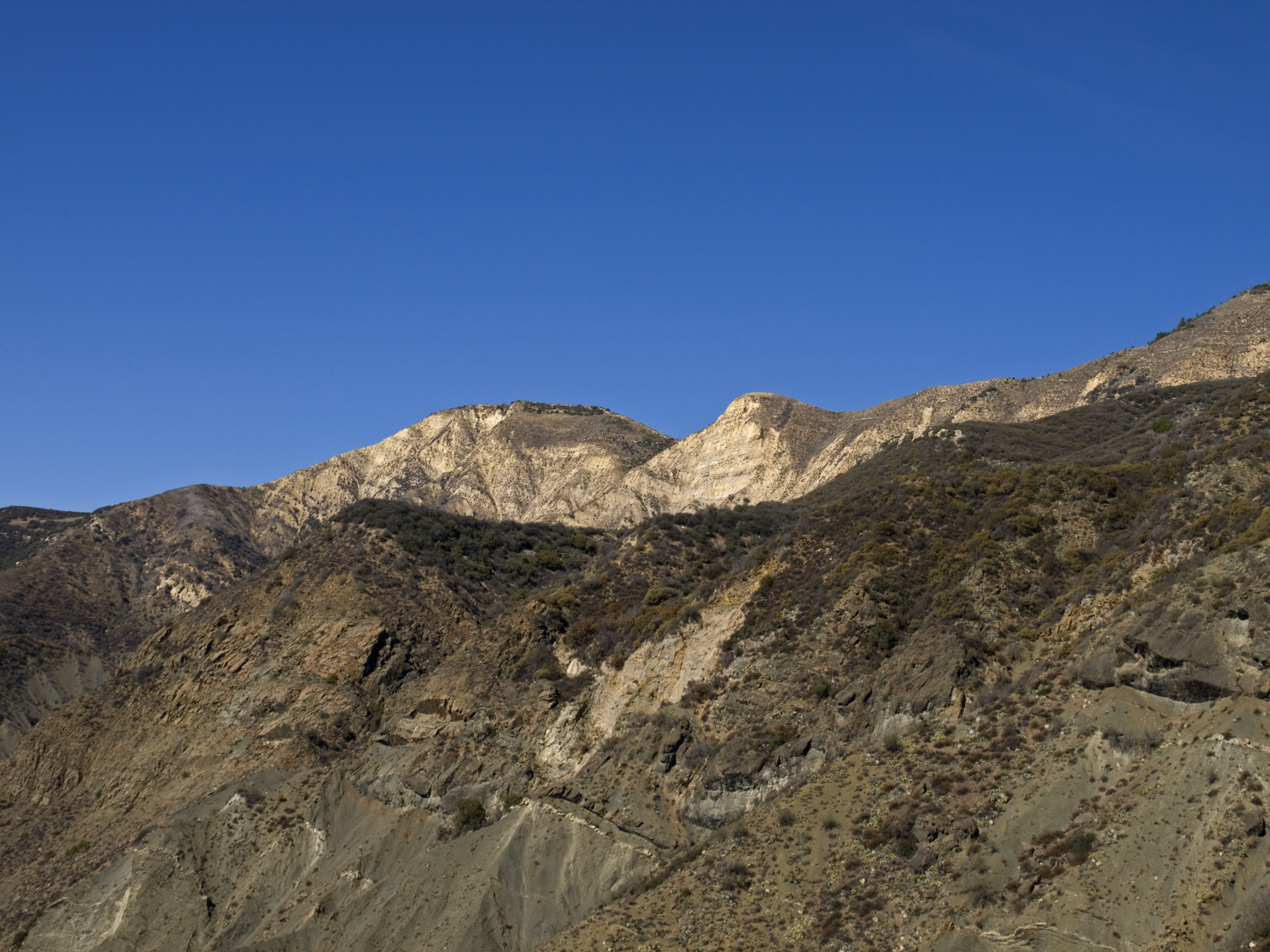
- Little Pine Mountain is on the right edge of the photo

Highest point
- Elevation: 4,462 ft (1,360 m) NAVD 88
- Prominence: 518 ft (158 m)
- Listing: Lower Peaks Committee
- Coordinates: 34°36′02″N 119°44′20″W

Geography
- Location within California Location within the United States
- Location: Santa Barbara County, California, U.S.
- Parent range: San Rafael Mountains
- Topo map: USGS San Marcos Pass

Climbing
- Easiest route: Dirt road (Buckhorn-Camuesa OHV to Little Pine Road)

Little Pine Mountain is a mountain in Santa Barbara County, California, in the Los Padres National Forest at the southern edge of the San Rafael Mountains. It separates the drainages of Oso Creek, which flows into the upper Santa Ynez River, from the drainage of Santa Cruz Creek, which flows into the middle section of the river via Lake Cachuma. The mountain is named for a thin grove of Coulter pines located on the summit.

The mountain is reached by the Santa Cruz National Recreation Trail, and is a popular day hike and mountain biking route for residents of Santa Barbara during the winter months. There is a camp at Happy Hollow Spring near the summit.

The rocks of the lower slopes of the mountain comes from the Franciscan Assemblage, which creates serpentine soils that support a unique chaparral ecosystem. Large deposits of dark-red cinnabar are exposed above ground. The middle slopes of the mountain are dominated by the Espada Formation. The summit largely consists of Matilija Sandstone. There is a small band of Temblor Formation, a Great Valley Sequence unit usually found much farther north, encircling the high ridge of the mountain. North slope outcrops consist largely of Espada Formation rocks, with a band of serpentinite splitting the Espada section in half.
