= Madulce Peak =

Mountain in California, United States

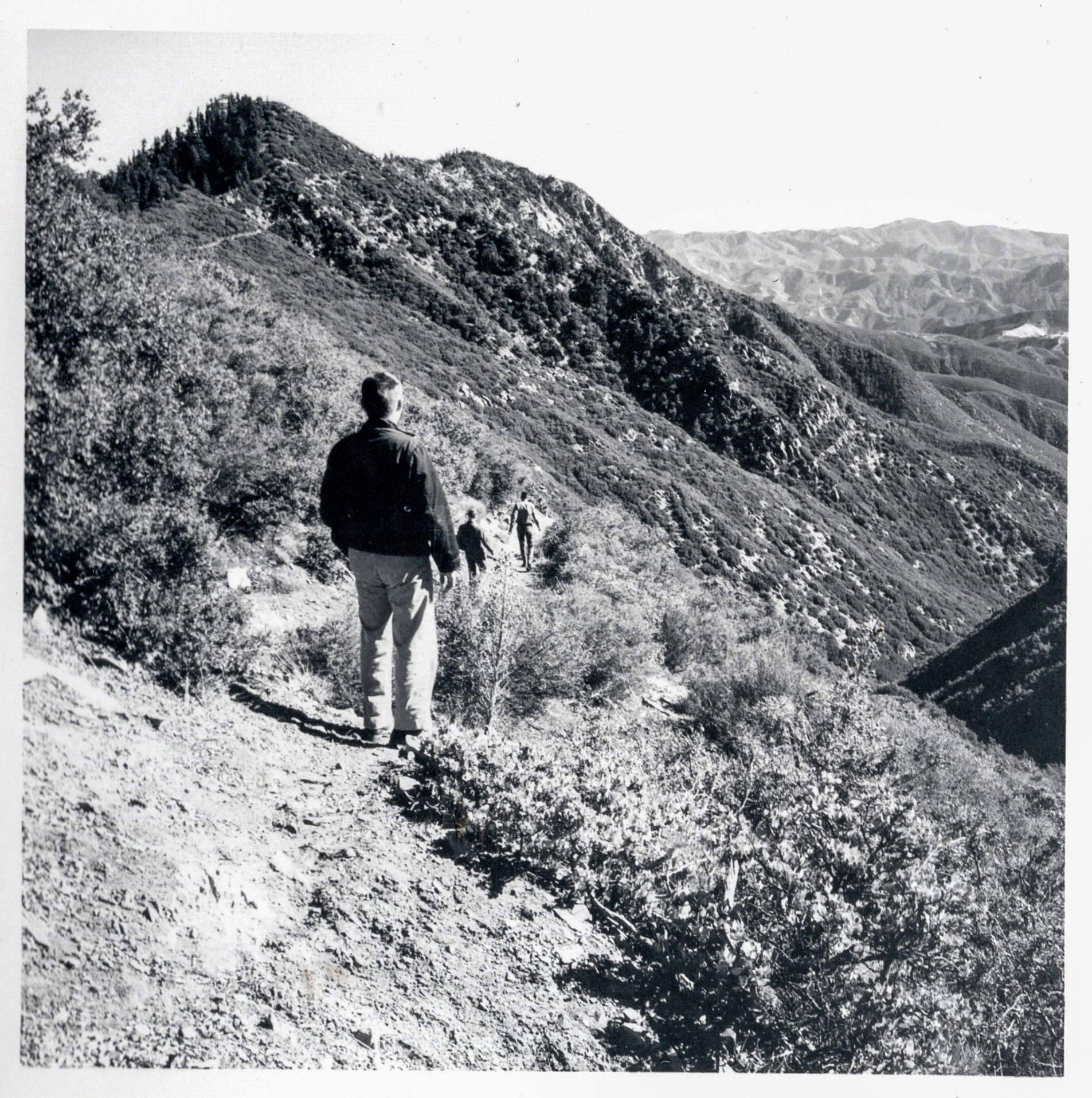
- Hikers en route to Madulce Peak in 1963. Madulce Peak is the highest point on the left.

Highest point
- Elevation: 6,539 ft (1,993 m) NAVD 88
- Prominence: 896 ft (273 m)
- Listing: Hundred Peaks Section
- Coordinates: 34°41′27″N 119°35′28″W

Geography
- Location: Santa Barbara County, California, U.S.
- Parent range: San Rafael Mountains
- Topo map: USGS Madulce Peak

Climbing
- Easiest route: Hike, Madulce Peak Trail

Madulce Peak is a mountain located in the San Rafael Mountains, in the Transverse Ranges. It is the highest point of the Dick Smith Wilderness. The summit contains an old fire lookout that was constructed in the 1930s, but was burned down in the 1970s.

== Name ==
The mountain was originally named Strawberry Peak by surveyors. Over the years, the name "Madulce" was gradually adopted. The Board on Geographic Names originally believed that "madulce" was the Spanish word for "strawberry". Etymological work done by the United States Forest Service ascertained that the word is actually local farmhand slang for "strawberry", from the Catalan word "maduixa".
