= Figueroa Mountain Brewing Company =

American brewing company

Coordinates: 34°36′38.3″N 120°12′08.4″W

- Industry: Alcoholic beverage
- Founded: November 2010; 15 years ago
- Founder: Jaime Dietenhofer, Jim Dietenhofer
- Headquarters: Buellton, California, United States
- Number of locations: 5
- Area served: Southern California
- Products: Beer
- Website: www.figmtnbrew.com

Figueroa Mountain Brewing Company is an American brewing company based in Buellton, California. Founded in 2010 by Jaime and Jim Dietenhofer, the company grew rapidly during the subsequent decade, opening multiple tasting rooms across Southern California. By 2019, the company was producing 23,145 barrels of beer annually and winning medals in industry competitions. In 2020 however, the company declared bankruptcy and, as of October 2022, is undergoing reorganization in bankruptcy.

== History ==
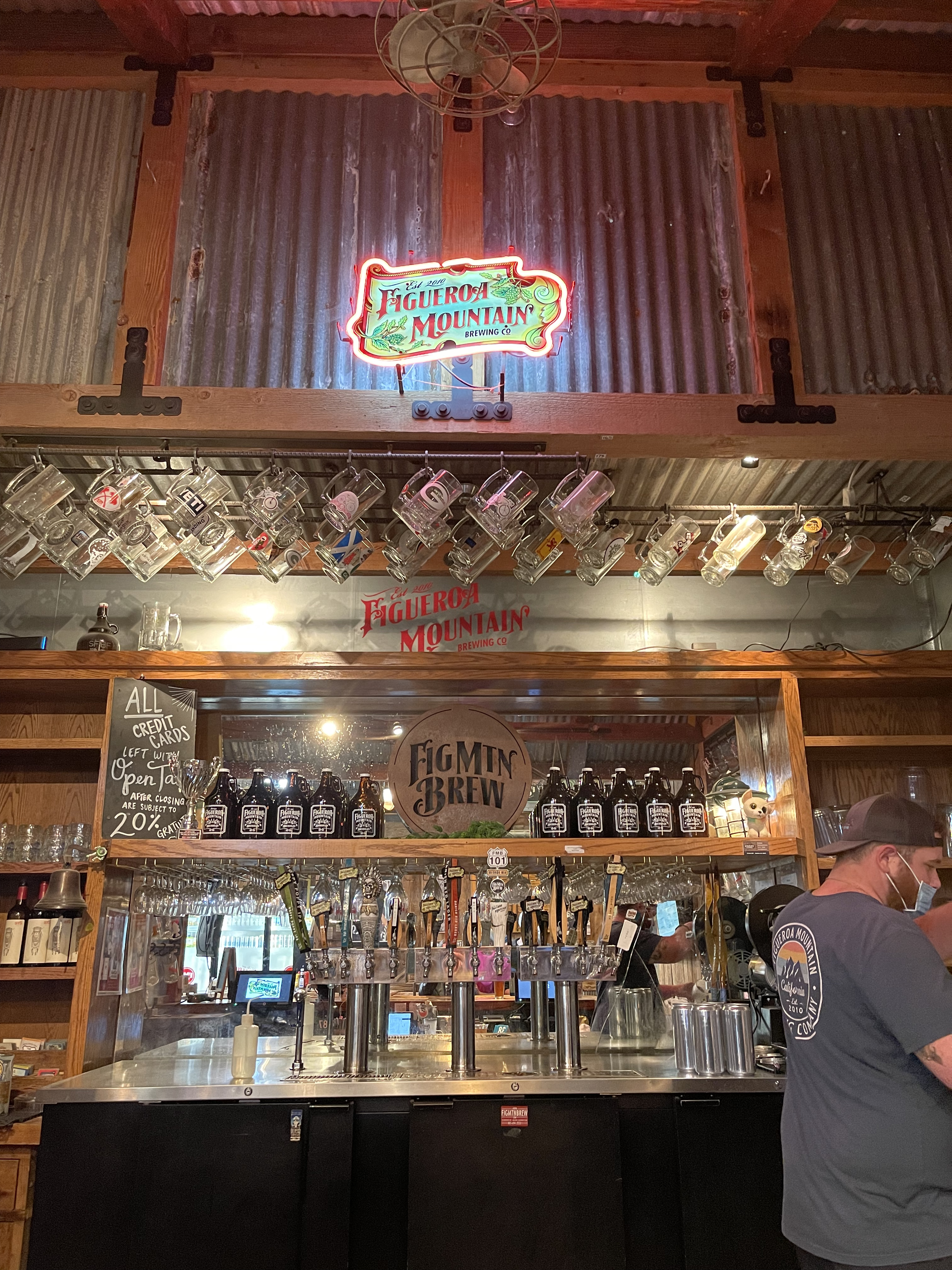
Taproom at Figueroa Mountain Brewing Co. in Buellton.

The company opened for business over Thanksgiving weekend in 2010. Father and son duo, Jaime and Jim Dietenhofer opened the brewery in a converted warehouse in Buellton, California, that housed the company's brewing operations and a small taproom. Jason Courtney served as the company's first brewmaster. The company, drawing inspiration from the surrounding landscape, named itself after the local Figueroa Mountain and named its beers for characteristics of the surrounding region.

In 2013, the company opened its first expansion with a second taproom in Santa Barbara, California. Further expansions followed with taprooms in Los Olivos, California, and Santa Maria, California, in 2014 and Arroyo Grande, California, and Westlake Village, California, in 2015.

By 2017, the company claimed to be brewing beer "around the clock — 22 and a half hours every day — to keep up with demand."

In 2019, the company announced a collaboration with Dean Norris related to his portrayal of the fictional character Hank Schrader in the popular television series Breaking Bad.

By the end of 2019, the company was reportedly producing 23,145 barrels of beer annually and expected to produce up to 27,000 barrels by 2022. On October 5, 2020, however, the company announced that it had filed for Chapter 11 bankruptcy, citing the challenges of the COVID-19 pandemic and that it intended to reorganize and continue operating the business post-bankruptcy. As of June 2022, the company remains in bankruptcy.

In June 2022, the company announced that it was acquiring new taprooms in West Los Angeles, Westwood, Echo Park, and Sherman Oaks.

== Products ==
The company has launched dozens of beers spanning a wide range of styles. As of April 2021, the company's most popular beers include:

- Danish Red Lager
- Davy Brown Ale
- Hoppy Poppy IPA
- Hurricane Deck DIPA
- Lizard's Mouth IIPA
- Paradise Road Pilsner
- Stagecoach Stout

The company had received a number of awards for its beers, including a gold medal at the 2014 Great American Beer Festival, the world's largest commercial beer competition for U.S. beers.
