= Figueroa Mountain =

Mountain in California, United States

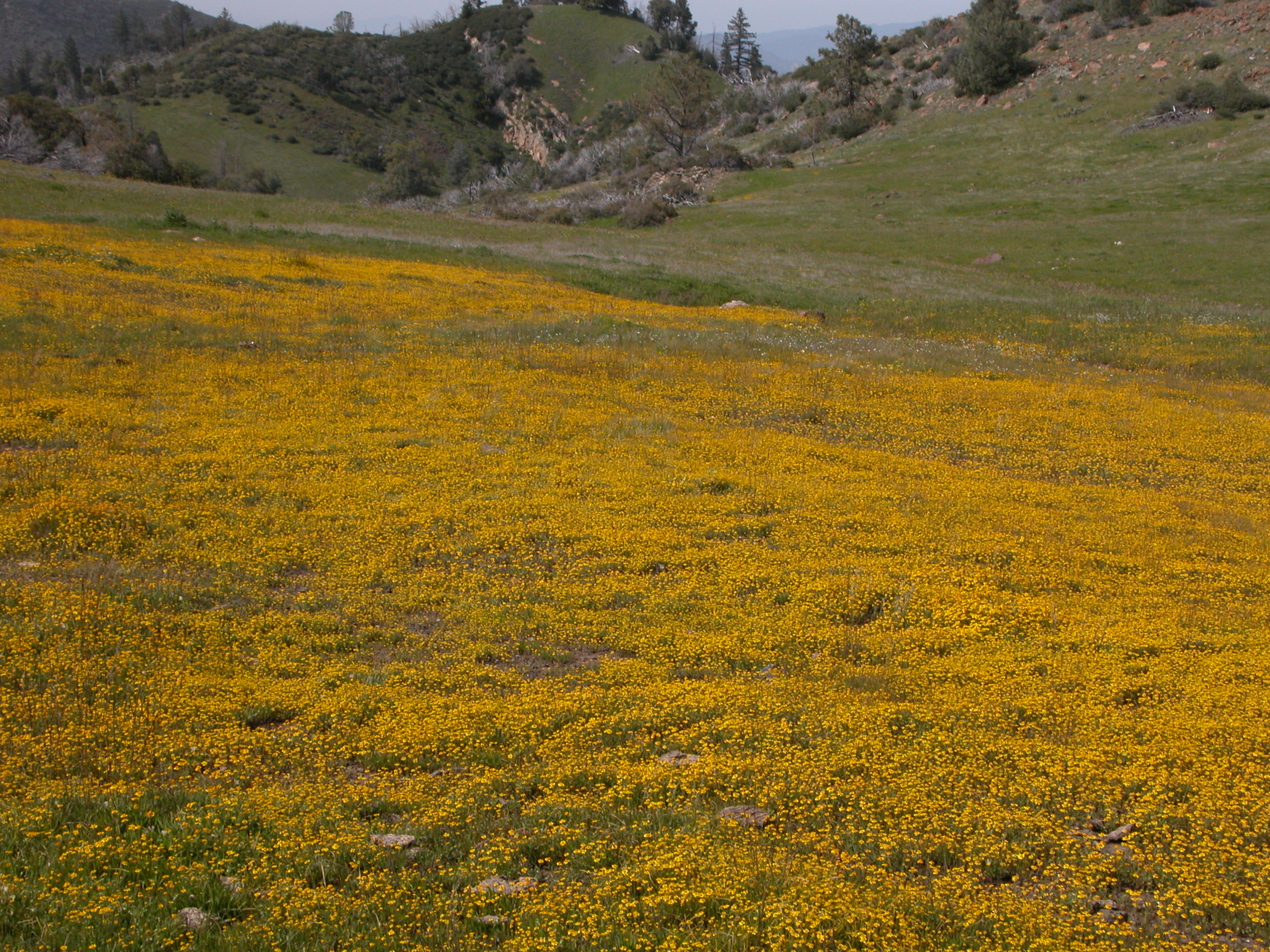

Highest point
- Elevation: 4,534 ft (1,382 m) NAVD 88
- Coordinates: 34°44′36″N 119°59′06″W

Geography
- Location within California Location within the United States
- Location: Santa Barbara County, California, U.S.
- Parent range: San Rafael Mountains
- Topo map: USGS Figueroa Mountain

Figueroa Mountain is a summit in Santa Barbara County in the U.S. state of California. It is in the San Rafael Mountains, part of the Transverse Ranges group of ranges. The mountain is located in Los Padres National Forest.

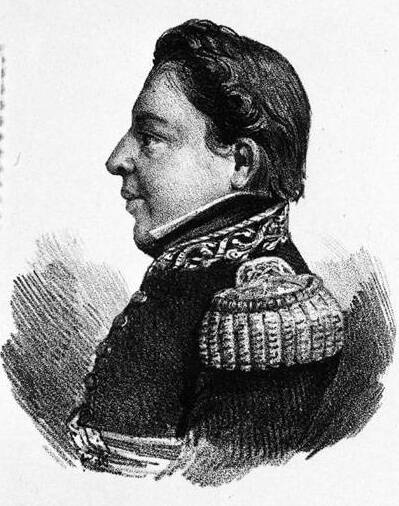
Governor José Figueroa, namesake of the mountain.

Figueroa Mountain was named for a member of the well-known southern California family, the most eminent of whom was José Figueroa, governor of Alta California in 1833–35. In turn, the mountain itself served as the inspiration for the name for the Figueroa Mountain Brewing Company.

The Figueroa Mountain Recreation Area has excellent spring wildflower displays after wet winters. Late March brings out the early blooming specimens such as purple shooting stars (Dodecatheon clevelandii ssp. clevelandii). Later arrivals on the mountain include chocolate lilies (Fritillaria biflora), and the scarlet Indian paintbrush (Castilleja spp). The open grassland areas support a profusion of annual species including goldfields (Lasthenia spp.), sky lupine (Lupinus nanus), and California poppy (Eschscholzia californica). Other favorites include hummingbird sage (Salvia spathacea) and blue dicks (Dipterostemon capitatus). The plant community here is an inland central oak woodland dominated by valley oak (Quercus lobata), blue oak (Quercus douglasii), interior live oak (Quercus wislizenii), and gray pine (Pinus sabiniana). The companion shrub species are manzanita (Arctostaphylos spp.), coffeeberry and redberry (Rhamnus spp.) and gooseberry and currants (Ribes spp.).

This Mountains records the oldest confirmed "modern" biological community related with a Deep sea vent, the Figueroa Sulfide, from the Early Jurassic.
