= Rattlesnake Canyon (Santa Barbara) =

Rattlesnake Canyon in Santa Barbara County, California, United States, stretches from Skofield Park into the Santa Ynez Mountains. The Spanish called the canyon Las Canoas (The Canoes).

== History ==
Around 1808, the Santa Barbara Mission received water from Mission Creek through an aqueduct that was made by the Chumash people. Water was funneled from Rattlesnake Canyon into Mission Creek. The native Chumash people helped dig the channel and build the flumes. In 1808, to build a more permanent structure, dams were built by Mexican artisans on Mission Creek and in Rattlesnake Canyon. Only remnants of the dam still exist, and the reservoir has been filled with sediment from the creek.

In the 1920s the entire canyon was owned by Ray Skofield, a wealthy New Yorker who had moved to Santa Barbara. His son Hobart Skofield planted pine trees in the canyon in the early 1930s. In the Coyote Fire the trees burned, and were replaced in 1966 by the Sierra Club. In 1970, Hobart Skofield sold the upper 450 acres (1.8 km^{2}) of the canyon for $150,000 (less than half of its value) to be made into a wilderness park, the Rattlesnake Canyon Wilderness Area.
