= San Rafael Wilderness =

Protected wilderness area in California, United States

- IUCN category Ib (wilderness area)
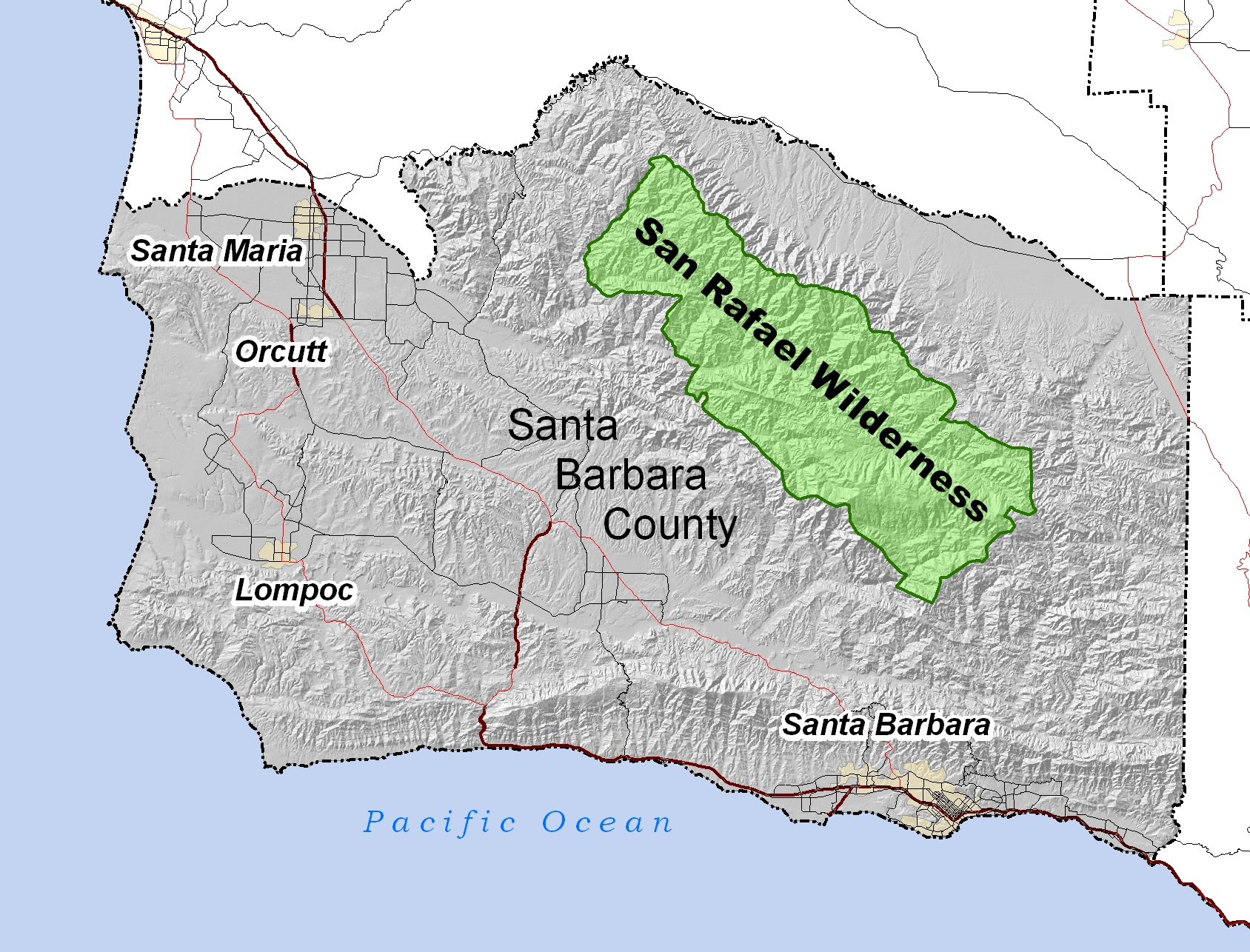
- Location of the San Rafael Wilderness in Santa Barbara County, California

- Location within southern California Location within California Location within the United States
- Interactive map of San Rafael Wilderness
- Location: Santa Barbara County, California, United States
- Nearest city: Santa Barbara, California
- Coordinates: 34°48′41″N 119°51′46″W
- Area: 197,380 acres (79,880 ha)
- Established: 1968
- Governing body: U.S. Forest Service

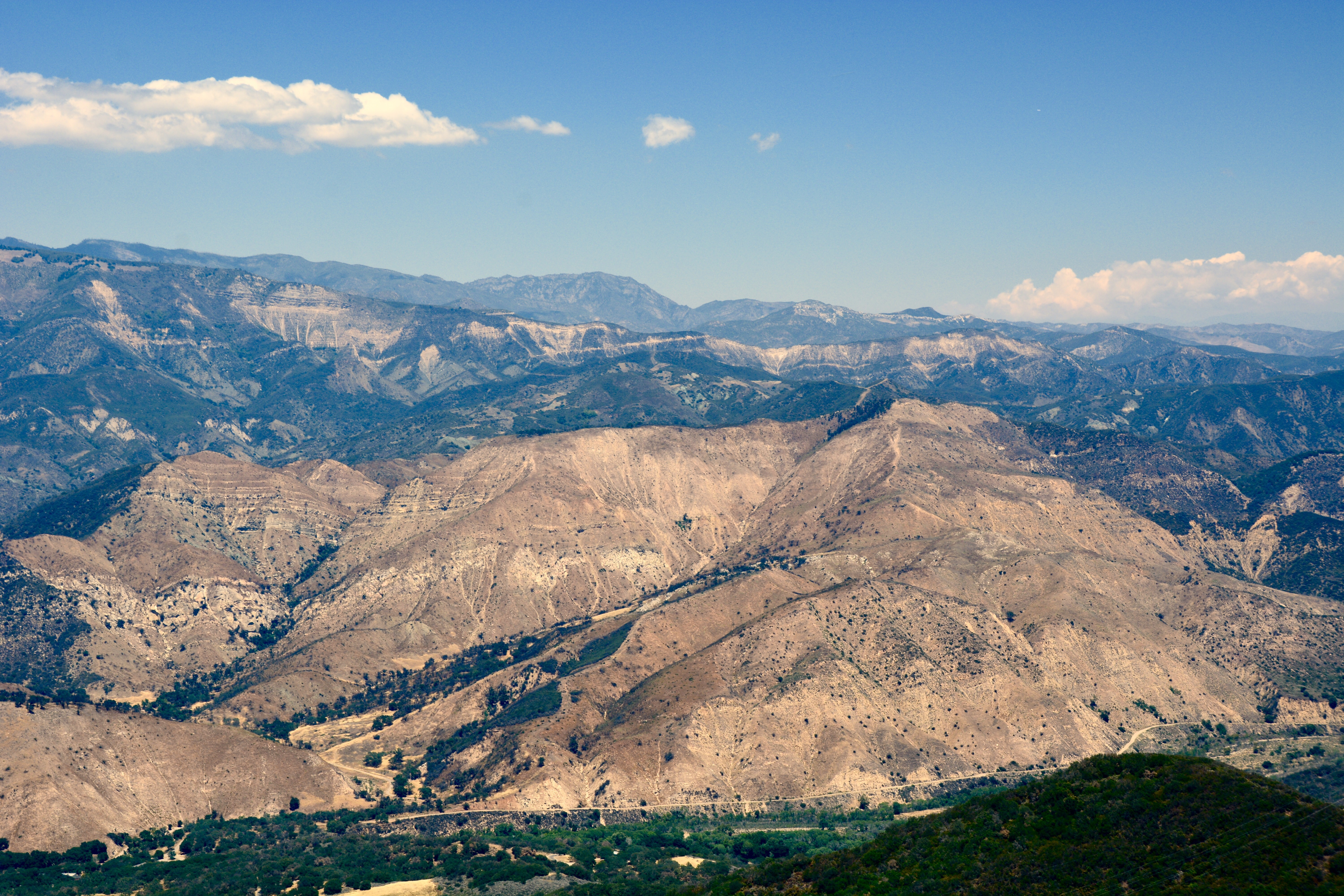
San Rafael Wilderness

The San Rafael Wilderness is a wilderness area in the mountains of north central Santa Barbara County, California, United States. It is north of the city of Santa Barbara and east of Santa Maria within the Los Padres National Forest. Formed in 1968, it was the first wilderness area to be created from a previously designated Primitive Area after the passage of the 1964 Wilderness Act. It also includes the Sisquoc Condor Sanctuary, created in 1937, which is the oldest designated sanctuary for the large endangered birds.

== Geography ==
Most of the wilderness lies between the crests of two parallel mountain ranges, the San Rafael Mountains and Sierra Madre Mountains, and includes the drainages of two watercourses: the Sisquoc River and Manzana Creek. Both flow to the northwest, eventually joining together and draining into the ocean near Santa Maria. Elevations within the wilderness vary from 1,166 feet (355 m) at the confluence of Manzana Creek and the Sisquoc River on the western boundary, to over 6,800 feet (2,100 m) at Big Pine Mountain, the highest point in Santa Barbara County. Dividing the drainages of the Manzana and Sisquoc is a ridge known as Hurricane Deck, a rugged 15-mile (24 km) slab of upthrust sandstone with a trail snaking along the top.

Rock formations in the wilderness are predominantly sedimentary, and are of Miocene and Cretaceous age. Both the Nacimiento and Big Pine Faults run through the wilderness, roughly parallelling the Sierra Madre and San Rafael Mountain crests respectively. Hurricane Deck is a single block of Miocene-age sedimentary rock. Immediately south of the wilderness, opposite the Big Pine and Camuesa Faults, is a large region of the Franciscan Formation. Mercury was formerly mined in this area, and abandoned mines along with tailings piles can be found.

== Climate ==
The climate of the wilderness is Mediterranean, although the distance from the coast allows for cooler winters and hotter summers than are found in the coastal strip. Snow is common on the higher peaks in the winter, although it rarely lingers except on north-facing slopes. Rain is extremely rare in the summer, and dry lightning from the occasional thunderstorms can start fires.

== Vegetation and wildlife ==
The typical vegetation in the wilderness is chaparral and oak woodland, although there are stands of pine and fir at higher elevations and on north-facing slopes, as well as riparian forests in the streams. The river valleys open out in a few places to allow for meadows and grasslands; these are the locations that were settled in the 19th century. Wildlife that may be encountered in the wilderness includes coyotes, black bears, and mountain lions. The California condor can occasionally be seen, since the endangered bird was released back into the wild in 1992. The 1,200-acre (4.9 km^{2}) Sisquoc Condor Sanctuary, in the southeastern part of the wilderness, was chosen for its inaccessible terrain, which includes rock ledges favored by condors for nesting sites. Public entry is prohibited in the Sanctuary.

== History ==
The region has been continuously inhabited by humans for over 10,000 years. Rock art by the resident Chumash Indians is scattered across the region; locations of rock paintings are generally not made public for fear of vandalism.

In the 1880s, a group of about 200 faith healers, led by Hiram Preserved Wheat (1822–1903), settled along the Sisquoc River in about 20 separate homesteads. The ruins of their habitations, including the "Manzana Schoolhouse", can be seen to the present day. At the time, they were mistakenly called "Mormons", and the error has been preserved in the name of one campsite along the Sisquoc River in the central part of the wilderness. They built the schoolhouse in 1893, but by 1902 it was closed, and most of the group had left. After the faith healers had left, another settler, Charles Dabney, built a cabin for himself and his family in 1914; it can be seen on a terrace above Manzana Creek.

The wilderness is often closed to entry during fire season, the exact dates of which vary but usually include the late summer and early fall. Most of the wilderness was burned in the 1966 Wellman Fire, and during July, August, and September 2007, the western, southern, and eastern parts of the wilderness were burned for the first time in 41 years (for the western portion) and for more than 100 years (for the remainder), in the Zaca Fire.

At its creation in 1968 the San Rafael Wilderness consisted of only 149,170 acres (604 km^{2}). Originally it was the San Rafael Primitive Area. Due to a disagreement between the Forest Service, US Congress and conservationists over 2,200 acres (8.9 km^{2}) of natural grass openings called potreros, which contained pictographs from the Chumash Indians, it took a long time for the wilderness designation. In 1992, after the passage of the Los Padres Condor Range and River Protection Act, Congress added an additional 48,210 acres (195 km^{2}) adjacent to the original area on the northwest. The wilderness is also adjacent to the Dick Smith Wilderness to the east; this protected area was created in 1984.
