= Skofield Park =

Park in Santa Barbara, California

Coordinates: 34°27′20″N 119°41′44″W

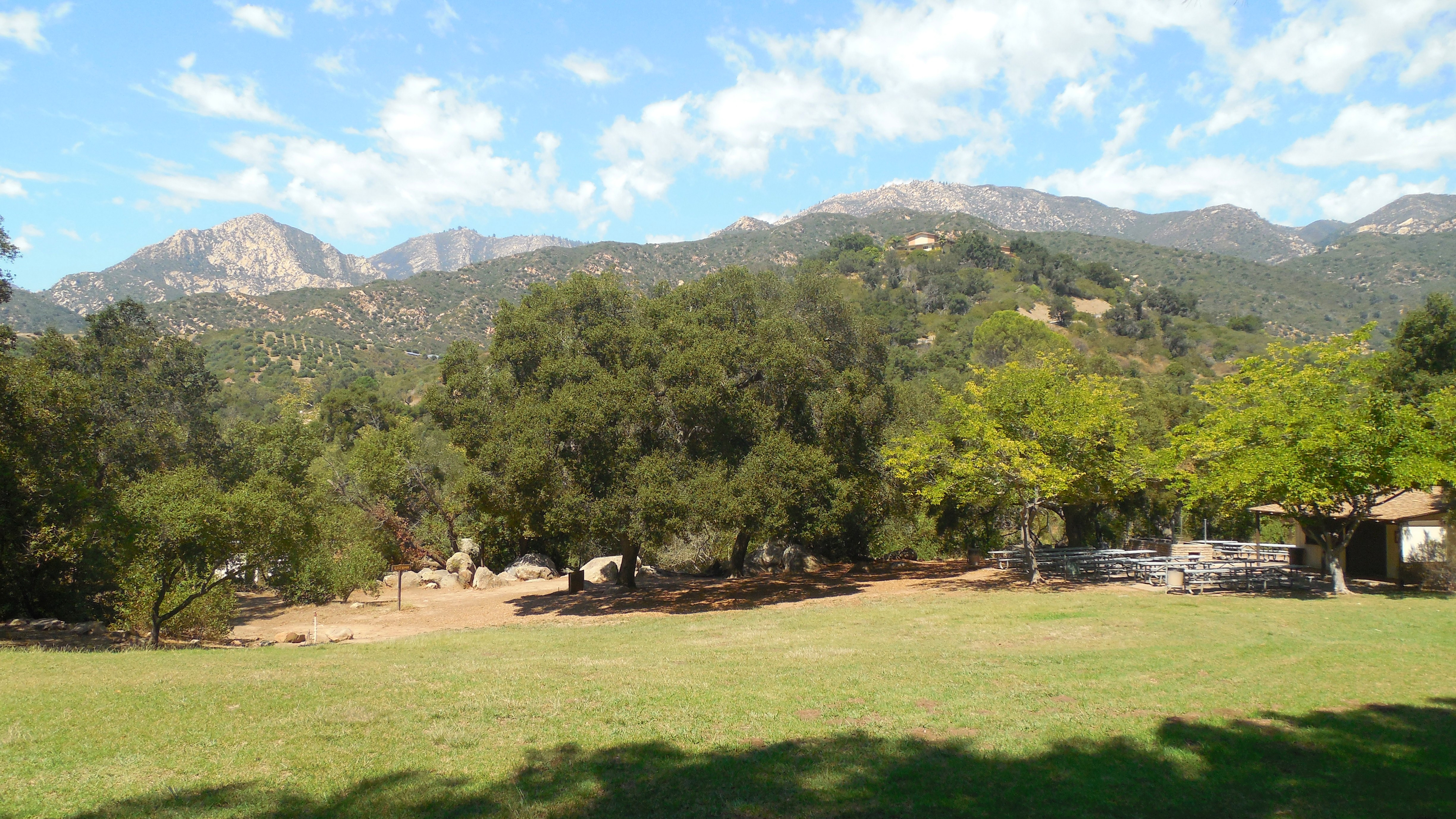
- Skofield Park view northward toward the Santa Ynez Mountains
- Interactive map of Skofield Park
- Location: Las Canoas Road in Santa Barbara, California
- Area: 35 acres (14 ha)
- Created: September 1, 1964
- Operator: City of Santa Barbara Parks & Recreation Department
- Website: Skofield Park

Skofield Park is a 35 acres (140,000 m^{2}) natural open space preserve and city park located within Santa Barbara, California. Rattlesnake Canyon Park is located nearby, with both in the "front country" of the Santa Ynez Mountains.

== History ==
The land was formerly owned by Ray Skofield, and originally used as a camp for "Los Rancheros Vistadores," a men's riding group which Skofield was a founder of in 1930. When the surrounding area began getting more developed, Los Rancheros sold the land to the City for a park for $145,000 in May 1954.

== Features ==
Features of the park include a nature path, picnic areas, bird watching, and native oak groves. It also has the city's only reservable campgrounds. The parking area for Skofield Park is also used for nearby Rattlesnake Canyon Park and the Rattlesnake Canyon Trail.
