= Sierra Madre (California) =

Mountain range of the Transverse Ranges in California, United States

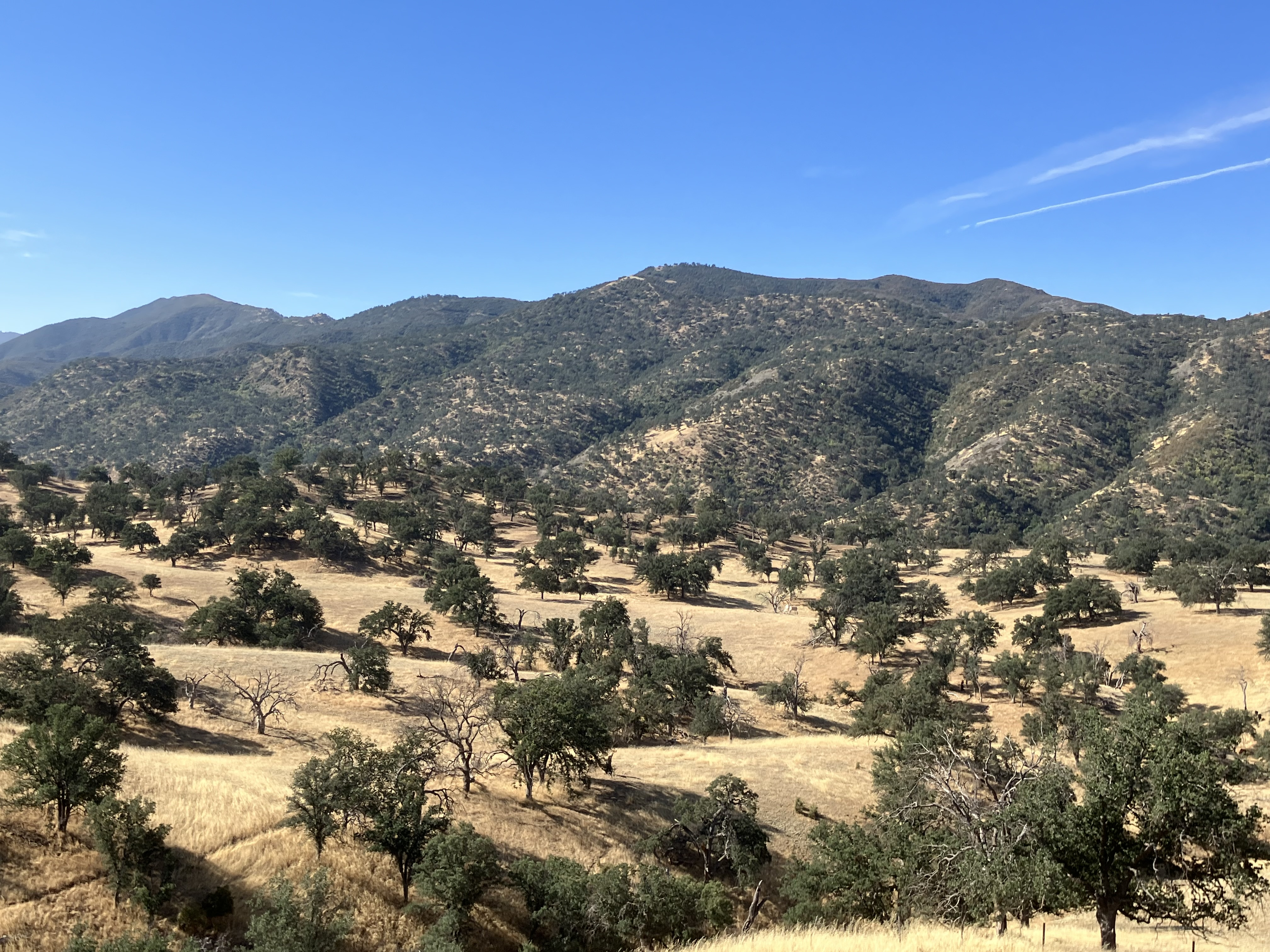
- Sierra Madre as seen from across the Cuyama Valley

Highest point
- Peak: Peak Mountain
- Elevation: 1,781 m (5,843 ft)
- Coordinates: 34°54′7.53″N 119°51′31.45″W

Geography
- Location within California
- Country: United States
- State: California
- District: Santa Barbara County
- Range coordinates: 34°54′7.927″N 119°51′31.495″W
- Topo map: USGS Peak Mountain

Geology
- Rock type: California Coast Ranges

The Sierra Madre (Spanish for "mother range") is a mountain range in southwestern California. It forms the southernmost part of the California Coast Ranges and lies mostly in Santa Barbara County, with a small portion extending into Ventura County. The Sierra Madre has a northwest-to-southeast orientation, bordered on the north and northeast by the Cuyama River and Cuyama Valley, and on the south and east by the drainage of the Sisquoc River.

Before the middle of the twentieth century, the term "Sierra Madre" referred to the portion of the Transverse Ranges north of the Los Angeles Basin, now known as the San Gabriel Mountains. In 1965, the United States Board of Geographic Names assigned the name Sierra Madre to the range in Santa Barbara County.

== Geography ==
The Sierra Madre range trends from northwest to southeast, and is approximately 25 mi (40 km) long. High peaks in the range include McPherson Peak at 5,747 feet (1,752 m) in elevation, and the highest point in the range, Peak Mountain at 5,843 feet (1,781 m) in elevation. Snow falls on the higher elevations during the winter months.

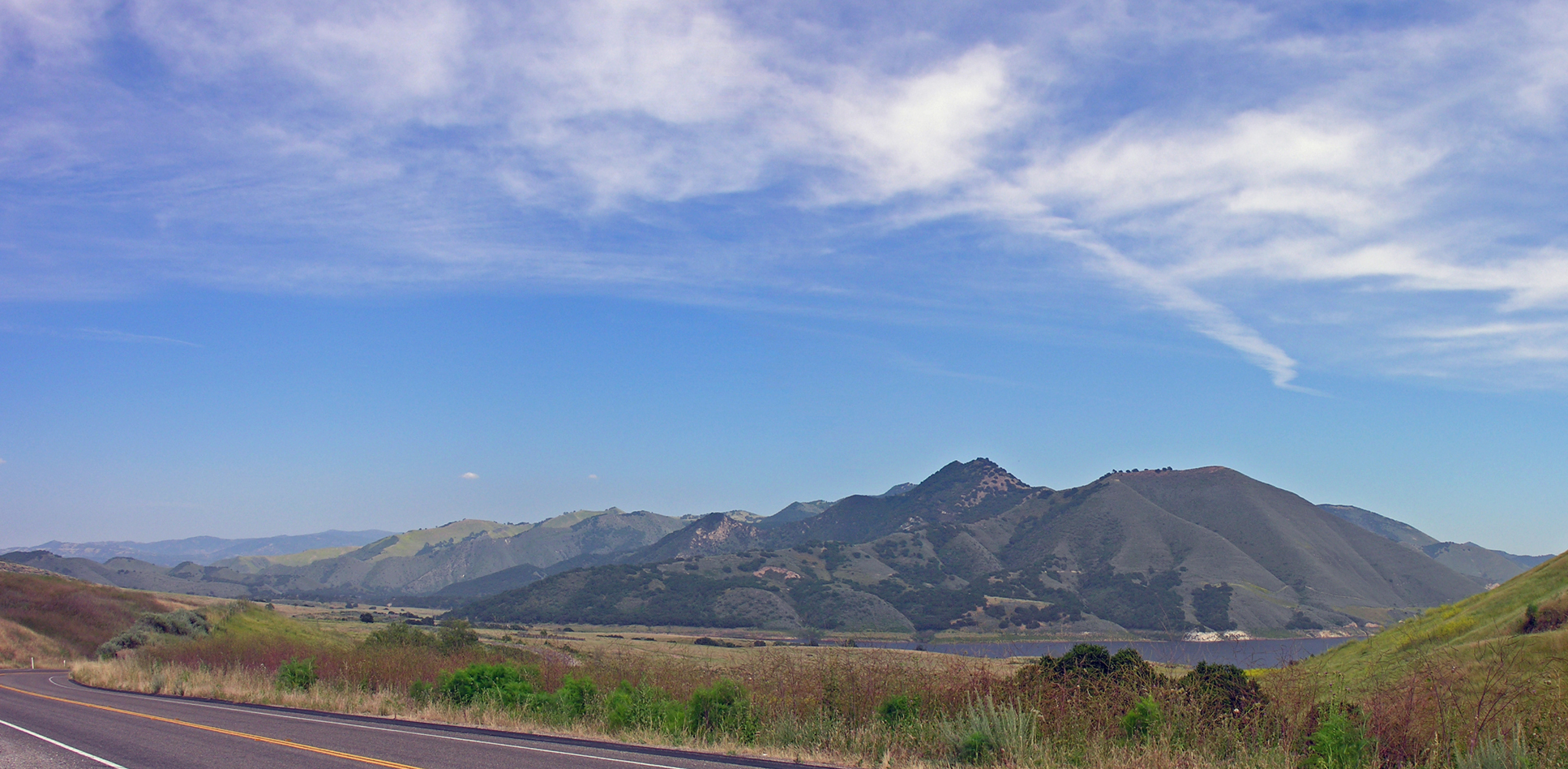
Las Coches Mountain in the Sierra Madre, from SR 166.

The range forms the southwestern side of the Cuyama Valley. The La Panza Range is a northern extension of the Sierra Madre, located in eastern San Luis Obispo County.

The Sierra Madre is almost entirely within the Los Padres National Forest, and marks the northern boundary of the San Rafael Wilderness area. The southeastern extent of the range is about 25 mi (40 km) north of the city of Santa Barbara, and the northwestern extent of the range is about 50 mi (80 km) north by northwest of the city.

To the southeast, the range merges with the San Rafael Mountains of the Transverse Ranges System, in a complex topography of unnamed ranges. The adjacent highest point of the San Rafael Mountains, and in all Santa Barbara County, is Big Pine Mountain (6,820 ft (2,079 m)).

== Natural history ==
The Sierra Madre lies in the region historically inhabited by the Chumash people, who used sites in the mountains for sacred ceremonies and rites. Numerous petroglyphs can still be found in the area, including the Painted Rock Site, identified as S'ap'aski or House of the Sun in Chumash tradition.

The predominant vegetation type on the mountains is chaparral shrubland, with oak woodlands that occur in microclimates, both of the California interior chaparral and woodlands sub-ecoregion. The higher elevations support California mixed evergreen forest and small areas of coniferous forest habitats.

The mountains are one of the most important undeveloped habitat areas of the endangered California condor.

Geologically, the mountains are mostly sedimentary rock of Tertiary age, with some marine and non-marine sedimentary rocks of Eocene and Upper Cretaceous age. There is a large proportion of sandstone, and one region in the eastern portion of the range is made up of Neogene sediments.

The mountain range is almost entirely uninhabited, except for portions of the lower slopes to the north, which have been developed for oil and gas production at the South Cuyama Oil Field. One difficult, single-lane dirt road follows the mountain crest; it often is closed after storms, and is normally only passable by four-wheel-drive vehicles or motorcycles.

== See also ==
- California chaparral and woodlands — ecoregion.
- Flora of the California chaparral and woodlands
