= Zaca Fire =

2007 wildfire in Southern California

- Part of the 2007 California wildfires
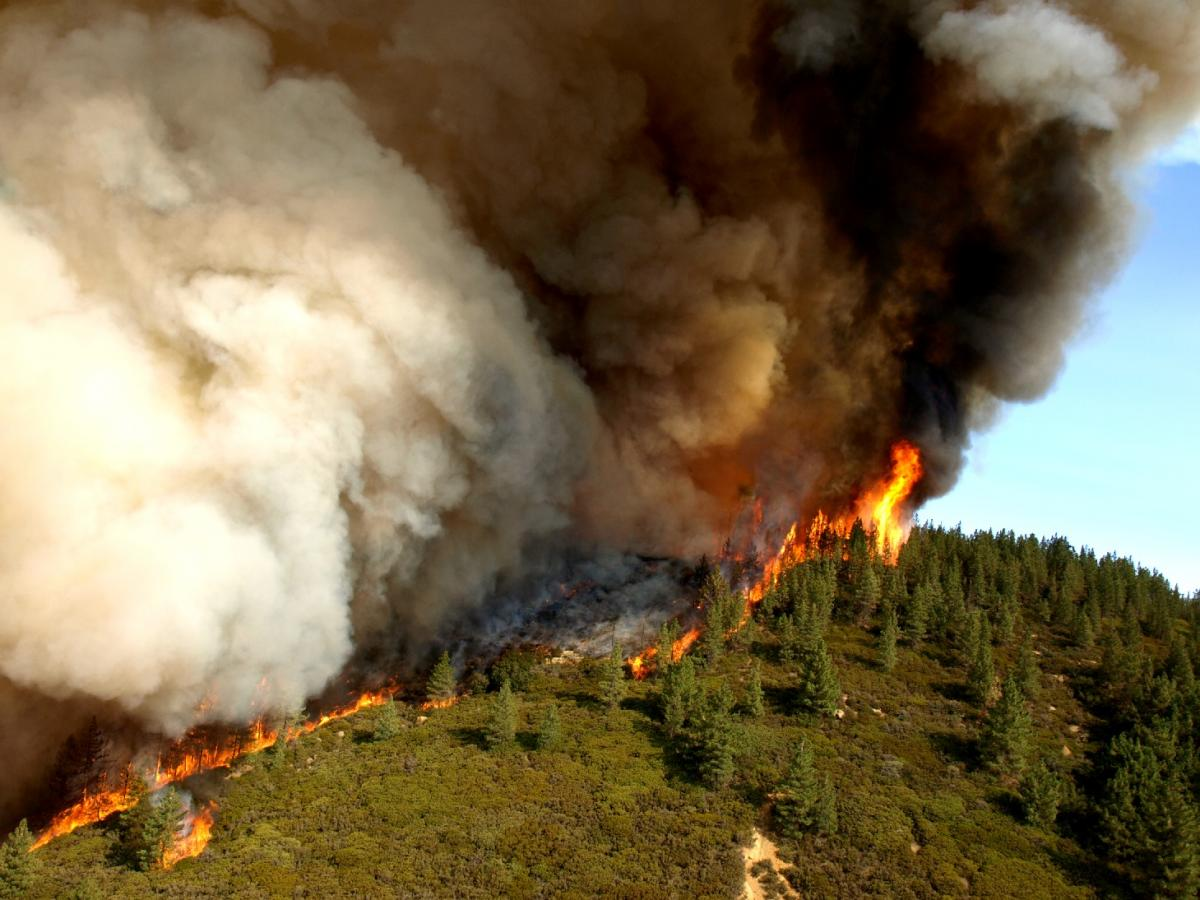
- An active flame front of the fire
- Date: July 4, 2007 –; October 29, 2007
- Location: San Rafael Mountains, Los Padres N.F., Santa Barbara County, California
- Coordinates: 34.7159°N 119.7828°W

Statistics
- Burned area: 240,207 acres (972 km^{2})

Impacts
- Deaths: 0
- Injuries: 43
- Structures destroyed: 1
- Cost: $118.3 million (2017 USD)

Ignition
- Cause: Sparks from a grinding machine on private property

Map
- The location of the Zaca Fire in Southern California.

The Zaca Fire was a very large wildfire in the San Rafael Mountains, northeast of the Santa Ynez Valley in Santa Barbara County, California. It was the single largest wildfire of the 2007 California wildfire season. The fire started on July 4, 2007, and by August 31, it had burned over 240,207 acres (972.083 km^{2}), making it California's second largest fire in recorded history at that time after the Cedar Fire of 2003. As of 2024, it is California's 13th-largest recorded fire in modern history. The fire was contained on September 4, 2007, with the fire being brought under control on October 29, 2007.

== Progression ==
On July 4, 2007, at 10:53 a.m. PDT, the Zaca Fire started as a result of sparks from a grinding machine at the Zaca Lake private corporate retreat, which was being used by a Zaca Lake Retreat Employee to repair a water pipe. It spread to a size of 240,207 acres (972.08 km^{2}) in August. By August 12, progress was being made on the fire through the combined efforts of firefighters and aircraft. Firefighters were able to turn the direction of the fire away from the Paradise Road community.

The Zaca Fire neared containment on September 2. On September 4, 2007, the fire had cost $117 million to fight, and was 100% contained. Hotspots within the fire perimeter continued to burn for over another month, until the Zaca Fire was fully brought under control on October 29, 2007. Of the 43 non-fatal injuries, 2 occurred when a helicopter assigned to the incident crashed.

== Effects ==
The fire had primarily burned away from populated areas in extremely steep and rugged areas of the San Rafael Mountains in the Los Padres National Forest and the Santa Ynez River Recreation Area. It only destroyed one Forest Service outbuilding. Its impacts on the environment and area water resources are not yet fully known. Many trails and campgrounds in the Dick Smith Wilderness were destroyed. Since then, a number of them have been rebuilt.

== See also ==
- October 2007 California wildfires
  - Witch Fire
- December 2017 California wildfires
  - Thomas Fire
