= Big Pine Mountain =

Mountain in the San Rafael Mountains, California

Highest point
- Elevation: 6803+ ft (2074+ m) NAVD 88
- Prominence: 2,160 ft (658 m)
- Listing: California county high points 33rd; Hundred Peaks Section
- Coordinates: 34°41′49″N 119°39′17″W

Geography
- Location: Santa Barbara County, California, U.S.
- Parent range: San Rafael Mountains
- Topo map: USGS Big Pine Mountain

Climbing
- Easiest route: Dirt Road

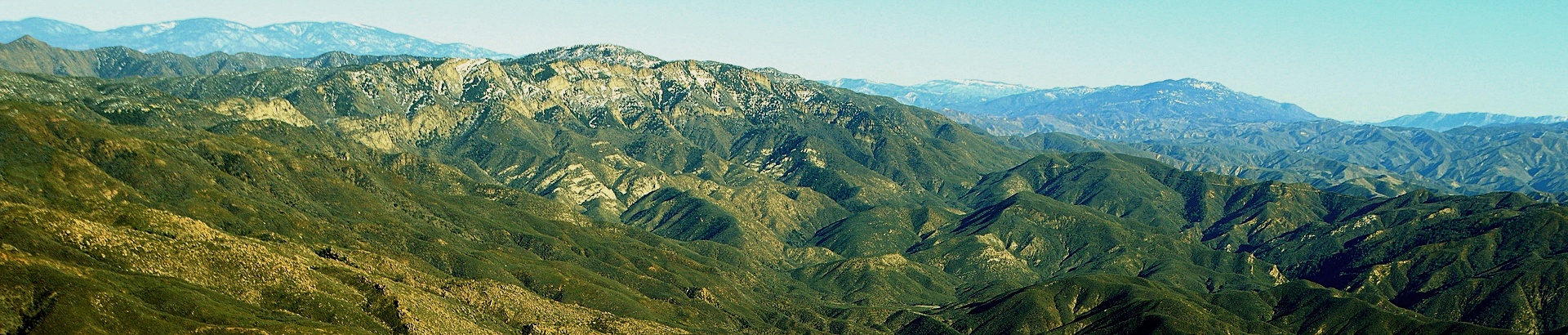
Big Pine, Reyes, and Pinos peaks area, aerial view

Big Pine Mountain is a mountain located in the San Rafael Mountains of the California Transverse Ranges. High enough to receive snowfall during the winter, the summit, at 6,803+ feet (2,074+ m), is the highest point in the San Rafael Mountains, the Dick Smith Wilderness, and Santa Barbara County. The peak and the surrounding area were severely impacted by the Zaca Fire in 2007.

== See also ==
- Los Padres National Forest
- List of highest points in California by county
