= San Rafael Mountains =

Mountain range of the Transverse Ranges in California, United States

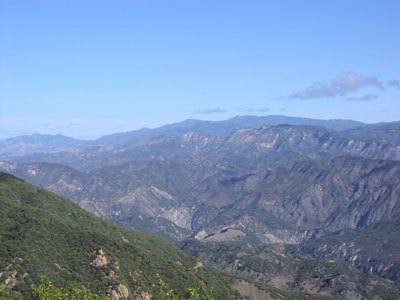
- San Rafael Mountains from near La Cumbre Peak with McKinley Mountain and San Rafael Mountain visible in the distance

Highest point
- Peak: Big Pine Mountain
- Elevation: 6,820 ft (2,080 m)
- Coordinates: 34°41′50″N 119°39′16″W

Geography
- Location within California
- Country: United States
- State: California
- District: Santa Barbara County
- Range coordinates: 34°42′38.951″N 119°48′51.495″W
- Parent range: Transverse Ranges system
- Topo map: USGS San Rafael Mountain
- Biome: California chaparral and woodlands

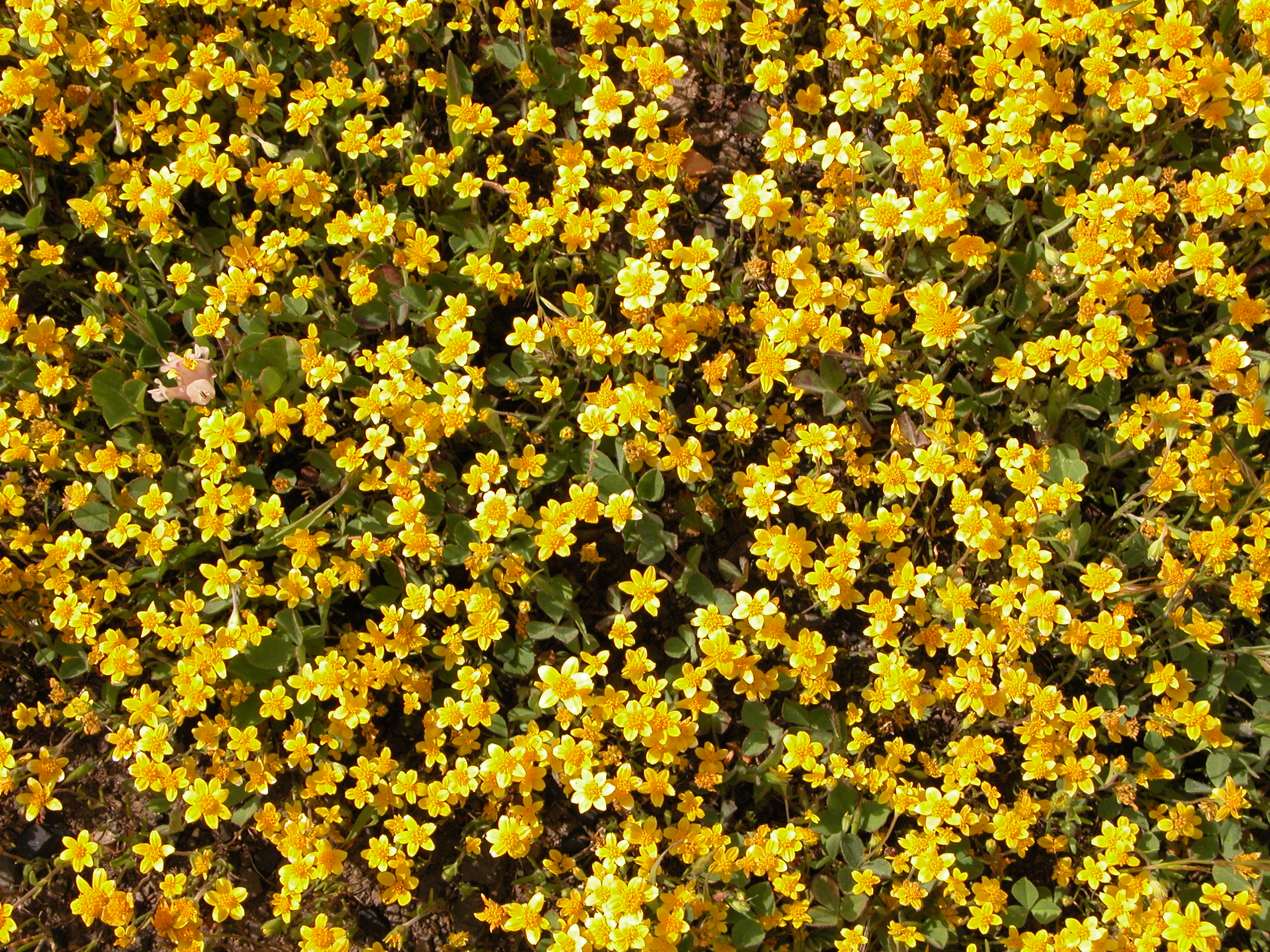
Wildflowers on Figueroa Mountain, 2005

The San Rafael Mountains are a mountain range in central Santa Barbara County, California, U.S., separating the drainages of the Santa Ynez River and the Santa Maria River. They are part of the Transverse Ranges system of Southern California which in turn are part of the Pacific Coast Ranges system of western North America.

== Geography ==
Most of the mountain range is within the Los Padres National Forest, and the northern slopes are included in the remote San Rafael Wilderness area.

The highest peaks include Big Pine Mountain (6,820 ft; 2,080 m), San Rafael Mountain (6,593 ft; 2,010 m) and McKinley Mountain (6,220 ft; 1,900 m), none of which are easily accessible except by foot or horse. The highest peak at the southern edge of the range is Little Pine Mountain.

Hurricane Deck is a spectacular block of sandstone that can be found deep in the San Rafael Wilderness.

The Sisquoc River headwaters are on the north slopes of Big Pine Mountain. It is a designated Wild and Scenic River of the United States, and a tributary of the Santa Maria River. Sisquoc Falls, 250 feet (76 m) high, is located on a tributary of the Sisquoc River to the west of Big Pine Mountain.

Climate is moderate, with hot dry summers (rare thunderstorms) and cool to cold wet winters. Snow sometimes falls on the higher slopes between December and March during frontal passages. Annual precipitation totals are between 15 and 25 inches.

=== Peaks ===
The six highest peaks of the San Rafael Mountains with more than 500 feet (150 m) of prominence, listed by height:

1. Big Pine Mountain, 6,820 feet (2,080 m)
2. San Rafael Mountain, 6,593 feet (2,010 m)
3. Madulce Peak, 6,539 feet (1,993 m)
4. Monte Arido, 6,013 feet (1,833 m)
5. Ortega Peak, 5,857 feet (1,785 m)
6. Figueroa Mountain 4,534 feet (1,382 m)

== Geology ==
The mountains mainly consist of sedimentary and metamorphic rocks, of Jurassic age or younger, though there are a few regions of igneous intrusions. Several prominent faults exist, including the Big Pine Fault, which trends eastward towards the San Andreas Fault about forty miles away.

== Habitats ==
The mountains are steep and rugged, and the lower slopes are dominated by chaparral. This ecosystem is naturally adapted to large, high-severity fires every 30 to 100 years or more. Nearly every area within the San Rafael Mountains has burned within the last century, largely due to an increase in human-caused ignitions. In the more shaded and moist canyons and northern slopes oak woodlands, bigcone Douglas-fir, and Coulter pine are found. Gray pine is also interspersed across the chaparral-dominated slopes.

Above the montane chaparral and woodlands ecosystem zone are stands of conifers of the mixed evergreen forest ecosystem. These stands are composed of Jeffrey pine, ponderosa pine, Coulter pine, sugar pine, singleleaf pinyon pine, white fir, and incense cedar. Snow is common in the winter above about 6,000 feet (1,800 m), though overall the climate of the mountain range is Mediterranean, with mild rainy winters and warm, dry summers.

== Human history ==
The earliest known residents of the San Rafael Mountains were the Chumash Indians, and evidence of their habitation consists of pictograph rock paintings in remote areas.

In historic times, mercury mining was conducted on portions of the southern slopes. Tailings from these old mines sometimes contain high levels of mercury, and environmental investigations have been conducted to determine if cleanup is necessary and feasible.

The central part of the mountains is included into Santa Ynez Recreation area, a part of Los Padres National Forest, and is a popular hiking destination, with a dozen campgrounds.

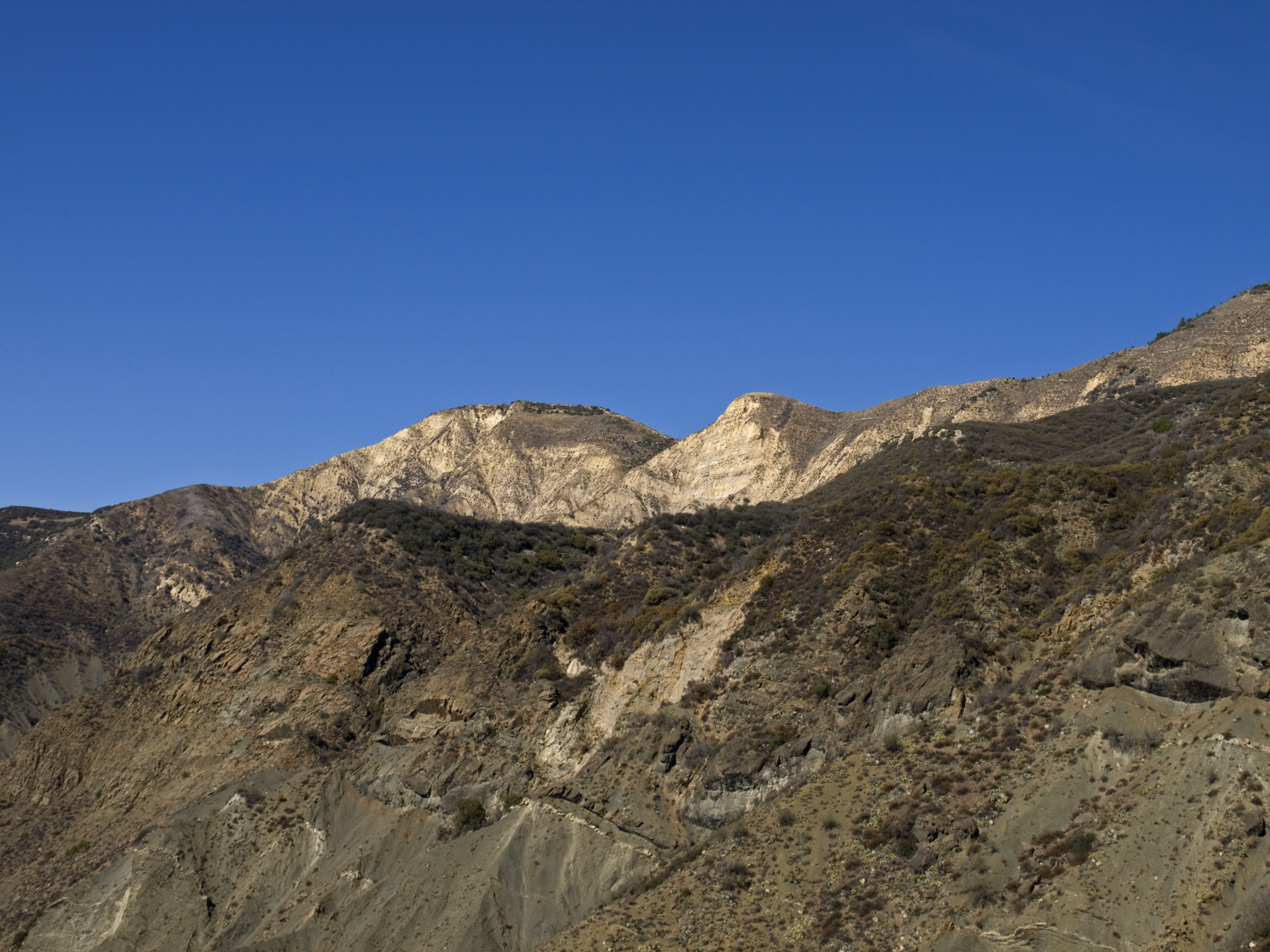
San Rafael Mountains between Alexander Peak and Little Pine Mountain

== See also ==
- Los Padres National Forest
- Santa Ynez Mountains
- Sierra Madre Mountains
- Mountain ranges of Santa Barbara County
