= Topaz Solar Farms =

Photovoltaic power station in San Luis Obispo County, California

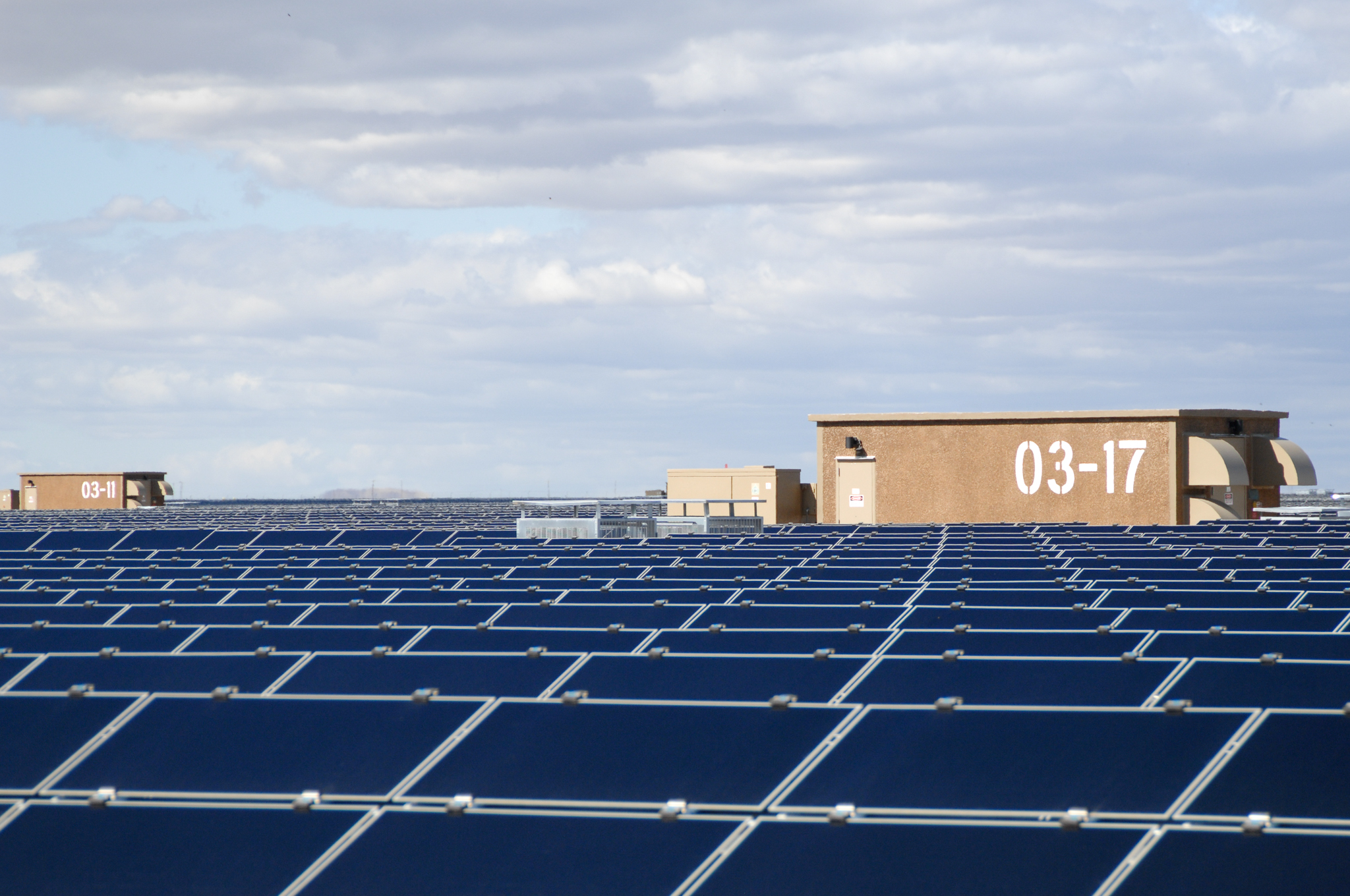
- Topaz Solar Farms solar panels
- Country: United States
- Location: Carrizo Plain, San Luis Obispo County, California
- Coordinates: 35°23′00″N 120°04′00″W
- Status: Operational
- Construction began: 2011
- Commission date: 2014
- Construction cost: $2.4 billion
- Owner: Berkshire Hathaway Energy

Solar farm
- Type: Flat-panel PV
- Site area: 4,700 acres (1,900 ha)

Power generation
- Nameplate capacity: 550 MW_{AC}
- Capacity factor: 26.6% (average 2015–2018)
- Annual net output: 1,282 GW·h, 272 MW·h/acre

External links
- Website: Topaz Solar Farm
- Commons: Related media on Commons

Topaz Solar Farms is a 550 megawatt (MW_{AC}) photovoltaic power station in San Luis Obispo County, California, United States. Construction on the project began in November 2011 and ended in November 2014. It is one of the world's largest solar farms. The $2.5 billion project includes 9 million CdTe photovoltaic modules based on thin-film technology, manufactured by U.S. company First Solar. The company also built, operates and maintains the project for BHE Renewables, a Berkshire Hathaway company. Pacific Gas and Electric will buy the electricity under a 25-year power purchase agreement. According to First Solar, it created about 400 construction jobs.

== History ==
OptiSolar, the instigator of the project, had optioned 9.5 square miles (25 km^{2}) of ranchland, In November 2009, First Solar announced that it had purchased options to an additional 640 acres (260 ha) from Ausra's canceled Carrizo Energy Solar Farm. First Solar would reconfigure the project to minimize the use of land covered by the Williamson Act.

The project uses nine million thin-film cadmium telluride PV panels designed and manufactured by First Solar. The plant's power would be generated during the middle of the day, when demand for electricity — and price — is much higher than at night. The project was expected to begin construction in 2011 and be fully operational by 2014. California utilities are mandated to get 33% of their energy from renewable sources by 2020.

On August 14, 2008, Pacific Gas and Electric Company announced agreements to buy the power from Topaz Solar Farms and High Plains Ranch. In late October 2010 the San Luis Obispo Department Planning and Building released a Draft Environmental Impact report.

In June 2011, the U.S. Department of Energy offered First Solar a $1.9 billion loan guarantee to cover part of the financing for the project. The First Solar project was not able to close its conditional loan guarantee with the Department of Energy prior to the September 30 deadline, but it has gone ahead anyway.

On May 18, 2012, First Solar announced the installation of the first PV panel. On October 24, 2012, First Solar announced the installation of the millionth panel. The plant began providing energy to the grid in February 2013. The five-millionth panel was installed in October 2013.

On January 10, 2019, with Pacific Gas and Electric Company facing billions of dollars in wildfire liabilities, S&P Global Ratings cut the credit rating of Berkshire Hathaway Energy's 550-megawatt Topaz Solar Farms to junk, noting that the plant counts on PG&E for all of its revenue.

== Electricity production ==
Generation (MW·h) of Topaz Solar
Year	Jan	Feb	Mar	Apr	May	Jun	Jul	Aug	Sep	Oct	Nov	Dec	annual
2013	–	239	24,499	18,660	31,026	40,465	47,772	58,441	53,196	47,407	39,423	40,180	401,308
2014	50,883	51,063	77,789	90,451	99,511	110,227	114,932	124,320	119,978	113,417	92,644	60,642	1,105,857
2015	89,663	92,944	108,663	114,979	103,163	123,704	130,249	133,000	120,634	111,211	93,907	79,220	1,301,337
2016	65,211	101,749	108,033	106,132	124,972	134,559	138,059	130,844	111,319	99,693	88,536	56,698	1,265,760
2017	57,880	42,375	95,639	108,198	128,816	132,016	129,836	121,997	122,106	117,862	90,225	90,582	1,237,532
2018	80,851	101,373	93,826	125,445	136,903	136,248	131,293	131,442	121,581	118,207	83,610	74,940	1,335,727
2019	75,557	70,097	97,868	117,138	110,050	132,501	135,100	132,926	122,489	116,268	83,008	62,720	1,255,722
2020	80,884	105,601	89,272	111,342	131,391	129,173	132,908	121,838	105,433	99,910	93,138	81,826	1,282,716
2021	80,602	102,438	113,865	129,378	125,496	129,930	125,876	126,904	113,280	104,030	90,423	58,566	1,300,788
2022	82,528	85,869	99,289	109,589	120,298	119,141	117,439	122,679	108,528	108,197	85,998	61,855	1,221,410
2023	53,303	68,355	56,145	92,581	102,331	100,762	110,169	108,215	103,260	98,178	77,965	65,510	1,036,774
2024	66,881	71,784	79,489	81,331	100,010	107,528	116,425	123,491	110,236	81,558	59,396	72,947	1,071,076
2025	84,418	41,228	45,823	60,068	104,354	104,328	127,760	115,632	103,512	83,607	73,838	73,996	1,018,564
2026	83,665	61,168	58,963										
Average Annual Production (years 2015-2019) --->													1,279,216

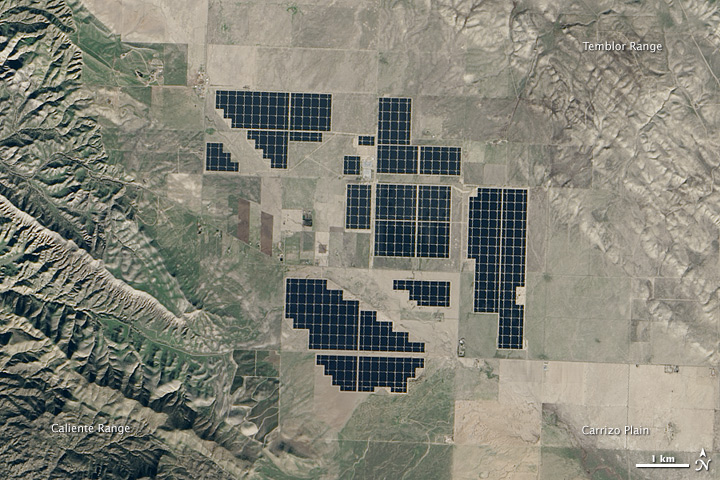
Topaz Solar Farms from space. NASA Earth Observatory image, 2015.

== Gallery ==
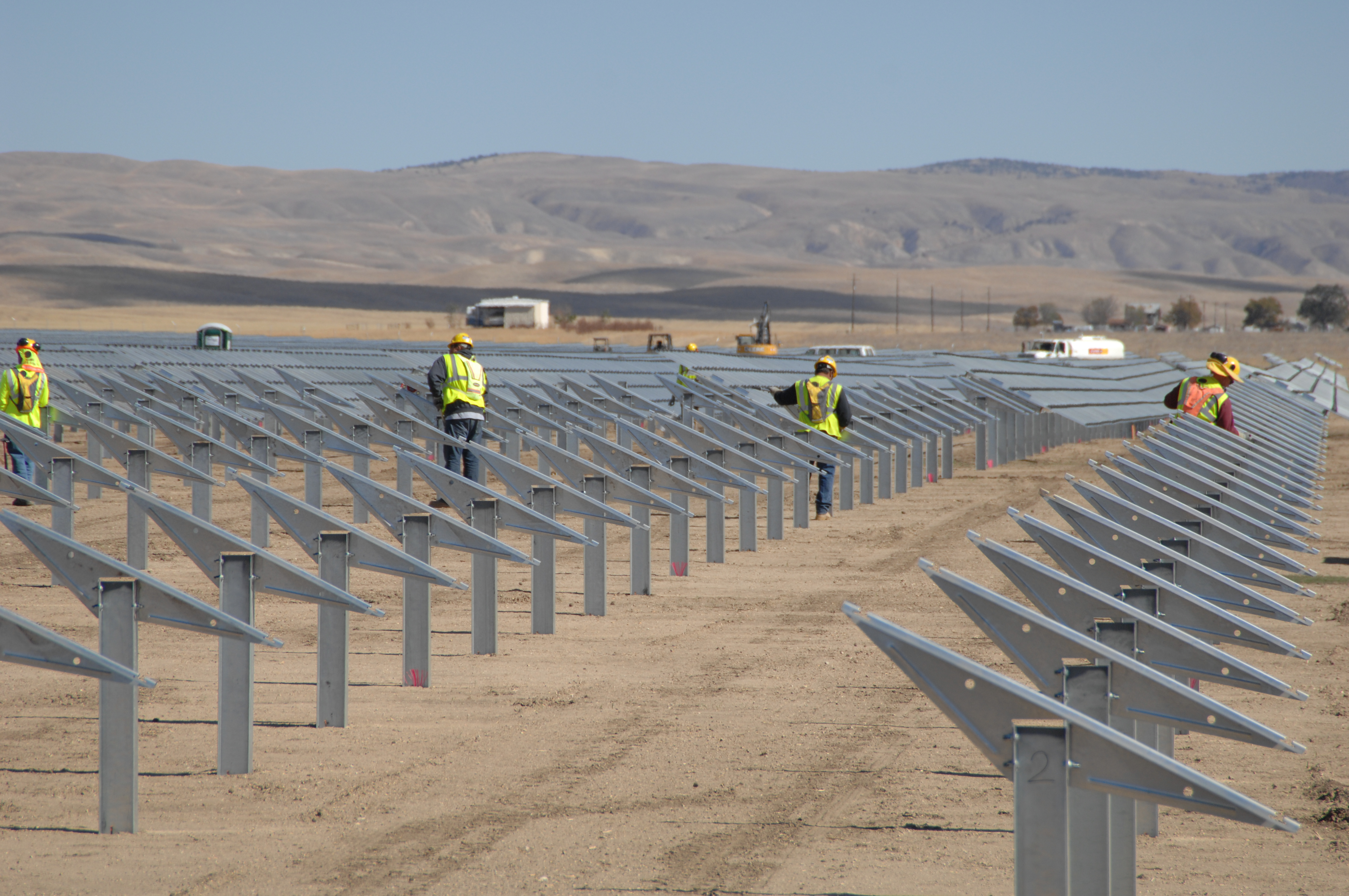
Construction in 2012

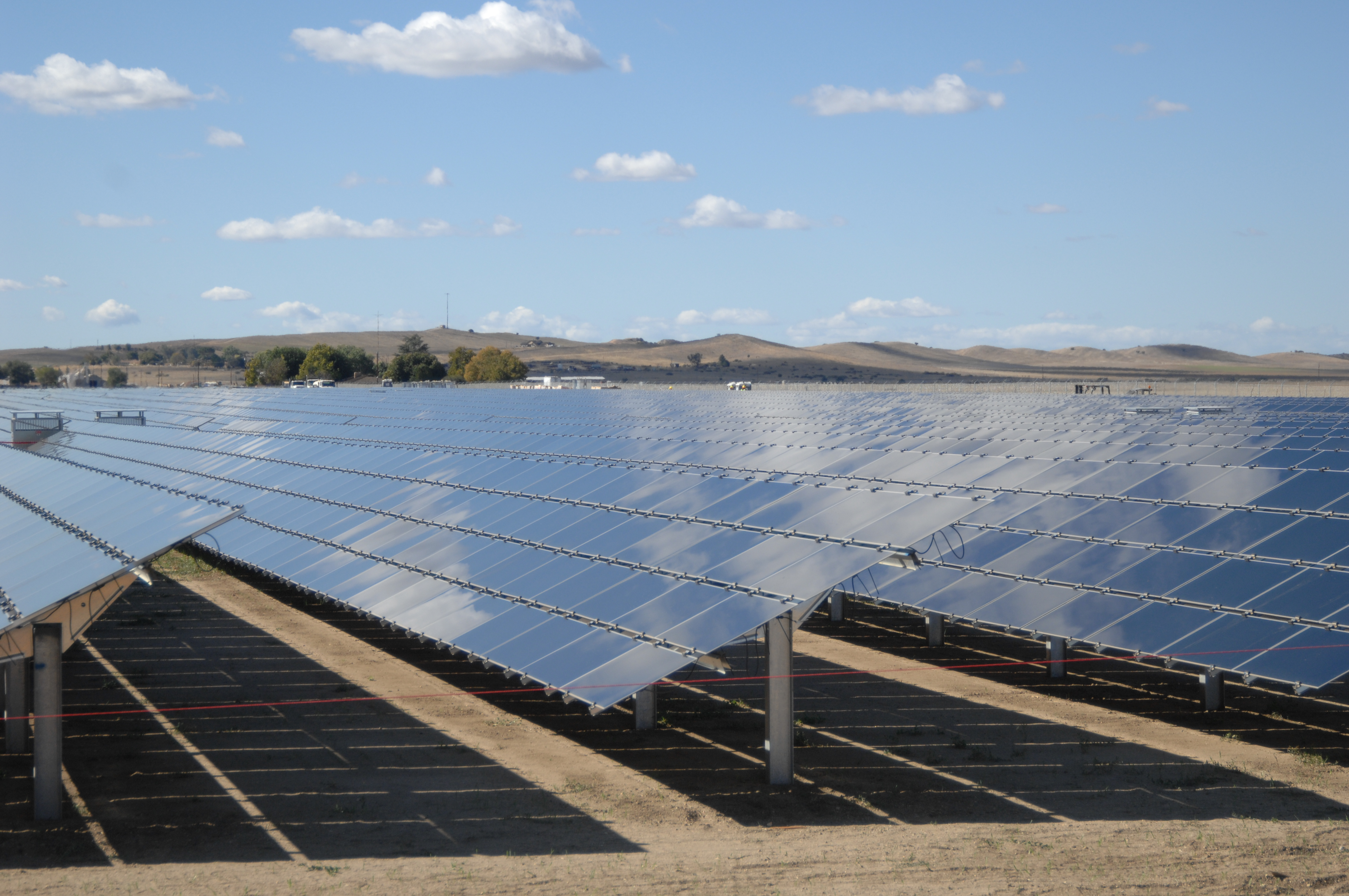
Solar panels at Topaz Solar 1

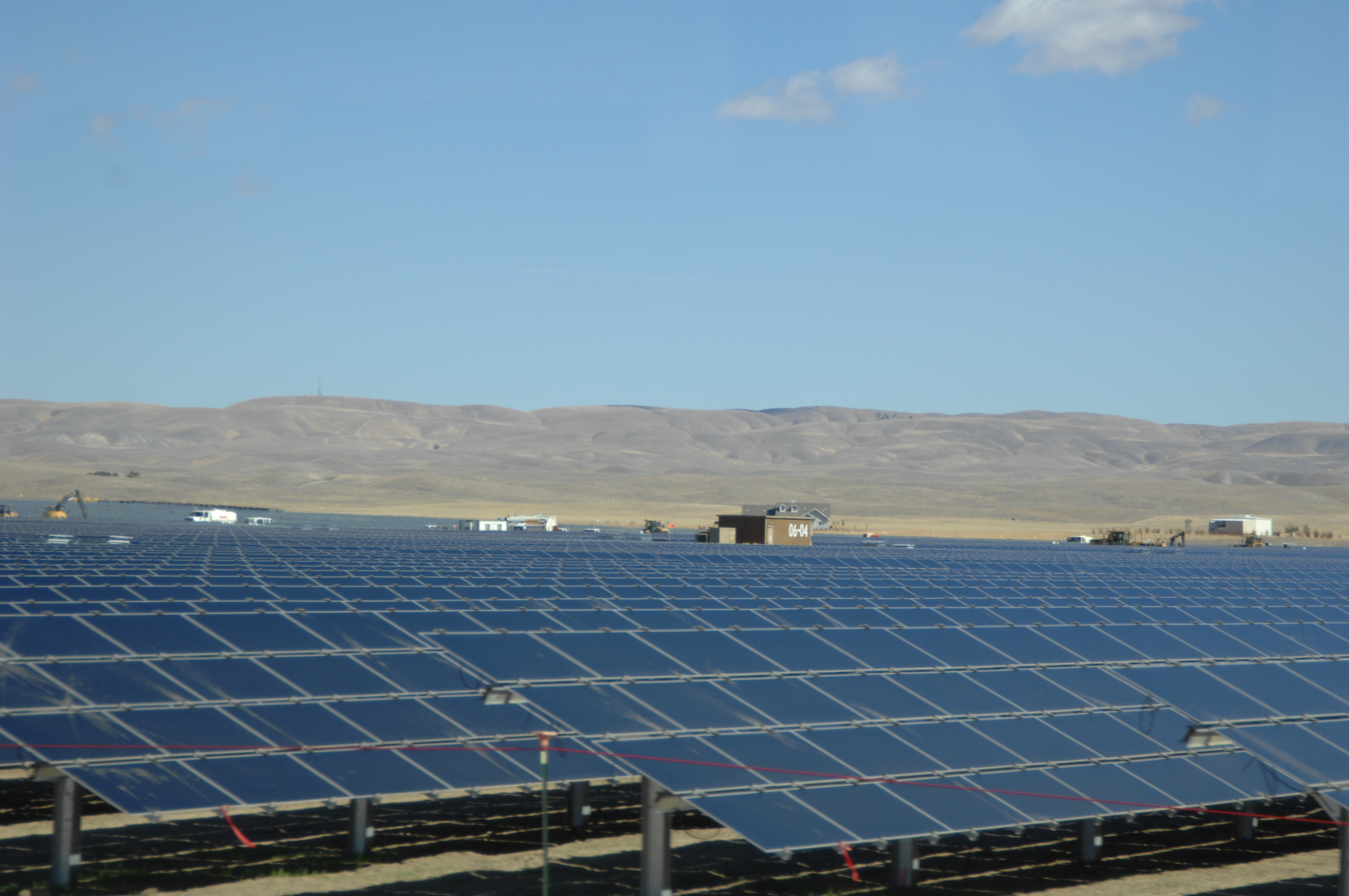
Solar Panels at Topaz Solar 7

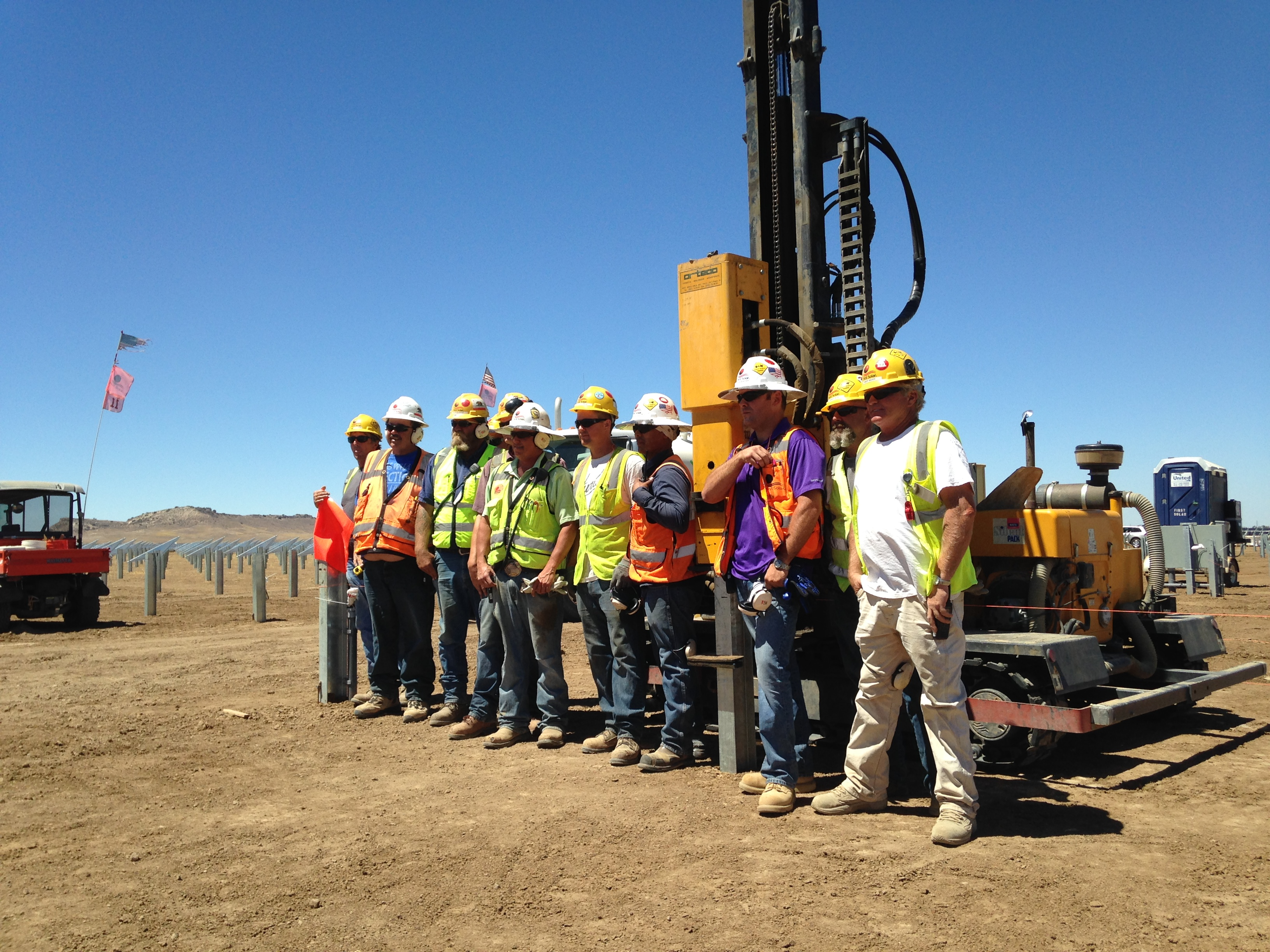
Post Crew installing last post on Aug 15, 2014. Post Number 850,280

== See also ==
- California Valley Solar Ranch
- Carrizo Energy Solar Farm
- Desert Sunlight Solar Farm
- Solar power in California
