= Carrizo Plain =

Grassland plain in central California

Carrizo Plain National Monument
- Llano Estero (Spanish); tšɨłkukunɨtš (Obispeño)
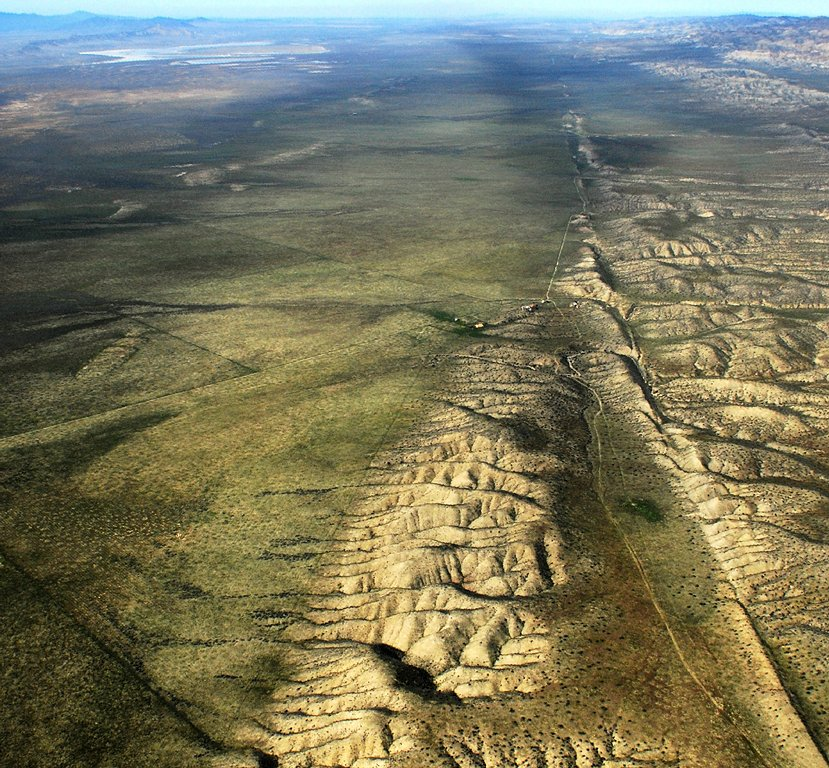
- Aerial view of the Carrizo Plain. The San Andreas Fault is on the right.

- Location within southern California Location within California Location within the United States
- Interactive map of Carrizo Plain National Monument
- Location: San Luis Obispo & Kern counties, California
- Nearest city: California Valley, California
- Coordinates: 35.1913582°N 119.7929080°W
- Area: 246,812 acres (998.81 km^{2})
- Established: January 17, 2001
- Governing body: Bureau of Land Management
- Website: Carrizo Plain National Monument
- Carrizo Plain Rock Art Discontiguous District
- U.S. National Register of Historic Places
- U.S. National Historic Landmark District
- Area: 1215
- NRHP reference No.: 01000509

Significant dates
- Added to NRHP: May 23, 2001
- Designated NHLD: March 2, 2012

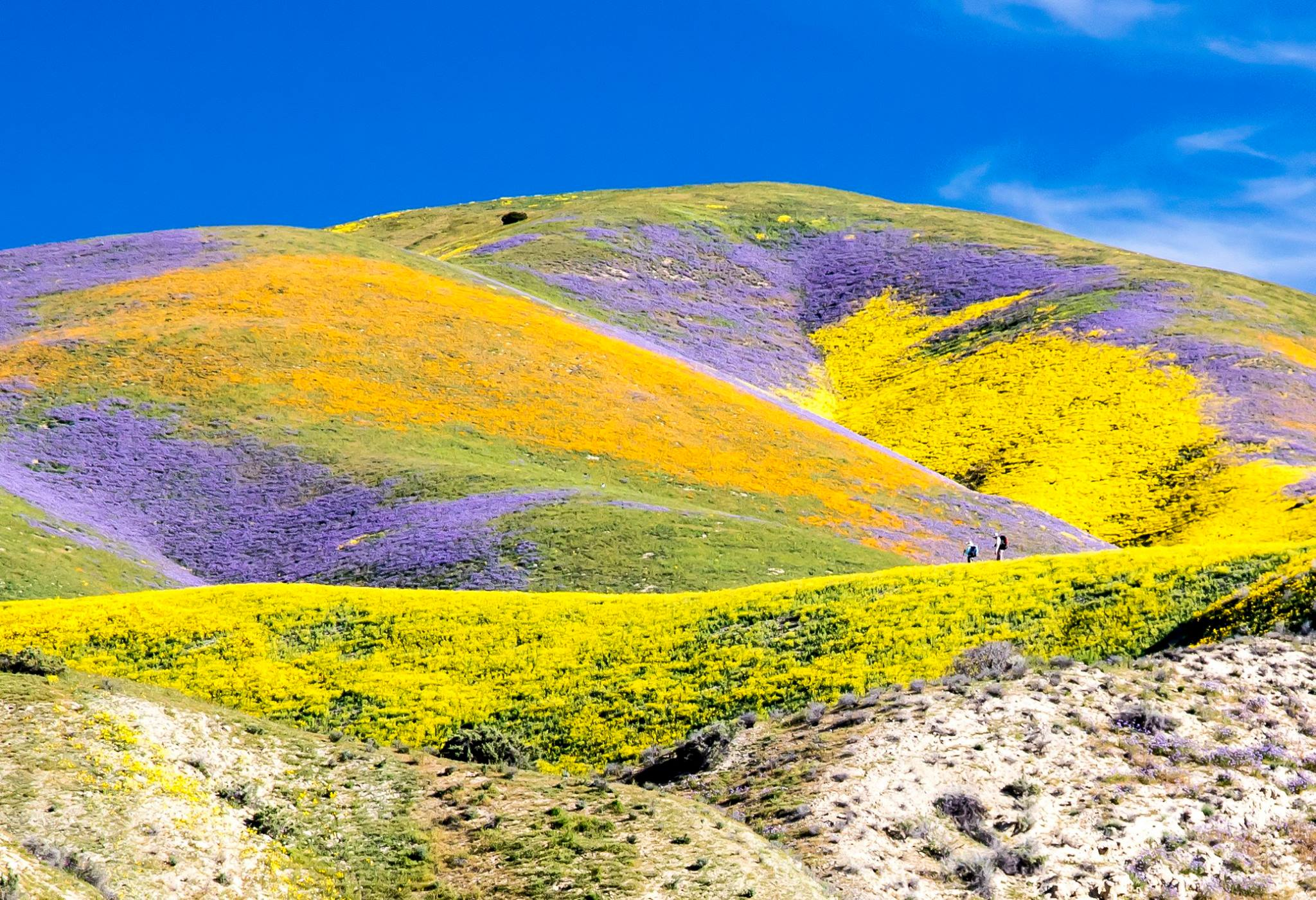
Superbloom in the Temblor Range, April 2017

The Carrizo Plain (Obispeño: tšɨłkukunɨtš, "Place of the rabbits") is a large enclosed grassland plain, approximately 50 miles (80 km) long and up to 15 miles (24 km) across, in southeastern San Luis Obispo County, California, United States, about 100 miles (160 km) northwest of Los Angeles. The southern portion of the Carrizo Plain is within the 246,812-acre (99,881 ha) Carrizo Plain National Monument, which also includes most of the Caliente Range. The Carrizo Plain is the largest single native grassland remaining in California. It includes Painted Rock in the Carrizo Plain Rock Art Discontiguous District, which is listed on the National Register of Historic Places. In 2012, it was further designated a National Historic Landmark for its archaeological value. The San Andreas Fault occurs along the eastern edge of the Carrizo Plain at the western base of the Temblor Range.

The plain is enclosed between the Temblor Range to the northeast and the Caliente Range to the southwest and drains inward to Soda Lake, a closed alkali basin with no outlet. The climate is semi-arid, with 7 to 10 inches (178 to 254 mm) of rain a year falling mostly between November and April; in wet years the plain produces wildflower displays that draw visitors from across the state. Surveys of the monument have recorded 51 vegetation alliances, most of them shrub-dominated, with juniper and oak woodland on the surrounding slopes. The grassland supports species that have lost most of their range elsewhere in the San Joaquin Valley, among them the giant kangaroo rat, San Joaquin antelope squirrel and pronghorn.

The territories of the Chumash, Salinan and Yokuts peoples met on the plain, and the pictographs at Painted Rock, made over a span of some three thousand years, are among the most significant rock art in North America. Europeans settled from the 1860s, running wheat and cattle, but rising costs ended most farming by 1980 and the land passed to the federal government and The Nature Conservancy. President Bill Clinton proclaimed the national monument on January 12, 2001. Oil and gas leasing, solar development and grazing have all been contested on the plain since.

== Geography ==
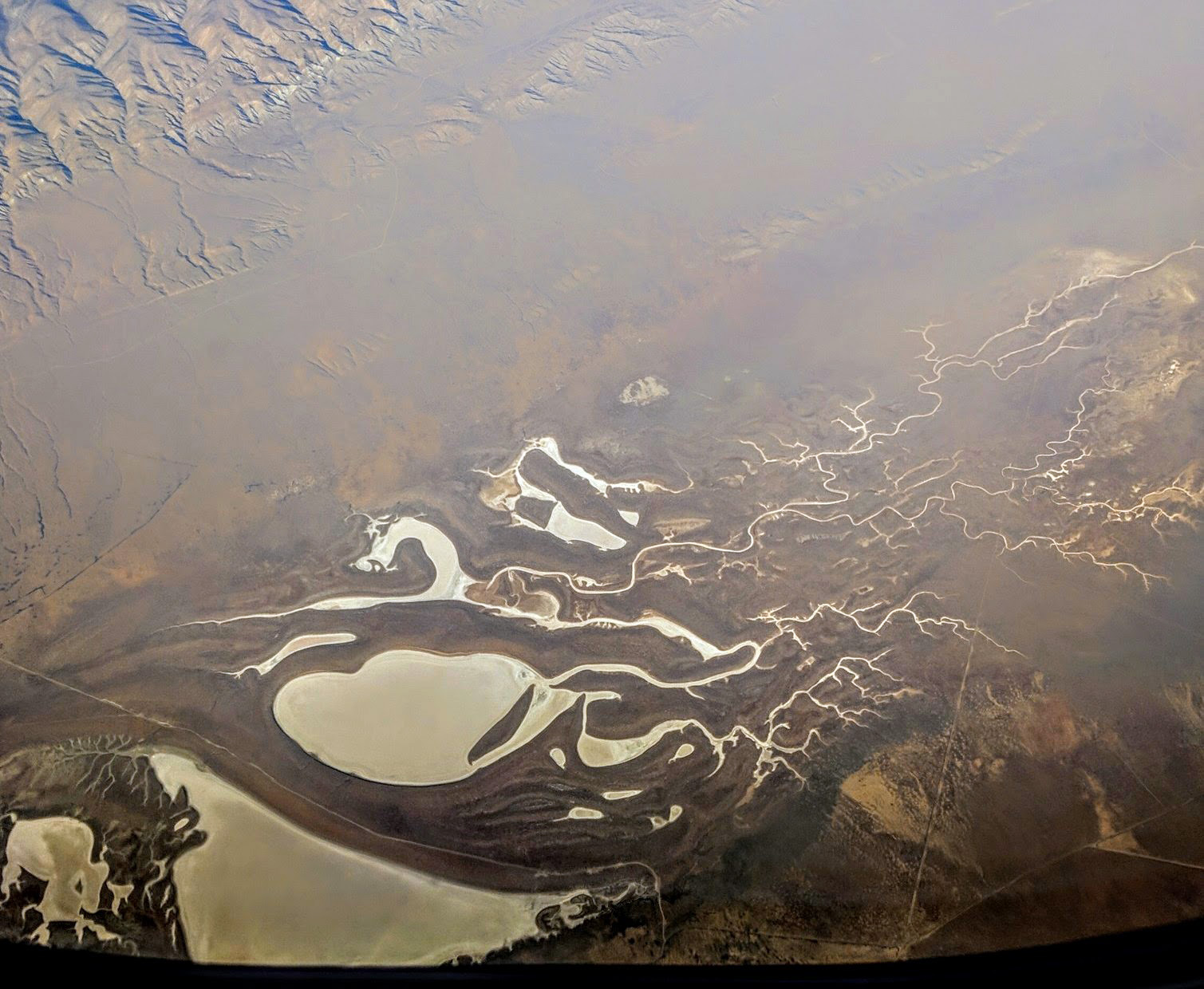
Aerial view of the south end of Soda Lake in Carrizo Plain National Monument

The Carrizo Plain extends northwest from the town of Maricopa, following the San Andreas Fault. Bordering the plain to the northeast is the Temblor Range, on the other side of which is California's Central Valley. Bordering the plain to the southwest is the Caliente Range. The community of California Valley is in the northern part of the plain. The average elevation of the plain is about 2,200 feet (670.6 m). Soda Lake, a 3,000-acre (12 km^{2}) alkaline lake, is in the center of the plain with the popular Painted Rock containing Chumash and Yokuts rock art nearby. As the central depression in an enclosed basin, Soda Lake receives all of the runoff from both sides of the plain. At 5,106 feet (1,556 m), Caliente Mountain, southwest of the plain, stands as the highest point in San Luis Obispo County. The climate type of the Carrizo Plain is semi-arid grassland, and annual rainfall is around 9 inches (230 mm). The valley floor is treeless; juniper, oak and riparian woodland occur on the surrounding slopes and canyons rather than on the plain itself.

The Carrizo Plain is an easily accessible place to see surface fractures of the San Andreas Fault; they are clearly visible along the eastern side of the plain, at the foot of the Temblor Range. They are best seen in early-morning and evening light, when shadows accentuate the topography. In addition to its spring wildflower displays, Carrizo Plain is also famous for Painted Rock, a sandstone alcove adorned with pictographs created by the Chumash people around 2000 BC.

=== Wallace Creek ===
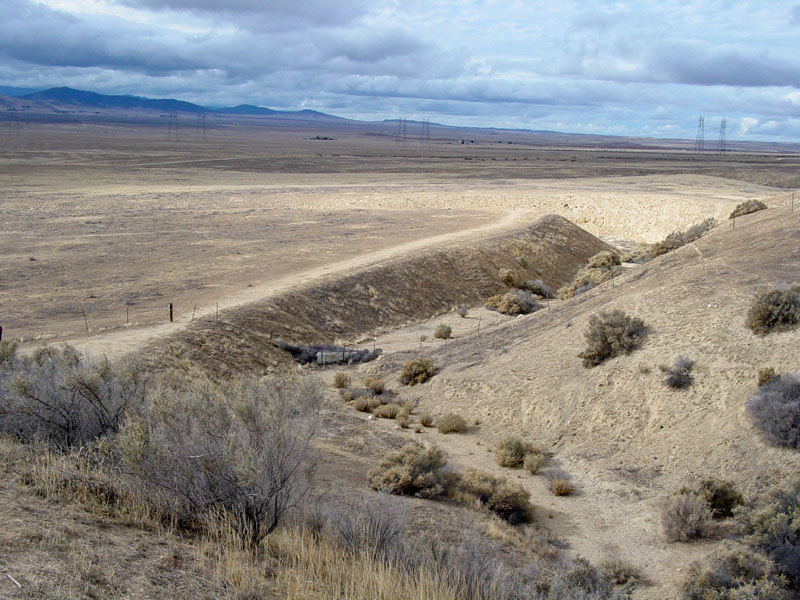
Wallace Creek offset by the San Andreas Fault, by about 430 feet (131 meters) in the last 3,700 years.

Wallace Creek is a small stream that drains into Soda Lake and remains dry most of the year. It drains perpendicular to the San Andreas Fault, and the creek bed is currently offset by 425 ft (130 m) due to the movement of the fault. About 23 ft (7 m) of the displacement was created during the 1857 Fort Tejon earthquake. The current segment began forming 3,700 years ago. Sometime between 1540 and 1630 A.D., the creek was offset by about 40.6 feet (12.4 m) feet in an even larger earthquake.

Two other older creek beds lie 1,560 and 1,310 ft (475 and 399 m) northwest along the San Andreas Fault. The first creek bed was formed around 13,000 years ago, when climate change carved it into a large, active alluvial fan. The second bed was formed about 11,000 years ago. Sieh and Jahns measured an offset of about 130 metres (427 ft) accumulated over roughly the past 3,400 years, giving the first slip rate determined along the San Andreas Fault; a later re-excavation of their trenches reproduced the rate within measurement uncertainty.

Geologists have carefully studied the creek to identify a correlation between the offset and historical events, such as earthquakes, along the San Andreas Fault. Although Wallace Creek is not the only creek that the San Andreas Fault has offset, it is the most spectacular.

=== Access ===
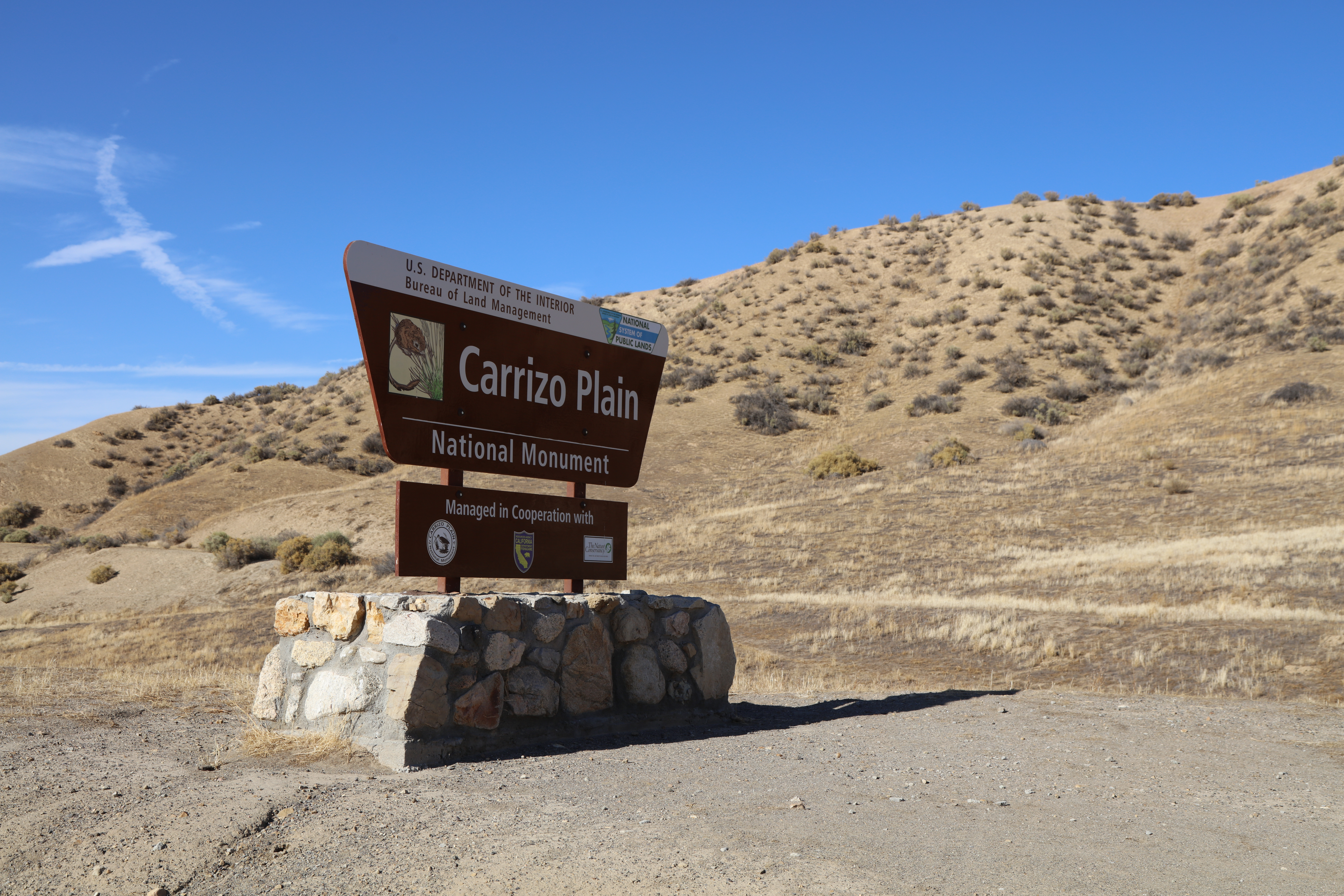
Entrance to National Monument

State Route 166 passes the south entrance to the Carrizo Plain, and State Route 58 crosses through the northern portion. Connecting them is the narrow Soda Lake Road, the only dependable passable road through the plain. Still, even this may become impassable during or soon after a rain, since the middle portion is gravel.

=== Climate ===
The plain has a semi-arid climate, with warm dry summers and cool wet winters. The Bureau of Land Management records average summer temperatures ranging from the low 50s °F at night to the upper 90s during the day, with daytime readings often above 100 °F (38 °C) and a record high of 115 °F (46 °C). Winter averages run from highs in the mid 60s to lows in the mid 30s, and the record low is 0 °F (−18 °C).

Rainfall on the valley floor averages between 7 and 10 inches (178 and 254 mm) a year and falls mostly between November and April, with occasional snow. Totals vary widely from year to year, and the wet winters that produce the plain's wildflower displays are irregular.

== Geology ==
=== San Andreas Fault ===
The most prominent geologic feature of the Carrizo Plain is the San Andreas Fault, which runs along the northeast side of the plain, at the base of the Elkhorn Scarp. The section of the fault in the Carrizo Plain is the oldest section along the entire fault zone. Displacement on the San Andreas is responsible for the development of distinctive features, including shutter ridges, diverted or decapitated stream channels, and sag ponds. One feature relating to the San Andreas Fault and aligned to it in the Carrizo Plain is the Dragon's Back pressure ridge.

=== Other faults ===
The Big Spring Fault, the San Juan Fault, the Morales Fault, and the White Rock Fault are small faults that run parallel to the San Andreas Fault along the Caliente Range on the western boundary of the Carrizo Plain.

=== Soil taxonomy ===
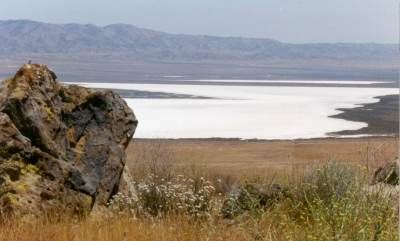
Soda Lake, view to southeast

The parent materials for soils in the Carrizo Plain are predominantly alluvium deposits. Alluvium is soil that has been deposited by rivers or flowing water. The Paso Robles formation is a Pleistocene-aged alluvium deposit that reaches up to 3,000 ft (900 m) thick near the San Andreas fault and thins out toward the north and west. The Paso Robles formation is a well-known aquifer that has been reliably productive for ground wells throughout the area. The upper layers of soil are more recent alluvium. This recent layer is thickest near Soda Lake and thins out toward the mountains to the east and west. Throughout the valley, the soil composition varies greatly and includes clay loams, silty clay loams, loams, sandy loams, and gravelly loams. The sandier soils tend to occur near the valley slopes and provide better drainage, while the soils with more clay are located on the valley floor near Soda Lake and have much poorer drainage. The soils in the Carrizo Plain have very low fertility because of their high alkalinity content and low rainfall due to the semi-arid climate.

== Flora ==
The plain carries a wide range of plant communities, from playas and alkali herbaceous flats through grassland and semi-desert scrub to shrubby hillsides and stands of woodland.

Between 2005 and 2010 the California Native Plant Society and the California Department of Fish and Game, with funding from the Bureau of Land Management, carried out baseline vegetation surveys across more than 245,000 acres (99,148 ha) of the national monument. The work drew on 1,019 field surveys, 45 long-term monitoring plots and more than a thousand reconnaissance points, and produced a floristic classification of the area.

The survey identified 51 vegetation alliances in the monument, of which three were newly described and three provisional. More than thirty of them are shrub-dominated, among them several chaparral and semi-desert scrub types. Four are tree alliances, covering juniper and oak stands and riparian woodland, and thirteen are herbaceous, including wetland and perennial types together with the annual forblands and grasslands that produce the plain's wildflower displays.

== Fauna ==
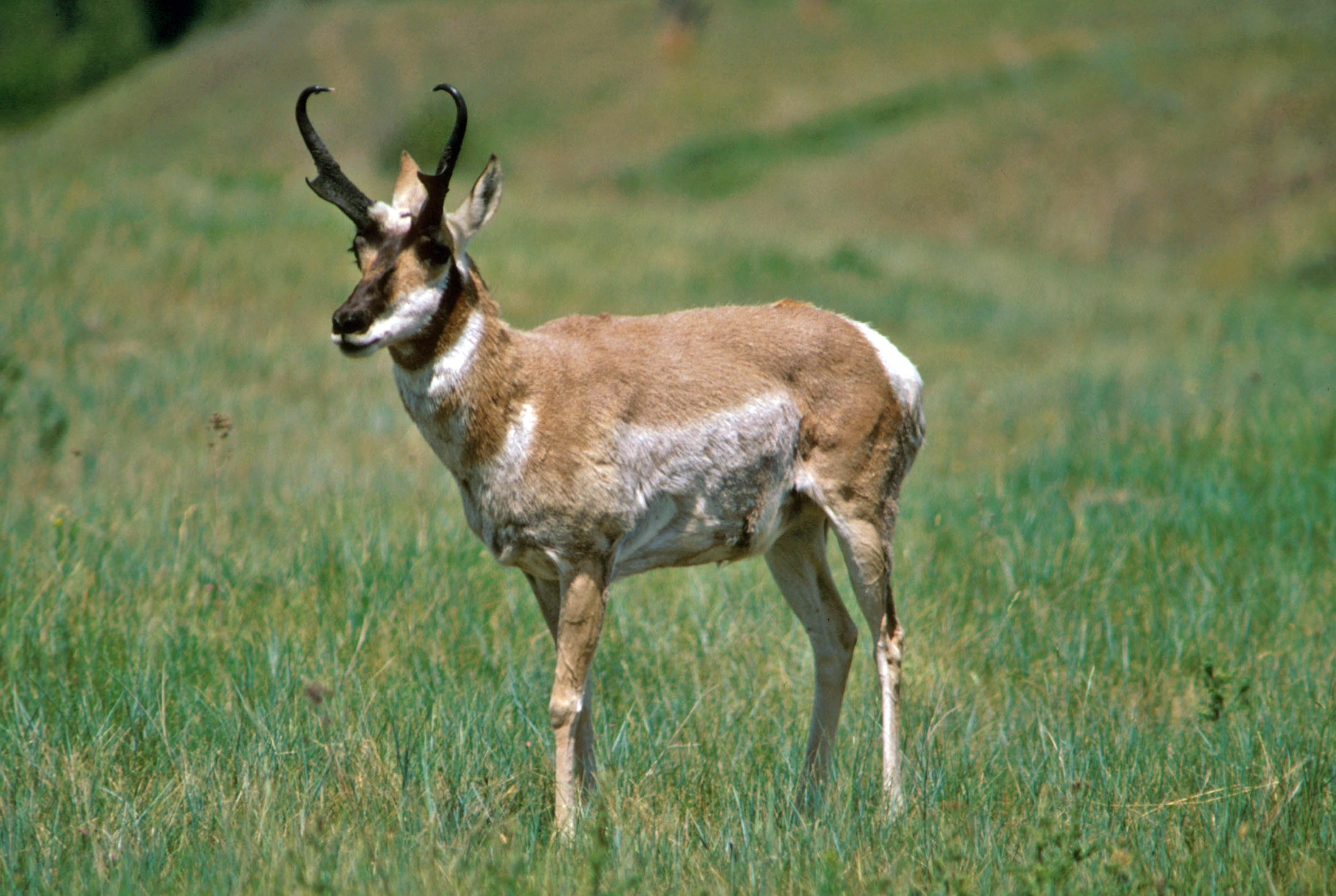
Pronghorn

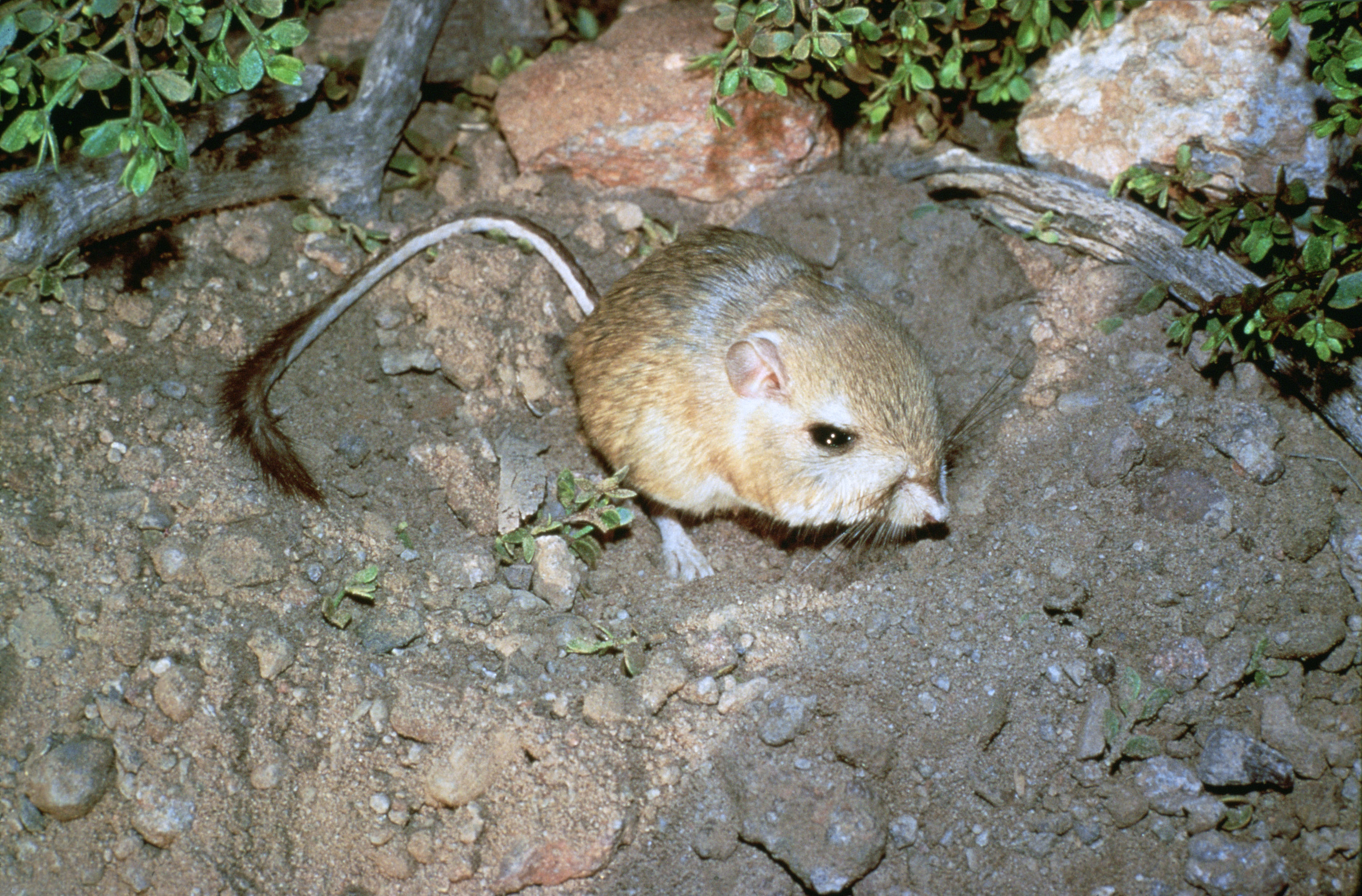
Giant kangaroo rat

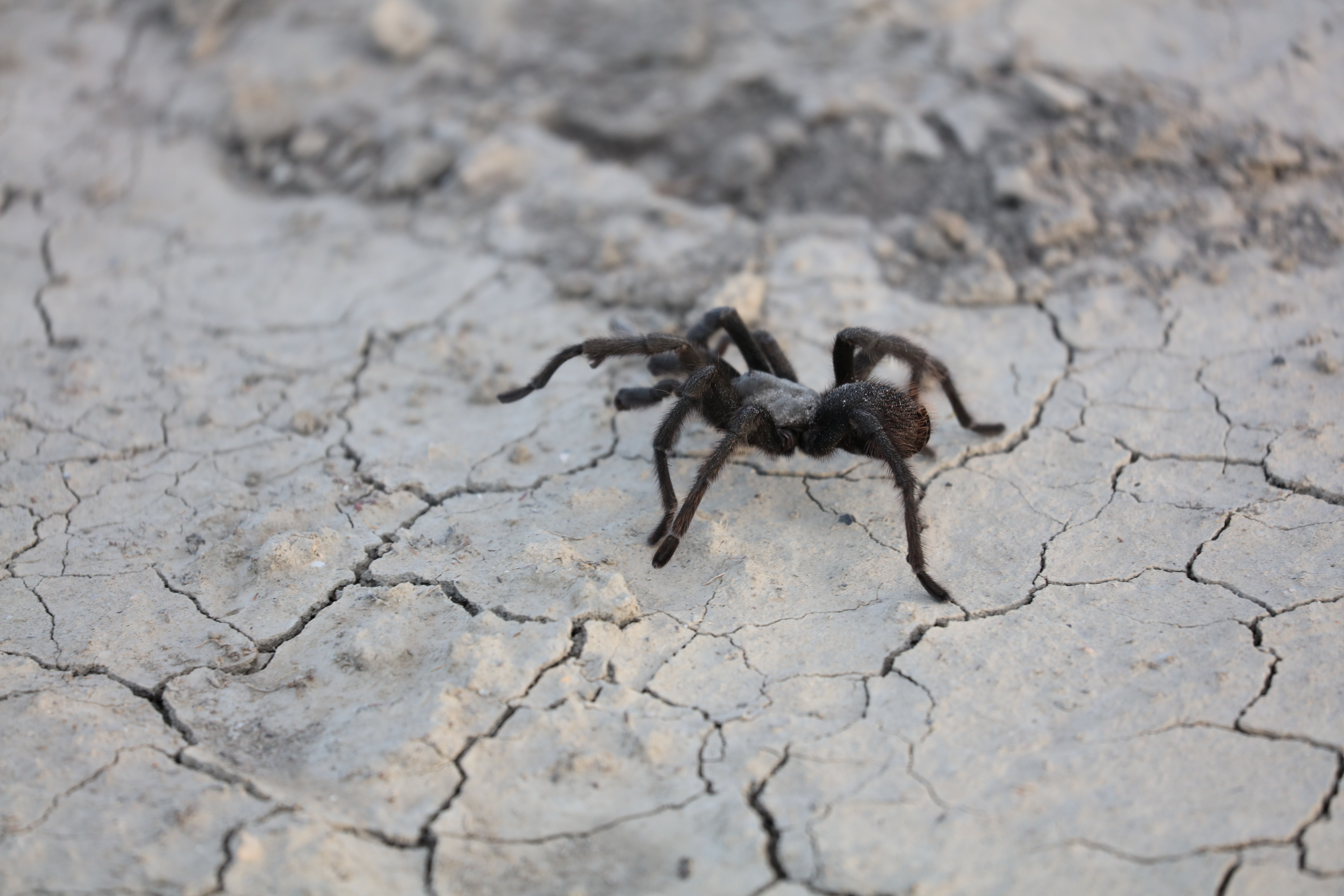
California ebony tarantula (Aphonopelma eutylenum) near Soda Lake

The Carrizo Plain is home to 13 species listed as endangered either by the state or federal government, the largest concentration of endangered species in California. Some of these species include the San Joaquin kit fox, the San Joaquin antelope squirrel, the blunt-nosed leopard lizard, the giant kangaroo rat, greater and lesser sandhill cranes, and the California condor. The tule elk, pronghorn, black-tailed jackrabbit, western coyotes, and Le Conte's thrasher all also make their homes in the Carrizo Plain. The hotter climate and ecology of Carrizo Plain allows the Le Conte's thrasher of the Southwestern United States to have a small disjunct range farther north than normal.

- San Joaquin kit fox – a small nocturnal subspecies of the kit fox that was formerly common throughout the San Joaquin Valley but has recently become endangered.
- Blunt-nosed leopard lizard – a small, 3–5 inch gray to brown lizard with large dark spots and cream-colored cross bands. It has a broad, triangular-shaped head and is endemic to California. It inhabits the grasslands and alkali flats of the San Joaquin Valley and the surrounding foothills and valleys.
- Giant kangaroo rat – the largest of all kangaroo rats. The giant kangaroo rat is also endemic to California and now only occupies about 2% of its original range, making it critically endangered.
- San Joaquin antelope squirrel – a light tan squirrel with a white belly and a white stripe down its back and sides. Most of its habitat is used for agriculture, making the Carrizo Plain home to most of the remaining population.

== History ==
=== Indigenous peoples ===
The plain lies where the territories of the Chumash, Salinan and Yokuts met, and the Bureau of Land Management records that Chumash, Yokuts and other native peoples lived, hunted and traded in this part of central California. The pictographs at Painted Rock were made over a long period, some painted over earlier images, and are estimated to be between 200 and 3,000 years old; the agency describes the style as among the most impressive in North America.

Three colors dominate the paintings: red from locally occurring hematite ochre, black from wood charcoal, and white from diatomaceous shale or gypsum, both found in the area. Bedrock mortars at the site were used to process seeds and nuts, and the rock remains sacred to the descendant peoples, who continue to visit it. Graffiti and gunshot damage over the past century, together with erosion, bird droppings and honeybee activity, have destroyed or damaged some of the paintings.

=== Ranching and farming ===
The Santa Margarita Historical Society records that the first Europeans to live permanently on the plain were the family of Chester Rude Brumley. Brumley managed land for the absentee owner James McDonald before acquiring the ranch known as El Saucito, where in 1876 he built a two-story house that still stands. He died in 1888.

Wheat became the mainstay of the plain, with cattle run on ground too steep to cultivate, and a farming community grew up around the Simmler crossroads to the north. Costs turned against the growers after the Second World War: grain prices rose only slightly between 1940 and 1980 while diesel went from 25 cents a gallon to several dollars, and the price of a tractor rose from about seven thousand dollars in 1935 to a hundred thousand by 1980. Larger machinery let farmers work more ground, but it also meant a poor crop could end a farm.

By 1980 much of the drier southern part of the plain had been sold to the Oppenheimer Corporation, which sold stock to investors seeking tax write-offs; when the tax rules changed the company sold the land on to the federal government and to The Nature Conservancy, which in turn sold to the government. The transfer was contested locally, because land that had been available for grazing leases no longer was, leaving farmers north of Highway 58 under financial pressure. As cultivation in the south ended and grazing was restricted the vegetation changed and some wildlife declined; sandhill cranes that had long migrated through the plain stopped arriving.

== Carrizo Plain National Monument ==
=== Management—historical overview ===
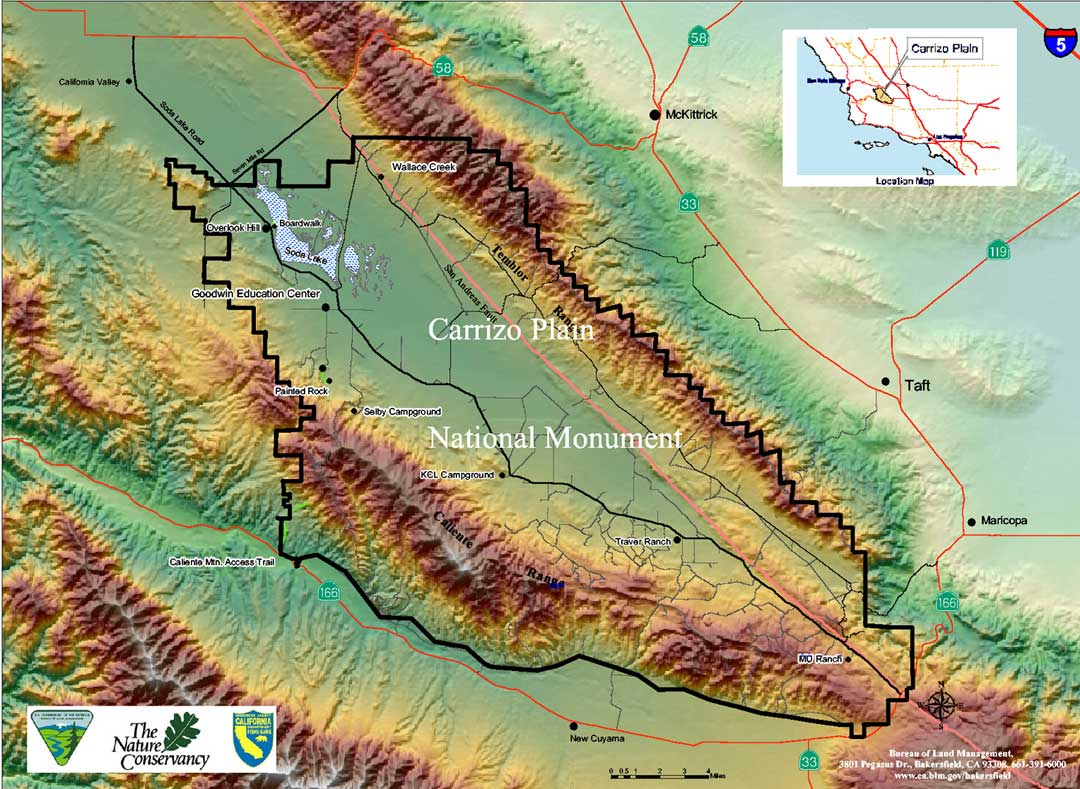
Map

In 1988, U.S. Bureau of Land Management (BLM), the California Department of Fish and Game (DFG), and the Nature Conservancy (TNC) partnered together to purchase an 82,000-acre (332 km^{2}) parcel of Carrizo Plain land. This joint effort ensured the protection of the plain. In 1996, the Carrizo Plain Management Partners again created a joint initiative, the Carrizo Plain Natural Area (CPNA) Plan. The goal of this plan was to:

1. Establish long-term mission and vision statements that reflect the long-term objectives of the CPNA,
2. Outline objectives and goals for the life of this plan that will help to achieve the mission,
3. Consolidate a descriptive inventory of area resources and outline appropriate public uses of those resources,
4. Provide an overview of operations, maintenance, and personnel needs to assist in developing annual work plans and budgeting for implementation of plan goals.

On January 12, 2001, President Bill Clinton signed a presidential proclamation establishing the Carrizo Plain as a national monument. The first manager of the new Carrizo Plain National Monument was Marlene Braun (1958–2005); Johna Hurl succeeded her. The CPNA's managerial partners assumed responsibility for maintaining the new national monument. Since then, the area of protected land has increased to 250,000 acres (1,012 km^{2}).

=== Carrizo Plain Natural Area Plan ===
==== Mission statement ====
"Manage the Carrizo Plain Natural Area (CPNA) so that indigenous species interact within a dynamic and fully functioning system in perpetuity while conserving unique natural and cultural resources and maintaining opportunities for compatible scientific research, cultural, social, and recreational activities."

==== Administration ====
Routine monthly meetings and coordinated planning are essential to managing the CPNA. The CPNA's administrative partners work together to make decisions about the area and what needs to be addressed to maintain the plain's natural environment. Although each partner has its own headquarters and administrative personnel, the Education Center Coordinator is a position funded by all CPNA partners. At BLM, the staff consists of a project manager, a biological technician, a heavy equipment operator, a computer specialist, and a law enforcement ranger. All TNC personnel are based at their San Francisco office. DFG currently has only one wildlife biologist at CPNA, along with a wildlife assistant II and a scientific aide. Outside specialists also volunteer their time to study the area, from plant ecologists to species specialists. The fire suppression administration is the responsibility of BLM, which has formal agreements with Kern, Santa Barbara, and San Luis Obispo counties to help share in the support and funding of its fire suppression program. Funding for other programs within Carrizo Plain National Monument comes from its management partners.

==== Research ====
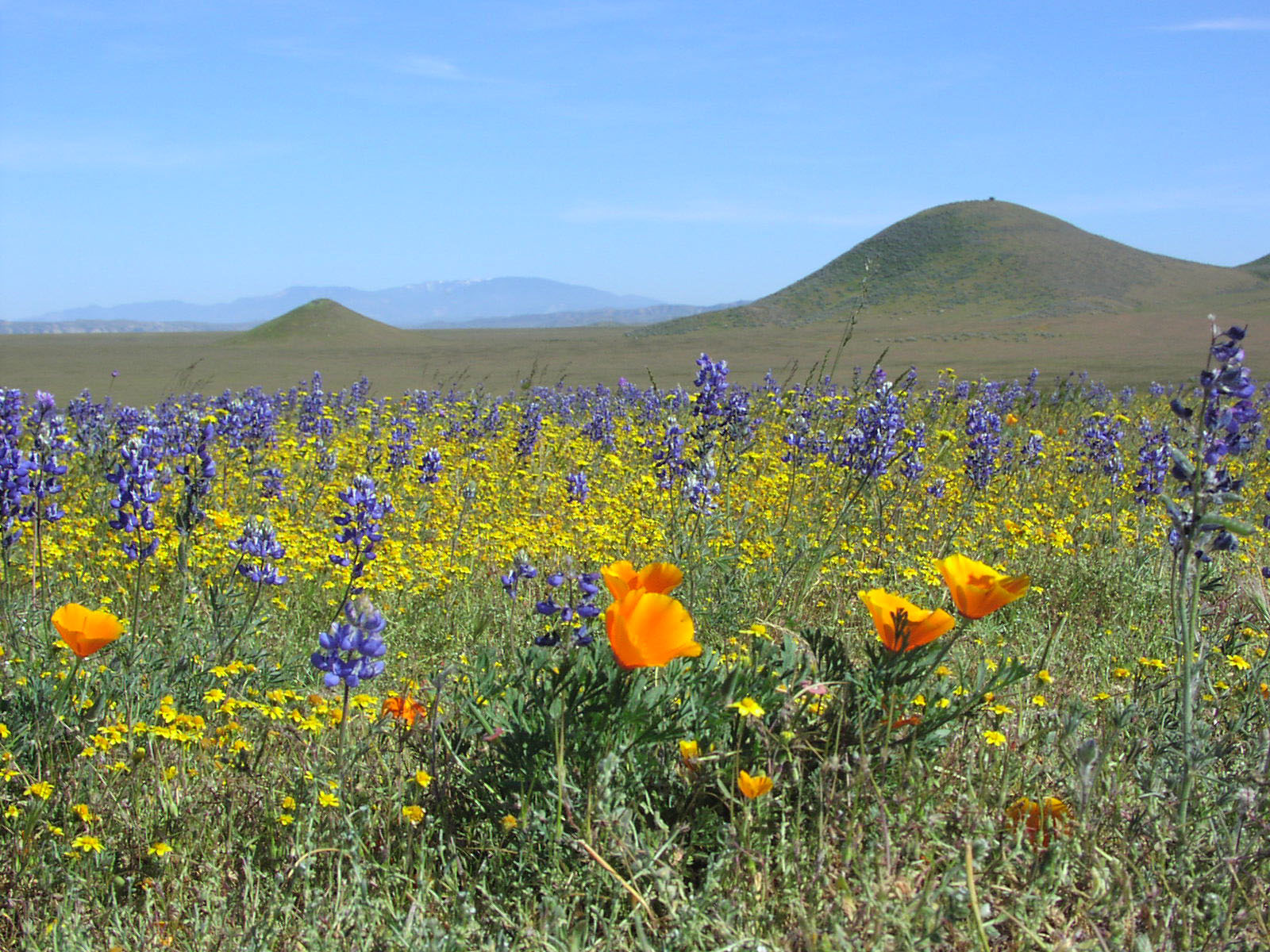
Poppies, lupine, and monolopia.

When the CPNA Plan was implemented in the late 1990s, one of its first assignments was to gather information on the area's biological, cultural, recreational, and physical resources. The information obtained by the management partners has helped ensure that each decision made on behalf of the Carrizo Plain National Monument benefits all of its resources. This research has also helped to manage different activities and events within the plain. For example, plant community restoration appears to be a tool that could benefit the entire region by promoting native species diversity, reestablishing natural biological processes, and protecting endangered species habitats.

==== Current management projects ====
One of the current range management projects involves removing non-native grasses through selective cattle grazing early in the season, when they emerge. Later in the season, the management team removes the cattle, giving native plants a competitive advantage over the non-native vegetation. The use of grazing on the Carrizo Plain National Monument remains a controversial practice.

==== Future management projects ====
There are abundant minerals in the Carrizo Plain National Monument. Gypsum, a white mineral used in plasters and wallboards, is a plentiful resource in the plain found in shallow, low-grade areas. In addition, there are detectable amounts of uranium and phosphates. All of these minerals are low-grade, making them unprofitable to reclaim and process.

=== Camping ===
==== Campgrounds ====
Camping in the monument is at two primitive campgrounds, KCL and Selby, both first come, first served and without charge.

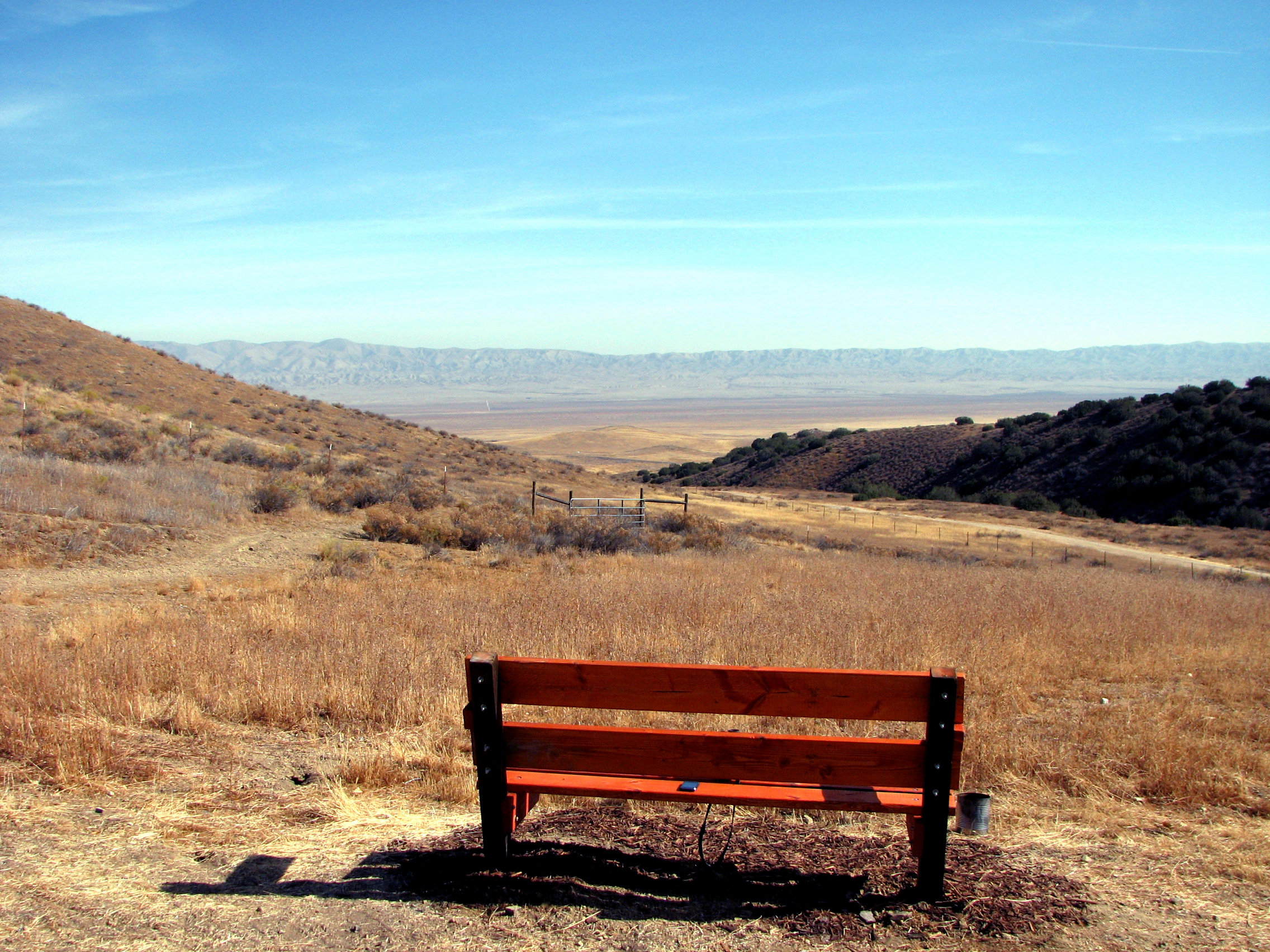
Mano Seca Bench at Selby Campground

KCL lies in the southern part of the monument, half a mile off Soda Lake Road along KCL Campground Road, on a site formerly held by the Kern County Land Company. It has twelve campsites, three of them with raised tent pads, an accessible vault toilet, picnic tables and fire rings, and some of the few shade trees on the valley floor. There is no electricity, drinking water may not be available, and there is no refuse collection.

Selby is further north, reached by 4.5 miles of road from Soda Lake Road, and is the more secluded of the two. It has thirteen campsites with picnic tables and fire pits, horse corrals, and a wheelchair accessible vault toilet; electricity and drinking water are not available and there is no refuse collection.

==== Primitive camping ====
Car camping is also an option within certain areas within the monument, primarily in the foothills. Camping is not allowed on the main valley floor. See the CPNM Visitor Resource Map.

== Conservation management issues ==
=== World Heritage Site ===
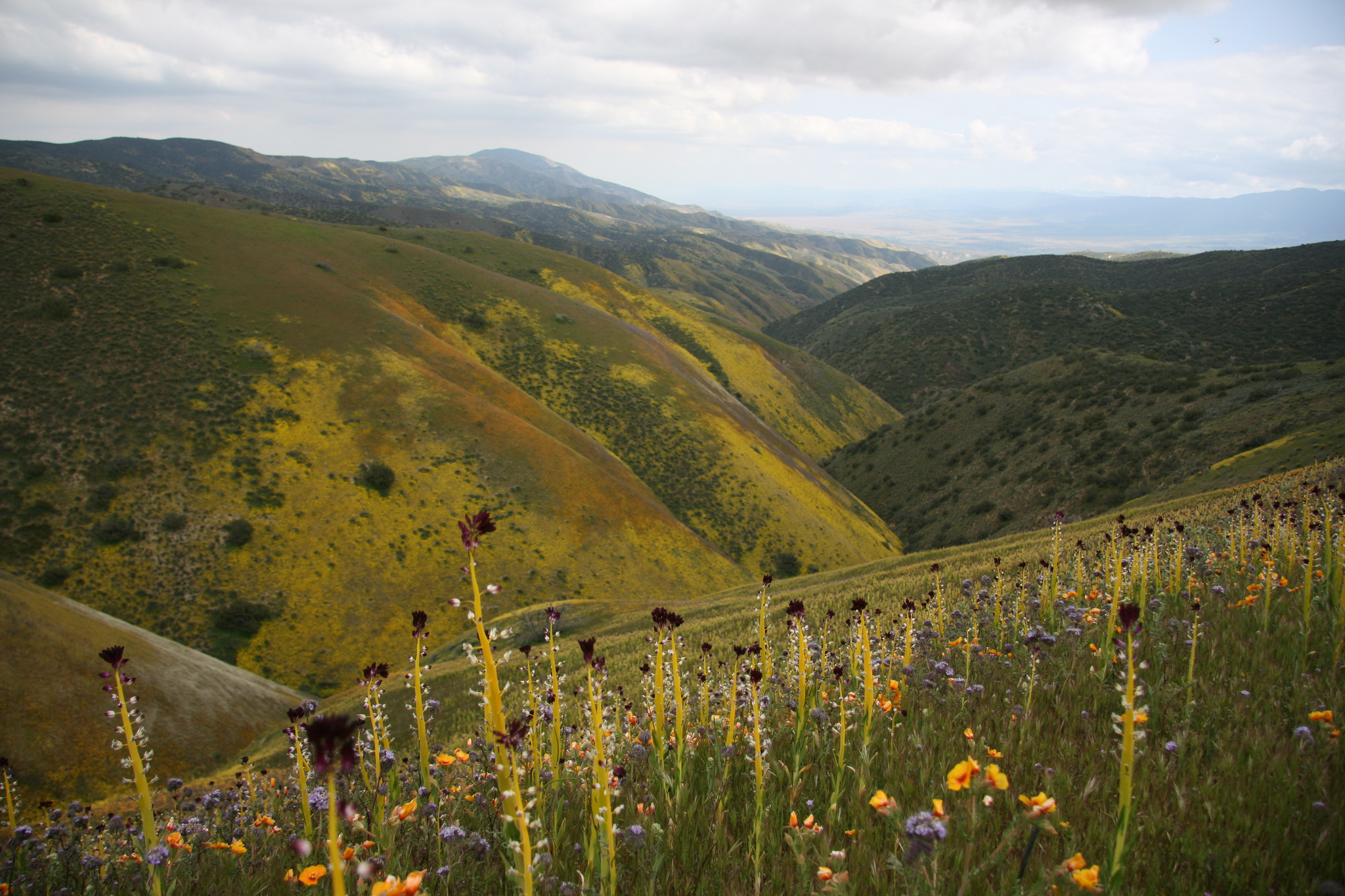
Wildflowers in the Carrizo, 2015

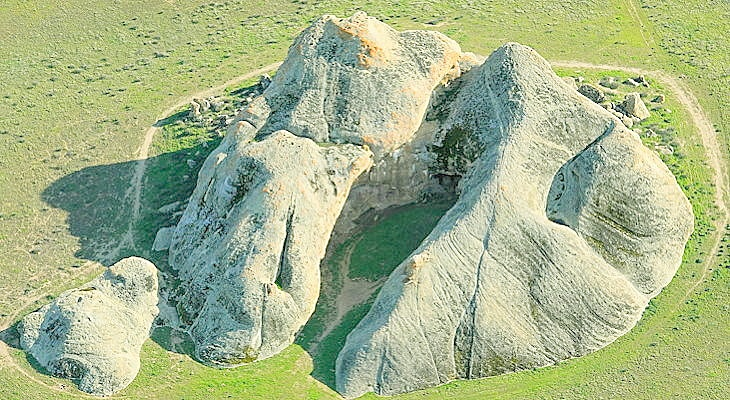
Painted Rock in Carrizo Plain

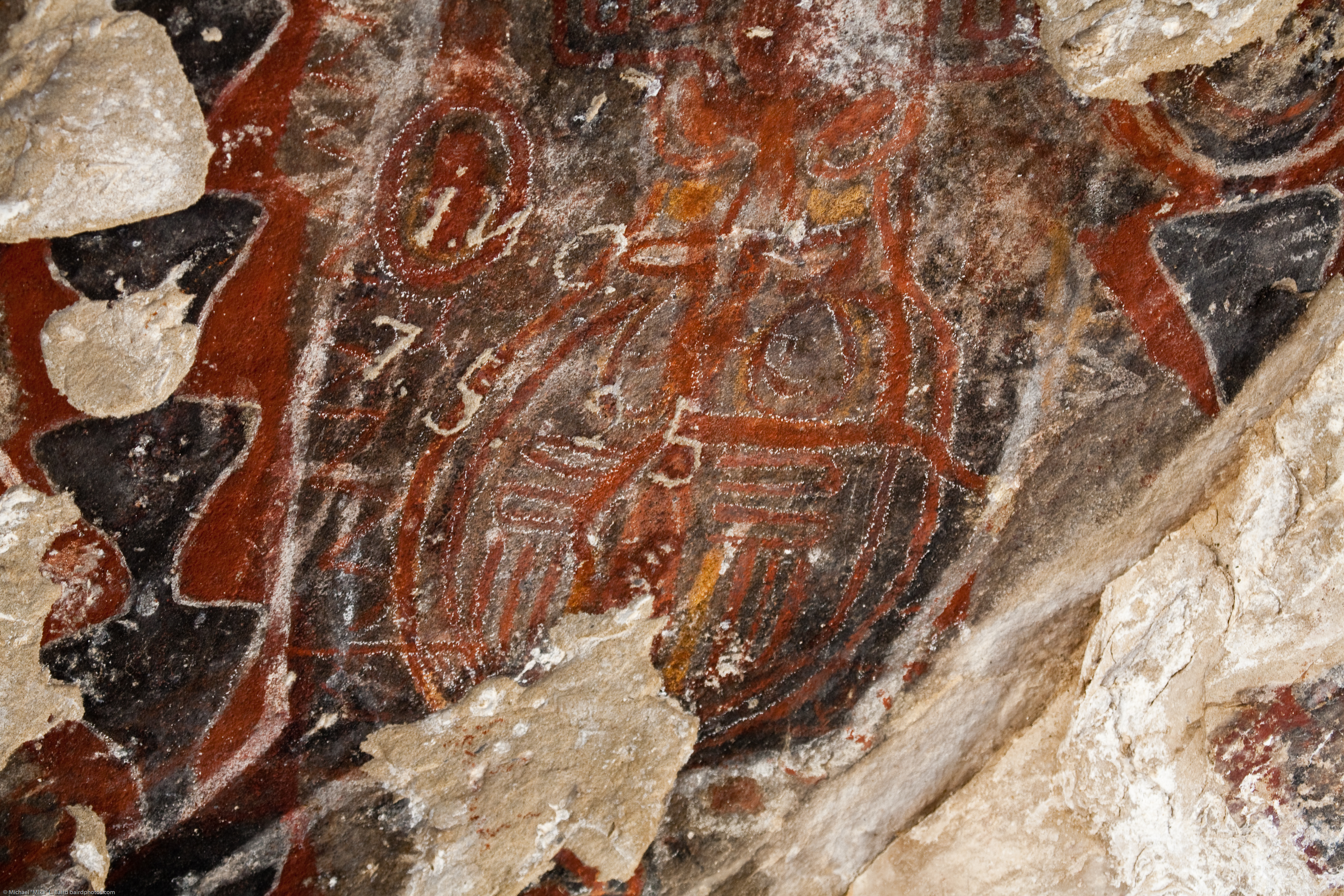
Pictographs at Painted Rock, CPNM

The Wilderness Society considered the Carrizo Plain as a nominee for World Heritage Site status. Only two other locations in California – Redwood National Park and Yosemite National Park – have received this status. This idea was greatly opposed by The Independent Petroleum Association and the residents of the nearby city of Taft, while supporters of the nomination included the City of San Luis Obispo, the San Luis Obispo Chamber of Commerce, and the San Luis Obispo Chapter of the League of Women Voters.

Advantages of World Heritage Site status for the Carrizo Plain might have included increased tourism for the plain and surrounding areas, greater ability to attract private and public funding for habitat conservation and sustainable tourism, and increased management support. However, opponents of the nomination were concerned that World Heritage Site status would create problems for oil production, grazing rights, off-road recreation, and private property rights. One point of controversy was a buffer zone around the monument; opponents expected that this would adversely affect nearby oil drilling sites. Some residents were also fearful of international organizations that would monitor and report on the monument's compliance with World Heritage treaty obligations, because maintenance of World Heritage status would depend on compliance with the 1972 Convention Concerning the Protection of World Cultural and Natural Heritage, ratified by the United States. The widespread belief was that the United States would lose sovereignty over the area.

The Wilderness Society ultimately decided not to nominate the Carrizo Plain National Monument for World Heritage Site designation, as nominations require near-unanimous support.

=== Oil drilling ===
While the Carrizo Plain is dotted with dry holes drilled and abandoned by oil companies in decades past, no commercially viable quantities of petroleum have ever been found on the plain itself. Small amounts of drillable oil have been found south of the Caliente Range, near the Russell Ranch Oil Field, and in the northeast part of the Temblors, abutting the giant McKittrick and Cymric fields. As the plain is adjacent to the super-giant oil fields of Kern County – the Midway-Sunset Oil Field, third largest in the United States, is on the other side of the Temblor Range – the Carrizo Plain has long been considered to have at least a moderate potential for oil development. As it is separated from the major oil fields by the San Andreas Fault, and the underlying source rock, the Monterey Formation appears not to have been buried at the right conditions of temperature and pressure. Because the stratigraphy has not favored petroleum entrapment, oil accumulations of economically recoverable quantities have not been found. Vintage Production, a subsidiary of Occidental Petroleum, owned the mineral rights to 30,000 of the monument's 250,000 acres (101,000 ha). When oil prices spiked in 2007, Vintage notified the U.S. Bureau of Land Management (BLM) of its intentions to find out if oil is contained in the Carrizo Plain. The mineral rights owned by Vintage pre-existed the monument's creation by President Bill Clinton in 2001. The BLM approved an oil well and pipeline project in the Russell Ranch Oil Field within the monument in 2018, but withdrew it after Los Padres ForestWatch and the Center for Biological Diversity filed objections citing the potential for oil spills, air pollution and harm to wildlife, among other environmental concerns. The BLM approved the project in 2020 after its analysis showed that the new well posed no undue health or safety concerns, had no significant environmental impacts, and was consistent with management directives for the monument. An agreement was reached in 2022 over a lawsuit against the BLM filed by the conservation groups in 2020. The BLM issued an order to E&B Natural Resources to permanently close and remove 11 long-dormant oil wells, return the oil pads and more than 3 miles (4.8 km) of access roads to natural conditions, as well as removing pipelines, powerlines and other infrastructure from within the monument.

=== Solar power ===
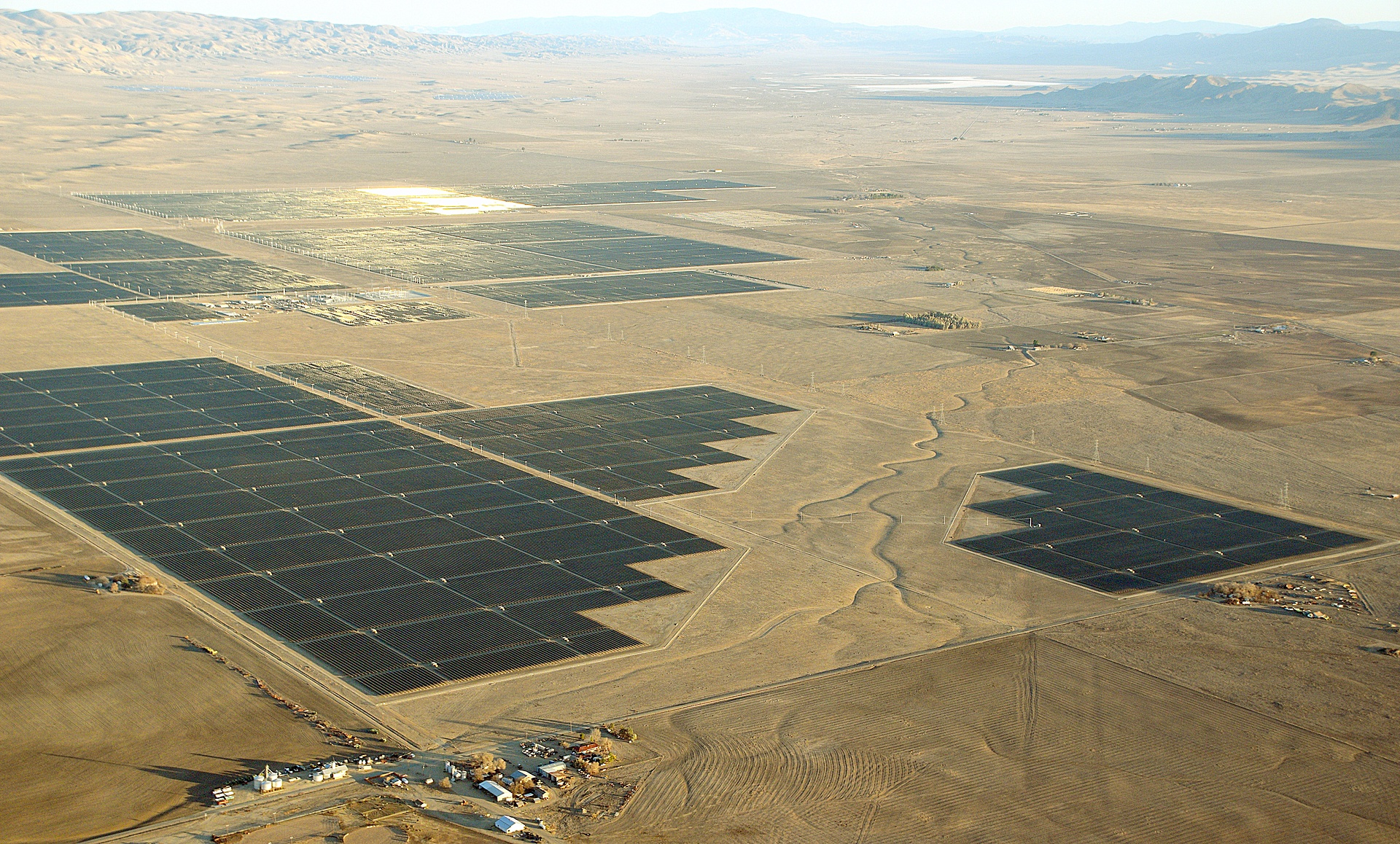
Aerial view of Carrizo Plain solar farm 2017

The remote Carrizo Plain's status as one of the sunniest places in the state was exploited by the solar power industry from 1983 to 1994. This was by far the largest photovoltaic array in the world, with 100,000 of the 1-by-4-foot (0.3 by 1.2 m) photovoltaic arrays producing 5.2 megawatts at its peak. The plant was originally constructed by the Atlantic Richfield oil company (ARCO) in 1983. During the 1979 energy crisis, ARCO became a solar energy pioneer, manufacturing its own photovoltaic arrays. ARCO first built a 1-megawatt pilot operation, the Lugo plant in Hesperia, California, which is now closed. The Carrizo Solar Corporation, based in Albuquerque, New Mexico, bought the two facilities from ARCO in 1990. Still, oil prices never rose as predicted, so the solar plant never became competitive with fossil-fuel-based energy production. Carrizo Solar sold its electricity to the local utility for between 3 and 4 cents per kilowatt-hour. In comparison, a minimum price of 8 to 10 cents per kilowatt-hour would have been necessary for Carrizo to break even. Another photovoltaic facility was planned for the site by the Chatsworth Utility Power Group, with an output of 100 megawatts; it would have been many times larger than the existing facility, but it never progressed beyond the drawing board. The Carrizo Solar Company dismantled its 177-acre (0.7 km^{2}) facility in the late 1990s, and the used solar panels are still being resold worldwide.

In October 2007, the Palo Alto company Ausra, doing business as Carrizo Energy, filed an application for a 177 MW (peak) Carrizo Energy Solar Farm (CESF) on 640 acres (2.6 km^{2}) adjacent to the previous ARCO site. Instead of photovoltaic cells (as used by ARCO), however, Ausra will use Fresnel reflectors that concentrate solar energy onto pipes in a receiver elevated above the ground. Concentrated solar energy boils water in a row of specially coated stainless steel pipes within an insulated cavity, producing saturated steam. The steam produced in the receivers is collected in a series of pipes, routed to steam drums, and then to the two turbine generators. Steam from the steam turbines is condensed to liquid water and then returned to the solar field. Electricity from the steam generators will be used in San Luis Obispo county. Local opposition to some solar farm proposals centers on concerns about height above grade, noise and heat plume.

The solar field would have operated daily from sunrise to sunset. Typical operating hours for the CESF would have been approximately 13 hours per day, totaling 4,765 hours per year. In November 2009, the project was canceled.

On August 14, 2008, Pacific Gas and Electric Company announced agreements to buy the power from two proposed photovoltaic plants in the Carrizo Plain, Topaz Solar Farm and High Plains Ranch, with a combined peak power of 800 MW. If built, these will be the world's largest photovoltaic plants.

As of November 2014 Topaz Solar Farm is operational, with peak power of 550 MW.

California Valley Solar Ranch opened in 2013.

=== Grazing ===
Few issues regarding the CPNM have been as controversial as grazing. The internal dispute in the Bureau of Land Management created national headlines when Marlene Braun, the first Monument Manager of the CPNM, died by suicide in 2005. An investigative article by Los Angeles Times reporters Julie Cart and Maria LaGanga revealed that Braun discussed grazing extensively in correspondence just before her death. The proclamation for the Carrizo Plain National Monument addressed grazing, but its language is similar to that of other proclamations. The proclamation directed BLM to manage grazing in accordance with existing laws and regulations. Braun chose to allow Taylor Grazing Act allotments to expire and replace them with free-use permits. This action was opposed by many ranchers and Braun's field office supervisor, Ron Huntsinger. Her practice, which would allow BLM to set stocking rates each season rather than guarantee them for 10-year periods, was contrary to the Department of the Interior's desires under President George W. Bush. Bakersfield District Office Manager Ron Huntsinger was brought in to oversee a continuation of the Taylor Grazing Act permit system. Braun and Huntsinger clashed repeatedly, and Braun faced the prospect of stiff penalties for insubordination at the time of her death. The LA Times, in a follow-up article by Julie Cart, said, "What began as a policy dispute – to graze or not to graze livestock on the fragile Carrizo grasslands – became a morass of environmental politics and office feuding that Braun was convinced threatened both her future and the landscape she loved." The monument manager's suicide brought "into stark focus the difficulty BLM managers had in trying to balance the demands of providing protection in accordance with the proclamations and balancing the multiple use mandate of FLPMA."

== See also ==
- List of national monuments of the United States
- List of National Historic Landmarks in California
- National Register of Historic Places listings in San Luis Obispo County, California
