= Puerto Errado =

Solar thermal power plant

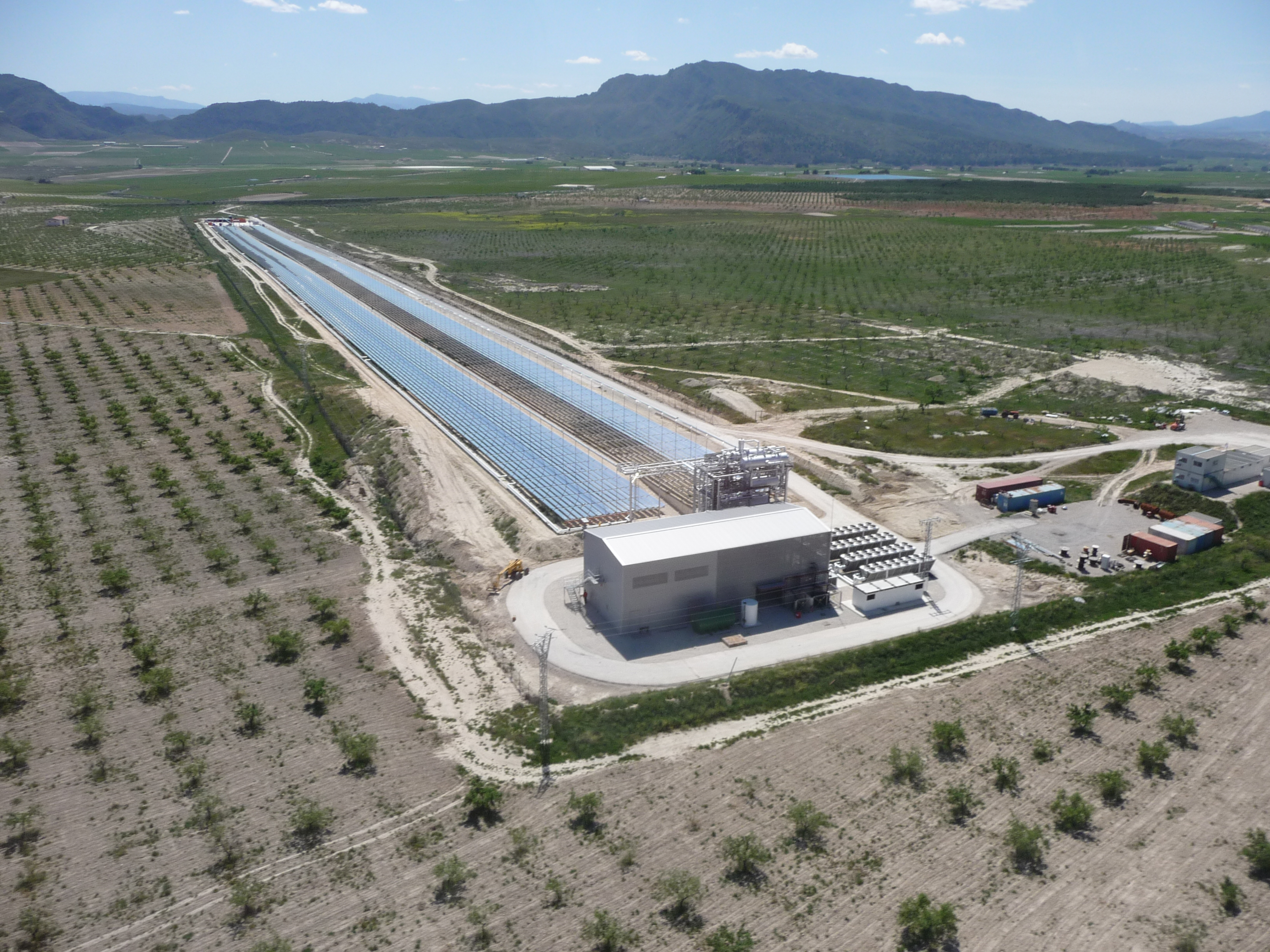
- Country: Spain
- Location: Calasparra, Region of Murcia
- Coordinates: 38°16′42″N 1°36′01″W
- Status: Operational
- Commission date: March 2009, March 31, 2012

Solar farm
- Type: CSP
- CSP technology: Fresnel reflector
- Site resource: 2,095 kWh/m^{2}/yr
- Site area: 75 hectares (185 acres)

Power generation
- Units operational: 2
- Make and model: Siemens SST-120
- Nameplate capacity: 31.4 MW
- Annual net output: 51 GWh

Puerto Errado is a linear fresnel reflector solar thermal power plant, located in the Region of Murcia of Spain. Puerto Errado 1 is 1.4 megawatts (MW), and was the first Fresnel-reflector, solar power plant connected to the grid, in March 2009. It covers an area of 5 hectares (12 acres). Puerto Errado 2 added 30 MW in February, 2012. It covers an area of 70 hectares (173 acres) with 28 rows of mirrors, and has an aperture area of 302,000 square metres (3,250,700 sq ft). Power is being sold for 26.8717 Euro cents per kWh for the first 25 years and 21.5495 Euro cents/kWh thereafter.

Puerto Errado 2 covers a mirror surface of 302,000 m^{2} and is the world's largest Fresnel power plant in operation. The German company Novatec Solar has provided the Fresnel technology, and five Swiss utilities, EBL and IWB of Basel, EKZ and EWZ of Zurich, as well as EWB of Bern, are the owners of the plant.

== See also ==
- List of solar thermal power stations
- Renewable energy in the European Union
- Solar power in Spain
- Solar thermal energy
- Wind power in Spain
