= Panoche Valley Solar Farm =

Photovoltaic power station in California, United States

- Country: United States
- Location: Panoche Valley, San Benito County
- Coordinates: 36.62°N 120.87°W
- Status: Operational
- Construction began: April 2016
- Commission date: January 2018
- Construction cost: approximately $1 billion
- Owners: Panoche Valley Solar, LLC.

Solar farm
- Type: Flat-panel PV
- Site area: 1,300 acres (530 ha)

Power generation
- Nameplate capacity: 130 MW

Panoche Valley Solar Farm is a 130 megawatt (MW), utility-scale solar photovoltaic power station in the Panoche Valley of Central California's San Benito County. Panoche Valley is crossed by a 230-kilovolt (kV) power line from the Moss Landing Power Plant.

Originally proposed by Solargen Energy (later known as Nevo Energy), the project was purchased by PV2 Energy in April 2011, with Nevo Energy retaining a small equity interest, but no voting, governance or management input. In April 2012, PV2 Energy entered into a joint venture with Duke Energy, the largest utility in the United States. The project was eventually acquired by Con Edison in 2016.

The project site consists of 4,717 acres (1,909 ha) of private land in the northern portion of the valley. It is used for pasture-based livestock grazing on native grassland habitat. In October 2010, the San Benito County Board of Supervisors approved the company’s environmental impact report. Originally proposed at 399 MW, the cost was estimated at approximately $1 billion. The project faced lawsuits from three environmental groups who charged that project would harm native species such as the giant kangaroo rat, blunt-nosed leopard lizard, San Joaquin kit fox, and various bird species. The project was downsized to 247 MW and eventually 130 MW in 2017 after a settlement was reached. The plant started producing power in January 2018. RWE acquired Con Edison's clean energy business in 2023.

== Electricity production ==
Generation (MW·h) of Panoche Valley Solar Farm
Year	Jan	Feb	Mar	Apr	May	Jun	Jul	Aug	Sep	Oct	Nov	Dec	Total
2018	7,127	12,526	12,779	17,446	20,209	20,271	20,588	19,533	23,132	24,024	18,216	16,554	212,405
2019	16,691	19,603	28,963	37,719	38,348	46,276	48,133	44,190	37,025	30,878	20,290	13,722	381,838
2020	16,912	25,900	20,287	18,395	29,662	39,296	47,470	37,455	27,922	24,917	18,611	18,450	325,277
2021	17,437	19,453	29,067	38,078	38,940	42,968	44,627	38,897	32,902	18,941	21,484	13,202	355,996
2022	19,808	25,597	26,116	15,420	22,128	37,233	41,289	39,405	28,850	25,565	21,014	14,306	316,731
2023	15,815	17,910	15,158	9,299	30,367	32,563	45,430	38,736	32,097	45,248	18,624	14,692	315,939
2024	15,110	10,508	8,079	13,098	20,698	35,433	44,666	40,026	31,714	24,848	18,996	15,916	279,092
Average Annual Production (2018-2024)													312,468

== See also ==
- California Valley Solar Ranch
