= Kimberlina Solar Thermal Energy Plant =

Power plant in California, United States

Coordinates: 35°34′06″N 119°12′06″W

The 5 megawatt (MW) Kimberlina Solar Thermal Energy Plant in Bakersfield, California is the first commercial solar thermal power plant to be built by Areva Solar. Completed in 2008, the Kimberlina renewable energy solar boiler uses Compact Linear Fresnel Reflector (CLFR) technology to generate superheated steam. Each solar boiler has a group of 13 narrow, flat mirrors, that individually track and focus the sun's heat onto overhead pipes carrying water. The water boils directly into steam. The steam can then spin a turbine to generate electricity or be used as industrial steam for food, oil and desalination processes. The Kimberlina solar boiler currently achieves 750-degree F superheated steam. The next generation solar boiler under construction is designed to achieve 900-degree F superheated steam.

AREVA Solar's boiler is the first and only solar boiler certified with an S-Stamp by the American Society of Mechanical Engineers (ASME).

The Kimberlina Solar Thermal Energy Plant was the first of its kind to be built in California in more than 20 years, with the previous plant being the Solar Energy Generating Systems, which employs solar troughs.

== See also ==
- List of concentrating solar thermal power companies
- List of photovoltaic power stations
- List of solar thermal power stations
- Renewable energy in the United States
- Renewable portfolio standard
- Solar power in the United States
- Solar power plants in the Mojave Desert
