= Desert Sunlight Solar Farm =

Photovoltaic power station in California

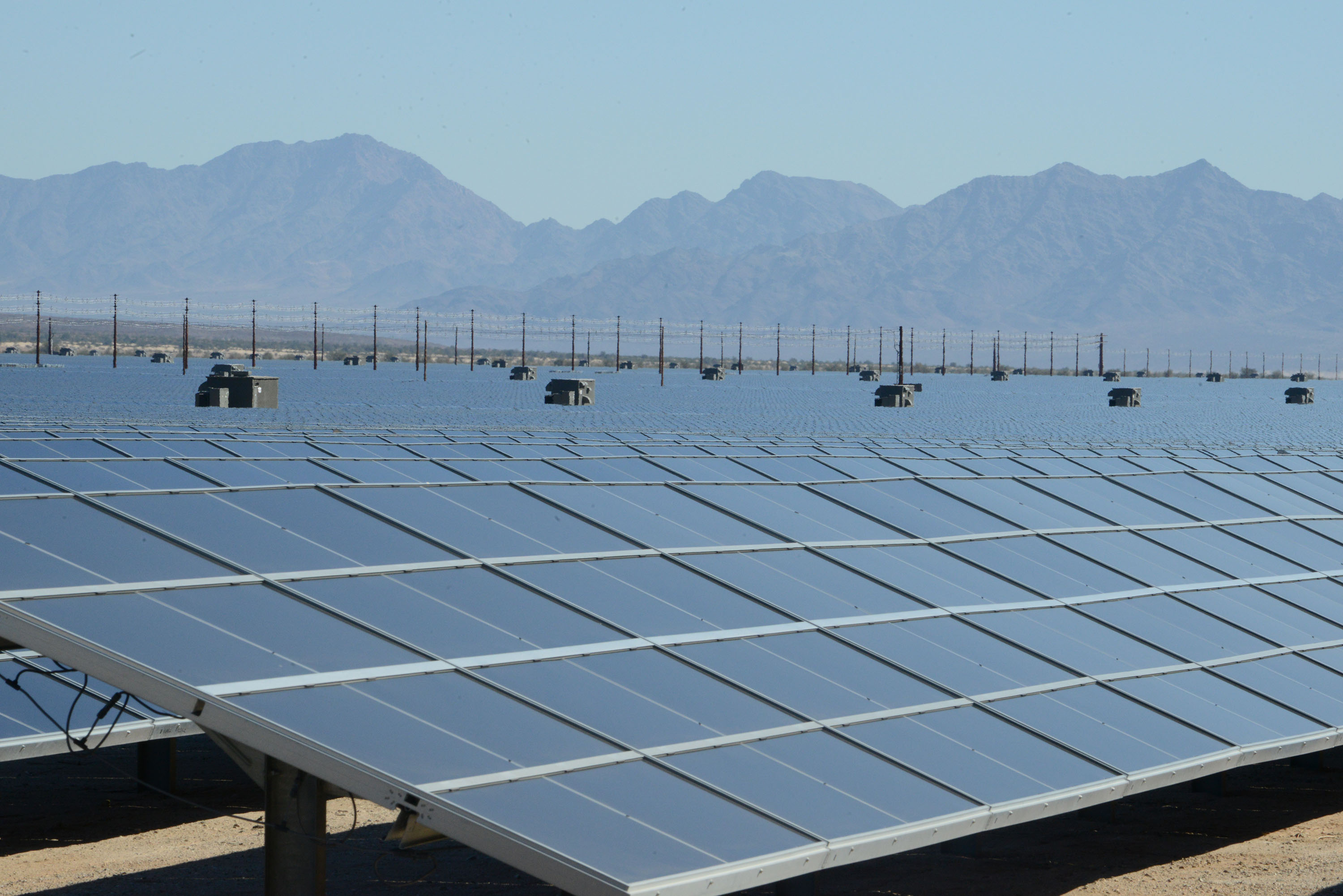
- Solar arrays at Desert Sunlight
- Country: United States
- Location: Riverside County, California
- Coordinates: 33°49′17″N 115°23′38″W
- Status: Operational
- Construction began: 2011
- Commission date: 2015
- Owners: NextEra Energy Resources, Clearway Energy, CalPERS

Solar farm
- Type: Flat-panel PV fixed tilt
- Site area: 3,900 acres (1,600 ha)

Power generation
- Nameplate capacity: 550 MW_{AC}
- Capacity factor: 27.5% (average 2015-2018)
- Annual net output: 1,325 GW·h, 340 MW·h/acre (462.4 MW·h/hectare)

External links
- Website: firstsolar.com

The Desert Sunlight Solar Farm is a 550-megawatt (MW_{AC}) fixed-tilt photovoltaic power station approximately 6 miles (9.7 km) north of Desert Center, California, United States, in the Mojave Desert. It was made by the US thin-film manufacturer First Solar but now has split ownership between NextEra Energy Resources, Clearway Energy, and California Public Employee's Retirement System (CalPERS). It has the same 550 MW installed capacity as the Topaz Solar Farm in the Carrizo Plain region of Central California, making both of them tied for the second largest completed solar plants by installed capacity as of fall 2015.

== Project details ==
The project was built on over 6 square miles (16 km^{2}) of creosote bush-dominated desert habitat near Desert Center next to Joshua Tree National Park. Construction began in September 2011 and final completion was in January 2015.

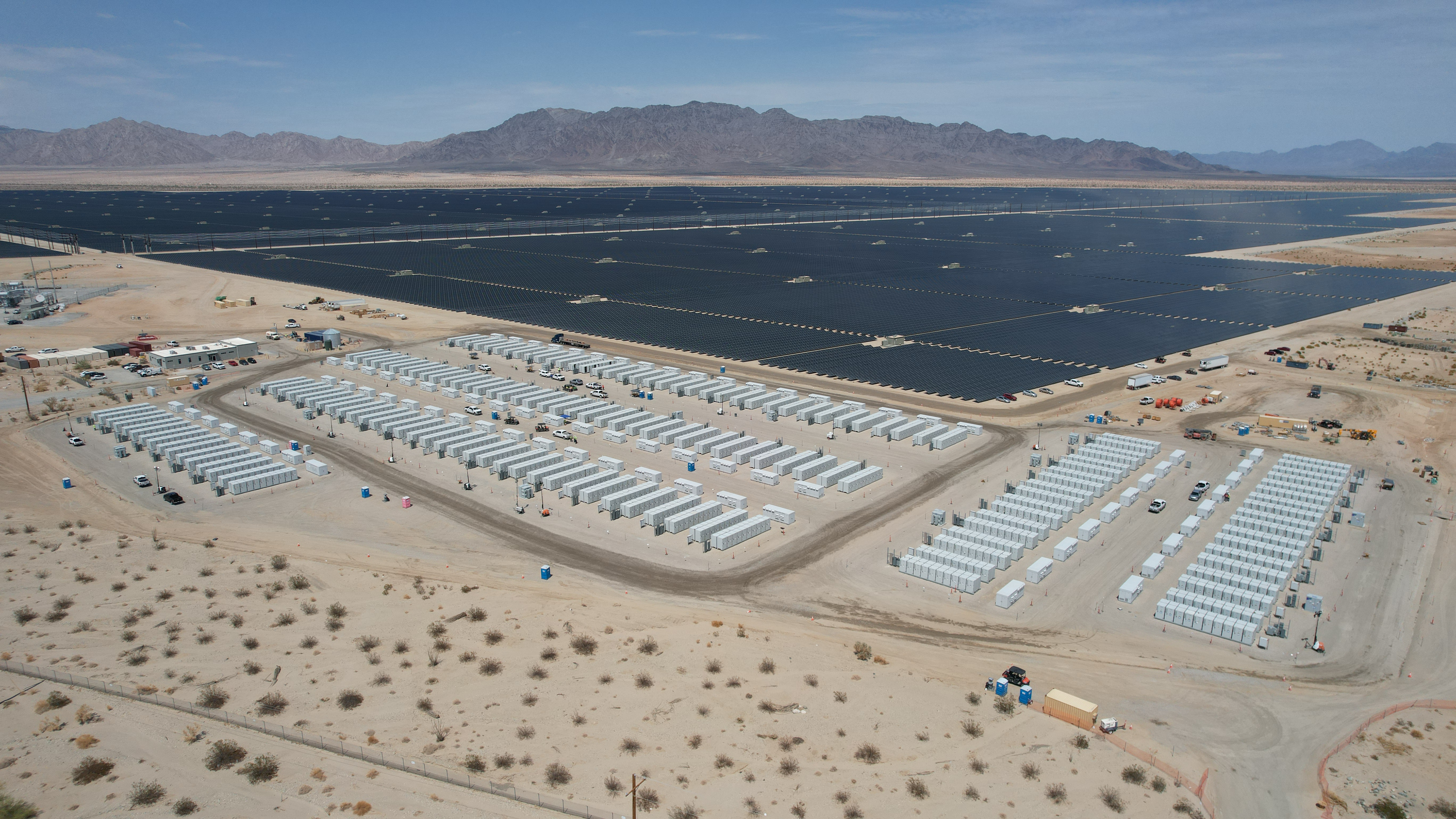
The battery storage station was completed in 2022

The Desert Sunlight Solar Farm was expanded with battery energy storage systems (BESS) in 2022 and 2024. Desert Sunlight Battery Energy Storage System, also known as Sunlight Storage I, was the first phase of BESS that added 230 MW of 4-hour storage to the facility and became operational in 2022. Sunlight Storage II added an additional 300 MW of 4-hour storage the facility and became operational in 2024. The combined total of the two storage facilities is 530 MW of 4-hour storage, or 2,120 MWh. Both storage facilities were built within the fence line of the original solar facility and therefore caused minimal new environmental impacts.

== Electricity production ==
Total Facility Generation (Annual Sum from Both Units Below)
Year	Total Annual MW·h
2013	104,301
2014	1,020,905
2015	1,286,763
2016	1,346,282
2017	1,321,129
2018	1,344,841
Average (2015–2018)	1,324,754

Generation (MW·h) of Desert Sunlight 250, LLC
Year	Jan	Feb	Mar	Apr	May	Jun	Jul	Aug	Sep	Oct	Nov	Dec	Total
2013											12,877	15,657	28,534
2014	21,773	27,207	34,901	41,461	39,400	43,829	51,572	39,497	46,360	46,364	46,793	34,333	473,490
2015	40,399	47,894	56,371	59,569	60,775	57,715	58,348	58,787	39,097	47,562	45,791	41,633	613,941
2016	39,151	50,933	55,135	54,198	63,118	59,008	61,051	57,526	53,062	50,947	43,476	36,137	623,742
2017	25,225	28,175	52,539	55,354	69,598	75,424	68,750	63,536	59,329	54,655	33,586	32,031	618,201
2018	28,722	40,501	46,310	57,894	69,784	75,188	64,990	65,442	61,950	48,809	33,573	26,709	619,921

Generation (MW·h) of Desert Sunlight 300, LLC
Year	Jan	Feb	Mar	Apr	May	Jun	Jul	Aug	Sep	Oct	Nov	Dec	Total
2013								10,015			32,709	33,043	75,767
2014	32,312	34,615	44,998	45,876	43,733	47,205	45,698	44,642	66,531	51,571	52,960	37,274	547,415
2015	45,802	52,966	60,742	64,541	61,367	63,147	63,620	63,517	44,398	53,467	51,543	47,712	672,822
2016	44,903	58,492	61,875	60,223	74,220	70,241	72,661	67,907	61,623	58,041	50,542	41,812	722,540
2017	28,682	32,036	59,740	62,940	79,137	85,761	78,172	72,243	67,460	62,146	38,189	36,421	702,928
2018	33,645	47,361	54,154	67,699	81,604	87,922	75,998	76,527	72,443	57,076	39,259	31,232	724,920

== See also ==
- Solar power in the Mojave Desert
- Topaz Solar Farm
- Photovoltaics
- List of photovoltaic power stations
