= California Valley Solar Ranch =

Photovoltaic power plant in California, US

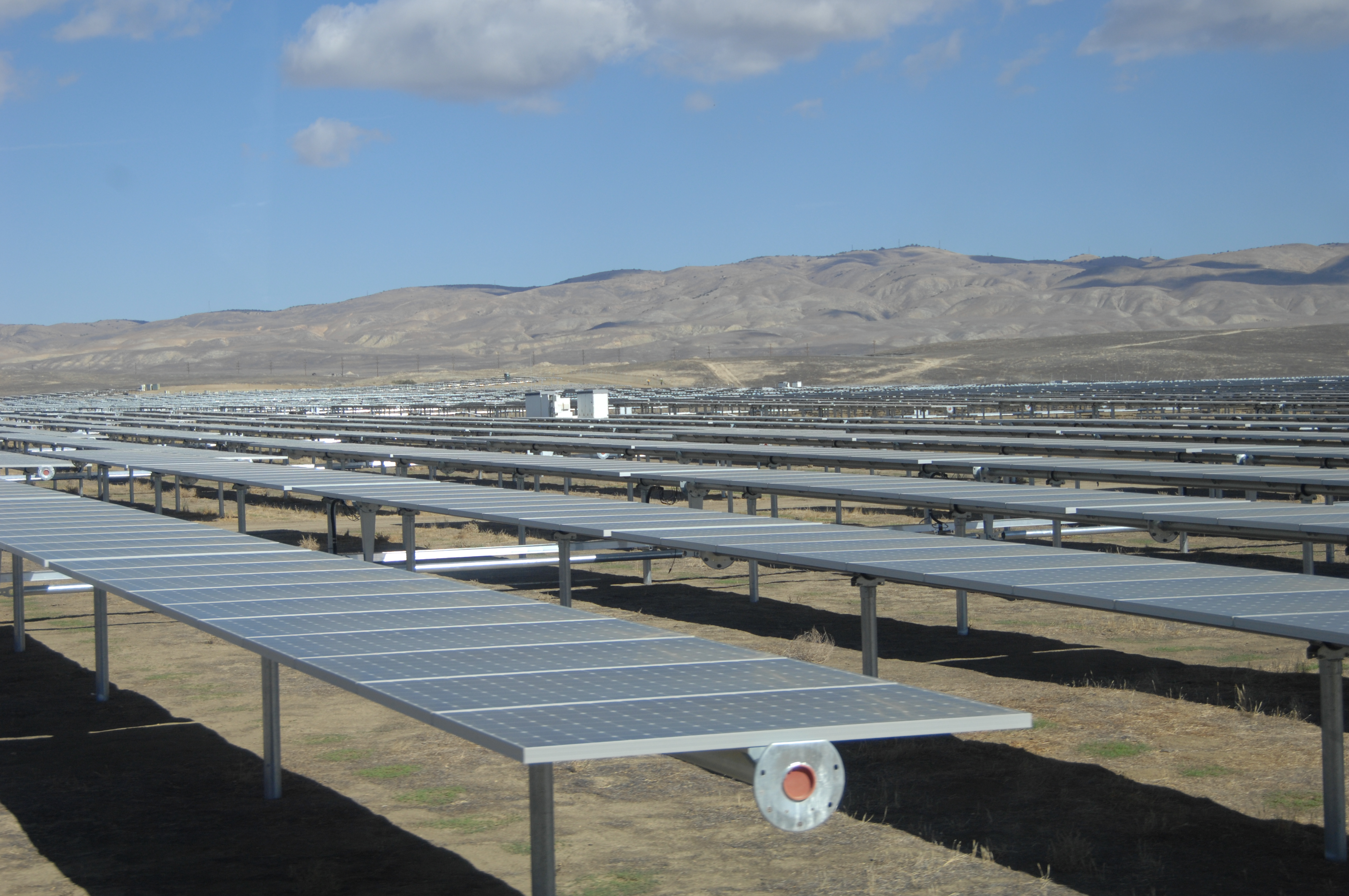
- California Valley Solar Ranch solar panels
- Country: United States
- Location: Carrizo Plain, northeast of California Valley, CA
- Coordinates: 35°19′48″N 119°54′36″W
- Status: Operational
- Construction began: 2011
- Commission date: October 2013
- Construction cost: $1.6 billion (2015) ($2.06 billion in 2024 dollars)
- Owner: NRG Solar
- Operator: SunPower

Solar farm
- Type: Flat-panel PV
- Site area: 1,966 acres (796 ha)

Power generation
- Nameplate capacity: 250 MW_{AC}
- Capacity factor: 30.8% (average 2014-2017)
- Annual net output: 675 GW·h, 340 MW·h/acre

External links
- Website: www.californiavalleysolarranch.com
- Commons: Related media on Commons

The California Valley Solar Ranch (CVSR) is a 250 megawatt (MW_{AC}) photovoltaic power plant in the Carrizo Plain, northeast of California Valley. The project is owned by NRG Energy, and SunPower is the EPC contractor and technology provider. The project constructed on 1,966 acres (796 ha) of a 4,365-acre (1,766 ha) site of former grazing land. It is utilizing high-efficiency, crystalline PV panels designed and manufactured by SunPower. The project includes up to 88,000 SunPower solar tracking devices to hold PV panels that track the sun across the sky.

== Project overview ==
The project began construction in 2011, and began operation in 2012 with 22 MW completed. It was fully completed in October 2013. At the time it was completed, "the California Valley Solar Ranch will power about 100,000 homes and will be one of the largest photovoltaic (PV) solar power plants in the world".

The project is being constructed on 1,966 acres (796 ha) of a 4,365-acre (1,766 ha) site of former grazing land. It is utilizing high-efficiency, crystalline PV panels designed and manufactured by SunPower. The project includes up to 88,000 SunPower solar tracking devices to hold PV panels that track the sun across the sky. The project delivers approximately 550 gigawatt-hours (GW·h) annually of renewable energy and has a capacity of 250 MW. While the plant only has a capacity factor of 25%, its power is generated during the middle of the day, when demand for electricity — and price — is much higher than at night.

== Power purchase agreement ==
On August 14, 2008, Pacific Gas and Electric announced an agreement to buy all the power from the power plant. A Conditional Use Permit application for the project was filed with the County of San Luis Obispo Planning and Building Department on January 14, 2009. On November 30, 2010, NRG Energy announced that it would buy CVSR from SunPower for "up to $450 million". In September 2011, the Department of Energy (DOE) offered NRG Solar a $1.237 billion loan from the federal government to cover most of the construction cost. The total cost of the project is estimated to be $1.6 billion.

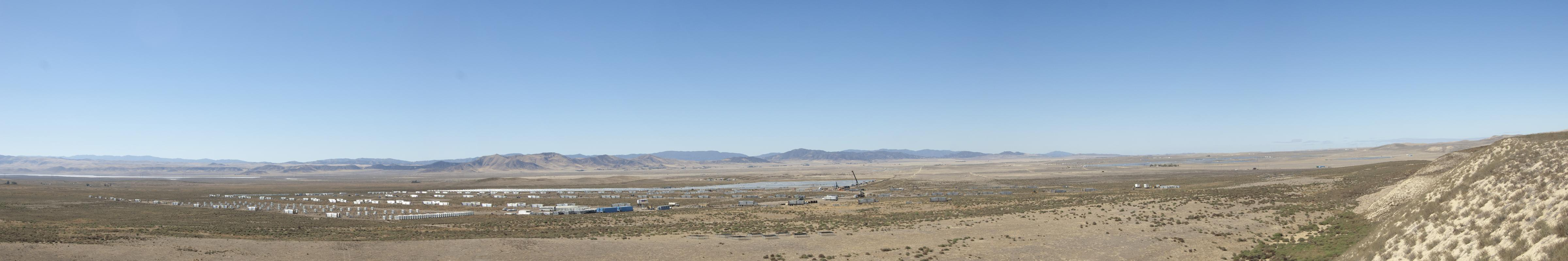
Panoramic view of construction, October 2012

== Environment ==
The Carrizo Plain is home to 13 species listed as endangered either by the state or federal government, including the San Joaquin kit fox, giant kangaroo rat, and the California condor. SunPower worked with the community to protect local wildlife habitat and migration patterns, and reduced the amount of traffic in the area during construction. In 2012, it was reported that SunPower and First Solar had designed a plan to create a 19,000 acre reserve for the giant kangaroo rat, San Joaquin kit fox and golden eagle in order to address concerns about habitat destruction.

== Electricity production ==
Generation (MW·h) of California Valley Solar Ranch
Year	Jan	Feb	Mar	Apr	May	Jun	Jul	Aug	Sep	Oct	Nov	Dec	Total
2012									4,014	4,190	5,504	8,019	21,727
2013	15,824	20,631	24,304	28,133	10,533	25,459	31,131	51,646	63,073	56,747	37,300	34,583	399,364
2014	35,851	36,710	54,654	66,210	78,967	84,024	77,526	74,398	60,789	50,939	36,701	27,634	684,403
2015	36,087	43,208	60,175	67,920	70,492	77,665	75,705	75,695	60,536	48,796	40,421	31,553	688,253
2016	27,064	48,485	58,571	63,317	71,275	80,545	82,609	74,310	63,259	44,720	37,633	28,008	679,796
2017	25,685	28,689	53,629	57,222	72,972	79,042	71,978	66,590	62,052	57,168	35,337	37,178	647,541
Average annual production (2014–2017)													675,000

== Incidents ==
A fire removed 84% of the generating capacity from service in June 2019 when poles and cables were damaged by an "avian incident." Full service was expected to be restored within a month.

== See also ==
- DeSoto Next Generation Solar Energy Center
- Montalto di Castro Photovoltaic Power Station
- Panoche Valley Solar Farm
