= Carrizo Energy Solar Farm =

Planned solar thermal power plant in California

The Carrizo Energy Solar Farm was a proposed 177 megawatt (MW) solar thermal power plant, to be built by Ausra in California's Carrizo Plain, near Simmler. The location gets less sun than the Mojave Desert, where several other solar thermal plants are under consideration, but is near an existing transmission line from Diablo Canyon Power Plant, reducing the cost and time needed to construct the plant.

The $550 million power plant would have provided enough power for 60,000 homes, and Pacific Gas and Electric (PG&E) entered into a contract to buy all the power from the power plant. Ausra claimed its technology can deliver power at 10.4 cents per kilowatt-hour (¢/kW·h). Ausra planned to have the plant generating power by 2010, using Ausra's Compact Linear Fresnel Reflector (CLFR) solar technology.

In November 2009, Ausra announced that it had sold its options to the 640 acres (260 ha) of land to First Solar and canceled its contract with PG&E. First Solar will use some of the land for its Topaz Solar Farm.
