= Compact linear Fresnel reflector =

Optical device for concentrating light

A compact linear Fresnel reflector (CLFR) – also referred to as a concentrating linear Fresnel reflector – is a specific type of linear Fresnel reflector (LFR) technology. It is named for its similarity to a Fresnel lens, in which many small, thin lens fragments are combined to simulate a much thicker simple lens. These mirrors are capable of concentrating the sun's energy to approximately 30 times its normal intensity.

Linear Fresnel reflectors use long, thin segments of mirrors to focus sunlight onto a fixed absorber located at a common focal point of the reflectors. This concentrated energy is transferred through the absorber into some thermal fluid (this is typically oil capable of maintaining a liquid state at very high temperatures). The fluid then goes through a heat exchanger to power a steam generator. As opposed to traditional LFRs, the CLFR utilizes multiple absorbers within the vicinity of the mirrors.

== History ==
The first linear-Fresnel-reflector solar-power system was developed in Italy in 1961 by Giovanni Francia of the University of Genoa. Francia demonstrated that such a system could create elevated temperatures capable of making a fluid do work. The technology was further investigated by companies such as the FMC Corporation during the 1973 oil crisis, but remained relatively untouched until the early 1990s. In 1993, the first CLFR was developed at the University of Sydney in 1993 and patented in 1995. In 1999, the CLFR design was enhanced by the introduction of the advanced absorber. In 2003 the concept was extended to 3D geometry. Research published in 2010 showed that higher concentrations and higher acceptance angles could be obtained by using nonimaging optics to explore different degrees of freedom in the system such as varying the size and curvature of the heliostats, placing them at a varying height (on a wave-shape curve), and combining the resulting primary with nonimaging secondaries.

== Design ==
=== Reflectors ===
The reflectors are located at the base of the system and converge the sun's rays into the absorber. A key component that makes all LFRs more advantageous than traditional parabolic-trough mirror systems is the use of Fresnel reflectors. These reflectors make use of the Fresnel lens effect, which allows for a concentrating mirror with a large aperture and short focal length while simultaneously reducing the volume of material required for the reflector. This greatly reduces the system's cost since sagged-glass parabolic reflectors are typically very expensive. However, in recent years, thin-film nanotechnology has significantly reduced the cost of parabolic mirrors.

A major challenge that must be addressed in any solar-concentrating technology is the changing angle of the incident rays (the rays of sunlight striking the mirrors) as the sun progresses throughout the day. The reflectors of a CLFR are typically aligned in a north-south orientation and turn about a single axis using a computer-controlled solar tracker system. This allows the system to maintain the proper angle of incidence between the sun's rays and the mirrors, thereby optimizing energy transfer.

=== Absorbers ===
The absorber is located at the focal line of the mirrors. It runs parallel to and above the reflector segments to transport radiation into some working thermal fluid. The basic design of the absorber for the CLFR system is an inverted air cavity with a glass cover enclosing insulated steam tubes, shown in Fig. 1. This design has been demonstrated to be simple and cost effective, with good optical and thermal performance.

Fig. 1: Incident solar rays are concentrated on insulated steam tubes to heat working thermal fluid

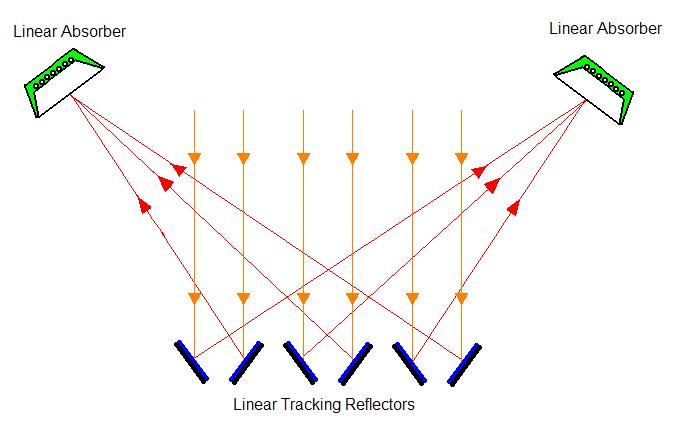
Fig. 2: CLFR solar systems alternate the inclination of their mirrors to focus solar energy on multiple absorbers, improving system efficiency and reducing overall cost.

For optimum performance of the CLFR, several design factors of the absorber must be optimized.

- First, heat transfer between the absorber and the thermal fluid must be maximized. This relies on the surface of the steam tubes being selective. A selective surface optimizes the ratio of energy absorbed to energy emitted. Acceptable surfaces generally absorb 96% of incident radiation while emitting only 7% through infrared radiation. Electrochemically deposited black chrome is generally used for its ample performance and ability to withstand high temperatures.
- Second, the absorber must be designed so that the temperature distribution across the selective surface is uniform. A non-uniform temperature distribution leads to accelerated degradation of the surface. Typically, a uniform temperature of 300 °C (573 K; 572 °F) is desired. Uniform distributions are obtained by changing absorber parameters such as the thickness of insulation above the plate, the size of the aperture of the absorber, and the shape and depth of the air cavity.

As opposed to the traditional LFR, the CLFR makes use of multiple absorbers within the vicinity of its mirrors. These additional absorbers allow the mirrors to alternate their inclination, as illustrated in Fig. 2. This arrangement is advantageous for several reasons.

- First, alternating inclinations minimize the effect of reflectors blocking adjacent reflectors' access to sunlight, thereby improving the system's efficiency.
- Second, multiple absorbers minimize the amount of ground space required for installation. This in turn reduces cost to procure and prepare the land.
- Finally, having the panels in close proximity reduces the length of absorber lines, which reduces both thermal losses through the absorber lines and overall cost for the system.

== Applications ==
Areva Solar (Ausra) built a linear Fresnel reflector plant in New South Wales, Australia. Initially a 1 MW test in 2005, it was expanded to 5 MW in 2006. This reflector plant supplemented the 2,000 MW coal-fired Liddell Power Station. The power generated by the solar thermal steam system is used to provide electricity for the plant's operation, offsetting the plant's internal power usage. AREVA Solar built the 5 MW Kimberlina Solar Thermal Energy Plant in Bakersfield, California, in 2009. This is the first commercial linear Fresnel reflector plant in the United States. The solar collectors were produced at the Ausra factory in Las Vegas. In April 2008, AREVA opened a large factory in Las Vegas to produce linear Fresnel reflectors. The factory was planned to be capable of producing enough solar collectors to provide 200 MW of power per month.

In March 2009, the German company Novatec Biosol constructed a Fresnel solar power plant known as PE 1. The solar thermal power plant uses a standard linear Fresnel optical design (not CLFR) and has an electrical capacity of 1.4 MW. PE 1 comprises a solar boiler with mirror surface of approximately 18,000 m^{2} (1.8 ha; 4.4 acres). The steam is generated by concentrating sunlight directly onto a linear receiver, which is 7.40 metres (24.28 ft) above the ground. An absorber tube is positioned in the focal line of the mirror field; water is heated into 270 °C (543 K; 518 °F) saturated steam. This steam in turn powers a generator. The commercial success of the PE 1 led Novatec Solar to design a 30 MW solar power plant known as PE 2. PE 2 has been in commercial operation since 2012.

From 2013 on, Novatec Solar developed a molten salt system in cooperation with BASF. It uses molten salts as heat transfer fluid in the collector, which is directly transferred to a thermal energy storage. A salt temperature of up to 550 °C (823 K; 1,022 °F) facilitates the running of a conventional steam turbine for electrical generation, enhanced oil recovery, or desalination. A molten salt demonstration plant was realized on PE 1 to prove the technology. Since 2015, FRENELL GmbH, a management buy-out of Novatec Solar, took over the commercial development of the direct molten salt technology.

Solar Fire, an appropriate technology NGO in India, has developed an open-source design for a small, manually operated, 12 kW peak Fresnel concentrator that generates temperatures up to 750 °C (1,020 K; 1,380 °F) and can be used for various thermal applications, including steam powered electricity generation.

The largest CSP system using compact linear Fresnel reflector technology is the 125 MW Reliance Areva CSP plant in India.

In China, a 50 MW commercial-scale Fresnel project using molten salt as its heat-transfer medium has been under construction since 2016. After grid connection in 2019 it now seems to operate successfully, as of 2021.

== See also ==
- Concentrated solar power
- Solar energy
- Solar power in Italy
- Solar thermal energy
- List of solar thermal power stations
