= Novatec Solar =

Novatec Solar is a German provider of solar boilers using linear Fresnel collector technology based in Karlsruhe. Novatec Solar specialises in turnkey solutions, including the manufacture, supply, and assembly of solar fields.

== Timeline ==
In March 2011, ABB acquired 35% of Novatec Solar.

In April 2013, ABB sold its stake in Novatec Solar to existing shareholder Transfield Holdings. After the transaction, Transfield owned approximately 85% of Novatec Solar.

In November 2014, Novatec announced to its bondholders that due to financial problems it was seeking a restructuring of its debt. Andreas Wittke (CEO) and Oliver Mundle (CFO) resigned their positions in the same month.

== Projects ==
Novatec Solar has completed three projects with its linear Fresnel technology.

Puerto Errado 1

Puerto Errado 1, located in southern Spain's Calasparra, was connected to the grid in 2009. With a capacity of 1.4 MW of electrical output, it was the first commercial Fresnel power plant in the world. It has a mirror surface of 18,000 m² divided in two collector rows with a length of 800 m each.

Puerto Errado 2

Puerto Errado 2 is located next to Puerto Errado 1 in southern Spain. It has a capacity of 30MW electric and a mirror surface of 300,000 m² and is in commercial operation since 2012.

Liddell

The Liddell solar field was commissioned in 2010. It has a capacity of 9MW thermal and was used as a fuel saver for the Liddell Power Station.
