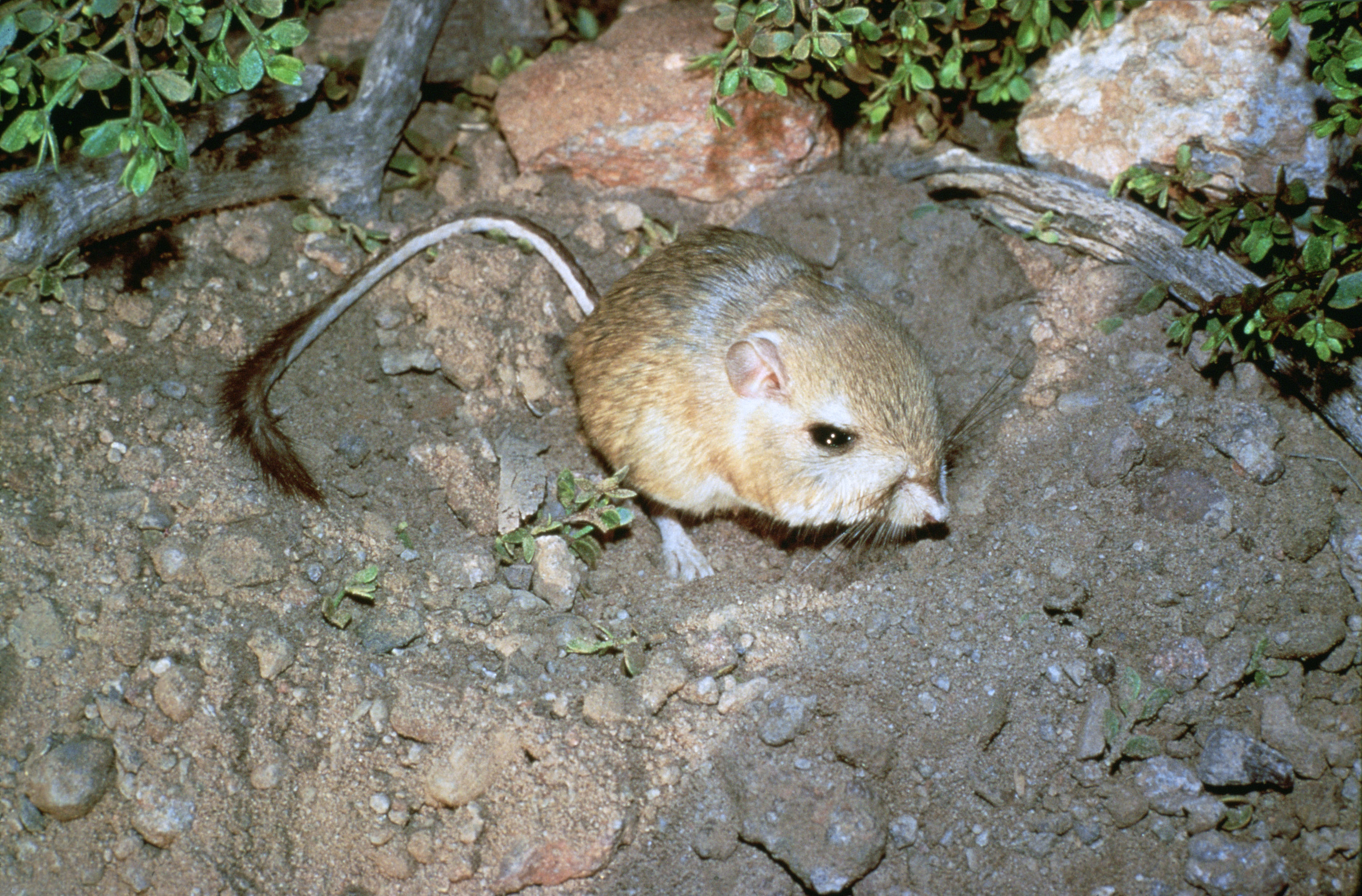

Conservation status
- Endangered (IUCN 3.1)

Scientific classification
- Kingdom: Animalia
- Phylum: Chordata
- Class: Mammalia
- Order: Rodentia
- Family: Heteromyidae
- Genus: Dipodomys
- Species: D. ingens

Binomial name
- Dipodomys ingens (Merriam, 1904)
- IUCN Red List range map for Dipodomys ingens, Version 2021-2

= Giant kangaroo rat =

Species of rodent

The giant kangaroo rat (Dipodomys ingens) is an endangered species of heteromyid rodent endemic to California.

== Description ==
The giant kangaroo rat, is the largest of over 20 species of kangaroo rats, which are small members of the rodent family. It measures about 15 cm (5.9 in) in length, not including its long, tufted tail, and is tan or brown in color. Like other kangaroo rats it has a large head, large eyes, and long, strong hind legs which helps it hop quickly.

The giant kangaroo rat lives on dry, sandy grasslands and digs burrows in loose soil. It lives in colonies, and the individuals communicate with each other by drumming their feet on the ground. These foot thumping signals range from single, short thumps to long, drawn out "footrolls" that can average over 100 drums at 18 drums per second. These audible signals serve both as a warning of approaching danger, as a territorial communication, and to communicate mating status.

Kangaroo rats are primarily seed eaters, but also eat green plants and insects. Most giant kangaroo rats gather seeds when they are available and store them for consumption later. The seeds are put into small pits on the surface of the soil and scattered over the home range of the individual. The small pits only hold the content of the two cheek pouches.

In the spring and summer, individuals generally spend less than two hours of the night foraging above ground. They are very territorial and never leave their den for more than 15 minutes per day. The giant kangaroo rat then stores the seeds in a larder for later eating and gives birth to a litter of 1 to 8 babies, with an average of 3 per litter. It communicates with potential mates by sand-bathing, where the giant kangaroo rat rubs its sides in sand, leaving behind a scent to attract mates. They live for only 2–4 years.

The mating of the giant kangaroo rat is seasonal. During the summer, male rats go out of their normal territories and mate with neighboring female rats. During the winter, the males stay in their original burrow.

== Conservation ==
In 1987, United States Fish and Wildlife classified the kangaroo rat as an endangered species, chiefly due to habitat loss. This species was declared endangered on both the federal and California state levels in the 1980s. It inhabits less than a mere 2% of its original range and can now be found only in isolated areas west of the San Joaquin Valley, including the Carrizo Plain, the Elkhorn Plain, and the Kettleman Hills. The giant kangaroo rat, like many other rodent species, lost much of its habitat as the Central Valley fell under agricultural use. Much information still needs to be obtained regarding their basic biology and compatibility with various land uses before clear directives can be made. Besides some projects currently underway in the Carrizo Plain National Monument, studies need to be conducted on populations whose range overlaps with private lands. Recovery of the giant kangaroo rat can be achieved when the three largest populations in eastern Kern County, Carrizo Plain Natural Area, and the Panoche Region along with the populations in the Kettleman Hills, San Juan Creek Valley and Cuyama Valley are protected and managed appropriately. In a unique case, a giant kangaroo rat population was found during the construction of the second track at Buttonwillow Raceway Park. The track design was modified and a protected habitat was created in the middle of the new track.

Endangered Dipodomys ingens populations have become more dispersed and less numerous over time. This can have major side effects to the genetic diversity of the species. D. ingens populations only cover about 3% of the territory they historically occupied. Agricultural development has severely impacted the habitats of this rodent, and restricted it to several small isolated areas. Because of this, D. ingens is at risk for genetic drift and inbreeding within smaller populations. D. ingens lives in metapopulation structures due to their habitats being taken over by humans. They are divided into several small remnant populations that are unable to disperse over larger areas because of topographical limitations. This is a larger problem for northern subpopulations of than those in the south. D. ingens is believed to be polygynous (one male, multiple females) but a common ratio between male and female partners has not yet been found. The study showed that translocation was a successful method for increasing diversity and population size of D. ingens.

In early 2013, a collaboration was set up between the Bitter Creek National Wildlife Refuge, CSU Stanislaus's Endangered Species Recovery Program, and the Endangered Species Recovery Program. This recovery plan established the Small Mammal Monitoring Project, focusing on adaptive management and promoting the growth of grasslands with low vegetation.

In 2017, a combination of trapping and satellite imaging was used to determine habitat suitability and conduct and index of presence in the San Joaquin Desert. Since burrow mounds are fairly large, typically inhabited by one rat, and uniformly spaced apart, this made it possible to use aerial surveys and Google Earth satellite imagery. This study highlighted high-quality habitat areas to focus on for future management decisions.
