= Areva Solar =

American power company

AREVA Solar
- Type: Subsidiary of Areva
- Industry: Solar energy
- Predecessor: Ausra Inc.
- Founded: 2007 as Ausra Inc.
- Founder: Dr. David Mills, Prof. Graham Morrison, Peter Le Lievre
- Headquarters: Mountain View, California, United States
- Key people: Sam Shakir (CEO)
- Products: CSP technology
- Services: Design, manufacture and installation of solar steam generators
- Number of employees: 120
- Parent: Areva
- Website: www.solar.areva.com

Areva Solar was part of the renewable energies portfolio of the French nuclear group Areva, headquartered in Mountain View, California, with offices in the United States and Australia. It designed, manufactured and installed solar steam generators for electric power production and industrial steam uses. Before 2010, the company existed as Ausra Inc. In August 2014, AREVA announced it was shuttering AREVA Solar.

== History ==
Ausra was formed as Solar Heat and Power Pty Ltd in 2002 in Sydney, Australia. The company was co-founded by Dr. David Mills, Professor Graham Morrison and Peter Le Lievre. Solar Heat and Power Pty Ltd constructed a 1MW pilot solar plant at Liddell Power Station in 2005 and then began work on a 5MW extension to that project in 2006. The project was renamed the "John Marcheff Solar Project" by its owner, Macquarie Generation.

Solar Heat and Power relocated to the United States in 2007 and was renamed as Ausra. The company began operation of its 130,000-square-foot (12,000 m^{2}) solar thermal power systems plant in Las Vegas in July 2008. The facility was the first comprehensive solar thermal manufacturing plant in the United States.

In the fallout of the 2008–09 recession, Ausra laid off 10% of its workers and redirected its efforts toward making solar equipment for other companies rather than building its own power plants. In October 2008, Ausra launched the 5 MW Kimberlina Solar Thermal Energy Plant in Bakersfield, California. In November 2009 the company canceled its plans to build the 177 MW Carrizo Energy Solar Farm in California.

In November 2009, Ausra announced that it was seeking to sell itself, because "it will not be able to deploy its capital-intensive solar technology on a large scale without the backing of major company."

In February 2010, the Areva bought Ausra, and renamed it Areva Solar.

However, in August 2014, Areva exited the Solar industry following the Fukushima nuclear disaster.

== Organization ==
Areva Solar was one of four units in Areva's renewable energies business group. Sam Shakir was CEO of Areva Solar. He succeeded Bill Gallo former CEO of AREVA Federal Services in 2012. In 2011, Gallo replaced Dr. Robert Fishman former CEO of Ausra. In 2007, Fishman replaced founding Ausra CEO Peter Le Lievre AREVA Solar was headquartered in Mountain View, California.

== Technology ==
Areva Solar specialized in concentrated solar power (CSP) technology, which uses lenses and mirrors to direct a large area of sunlight onto a small surface. In particular, the group employs Compact Linear Fresnel Reflector (CLFR) technology, a type of CSP in which flat moving reflectors follow the path of the sun and reflect its radiation to the fixed pipe receivers above. Water flows through the receivers, generating saturated and superheated solar steam, which in turn generates electricity.

CLFR differs from other forms of CSP because the mirrors are flat rather than parabolic, and they turn on a single axis, following the sun. They are cheaper to produce than parabolic mirrors, and they are smaller, allowing more reflectors to be installed in less space.

== Projects ==
Areva Solar had a number of projects aimed to advance research and development activities in the renewable energy sector.

Kimberlina solar plant in Bakersfield, California, began operation in October 2008. It was the first new CSP facility in California in nearly 20 years. The Kimberlina plant had a 5-MW capacity—enough power for 3,500 homes in central California. It was the first CLFR plant to be built in North America.

Areva Solar commenced a 44-MW solar thermal addition with CS Energy to the existing 750-MW Kogan Creek Power Station in Queensland, Australia. This station was to produce more electricity with the same amount of coal. The project, subsidized by the Australian government, was estimated to cost A$104.7 million. It would be the world's largest solar integration with a coal-fired plant, designed to reduce the facility's greenhouse gas emissions by 35,600 metric tons annually. However by March 2016 this project had been cancelled only partially completed.

In April 2012, Areva Solar announced that it would build a concentrated solar power (CSP) installation in Rajasthan, India. It would be Asia’s largest CSP installation and would be operated by India’s Reliance Power Limited.

In 2014 the Areva CLFR Reliance Rajasthan plant was commissioned.
