= Applications of photovoltaics =

There are many practical applications for solar panels or photovoltaics. From the fields of the agricultural industry as a power source for irrigation to its usage in remote health care facilities to refrigerate medical supplies. Other applications include power generation at various scales and attempts to integrate them into homes and public infrastructure. PV modules are used in photovoltaic systems and include a large variety of electrical devices.

== Infrastructure ==
=== Rooftop and building integrated systems ===
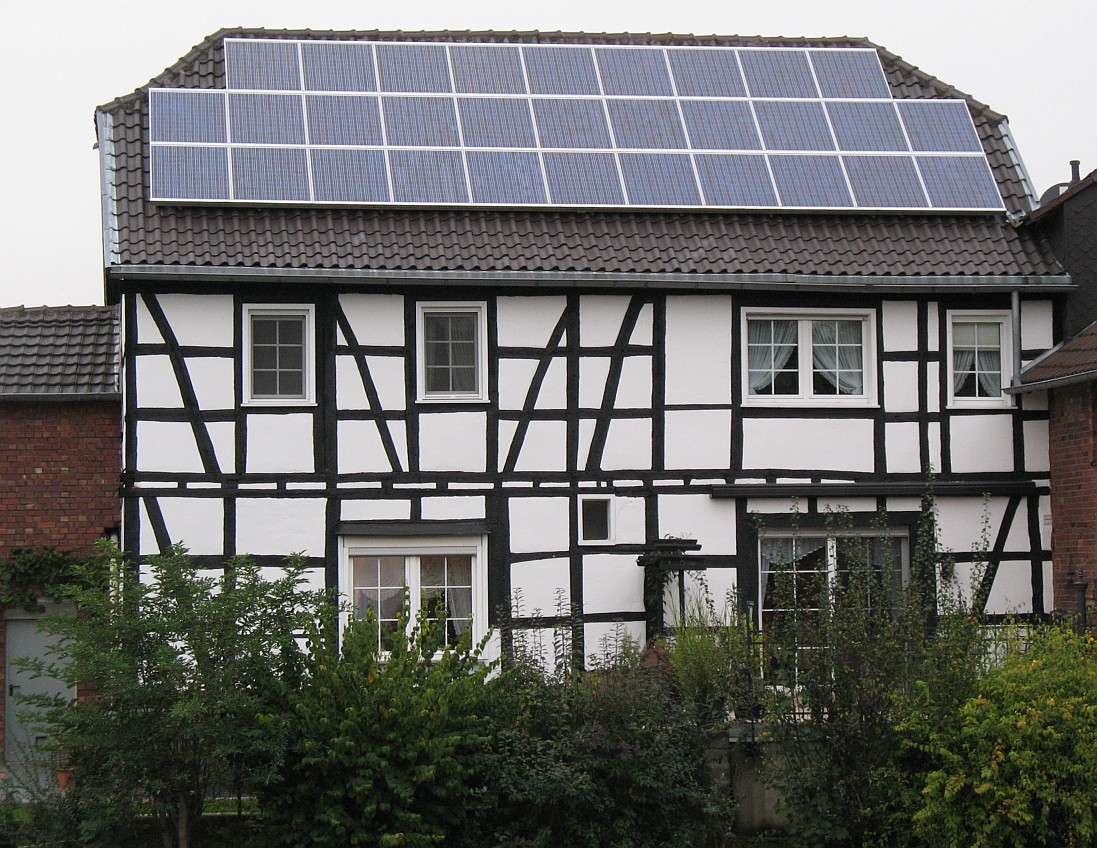
Rooftop PV on half-timbered house

Photovoltaic arrays are often associated with buildings: either integrated into them, mounted on them or mounted nearby on the ground. Rooftop PV systems are most often retrofitted into existing buildings, usually mounted on top of the existing roof structure or on the existing walls. Alternatively, an array can be located separately from the building but connected by cable to supply power for the building. Building-integrated photovoltaics (BIPV) are increasingly incorporated into the roof or walls of new domestic and industrial buildings as a principal or ancillary source of electrical power. Roof tiles with integrated PV cells are sometimes used as well. Provided there is an open gap in which air can circulate, rooftop mounted solar panels can provide a passive cooling effect on buildings during the day and also keep accumulated heat in at night. Typically, residential rooftop systems have small capacities of around 5–10 kW, while commercial rooftop systems often amount to several hundreds of kilowatts. Although rooftop systems are much smaller than ground-mounted utility-scale power plants, they account for most of the worldwide installed capacity.

=== Indoor Photovoltaics (IPV) ===
Indoor photovoltaics have the potential to supply power to the Internet of Things, such as smart sensors and communication devices, providing a solution to the battery limitations such as power consumption, toxicity, and maintenance. Ambient indoor lighting, such as LEDs and fluorescent lights, emit enough radiation to power small electronic devices or devices with low-power demand. In these applications, indoor photovoltaics will be able to improve reliability and increase lifetimes of wireless networks, especially important with the significant number of wireless sensors that will be installed in the coming years.

Due to the lack of access to solar radiation, the intensity of energy harvested by indoor photovoltaics is usually three orders of magnitude smaller than sunlight, which will affect the efficiencies of the photovoltaic cells. The optimal band gap for indoor light harvesting is around 1.9-2 eV, compared to the optimum of 1.4 eV for outdoor light harvesting. The increase in optimal band gap also results in a larger open-circuit voltage (VOC), which affects the efficiency as well. Silicon photovoltaics, the most common type of photovoltaic cell in the market, is only able to reach an efficiency of around 8% when harvesting ambient indoor light, compared to its 26% efficiency in sunlight. One possible alternative is to use amorphous silicon, a-Si, as it has a wider band gap of 1.6 eV compared to its crystalline counterpart, causing it to be more suitable to capture the indoor light spectra.

Other promising materials and technologies for indoor photovoltaics include thin-film materials, III-V light harvesters, organic photovoltaics (OPV), dye-sensitized solar cells and perovskite solar cells.

- Thin-film materials, specifically CdTe, have displayed good performance under low light and diffuse conditions, with a band gap of 1.5 eV.
- Some single junction III-V cells have band gaps in the range of 1.8 to 1.9 eV, which have been shown to maintain good performances under indoor lighting, with an efficiency of over 20%.
- There has been various organic photovoltaics that have demonstrated efficiencies of over 16% from indoor lighting, despite having low efficiencies in energy harvesting under sunlight. This is due to the fact that OPVs have a large absorption coefficient, adjustable absorptions ranges, as well as small leakage currents in dim light, allowing them to convert indoor lighting more efficiently compared to inorganic PVs.
- Dye-sensitized solar cells have reached efficiencies of over 28% under low light illumination, through judicious design of sensitizers and electrolytes.
- Perovskite solar cells have been tested to display efficiencies over 25% in low light levels. While perovskite solar cells often contain lead, raising the concern of toxicity, lead-free perovskite inspired materials also show promise as indoor photovoltaics. While plenty of research is being conducted on perovskite cells, further research is needed to explore its possibilities for IPVs and developing products that can be used to power the internet of things.

=== Solar pumps ===
One of the most cost effective solar applications is a solar powered pump, as it is far cheaper to purchase a solar panel than it is to run power lines. They often meet a need for water beyond the reach of power lines, taking the place of a windmill or windpump. One common application is the filling of livestock watering tanks, so that grazing cattle may drink. Another is the refilling of drinking water storage tanks on remote or self-sufficient homes.

=== Solar street lights ===
Solar street lights raised light sources which are powered by photovoltaic panels generally mounted on the lighting structure. The solar array of such off-grid PV system charges a rechargeable battery, which powers a fluorescent or LED lamp during the night. Solar street lights are stand-alone power systems, and have the advantage of savings on trenching, landscaping, and maintenance costs, as well as on the electric bills, despite their higher initial cost compared to conventional street lighting. They are designed with sufficiently large batteries to ensure operation for at least a week and even in the worst situation, they are expected to dim only slightly.

=== Rural electrification ===
Developing countries where many villages are often more than five kilometres away from grid power are increasingly using photovoltaics. In remote locations in India a rural lighting program has been providing solar powered LED lighting to replace kerosene lamps. The solar powered lamps were sold at about the cost of a few months' supply of kerosene. Cuba is working to provide solar power for areas that are off grid. More complex applications of off-grid solar energy use include 3D printers. RepRap 3D printers have been solar powered with photovoltaic technology, which enables distributed manufacturing for sustainable development. These are areas where the social costs and benefits offer an excellent case for going solar, though the lack of profitability has relegated such endeavors to humanitarian efforts. However, in 1995 solar rural electrification projects had been found to be difficult to sustain due to unfavorable economics, lack of technical support, and a legacy of ulterior motives of north-to-south technology transfer.

== Power generation ==
=== Photovoltaic thermal hybrid solar collector ===
Photovoltaic thermal hybrid solar collector (PVT) are systems that convert solar radiation into thermal and electrical energy. These systems combine a solar PV cell, which converts sunlight into electricity, with a solar thermal collector, which captures the remaining energy and removes waste heat from the PV module. The capture of both electricity and heat allow these devices to have higher exergy and thus be more overall energy efficient than solar PV or solar thermal alone.

=== Power stations ===
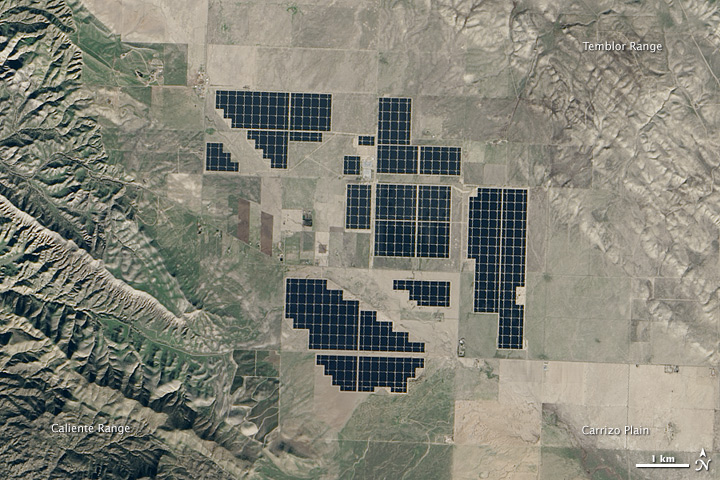
Satellite image of the Topaz Solar Farm

Many utility-scale solar farms have been constructed all over the world. In 2011 the 579-megawatt (MW_{AC}) Solar Star project was proposed, to be followed by the Desert Sunlight Solar Farm and the Topaz Solar Farm in the future, both with a capacity of 550 MW_{AC}, to be constructed by US-company First Solar, using CdTe modules, a thin-film PV technology. All three power stations will be located in the Californian desert. When the Solar Star project was completed in 2015, it was the world's largest photovoltaic power station at the time.

=== Specialty Power Systems ===
Photovoltaics may also be incorporated as energy conversion devices for objects at elevated temperatures and with preferable radiative emissivities such as heterogeneous combustors.

=== Hybrid power systems ===
Hybrid systems combine two or more modes of electricity generation together, usually renewable technologies such as solar photovoltaic (PV) and wind turbines. These systems often yield greater economic and environmental returns than wind, solar, geothermal or trigeneration stand-alone systems by themselves.

=== Concentrated photovoltaics ===
Concentrated solar power (CSP) systems generate solar power by using a combination of mirrors or lenses to concentrate a large area of sunlight onto a receiver. Electricity is generated when the concentrated light is converted to heat (solar thermal energy), which drives a heat engine (usually a steam turbine) connected to an electrical power generator or powers a thermochemical reaction.

== Transportation ==
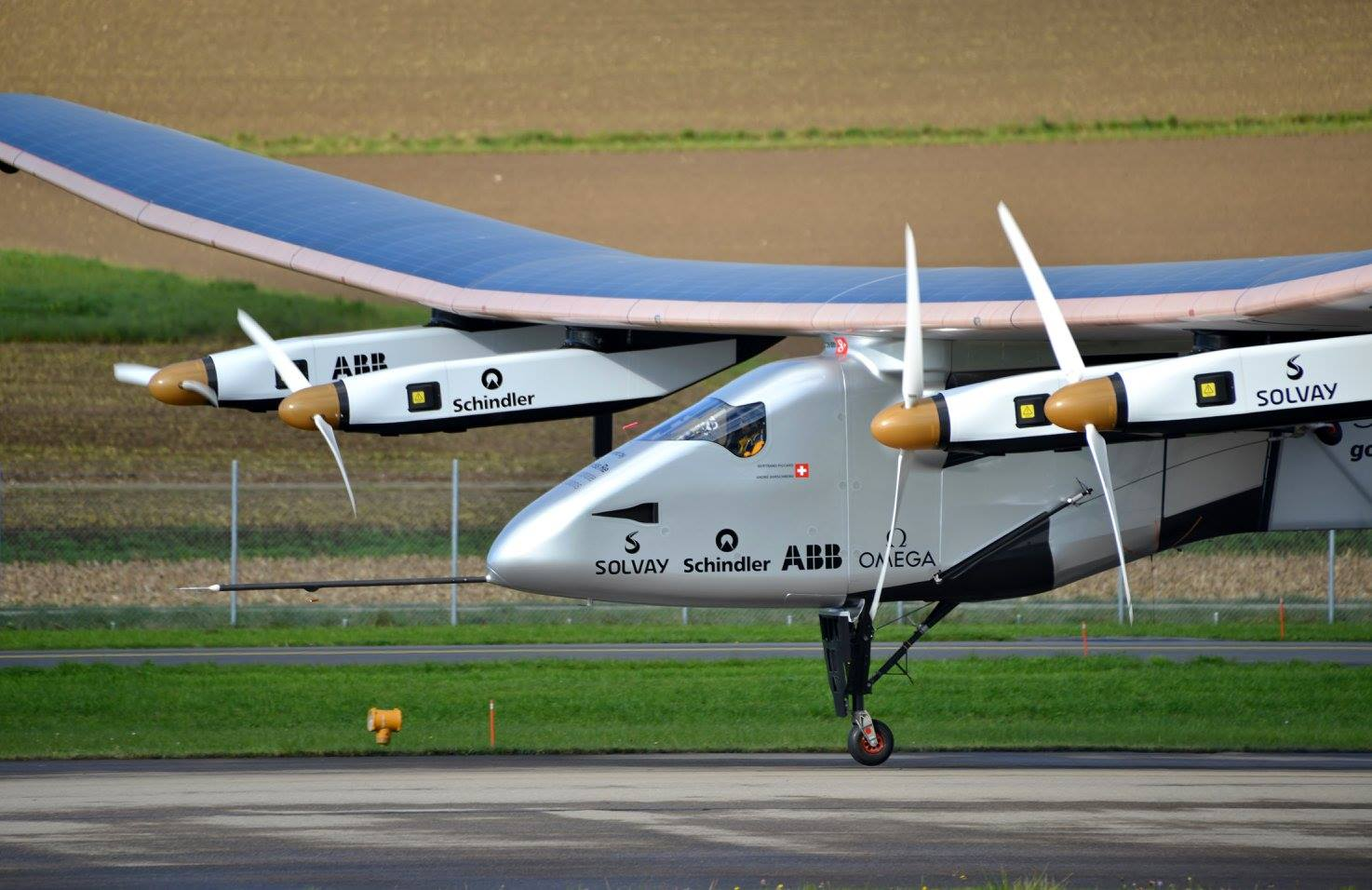
Solar Impulse 2, a solar aircraft

PV has traditionally been used for electric power in space. PV is rarely used to provide motive power in transport applications, but it can provide auxiliary power in boats and cars. Some automobiles are fitted with solar-powered air conditioning. A self-contained solar vehicle would have limited power and utility, but a solar-charged electric vehicle allows use of solar power for transportation. Solar-powered cars, boats and airplanes have been demonstrated, with the most practical and likely of these being solar cars. The Swiss solar aircraft, Solar Impulse 2, achieved the longest non-stop solo flight in history and completed the first solar-powered aerial circumnavigation of the globe in 2016.

=== Solar vehicles ===
Solar vehicle, whether ground, water, air or space vehicles may obtain some or all of the energy required for their operation from the sun. Surface and air vehicles generally require higher power levels than can be sustained by a practically sized solar array, so a battery assists in meeting peak power demand, and the solar array recharges it. Space vehicles have successfully used solar photovoltaic systems for years of operation, eliminating the weight of fuel or primary batteries.

=== Spacecraft applications ===
Solar panels on spacecraft have been one of the first applications of photovoltaics since the launch of Vanguard 1 in 1958, the first satellite to use solar cells. Contrary to Sputnik, the first artificial satellite to orbit the planet, that ran out of batteries within 21 days due to the lack of solar-power, most modern communications satellites and space probes in the inner Solar System rely on the use of solar panels to derive electricity from sunlight.

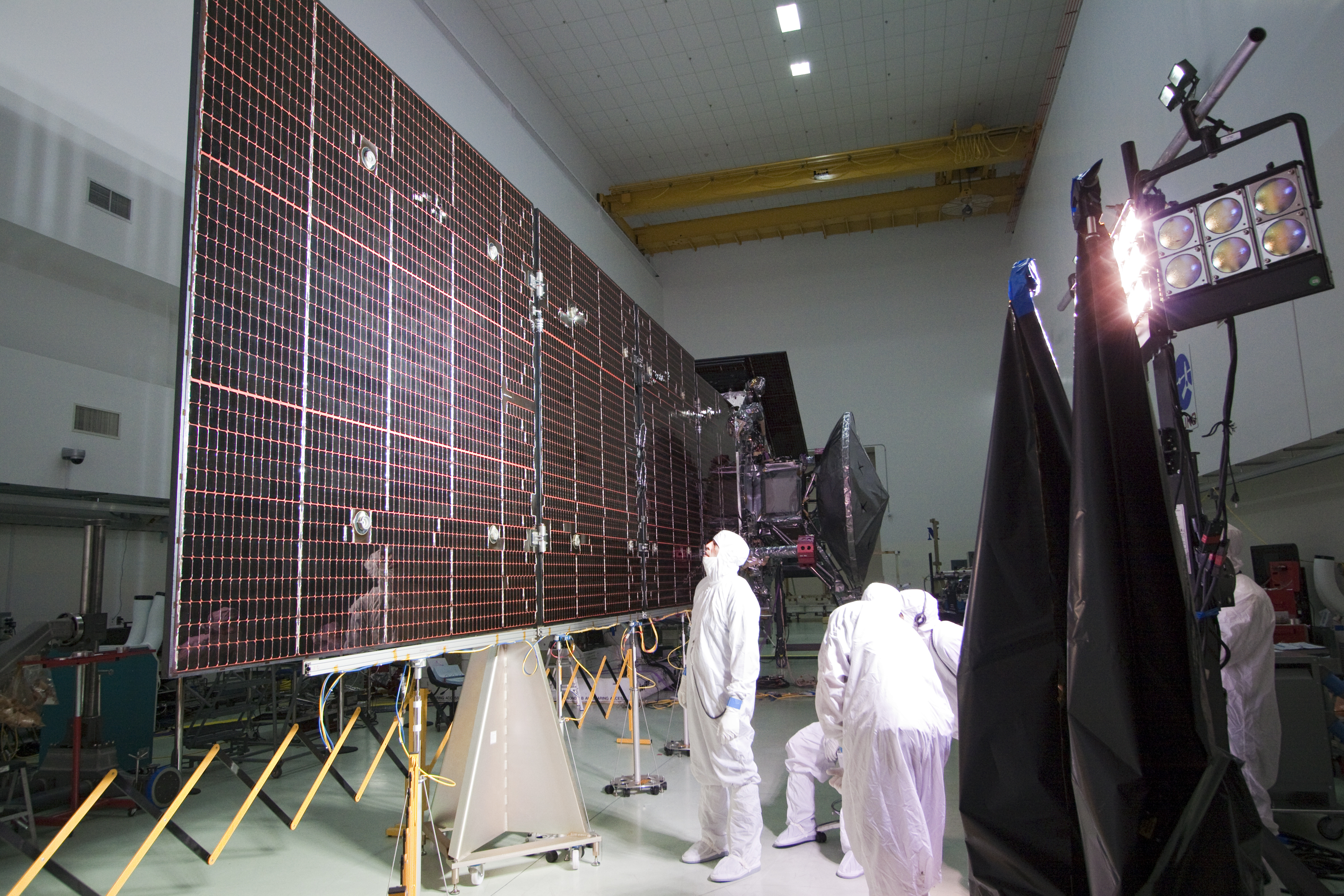
Part of Juno's solar array

Solar panels on spacecraft are usually the sole source of power to run the sensors, active heating and cooling, and communications. A battery stores this energy for use when the solar panels are in shadow. In some, the power is also used for spacecraft propulsion—electric propulsion. Spacecraft were one of the earliest applications of photovoltaics, starting with the silicon solar cells used on the Vanguard 1 satellite, launched by the US in 1958. Since then, solar power has been used on missions ranging from the MESSENGER probe to Mercury, to as far out in the Solar System as the Juno probe to Jupiter. The largest solar power system flown in space is the electrical system of the International Space Station. To increase the power generated per kilogram, typical spacecraft solar panels use high-cost, high-efficiency, and close-packed rectangular multi-junction solar cells made of gallium arsenide (GaAs) and other semiconductor materials.

== Standalone systems ==
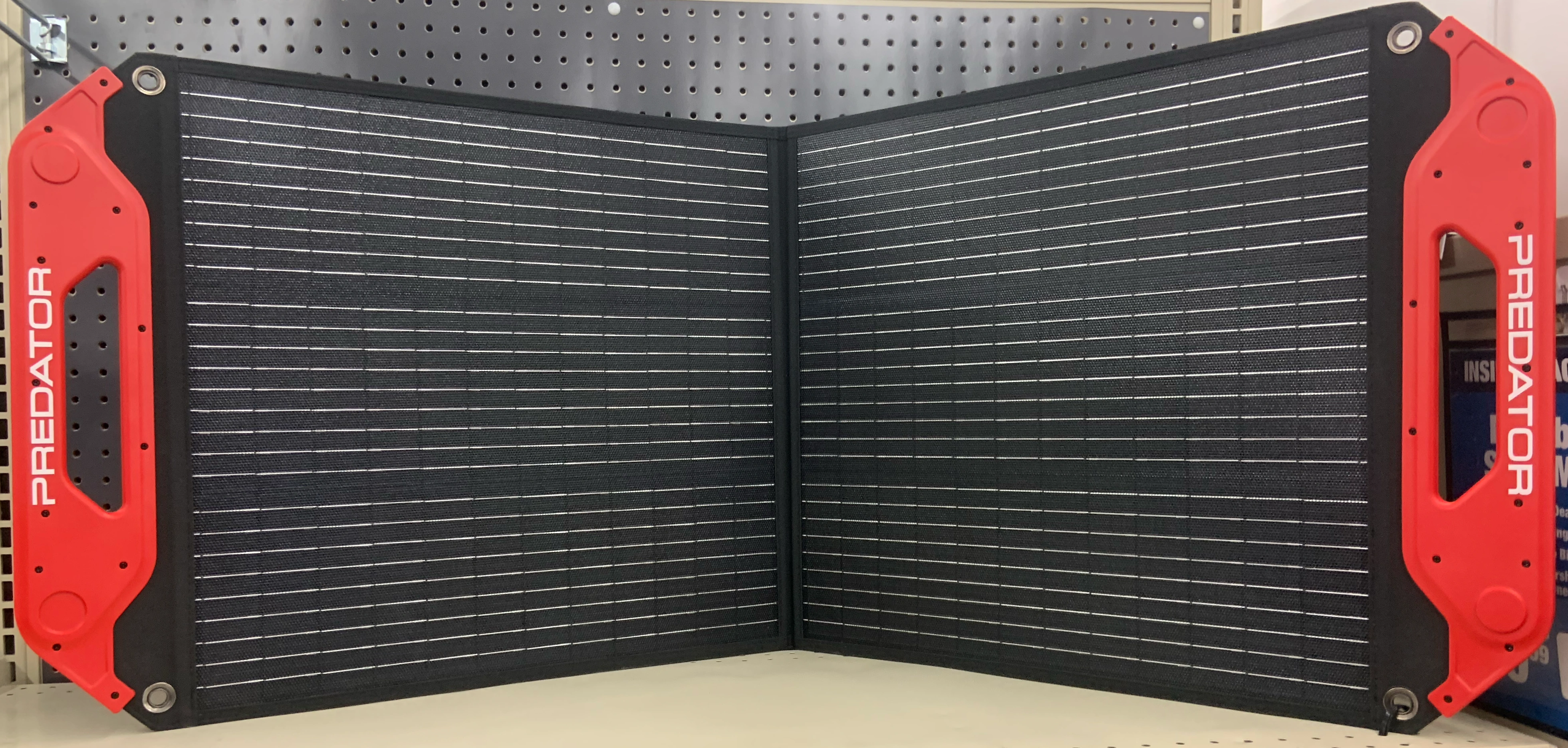
Foldable solar panel

Until a decade or so ago, PV was used frequently to power calculators and novelty devices. Improvements in integrated circuits and low power liquid crystal displays make it possible to power such devices for several years between battery changes, making PV use less common. In contrast, solar powered remote fixed devices have seen increasing use recently in locations where significant connection cost makes grid power prohibitively expensive. Such applications include solar lamps, solar picnic tables, water pumps, parking meters, emergency telephones, trash compactors, temporary traffic signs, charging stations, and remote guard posts and signals.

=== Agrivoltaics ===
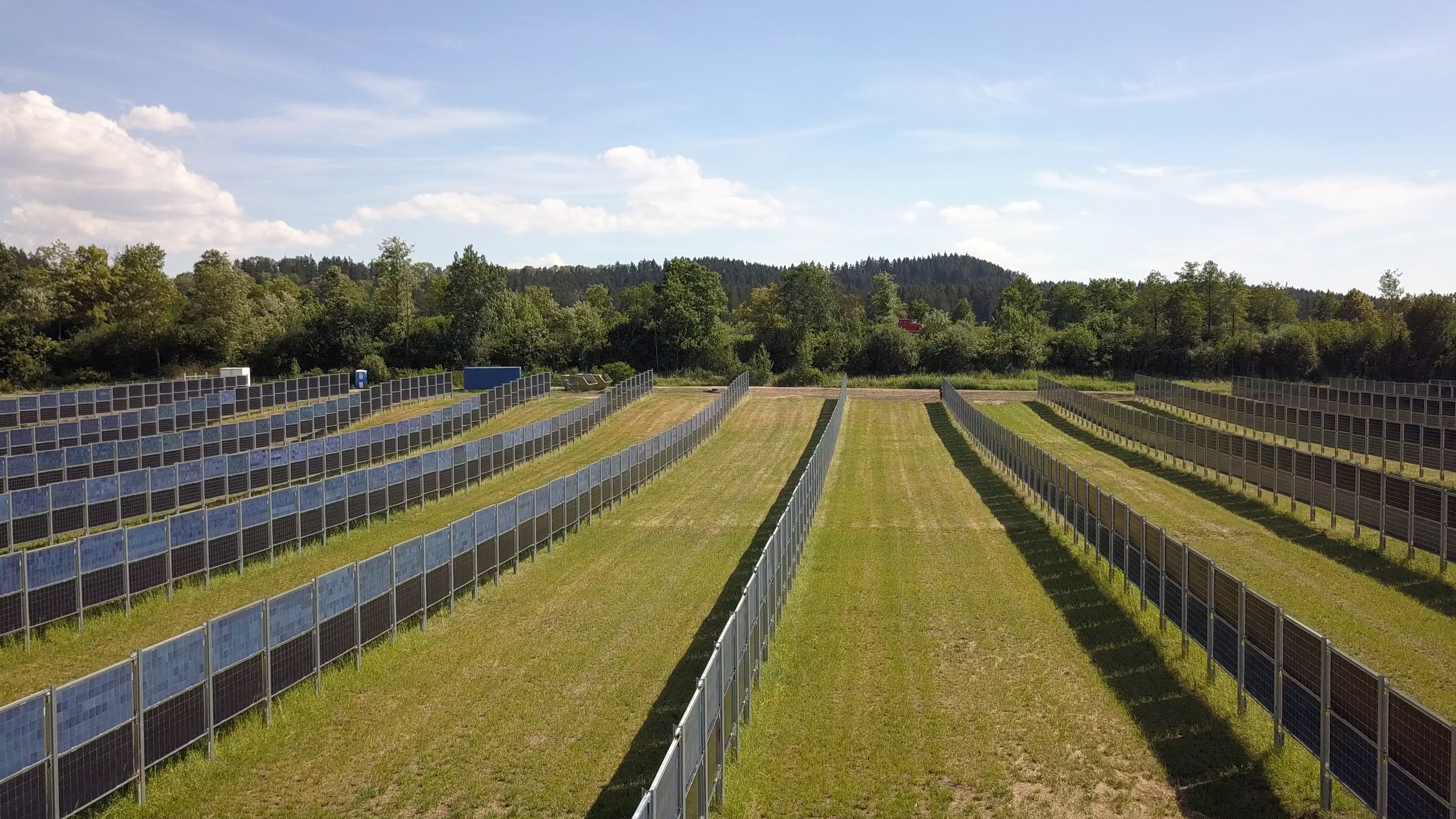
Vertical bifacial solar panels

A number of experimental solar farms have been established around the world that attempt to integrate solar power generation with agriculture. An Italian manufacturer has promoted a design which track the sun's daily path across the sky to generate more electricity than conventional fixed-mounted systems.

=== Telecommunication and signaling ===
Solar PV power is ideally suited for telecommunication applications such as local telephone exchange, radio and TV broadcasting, microwave and other forms of electronic communication links. This is because, in most telecommunication application, storage batteries are already in use and the electrical system is basically DC. In hilly and mountainous terrain, radio and TV signals may not reach as they get blocked or reflected back due to undulating terrain. At these locations, low power transmitters (LPT) are installed to receive and retransmit the signal for local population.

=== Pico PV systems ===
The smallest, often portable photovoltaic systems are called pico solar PV systems, or pico solar. They mostly combine a rechargeable battery and charge controller, with a very small PV panel. The panel's nominal capacity is just a few watt-peak (1–10 W_{p}) and its area less than 0.1 square metres (1 ft^{2}) in size. A large range of different applications can be solar powered such as music players, fans, portable lamps, security lights, solar lighting kits, solar lanterns and street light (see below), phone chargers, radios, or even small, seven-inch LCD televisions, that run on less than ten watts. As it is the case for power generation from pico hydro, pico PV systems are useful in small, rural communities that require only a small amount of electricity. Since the efficiency of many appliances have improved considerably, in particular due to the usage of LED lights and efficient rechargeable batteries, pico solar has become an affordable alternative, especially in the developing world. The metric prefix pico- stands for a trillionth to indicate the smallness of the system's electric power.

== Do it yourself community ==
With a growing interest in environmentally friendly green energy, hobbyists in the DIY-community have endeavored to build their own solar PV systems from kits or partly DIY. Usually, the DIY-community uses inexpensive or high efficiency systems (such as those with solar tracking) to generate their own power. As a result, the DIY-systems often end up cheaper than their commercial counterparts. Often the system is also connected to the regular power grid, using net metering instead of a battery for backup. These systems usually generate power amount of ≈2 kW or less. Through the internet, the community is now able to obtain plans to (partly) construct the system and there is a growing trend toward building them for domestic requirements.

== Gallery of standalone systems ==
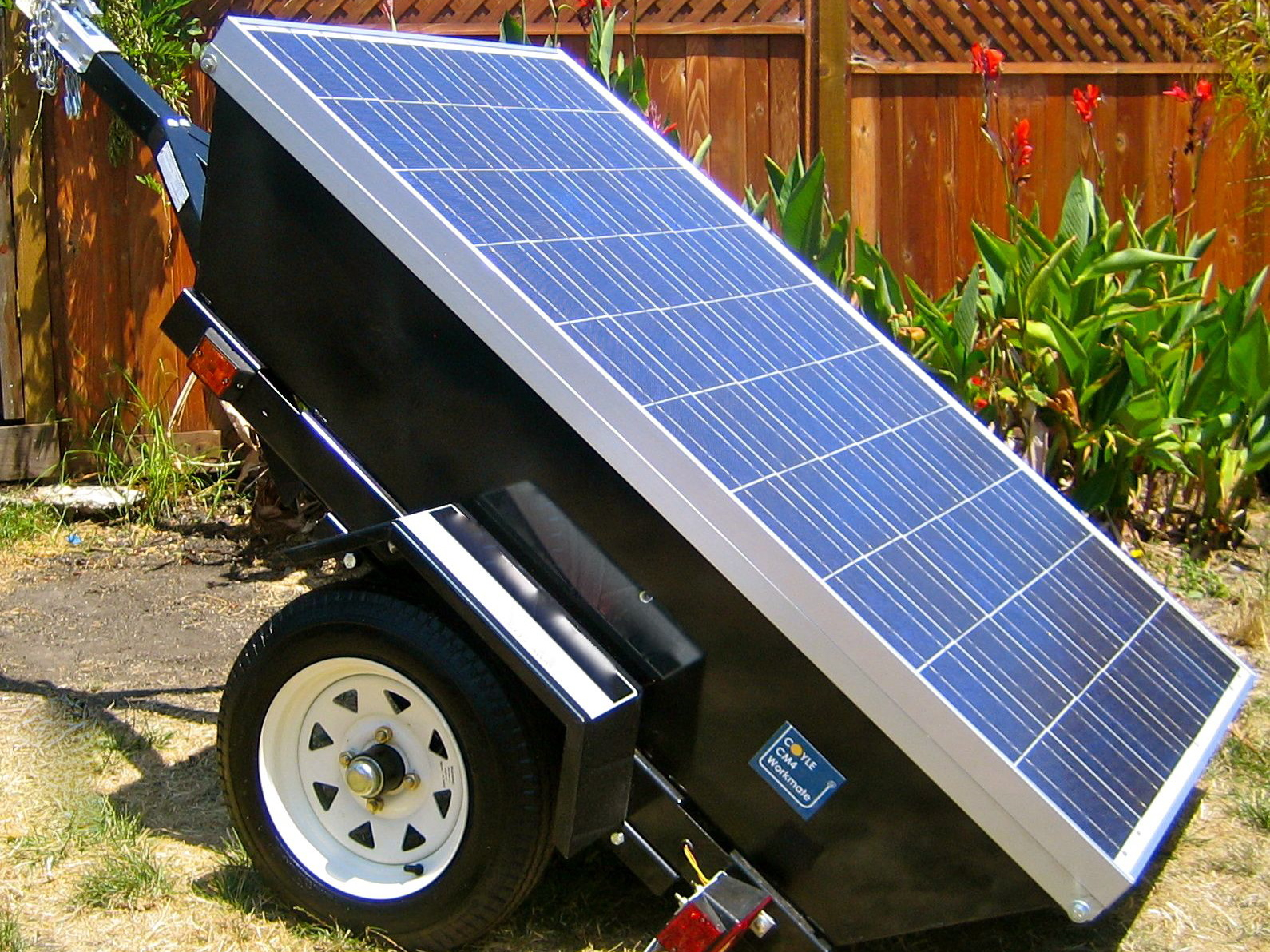
Profile picture of a mobile solar powered generator

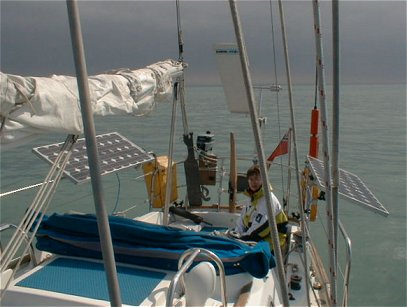
Solar panels on a small yacht to charge 12 volt batteries up to 9 amps

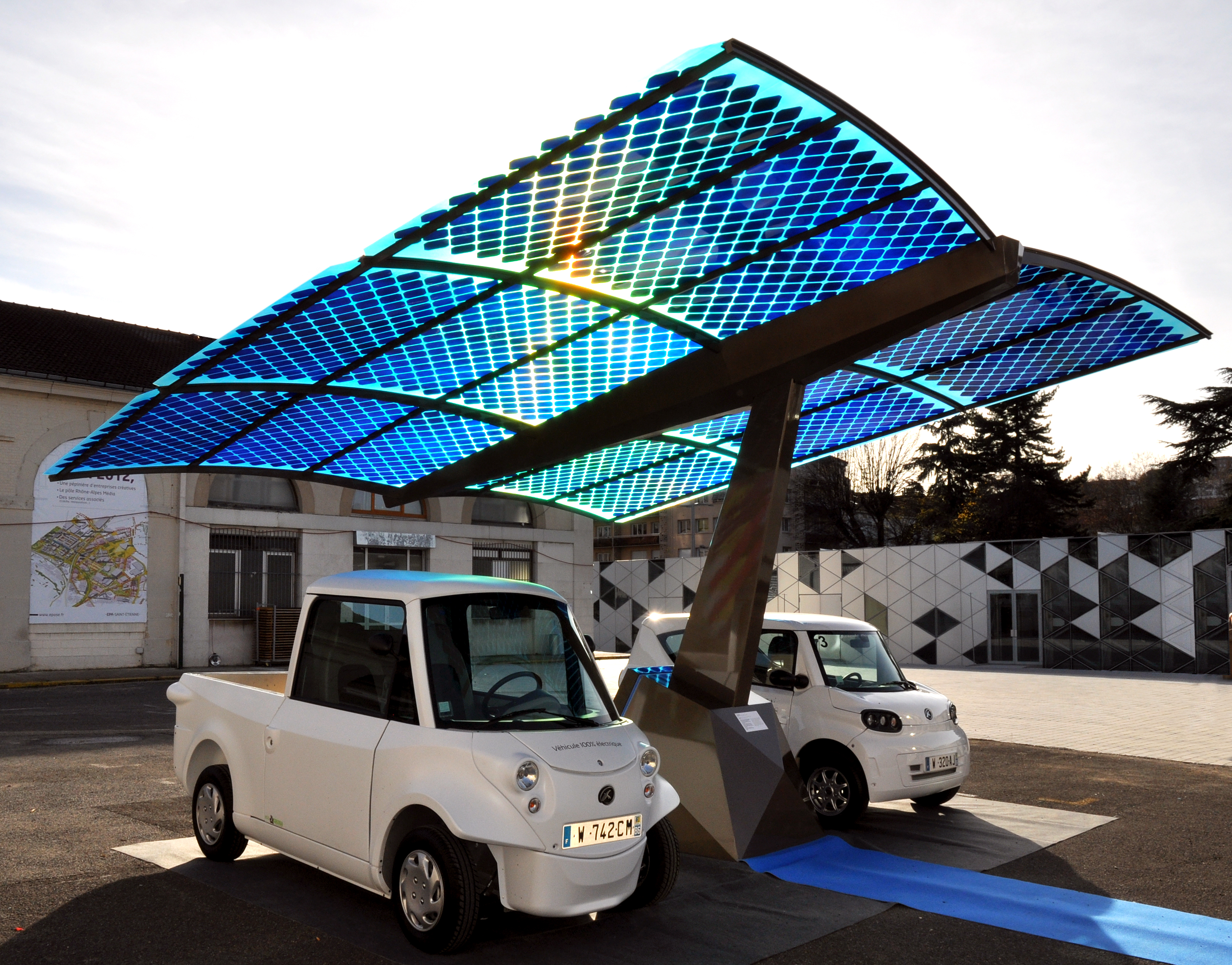
A mobile charging station for electric vehicles in France

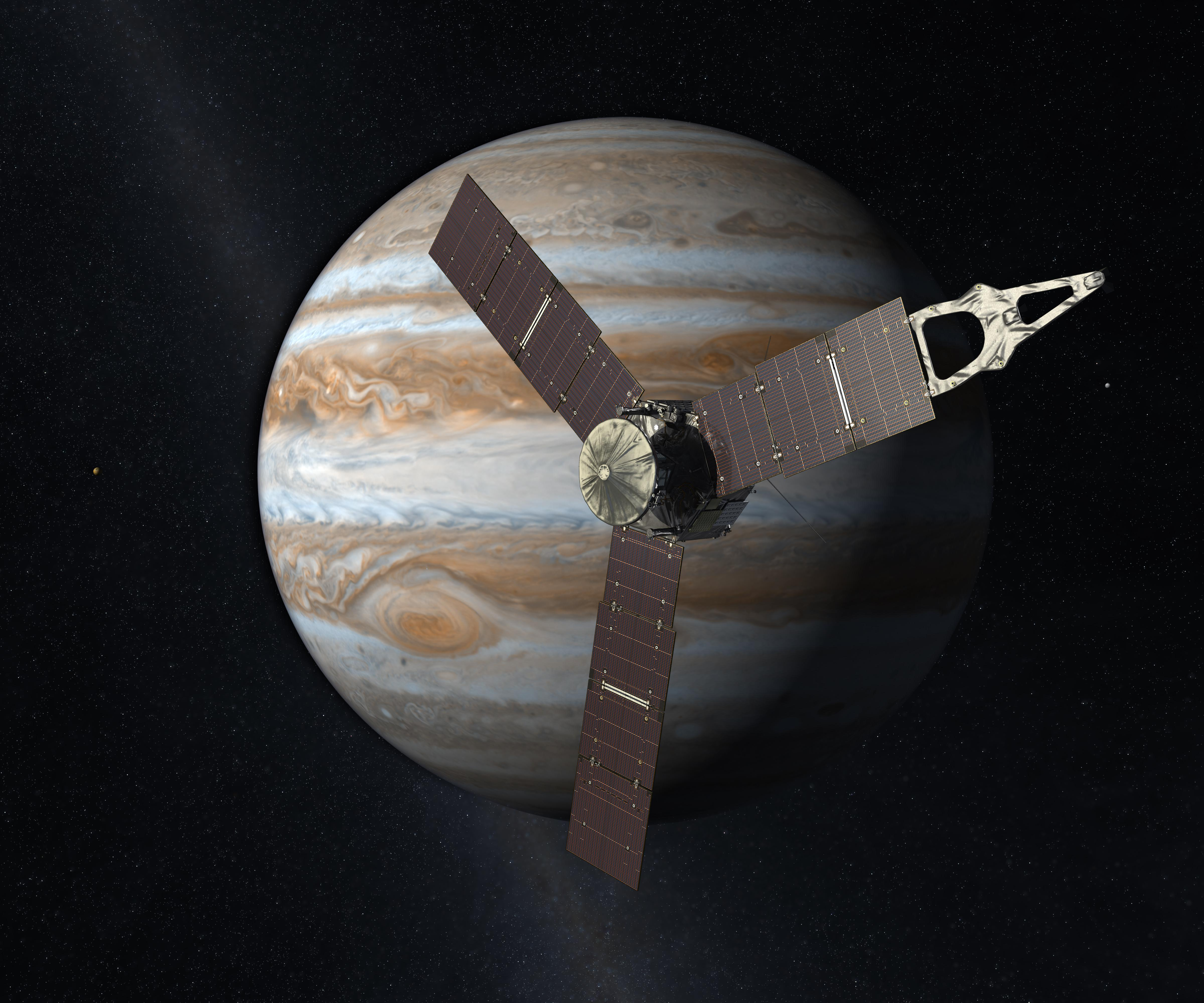
Artist's concept of the Juno spacecraft orbiting Jupiter - furthest spacecraft to be powered by solar cells

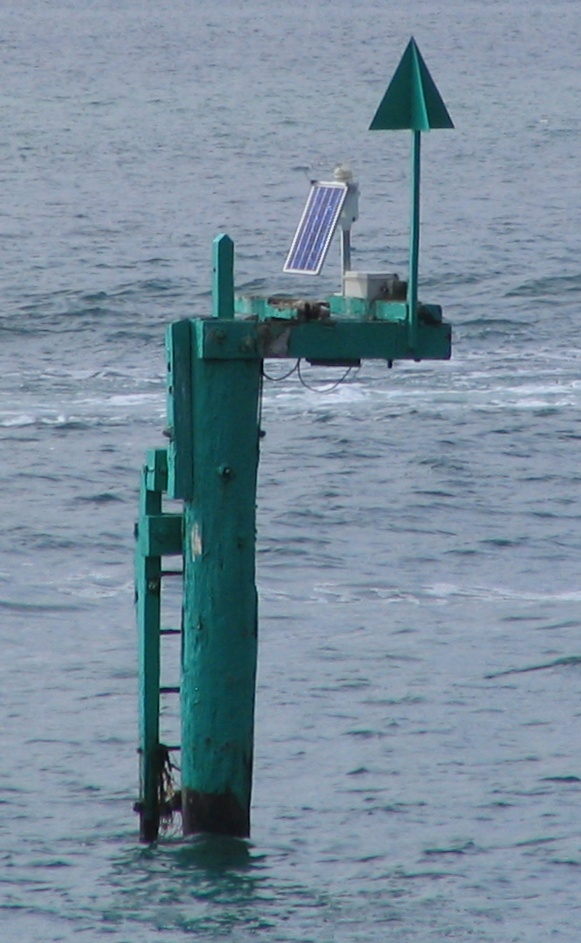
A lateral mark, Otago Harbour, New Zealand

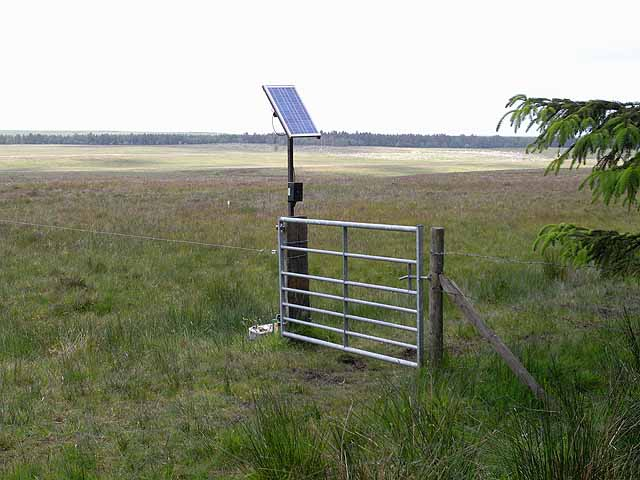
Solar powered electric fence, in Harwood, Northumberland, England

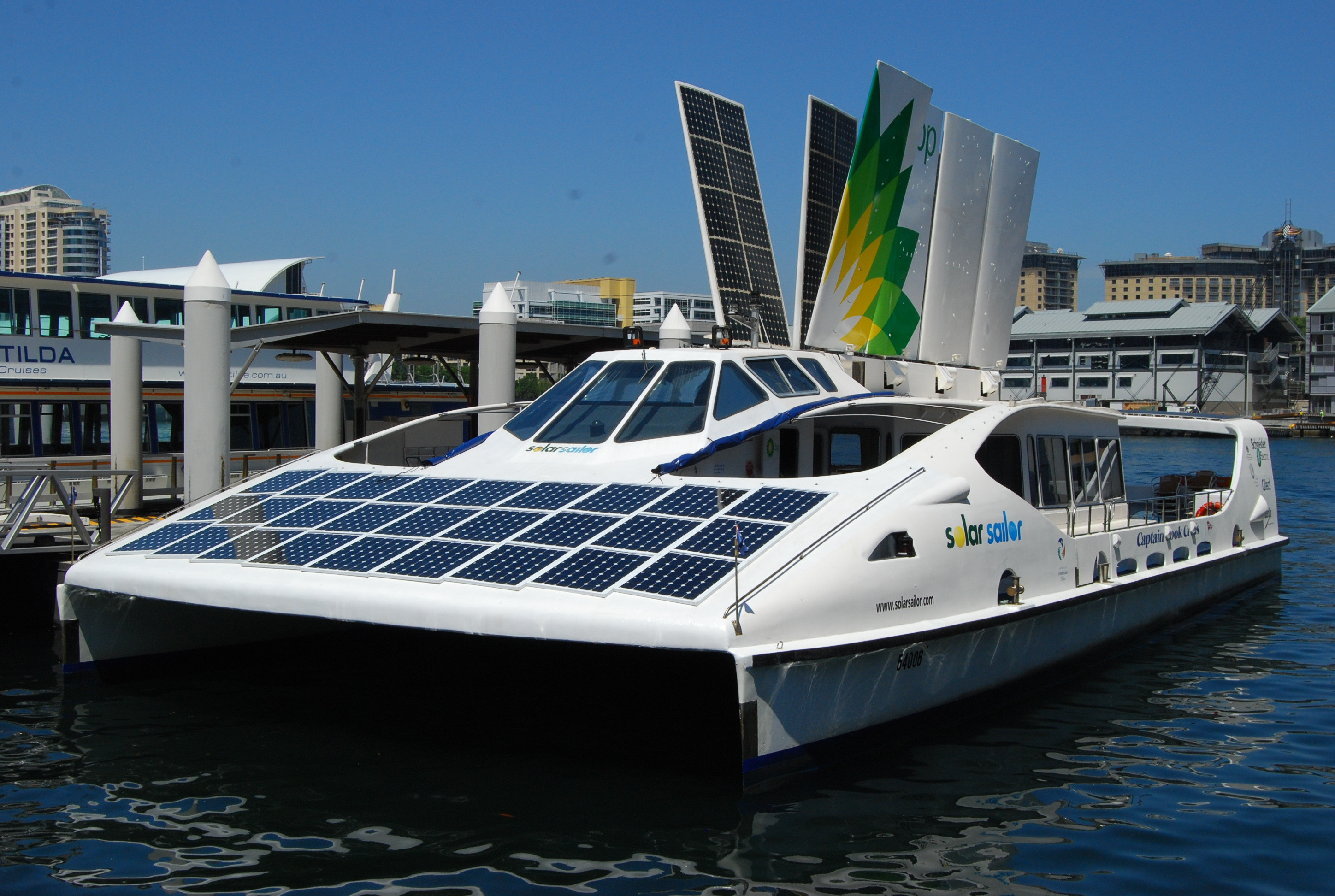
Solar sailor boat, Darling Harbour, Sydney, Australia

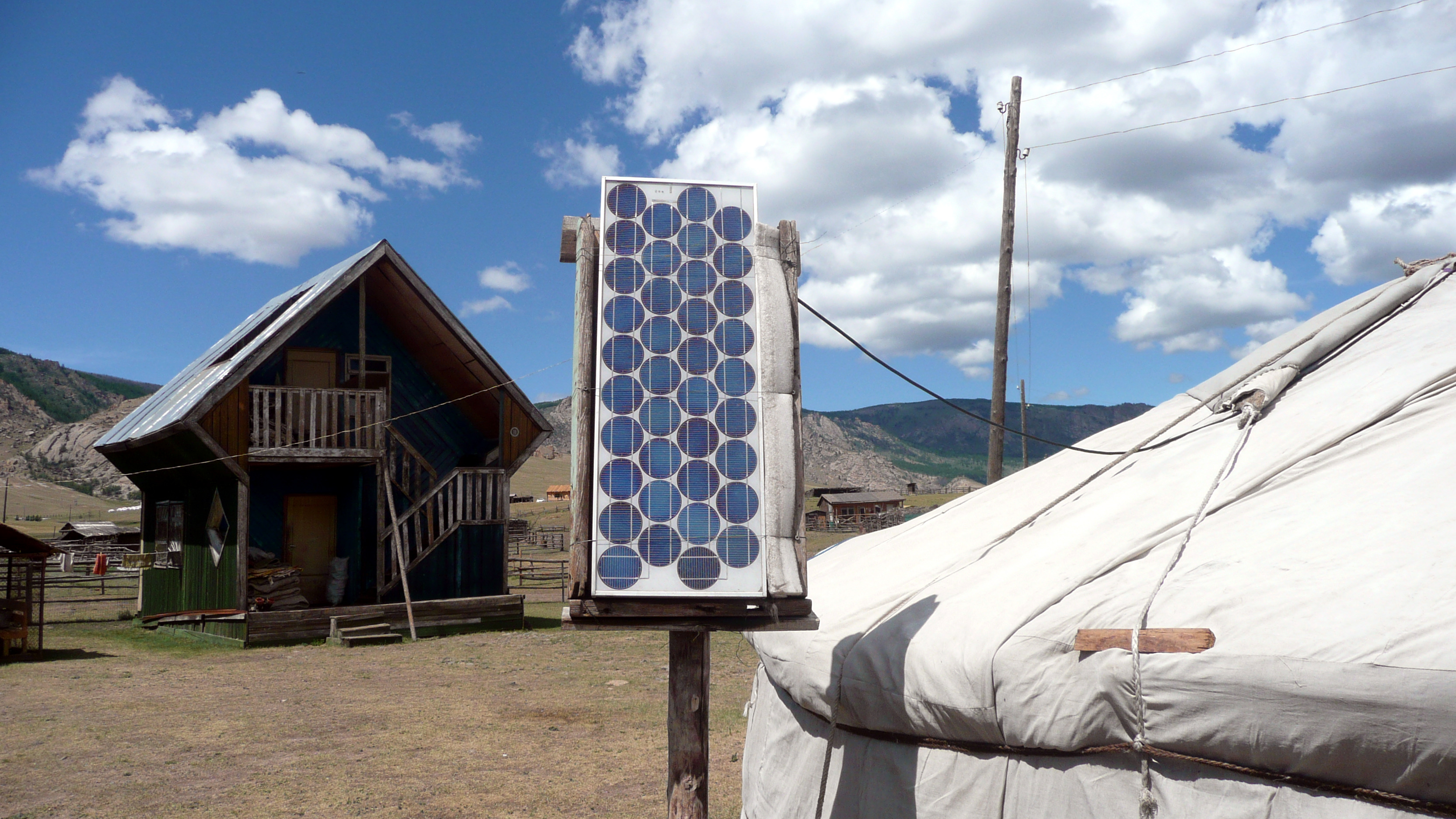
Powering a Yurt in Mongolia

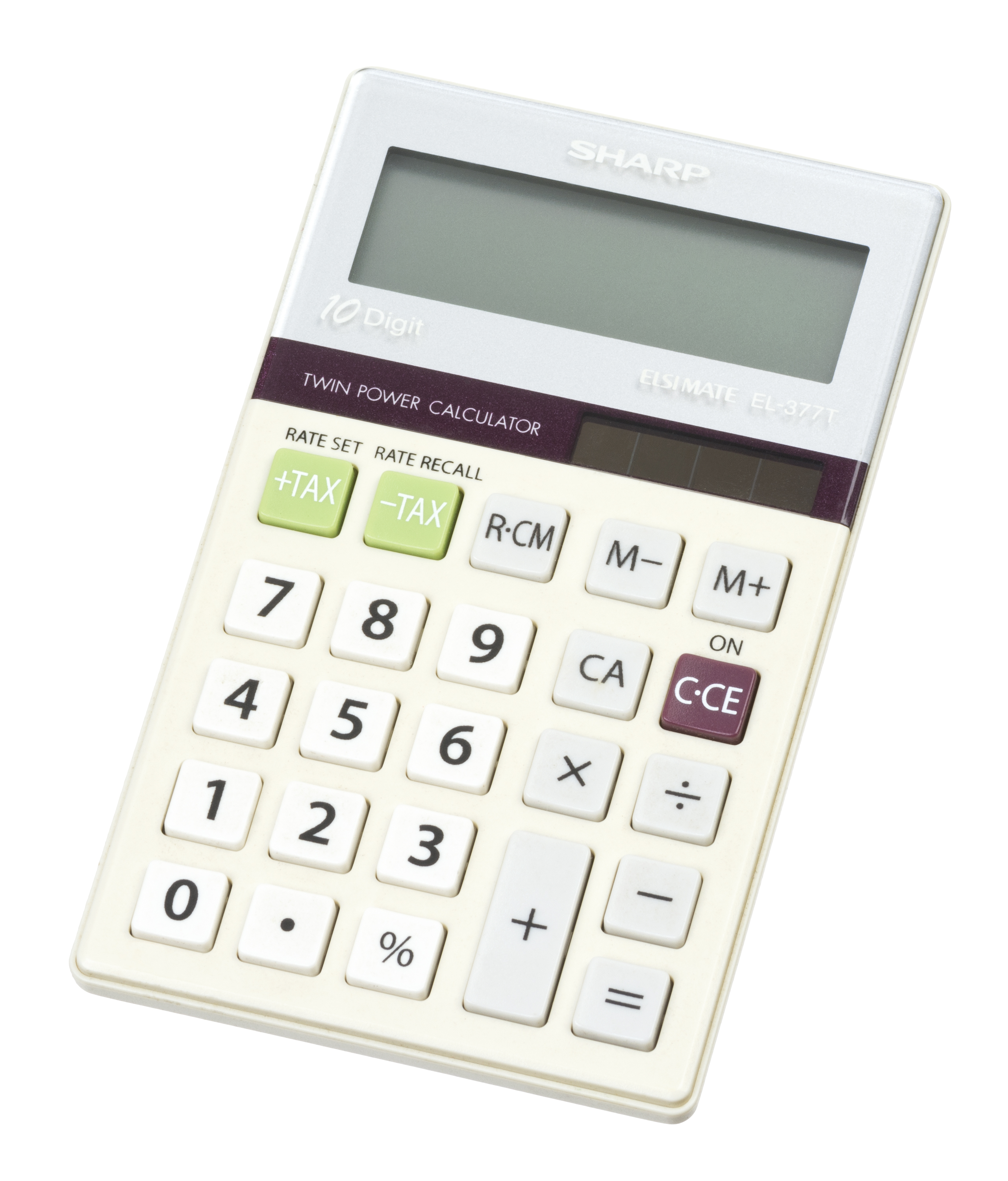
A solar calculator

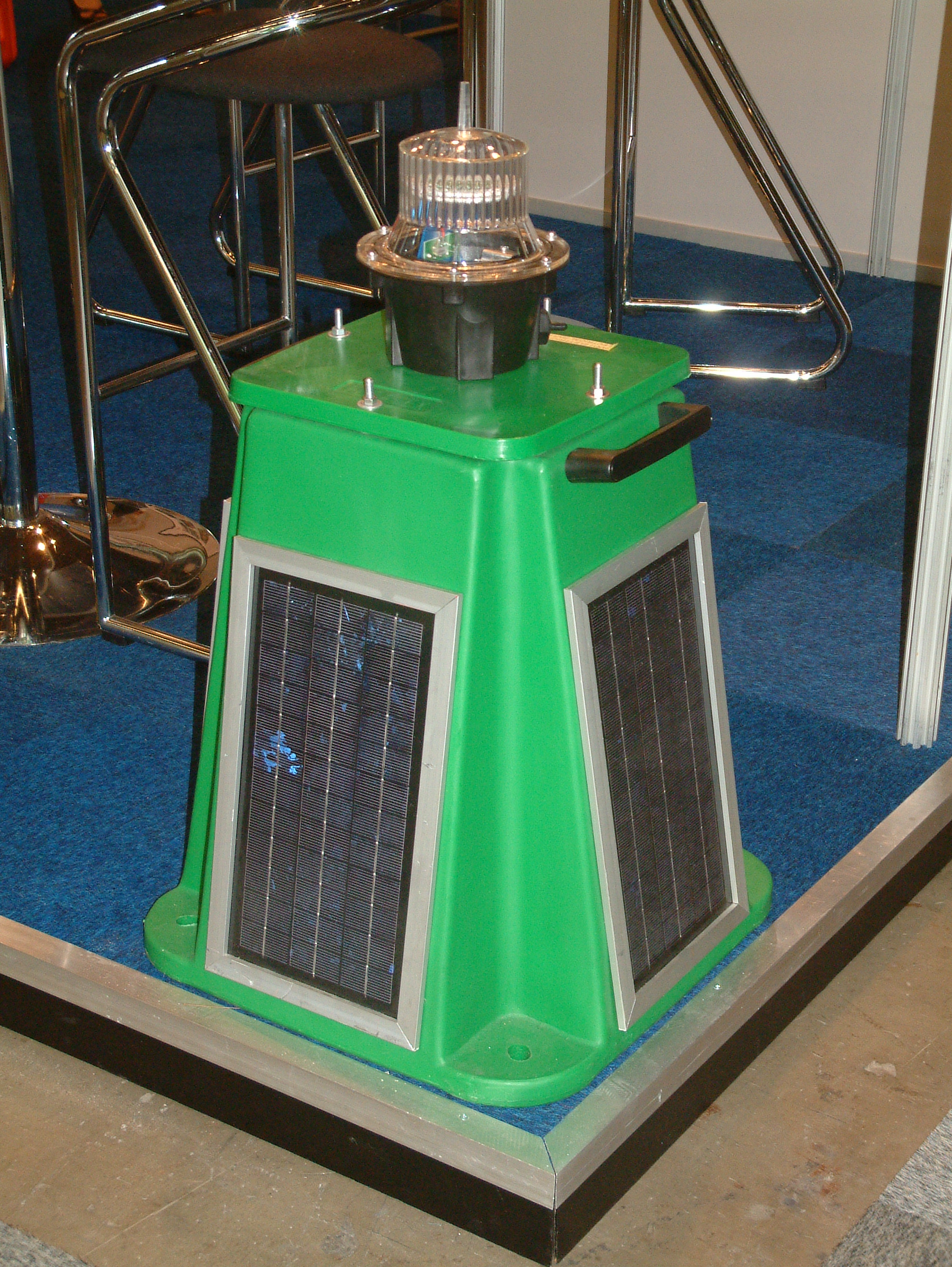
A solar navigation light

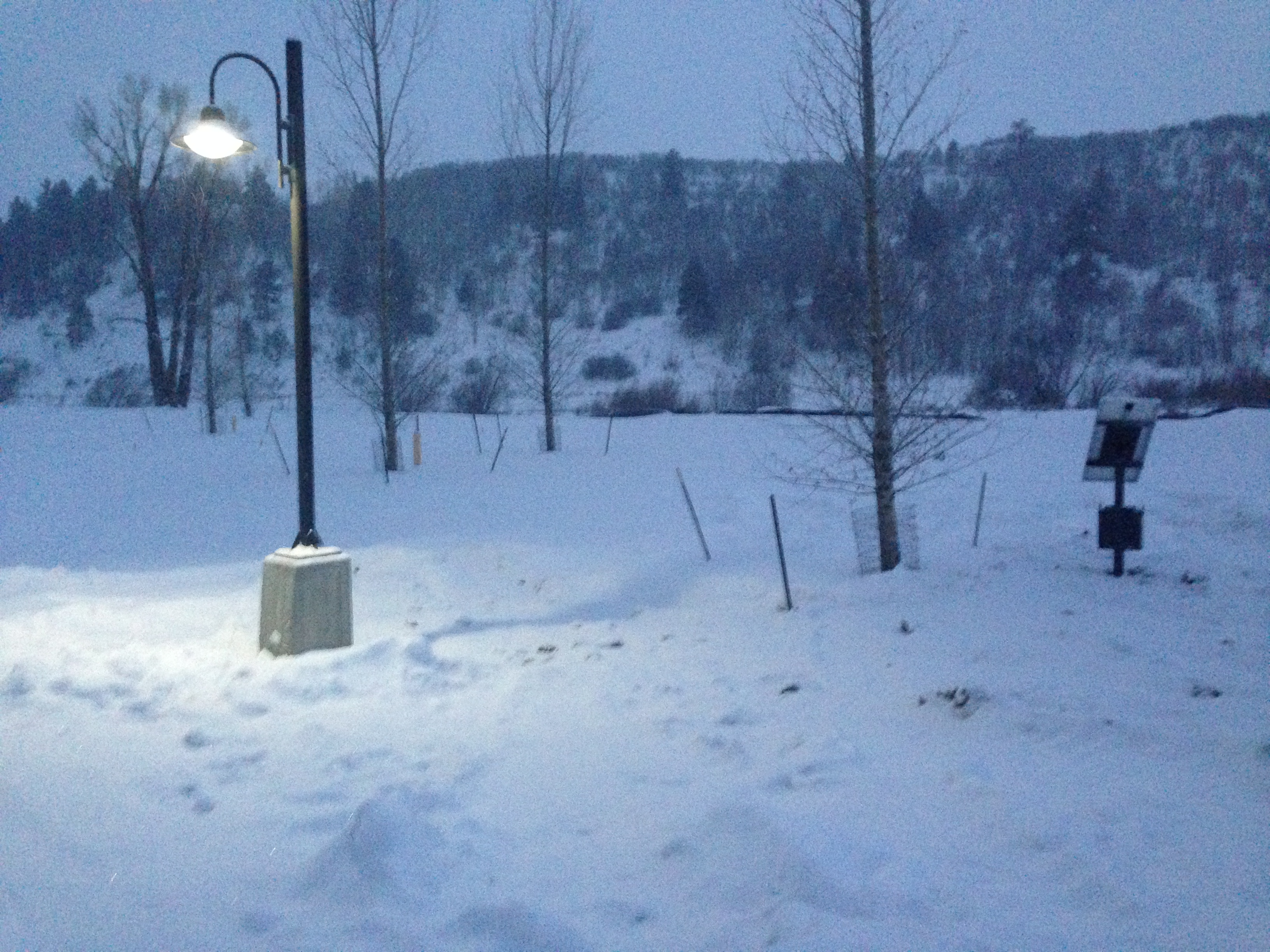
Solar pathway lighting in winter (Steamboat Springs, US)

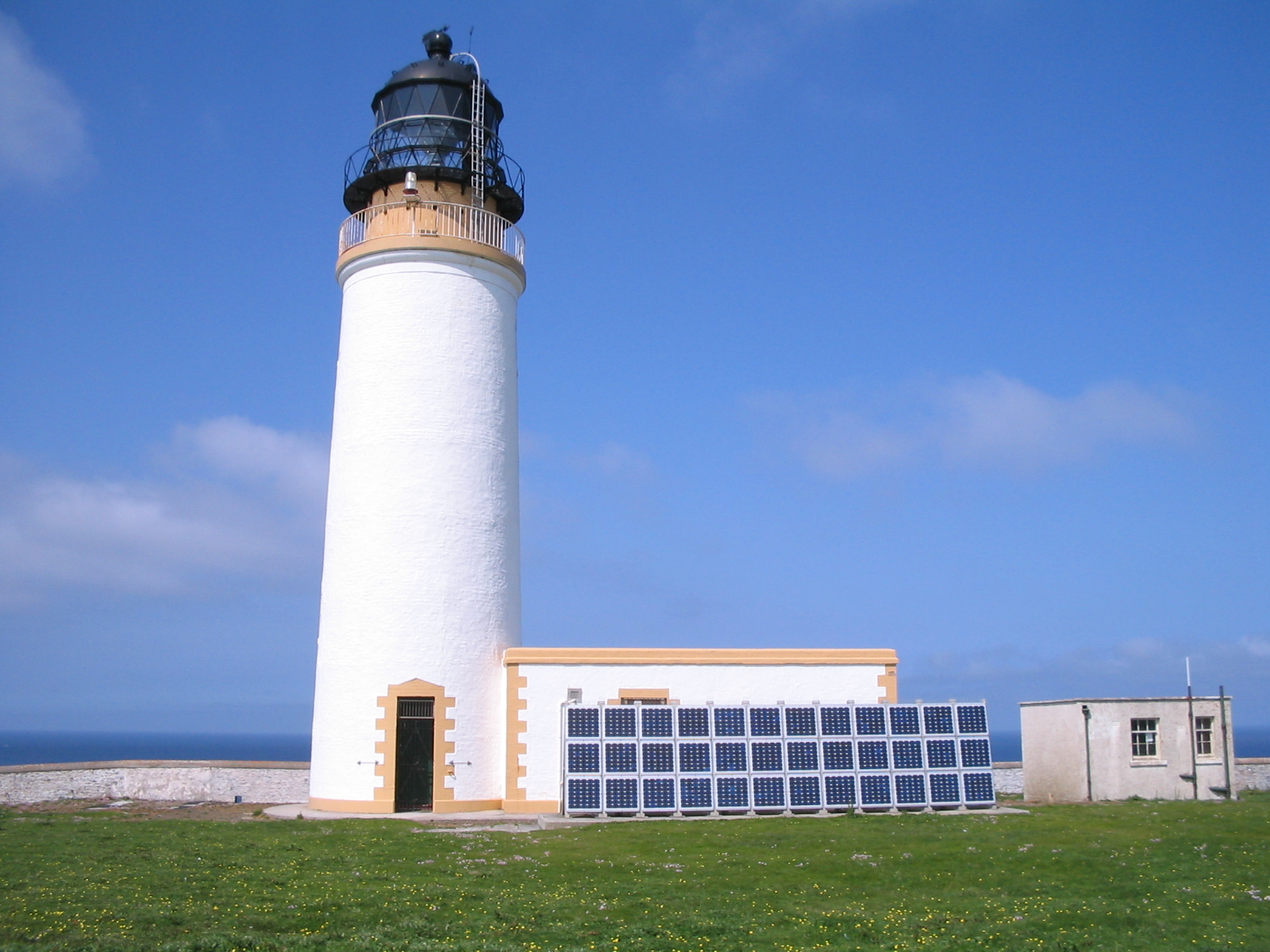
Solar powered lighthouse in Scotland

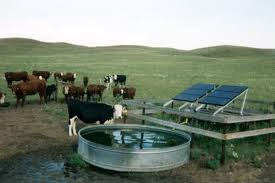
A small solar water pump system

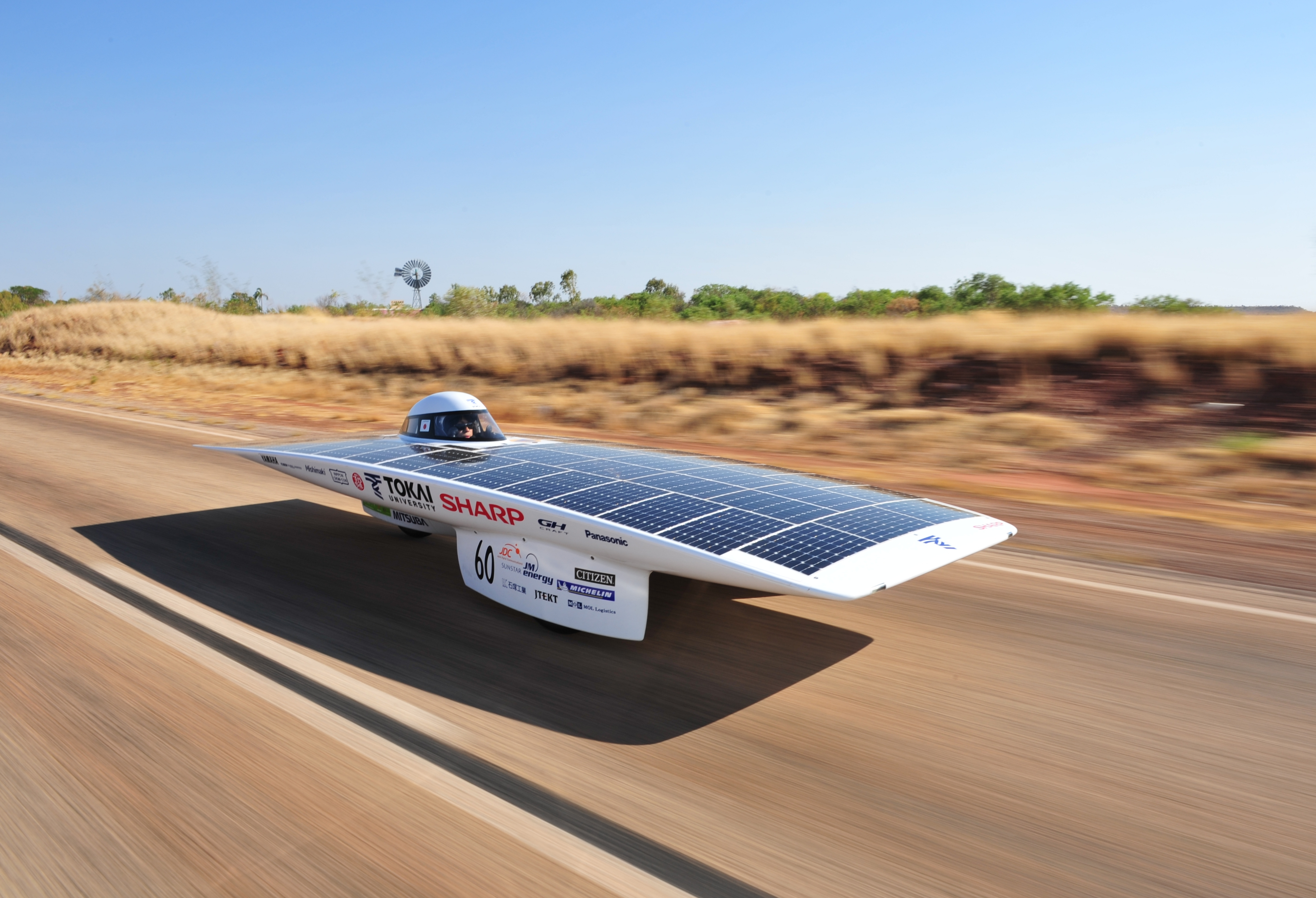
Solar car. The Japanese winner of 2009 World Solar Challenge in Australia

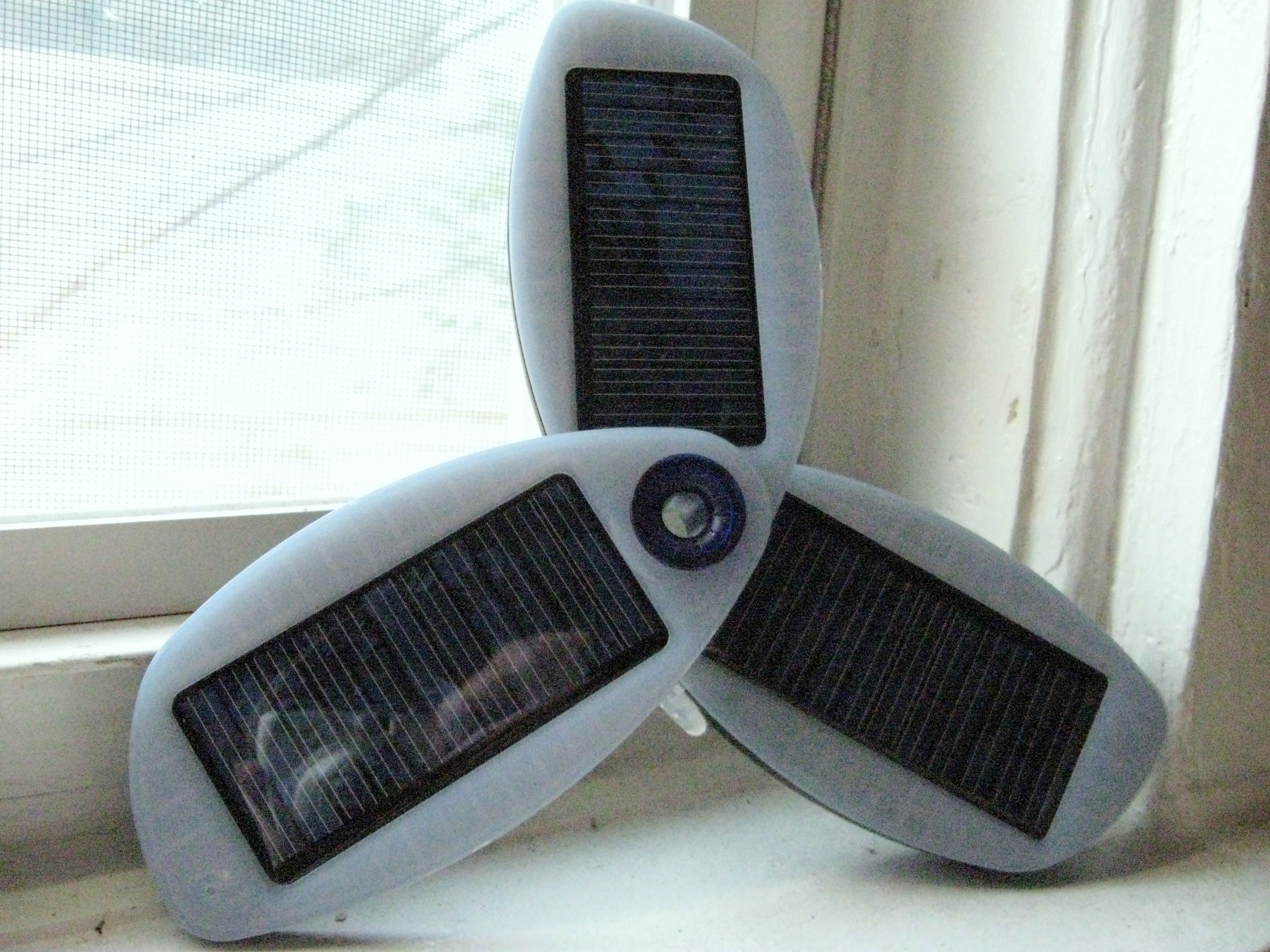
A solar cell phone charger

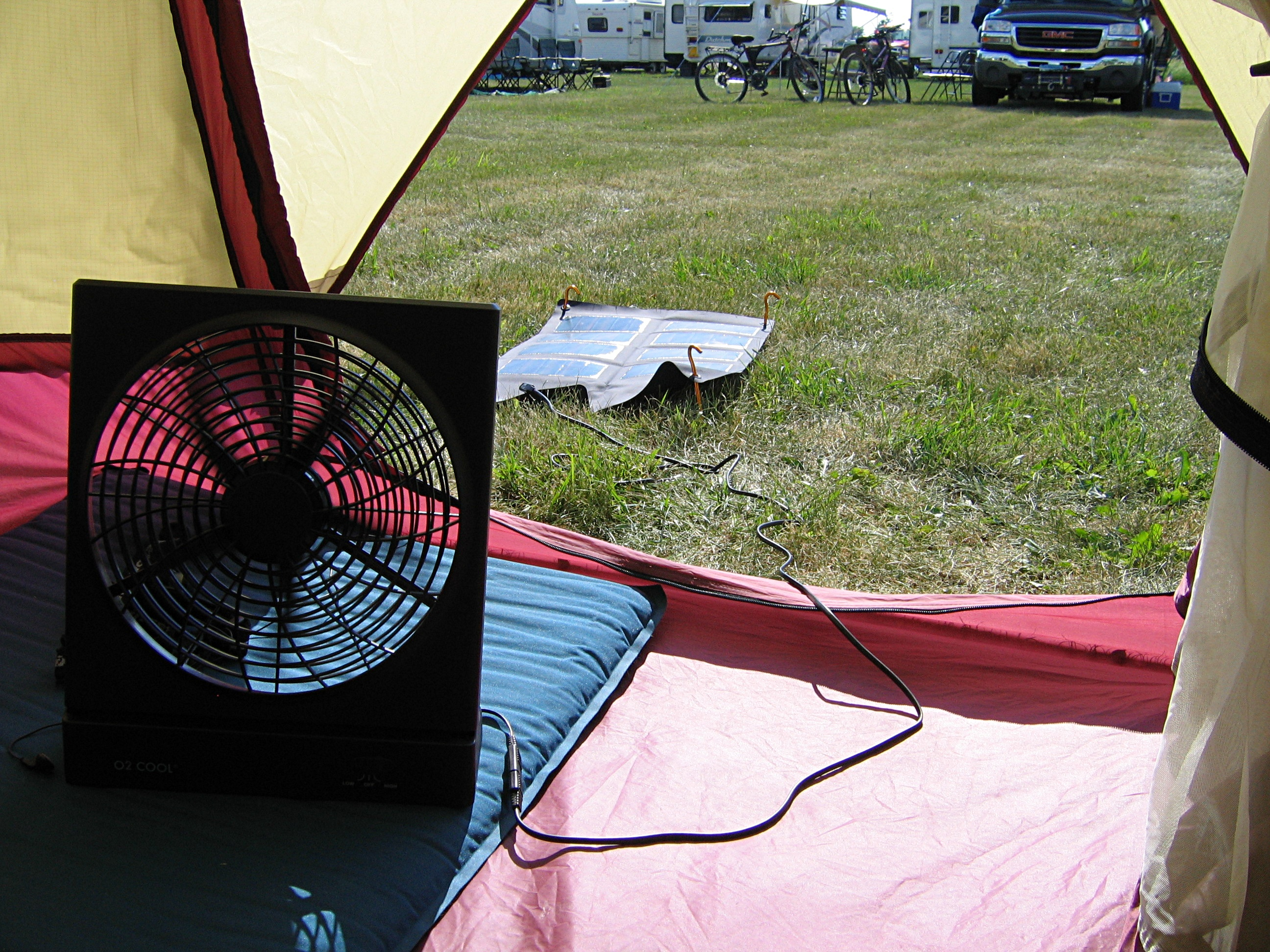
A solar-powered fan

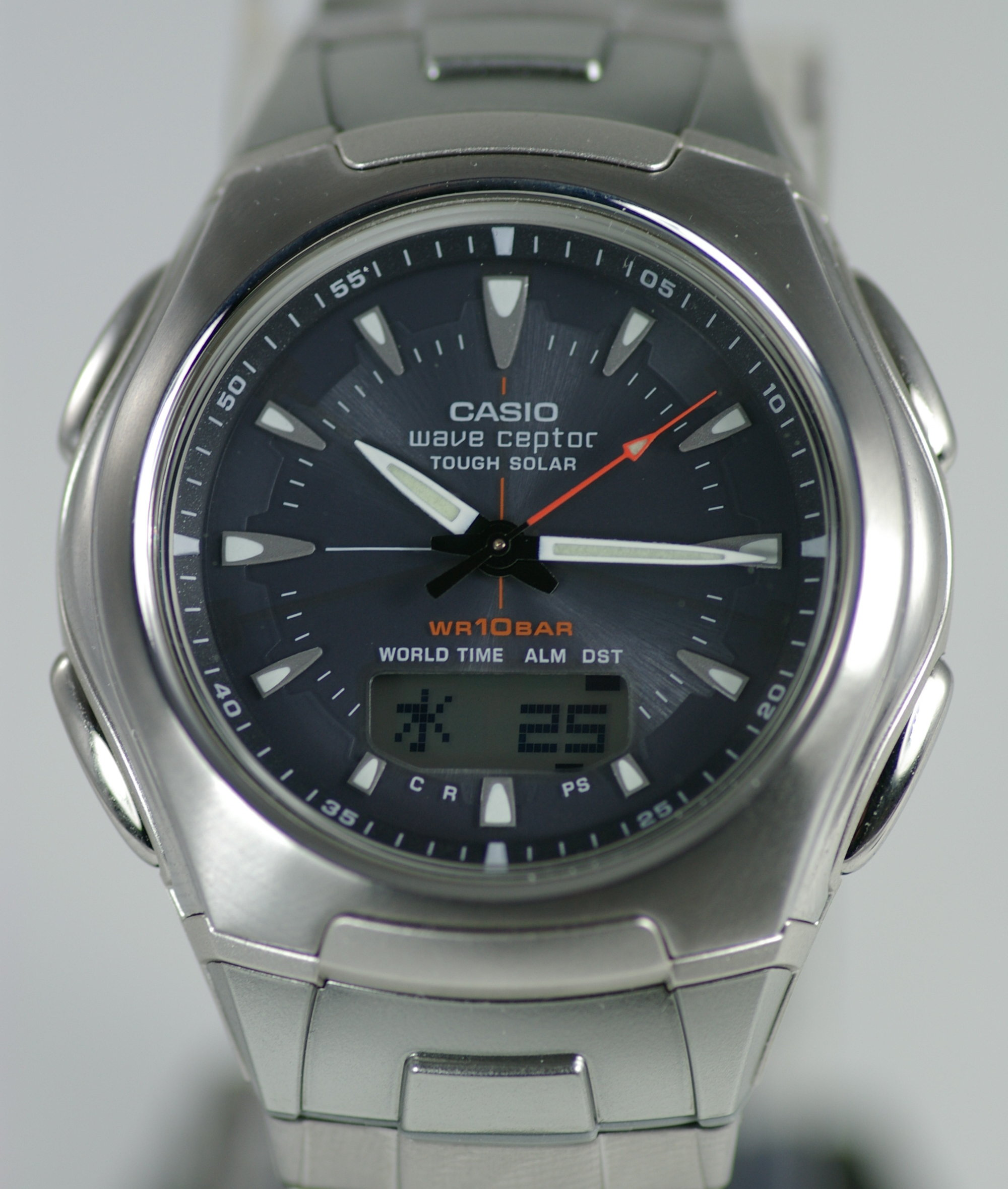
Solar powered watch

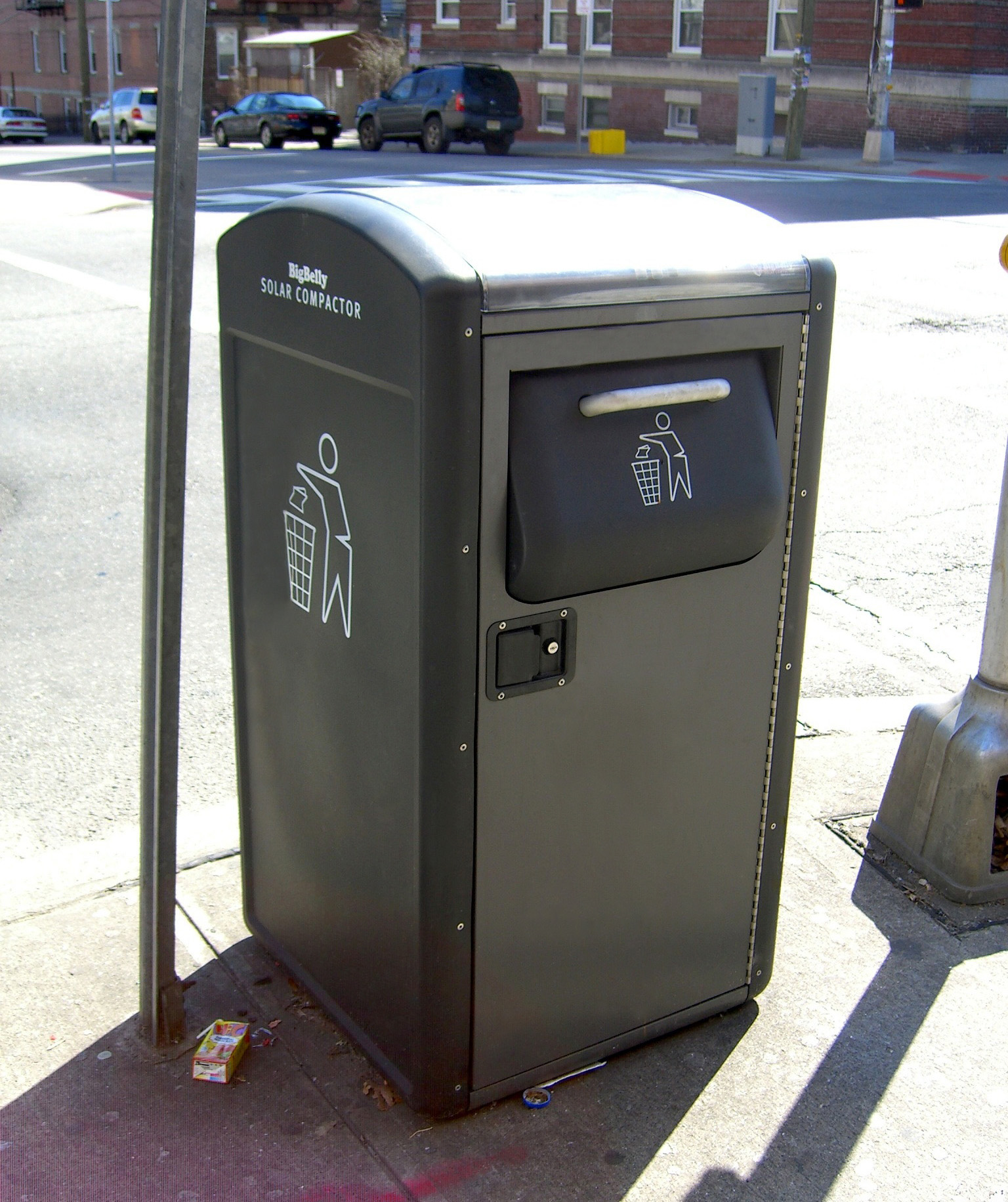
A solar-powered trash compactor, Jersey City, U.S.

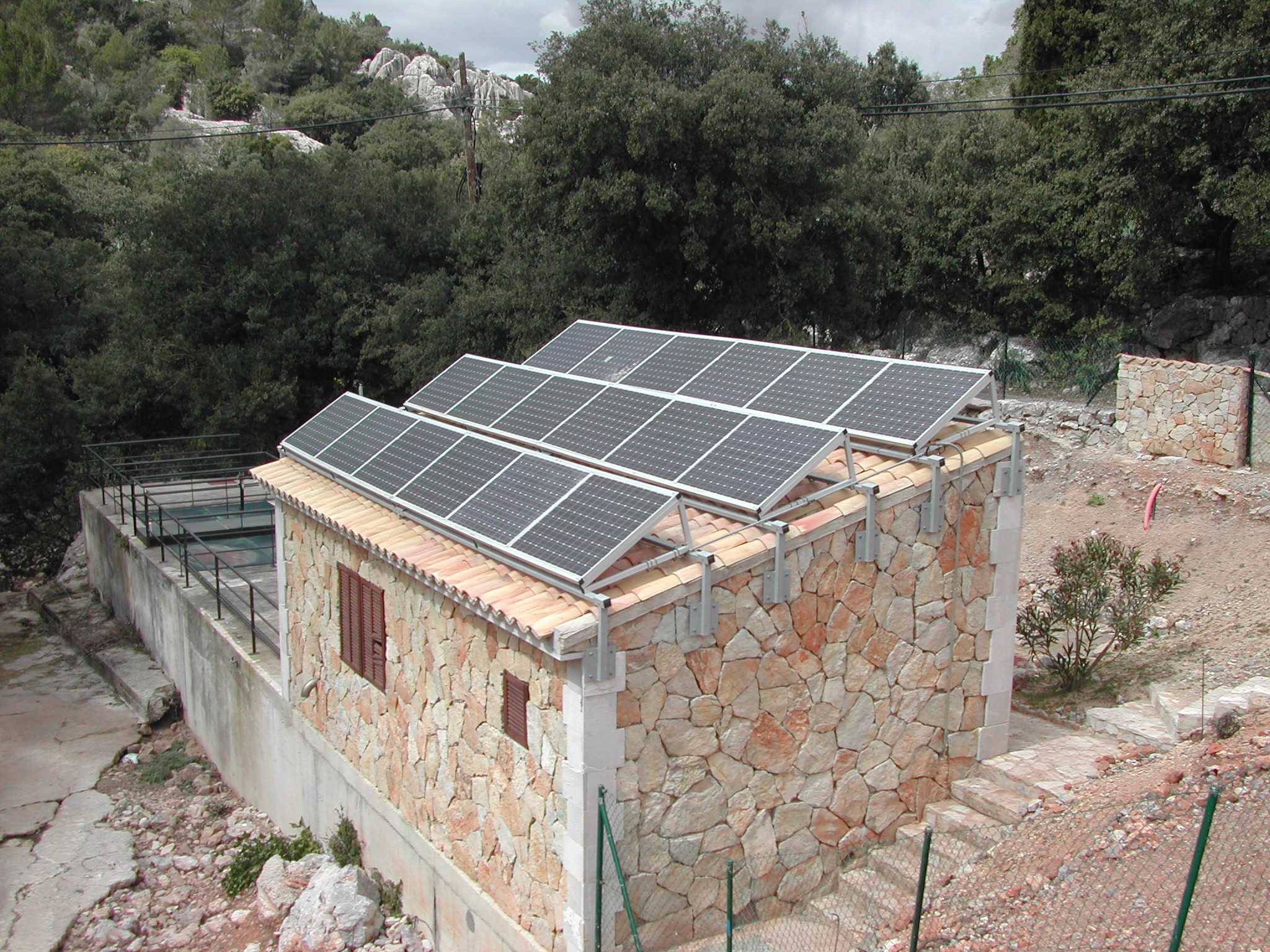
A solar sewage treatment plant in Santuari de Lluc, Spain

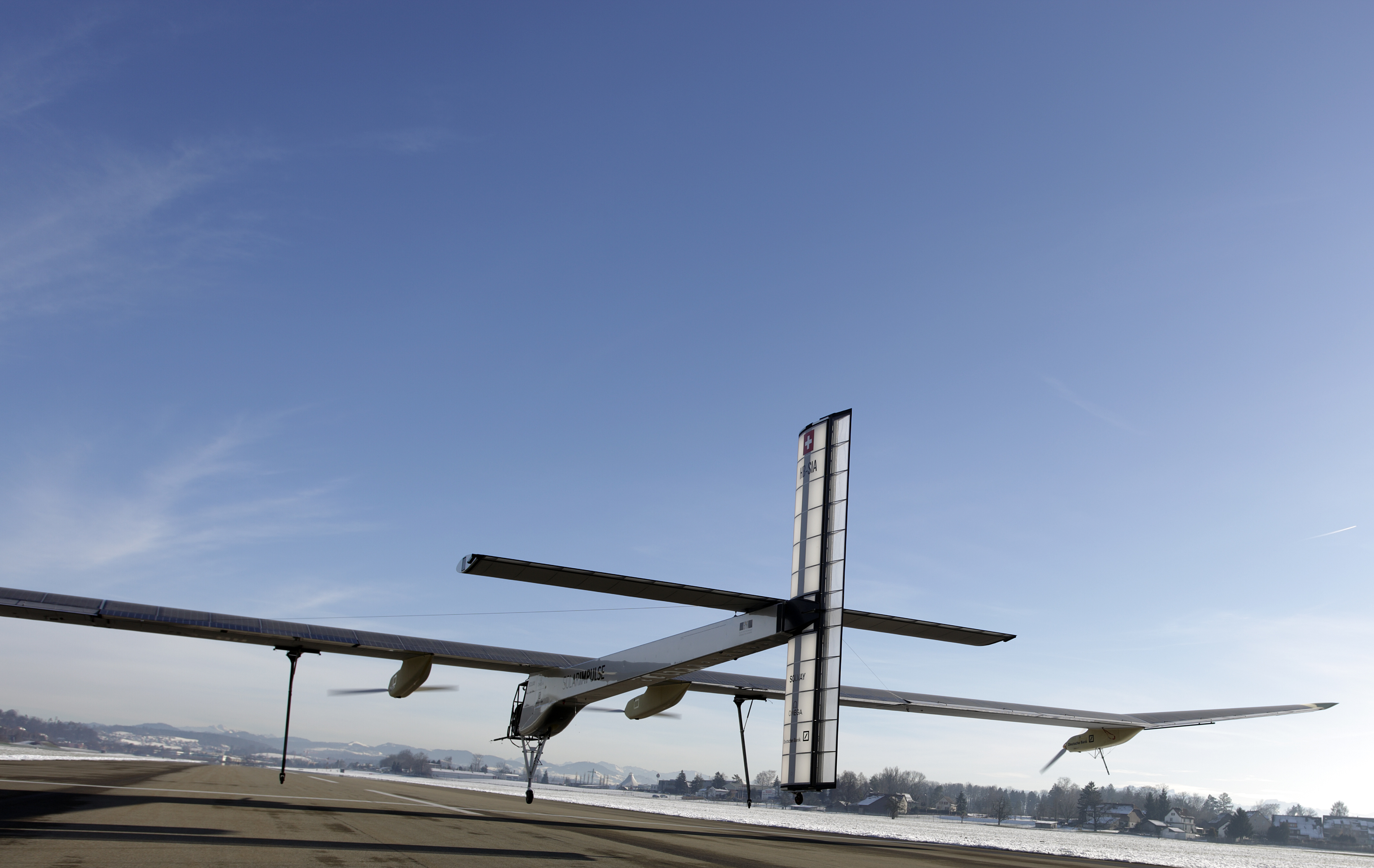
Solar Impulse, an electric aircraft

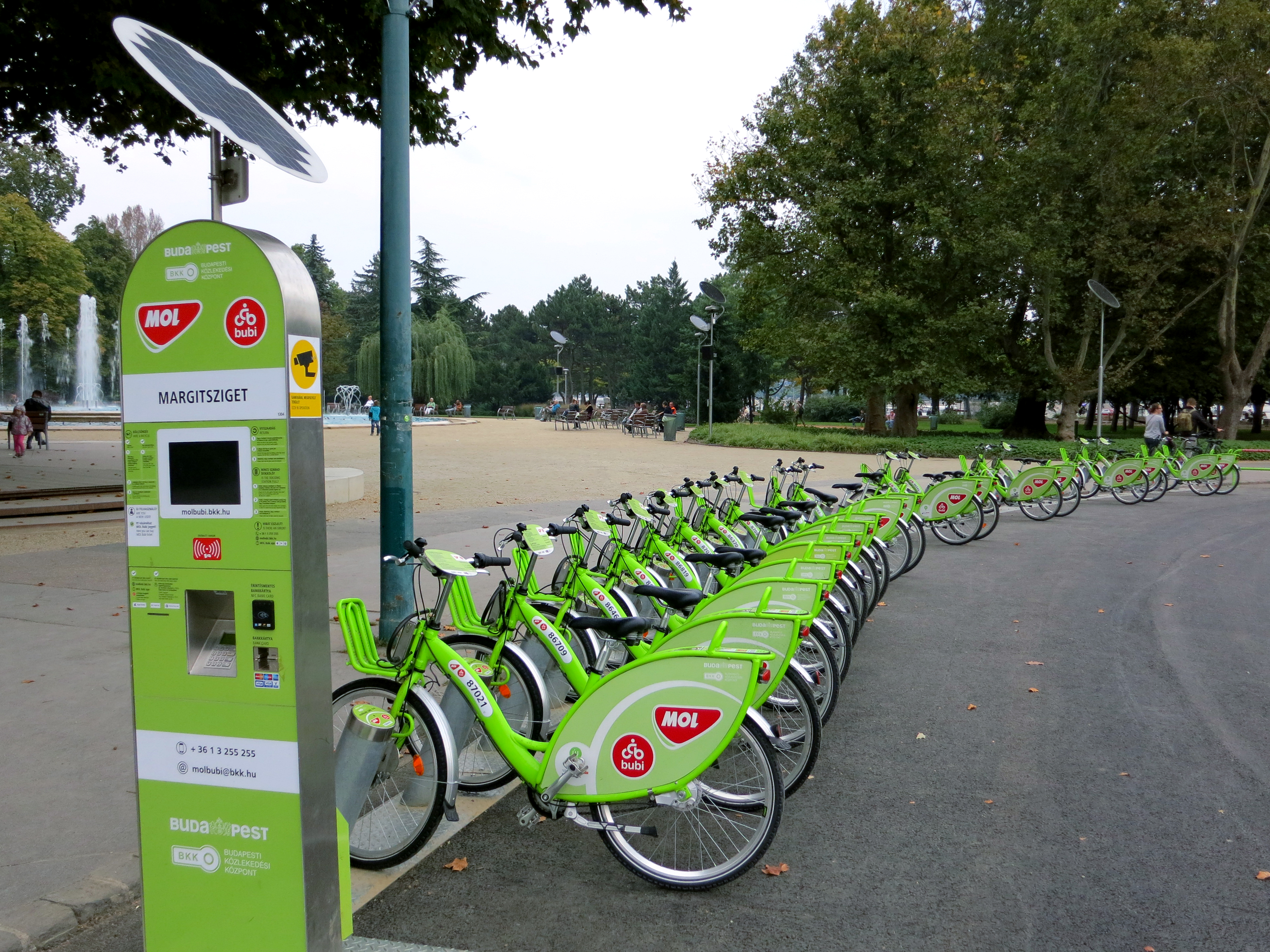
Rental station for shared bicycles, Budapest, Hungary
