= Combustion =

Chemical reaction between a fuel and oxygen

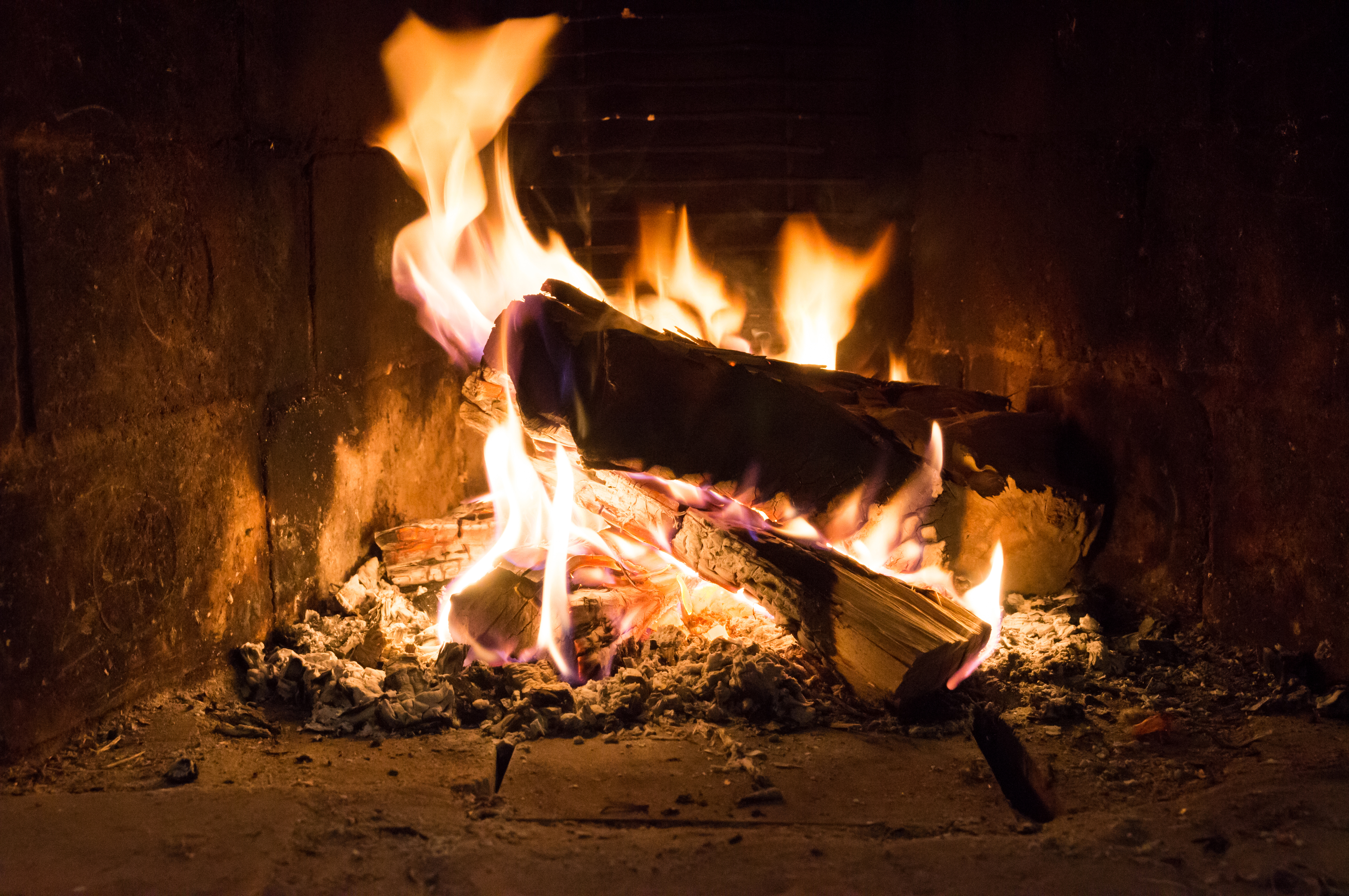
The flames caused as a result of a fuel undergoing combustion (burning)

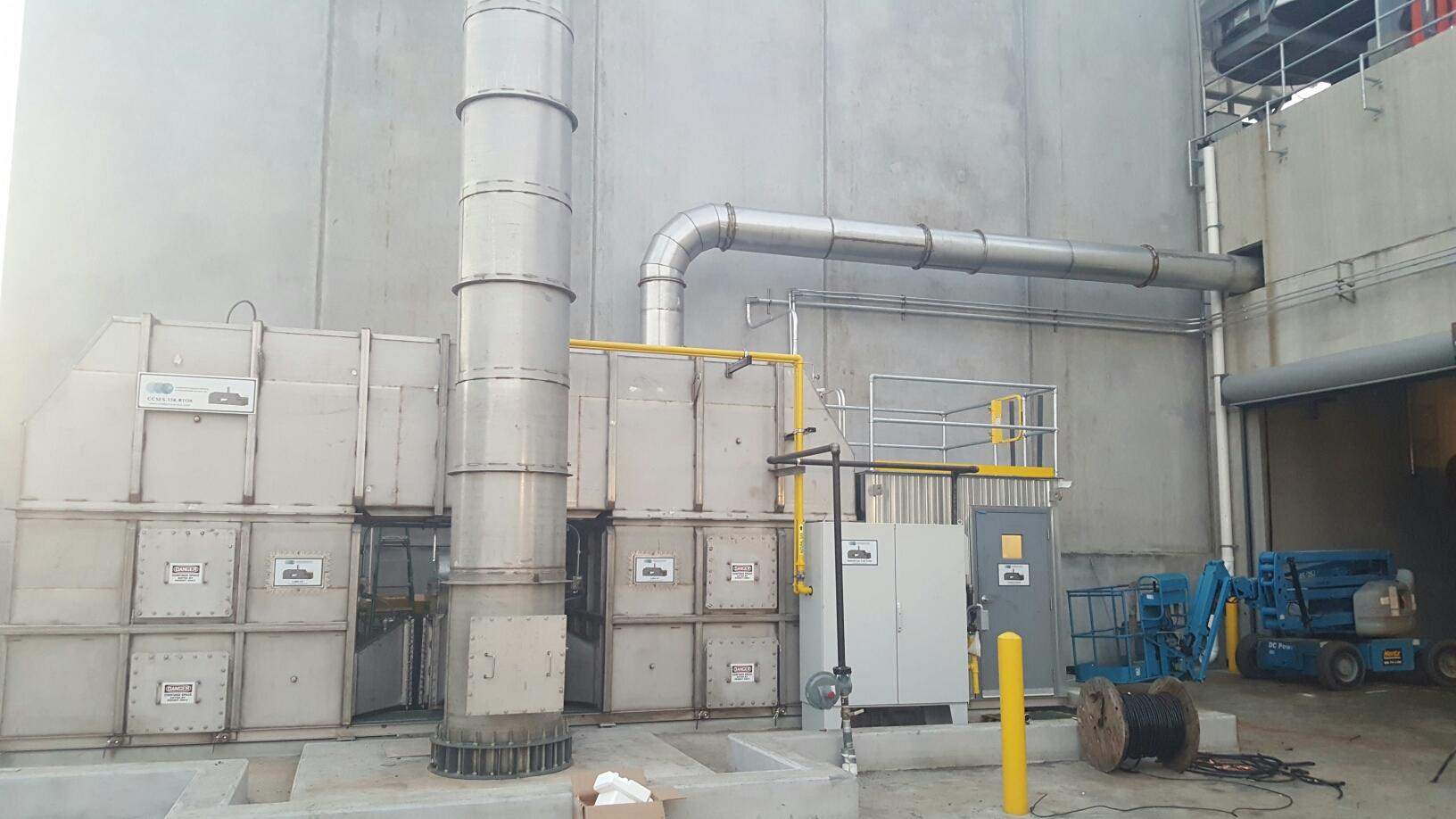
Air pollution abatement equipment provides combustion control for industrial processes.

Combustion, or burning, is a high-temperature exothermic redox chemical reaction between a fuel (the reductant) and an oxidant, usually atmospheric oxygen, that produces oxidized, often gaseous products, in a mixture termed as smoke. Combustion does not always result in fire, because a flame is only visible when substances undergoing combustion vaporize, but when it does, a flame is a characteristic indicator of the reaction. While activation energy must be supplied to initiate combustion (e.g., using a lit match to light a fire), the heat from a flame may provide enough energy to make the reaction self-sustaining. The study of combustion is known as combustion science.

Combustion is often a complicated sequence of elementary radical reactions. Solid fuels, such as wood and coal, first undergo endothermic pyrolysis to produce gaseous fuels whose combustion then supplies the heat required to produce more of them. Combustion is often hot enough that incandescent light in the form of either glowing or a flame is produced. A simple example can be seen in the combustion of hydrogen and oxygen into water vapor, a reaction which is commonly used to fuel rocket engines. This reaction releases 242 kJ/mol of heat and reduces the enthalpy accordingly (at constant temperature and pressure):

$$\ce{2H_2(g){+}O_2(g)\rightarrow 2H_2O\uparrow}$$

Uncatalyzed combustion in air requires relatively high temperatures. Complete combustion is stoichiometric concerning the fuel, where there is no remaining fuel, and ideally, no residual oxidant. Thermodynamically, the chemical equilibrium of combustion in air is overwhelmingly on the side of the products. However, complete combustion is almost impossible to achieve, since the chemical equilibrium is not necessarily reached, or may contain unburnt products such as carbon monoxide, hydrogen and even carbon (soot or ash). Thus, the produced smoke is usually toxic and contains unburned or partially oxidized products. Any combustion at high temperatures in atmospheric air, which is 78 percent nitrogen, will also create small amounts of several nitrogen oxides, commonly referred to as NOx, since the combustion of nitrogen is thermodynamically favored at high, but not low temperatures. Since burning is rarely clean, fuel gas cleaning or catalytic converters may be required by law.

Fires occur naturally, ignited by lightning strikes or by volcanic products. Combustion (fire) was the first controlled chemical reaction discovered by humans, in the form of campfires and bonfires, and continues to be the main method to produce energy for humanity. Usually, the fuel is hydrogen, hydrocarbons (a compound with a mixture of hydrogen and carbon), or more complicated mixtures such as wood that contain partially oxidized hydrocarbons. The thermal energy produced from the combustion of either fossil fuels such as coal or oil, or from renewable fuels such as firewood, is harvested for diverse uses such as cooking, production of electricity or industrial or domestic heating. Combustion is also currently the only reaction used to power rockets. Combustion is also used to destroy (incinerate) waste, both nonhazardous and hazardous.

Oxidants for combustion have high oxidation potential and include atmospheric or pure oxygen, chlorine, fluorine, chlorine trifluoride, nitrous oxide and nitric acid. For instance, hydrogen burns in chlorine to form hydrogen chloride with the liberation of heat and light characteristic of combustion. Although usually not catalyzed, combustion can be catalyzed by platinum or vanadium, as in the contact process.

== Types ==
=== Complete and incomplete ===
==== Complete ====
The combustion of methane, a hydrocarbon

In complete combustion, the reactant burns in oxygen and produces a limited number of products. When a hydrocarbon burns in oxygen, the reaction will primarily yield carbon dioxide and water. When elements are burned, the products are primarily the most common oxides. Carbon will yield carbon dioxide, sulfur will yield sulfur dioxide, and iron will yield iron(III) oxide. Nitrogen is not considered to be a combustible substance when oxygen is the oxidant. Still, small amounts of various nitrogen oxides (commonly designated NO_{x} species) form when the air is the oxidative.

Combustion is not necessarily favorable to the maximum degree of oxidation, and it can be temperature-dependent. For example, sulfur trioxide is not produced quantitatively by the combustion of sulfur. NO_{x} species appear in significant amounts above about 2,800 °F (1,540 °C), and more is produced at higher temperatures. The amount of NO_{x} is also a function of oxygen excess.

In most industrial applications and in fires, air is the source of oxygen (O_{2}). In the air, each mole of oxygen is mixed with approximately 3.71 mol of nitrogen. Nitrogen does not take part in combustion, but at high temperatures, some nitrogen will be converted to NO_{x} (mostly NO, with much smaller amounts of NO_{2}). On the other hand, when there is insufficient oxygen to combust the fuel completely, some fuel carbon is converted to carbon monoxide, and some of the hydrogens remain unreacted. A complete set of equations for the combustion of a hydrocarbon in the air, therefore, requires an additional calculation for the distribution of oxygen between the carbon and hydrogen in the fuel.

The amount of air required for complete combustion is known as the "theoretical air" or "stoichiometric air". The amount of air above this value actually needed for optimal combustion is known as the "excess air", and can vary from 5% for a natural gas boiler, to 40% for anthracite coal, to 300% for a gas turbine.

==== Incomplete ====
Incomplete combustion will occur when there is not enough oxygen to allow the fuel to react completely to produce carbon dioxide and water. It also happens when the combustion is quenched by a heat sink, such as a solid surface or flame trap. As is the case with complete combustion, water is produced by incomplete combustion; however, carbon and carbon monoxide are produced instead of carbon dioxide.

For most fuels, such as diesel oil, coal, or wood, pyrolysis occurs before combustion. In incomplete combustion, products of pyrolysis remain unburnt and contaminate the smoke with noxious particulate matter and gases. Partially oxidized compounds are also a concern; partial oxidation of ethanol can produce harmful acetaldehyde, and carbon can produce toxic carbon monoxide.

The designs of combustion devices can improve the quality of combustion, such as burners and internal combustion engines. Further improvements are achievable by catalytic after-burning devices (such as catalytic converters) or by the simple partial return of the exhaust gases into the combustion process. Such devices are required by environmental legislation for cars in most countries. They may be necessary to enable large combustion devices, such as thermal power stations, to reach legal emission standards.

The degree of combustion can be measured and analyzed with test equipment. HVAC contractors, firefighters and engineers use combustion analyzers to test the efficiency of a burner during the combustion process. Also, the efficiency of an internal combustion engine can be measured in this way, and some U.S. states and local municipalities use combustion analysis to define and rate the efficiency of vehicles on the road today.

Carbon monoxide is one of the products from incomplete combustion. The formation of carbon monoxide produces less heat than formation of carbon dioxide so complete combustion is greatly preferred especially as carbon monoxide is a poisonous gas. When breathed, carbon monoxide takes the place of oxygen and combines with some of the hemoglobin in the blood, rendering it unable to transport oxygen.

==== Problems associated with incomplete combustion ====
===== Environmental problems =====
These oxides combine with water and oxygen in the atmosphere, creating nitric acid and sulfuric acids, which return to Earth's surface as acid deposition, or "acid rain". Acid deposition harms aquatic organisms and kills trees. Due to its formation of certain nutrients that are less available to plants such as calcium and phosphorus, it reduces the productivity of the ecosystem and farms. An additional problem associated with nitrogen oxides is that they, along with hydrocarbon pollutants, contribute to the formation of ground level ozone, a major component of smog.

===== Human health problems =====
Breathing carbon monoxide causes headache, dizziness, vomiting, and nausea. If carbon monoxide levels are high enough, humans become unconscious or die. Exposure to moderate and high levels of carbon monoxide over long periods is positively correlated with the risk of heart disease. People who survive severe carbon monoxide poisoning may suffer long-term health problems. Carbon monoxide from the air is absorbed in the lungs which then binds with hemoglobin in human's red blood cells. This reduces the capacity of red blood cells that carry oxygen throughout the body.

=== Smoldering ===
Smoldering is the slow, low-temperature, flameless form of combustion, sustained by the heat evolved when oxygen directly attacks the surface of a condensed-phase fuel. It is a typically incomplete combustion reaction. Solid materials that can sustain a smoldering reaction include coal, cellulose, wood, cotton, tobacco, peat, duff, humus, synthetic foams, charring polymers (including polyurethane foam) and dust. Common examples of smoldering phenomena are the initiation of residential fires on upholstered furniture by weak heat sources (e.g., a cigarette, a short-circuited wire) and the persistent combustion of biomass behind the flaming fronts of wildfires.

=== Spontaneous ===
Spontaneous combustion is a type of combustion that occurs by self-heating (increase in temperature due to exothermic internal reactions), followed by thermal runaway (self-heating which rapidly accelerates to high temperatures) and finally, ignition. For example, phosphorus self-ignites at room temperature without the application of heat. Organic materials undergoing bacterial composting can generate enough heat to reach the point of combustion.

=== Turbulent ===
Combustion resulting in a turbulent flame is the most used for industrial applications (e.g. gas turbines, gasoline engines, etc.) because the turbulence helps the mixing process between the fuel and oxidizer.

=== Micro-gravity ===
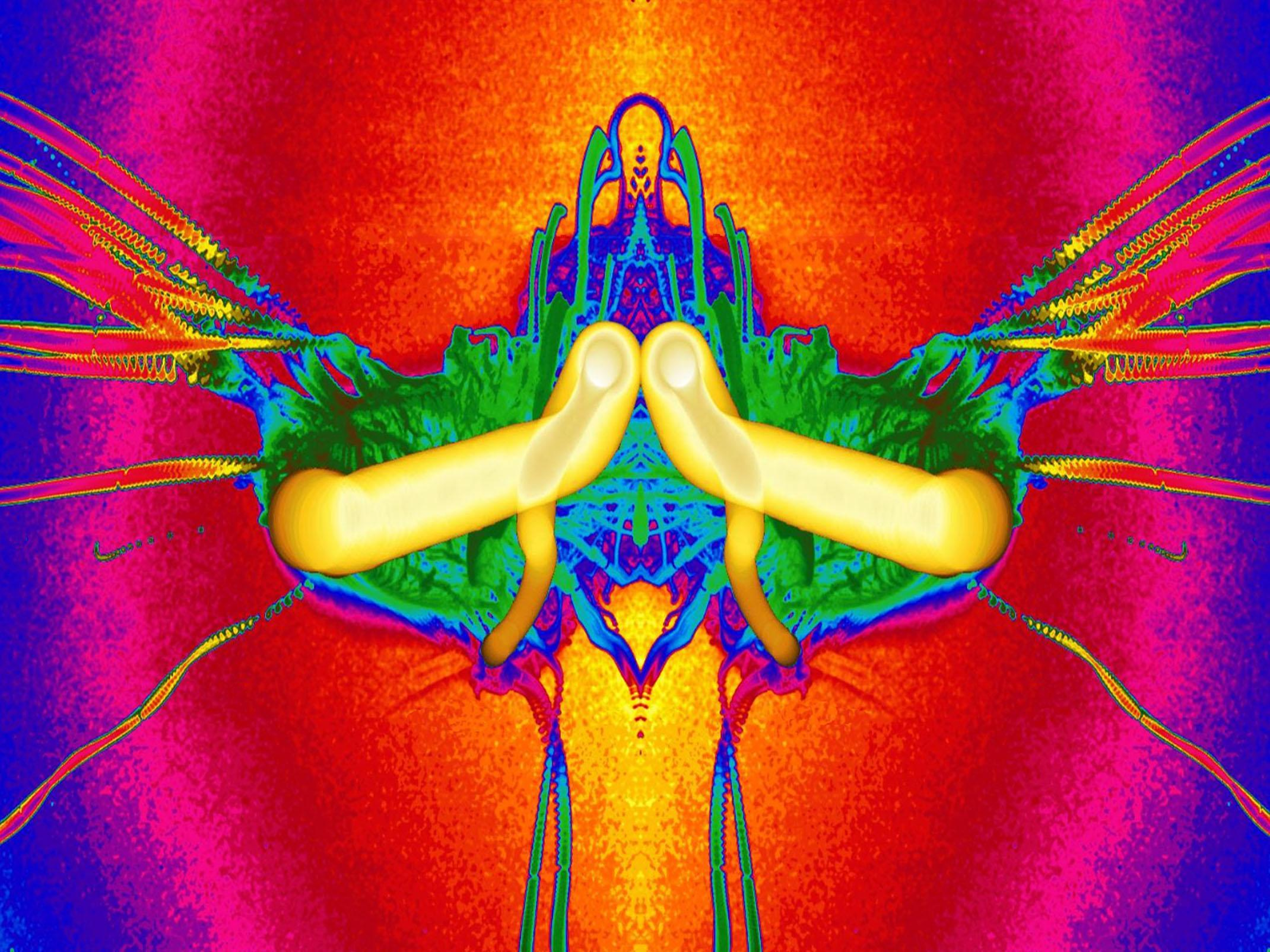
Colourized gray-scale composite image of the individual frames from a video of a backlit fuel droplet burning in microgravity

The term 'micro' gravity refers to a gravitational state that is 'low' (i.e., 'micro' in the sense of 'small' and not necessarily a millionth of Earth's normal gravity) such that the influence of buoyancy on physical processes may be considered small relative to other flow processes that would be present at normal gravity. In such an environment, the thermal and flow transport dynamics can behave quite differently than in normal gravity conditions (e.g., a candle's flame takes the shape of a sphere). Microgravity combustion research contributes to the understanding of a wide variety of aspects that are relevant to both the environment of a spacecraft (e.g., fire dynamics relevant to crew safety on the International Space Station) and terrestrial (Earth-based) conditions (e.g., droplet combustion dynamics to assist developing new fuel blends for improved combustion, materials fabrication processes, thermal management of electronic systems, multiphase flow boiling dynamics, and many others).

=== Micro-combustion ===
Combustion processes that happen in very small volumes are considered micro-combustion. The high surface-to-volume ratio increases specific heat loss. Quenching distance plays a vital role in stabilizing the flame in such combustion chambers.

== Chemical equations ==
=== Stoichiometric combustion of a hydrocarbon in oxygen ===
Generally, the chemical equation for stoichiometric combustion of a hydrocarbon in oxygen is:

$$\ce{C}_x \ce{H}_y + \left(x+{y\over 4}\right)\ce{O2->} x\ce{CO2} + {y\over 2} \ce{H2O}$$

For example, the stoichiometric combustion of methane in oxygen is:

$$\ce{\underset{methane}{CH4} + 2O2 -> CO2 + 2H2O}$$

=== Stoichiometric combustion of a hydrocarbon in air ===
If the stoichiometric combustion takes place using air as the oxygen source, the nitrogen present in the air (Atmosphere of Earth) can be added to the equation (although it does not react) to show the stoichiometric composition of the fuel in air and the composition of the resultant flue gas. Treating all non-oxygen components in air as nitrogen gives a "nitrogen" to oxygen ratio of 3.77, i.e. (100% − O_{2}%) / O_{2}% where O_{2}% is 20.95% vol:

$$\ce{C}_x \ce{H}_y + z\ce{O2} + 3.77z\ce{N2 ->} x\ce{CO2} + {y\over 2} \ce{H2O} + 3.77z\ce{N2}$$

where $z = x + {y\over 4}$.

For example, the stoichiometric combustion of methane in air is:

$$\ce{\underset{methane}{CH4} + 2O2} + 7.54\ce{N2-> CO2 + 2H2O} + 7.54\ce{N2}$$

The stoichiometric composition of methane in air is 1 / (1 + 2 + 7.54) = 9.49% vol.

The stoichiometric combustion reaction for C_{α}H_{β}O_{γ} in air:

$$\ce{C_\mathit{\alpha}H_\mathit{\beta}O_\mathit{\gamma}} + \left ( \alpha + \frac{\beta}{4} -\frac{\gamma}{2} \right ) \left ( \ce{O_2} + 3.77 \ce{N_2} \right ) \longrightarrow \alpha \ce{CO_2} + \frac{\beta}{2} \ce{H_2O} + 3.77 \left ( \alpha + \frac{\beta}{4} -\frac{\gamma}{2} \right ) \ce{N_2}$$

The stoichiometric combustion reaction for C_{α}H_{β}O_{γ}S_{δ}:

$$\ce{C_\mathit{\alpha}H_\mathit{\beta}O_\mathit{\gamma}S_\mathit{\delta}} + \left ( \alpha + \frac{\beta}{4} -\frac{\gamma}{2} + \delta \right ) \left ( \ce{O_2} + 3.77 \ce{N_2} \right ) \longrightarrow \alpha \ce{CO_2} + \frac{\beta}{2} \ce{H_2O} + \delta \ce{SO_2} + 3.77 \left ( \alpha + \frac{\beta}{4} -\frac{\gamma}{2} + \delta \right ) \ce{N_2}$$

The stoichiometric combustion reaction for C_{α}H_{β}O_{γ}N_{δ}S_{ε}:

$$\ce{C_\mathit{\alpha}H_\mathit{\beta}O_\mathit{\gamma}N_\mathit{\delta}S_\mathit{\epsilon}} + \left ( \alpha + \frac{\beta}{4} -\frac{\gamma}{2} + \epsilon \right ) \left ( \ce{O_2} + 3.77 \ce{N_2} \right ) \longrightarrow \alpha \ce{CO_2} + \frac{\beta}{2} \ce{H_2O} + \epsilon \ce{SO_2} + \left ( 3.77 \left ( \alpha + \frac{\beta}{4} -\frac{\gamma}{2} + \epsilon \right ) + \frac{\delta}{2} \right ) \ce{N_2}$$

The stoichiometric combustion reaction for C_{α}H_{β}O_{γ}F_{δ}:

$$\ce{C_\mathit{\alpha}H_\mathit{\beta}O_\mathit{\gamma}F_\mathit{\delta}} + \left ( \alpha + \frac{\beta-\delta}{4} -\frac{\gamma}{2} \right ) \left ( \ce{O_2} + 3.77 \ce{N_2} \right ) \longrightarrow \alpha \ce{CO_2} + \frac{\beta-\delta}{2} \ce{H_2O} + \delta \ce{HF} + 3.77 \left ( \alpha + \frac{\beta-\delta}{4} -\frac{\gamma}{2} \right ) \ce{N_2}$$

=== Trace combustion products ===
Various other substances begin to appear in significant amounts in combustion products when the flame temperature is above about 1600 K. When excess air is used, nitrogen may oxidize to NO and, to a much lesser extent, to NO_{2}. CO forms by disproportionation of CO_{2}, and H_{2} and OH form by disproportionation of H_{2}O.

For example, when 1 mol of propane is burned with 28.6 mol of air (120% of the stoichiometric amount), the combustion products contain 3.3% O_{2}. At 1400 K, the equilibrium combustion products contain 0.03% NO and 0.002% OH. At 1800 K, the combustion products contain 0.17% NO, 0.05% OH, 0.01% CO, and 0.004% H_{2}.

Diesel engines are run with an excess of oxygen to combust small particles that tend to form with only a stoichiometric amount of oxygen, necessarily producing nitrogen oxide emissions. Both the United States and European Union enforce limits to vehicle nitrogen oxide emissions, which necessitate the use of special catalytic converters or treatment of the exhaust with urea (see Diesel exhaust fluid).

=== Incomplete combustion of a hydrocarbon in oxygen ===
The incomplete (partial) combustion of a hydrocarbon with oxygen produces a gas mixture containing mainly CO_{2}, CO, H2O, and H_{2}. Such gas mixtures are commonly prepared for use as protective atmospheres for the heat-treatment of metals and for gas carburizing. The composition of the products depends strongly on the fuel-to-oxygen ratio, temperature, pressure, and the position of chemical equilibrium.

In addition to CO_{2}, CO, H2O, and H_{2}, incomplete combustion can produce a wide range of other products. The relative amounts of these species depend on the combustion conditions, and some may occur only in trace concentrations under conditions where the four principal products dominate.

- CH_{4} can become an important product under strongly fuel-rich conditions. It is favoured when there is insufficient oxygen to oxidise all of the carbon-containing species to CO and CO_{2}. Under still more oxygen-deficient conditions, other light hydrocarbons may also become thermodynamically or kinetically significant.
- Elemental carbon (soot or solid carbon) can form when the mixture is sufficiently rich in fuel. Carbon deposition is particularly important in industrial processes because it can alter the surface of metals and can foul or damage furnace equipment. Depending on the temperature and composition, carbon may exist as a stable condensed phase rather than remaining entirely in gaseous species.
- O2 may remain in the product mixture when more oxygen is supplied than can be consumed by the fuel. Its concentration is therefore an important indicator of whether combustion is oxygen-rich or oxygen-deficient.
- Small quantities of OH, atomic O, and atomic H can occur at high temperatures. These species are highly reactive and are generally present in much smaller concentrations than the stable combustion products. Their concentrations increase as the temperature rises because thermal dissociation of stable molecules becomes more significant.
- CH_{4} and other hydrocarbons such as C2H4 and C2H6 may appear when the combustion mixture is strongly fuel-rich. Under sufficiently reducing conditions, more complex hydrocarbons can also be produced, although their concentrations depend strongly on temperature, residence time, and the particular fuel.
- CO2 and H2O can undergo thermal dissociation at sufficiently high temperatures, producing species such as CO, H2, O2, OH, O, and H. Consequently, even when a combustion mixture is initially prepared from only a fuel and oxygen, its high-temperature equilibrium composition can contain substantially more species than the four principal products.
- N2 and nitrogen-containing compounds may also be present when air rather than pure oxygen is used as the oxidant. At sufficiently high temperatures, nitrogen oxides such as NO and NO2 can form through reactions involving atmospheric nitrogen. The presence of nitrogen therefore introduces additional possible equilibrium products that are absent when pure oxygen is used.

The product distribution is therefore not determined solely by the overall stoichiometric combustion equation. Instead, it reflects the competition between many possible oxidation, reduction, dissociation, and recombination reactions. For example, carbon-containing species can be distributed among CO2, CO, CH4, other hydrocarbons, and elemental carbon, while hydrogen can occur predominantly as H2O or H2 depending on the conditions.

The importance of the different products changes systematically with the oxygen-to-fuel ratio. With an excess of oxygen, oxidation is favoured and CO2 and H2O generally dominate. As the oxygen supply is reduced, CO and H2 become increasingly important. Under strongly fuel-rich conditions, CH4, other hydrocarbons, and elemental carbon can become significant. At high temperatures, equilibrium dissociation additionally produces small quantities of reactive species such as H, O, and OH.

Thus, incomplete combustion should not be regarded as producing one fixed set of products. The four commonly observed products—CO2, CO, H2O, and H2—represent only the principal species under a particular range of conditions, while a much larger collection of gaseous and, under sufficiently fuel-rich conditions, solid products may be present.

=== Liquid fuels ===
Combustion of a liquid fuel in an oxidizing atmosphere actually happens in the gas phase. It is the vapor that burns, not the liquid. Therefore, a liquid will normally catch fire only above a certain temperature: its flash point. The flash point of liquid fuel is the lowest temperature at which it can form an ignitable mix with air. It is the minimum temperature at which there is enough evaporated fuel in the air to start combustion.

=== Gaseous fuels ===
Combustion of gaseous fuels may occur through one of four distinctive types of burning: diffusion flame, premixed flame, autoignitive reaction front, or as a detonation. The type of burning that actually occurs depends on the degree to which the fuel and oxidizer are mixed prior to heating: for example, a diffusion flame is formed if the fuel and oxidizer are separated initially, whereas a premixed flame is formed otherwise. Similarly, the type of burning also depends on the pressure: a detonation, for example, is an autoignitive reaction front coupled to a strong shock wave giving it its characteristic high-pressure peak and high detonation velocity.

=== Solid fuels ===
A general scheme of polymer combustion

The act of combustion consists of three relatively distinct but overlapping phases:

- Preheating phase, when the unburned fuel is heated up to its flash point and then fire point. Flammable gases start being evolved in a process similar to dry distillation.
- Distillation phase or gaseous phase, when the mix of evolved flammable gases with oxygen is ignited. Energy is produced in the form of heat and light. Flames are often visible. Heat transfer from the combustion to the solid maintains the evolution of flammable vapours.
- Charcoal phase or solid phase, when the output of flammable gases from the material is too low for the persistent presence of flame and the charred fuel does not burn rapidly and just glows and later only smoulders.

== Combustion management ==
Efficient process heating requires recovery of the largest possible part of a fuel's heat of combustion into the material being processed. There are many avenues of loss in the operation of a heating process. Typically, the dominant loss is sensible heat leaving with the offgas (i.e., the flue gas). The temperature and quantity of offgas indicates its heat content (enthalpy), so keeping its quantity low minimizes heat loss.

In a perfect furnace, the combustion air flow would be matched to the fuel flow to give each fuel molecule the exact amount of oxygen needed to cause complete combustion. However, in the real world, combustion does not proceed in a perfect manner. Unburned fuel (usually CO and H_{2}) discharged from the system represents a heating value loss (as well as a safety hazard). Since combustibles are undesirable in the offgas, while the presence of unreacted oxygen there presents minimal safety and environmental concerns, the first principle of combustion management is to provide more oxygen than is theoretically needed to ensure that all the fuel burns. For methane (CH_{4}) combustion, for example, slightly more than two molecules of oxygen are required.

The second principle of combustion management, however, is to not use too much oxygen. The correct amount of oxygen requires three types of measurement: first, active control of air and fuel flow; second, offgas oxygen measurement; and third, measurement of offgas combustibles. For each heating process, there exists an optimum condition of minimal offgas heat loss with acceptable levels of combustibles concentration. Minimizing excess oxygen pays an additional benefit: for a given offgas temperature, the NOx level is lowest when excess oxygen is kept lowest.

Adherence to these two principles is furthered by making material and heat balances on the combustion process. The material balance directly relates the air/fuel ratio to the percentage of O_{2} in the combustion gas. The heat balance relates the heat available for the charge to the overall net heat produced by fuel combustion. Additional material and heat balances can be made to quantify the thermal advantage from preheating the combustion air, or enriching it in oxygen.

== Reaction mechanism ==
Combustion in oxygen is a chain reaction in which many distinct radical intermediates participate. The high energy required for initiation is explained by the unusual structure of the dioxygen molecule. The lowest-energy configuration of the dioxygen molecule is a stable, relatively unreactive diradical in a triplet spin state. Bonding can be described with three bonding electron pairs and two antibonding electrons, with spins aligned, such that the molecule has nonzero total angular momentum. Most fuels, on the other hand, are in a singlet state, with paired spins and zero total angular momentum. Interaction between the two is quantum mechanically a "forbidden transition", i.e. possible with a very low probability. To initiate combustion, energy is required to force dioxygen into a spin-paired state, or singlet oxygen. This intermediate is extremely reactive. The energy is supplied as heat, and the reaction then produces additional heat, which allows it to continue.

Combustion of hydrocarbons is thought to be initiated by hydrogen atom abstraction (not proton abstraction) from the fuel to oxygen, to give a hydroperoxide radical (HOO). This reacts further to give hydroperoxides, which break up to give hydroxyl radicals. There are a great variety of these processes that produce fuel radicals and oxidizing radicals. Oxidizing species include singlet oxygen, hydroxyl, monatomic oxygen, and hydroperoxyl. Such intermediates are short-lived and cannot be isolated. However, non-radical intermediates are stable and are produced in incomplete combustion. An example is acetaldehyde produced in the combustion of ethanol. An intermediate in the combustion of carbon and hydrocarbons, carbon monoxide, is of special importance because it is a poisonous gas, but also economically useful for the production of syngas.

Solid and heavy liquid fuels also undergo a great number of pyrolysis reactions that give more easily oxidized, gaseous fuels. These reactions are endothermic and require constant energy input from the ongoing combustion reactions. A lack of oxygen or other improperly designed conditions result in these noxious and carcinogenic pyrolysis products being emitted as thick, black smoke.

The rate of combustion is the amount of a material that undergoes combustion over a period of time. It can be expressed in grams per second (g/s) or kilograms per second (kg/s).

Detailed descriptions of combustion processes, from the chemical kinetics perspective, require the formulation of large and intricate webs of elementary reactions. For instance, combustion of hydrocarbon fuels typically involve hundreds of chemical species reacting according to thousands of reactions.

The inclusion of such mechanisms within computational flow solvers still represents a challenging task mainly in two aspects. First, the number of degrees of freedom (proportional to the number of chemical species) can be dramatically large; second, the source term due to reactions introduces a disparate number of time scales which makes the whole dynamical system stiff. As a result, the direct numerical simulation of turbulent reactive flows with heavy fuels soon becomes intractable even for modern supercomputers.

Therefore, a plethora of methodologies have been devised for reducing the complexity of combustion mechanisms without resorting to high detail levels. Examples are provided by:

- The Relaxation Redistribution Method (RRM)
- The Intrinsic Low-Dimensional Manifold (ILDM) approach and further developments
- The invariant-constrained equilibrium edge preimage curve method.
- A few variational approaches
- The Computational Singular perturbation (CSP) method and further developments.
- The Rate Controlled Constrained Equilibrium (RCCE) and Quasi Equilibrium Manifold (QEM) approach.
- The G-Scheme.
- The Method of Invariant Grids (MIG).

=== Kinetic modelling ===
The kinetic modelling may be explored for insight into the reaction mechanisms of thermal decomposition in the combustion of different materials by using for instance Thermogravimetric analysis.

== Temperature ==
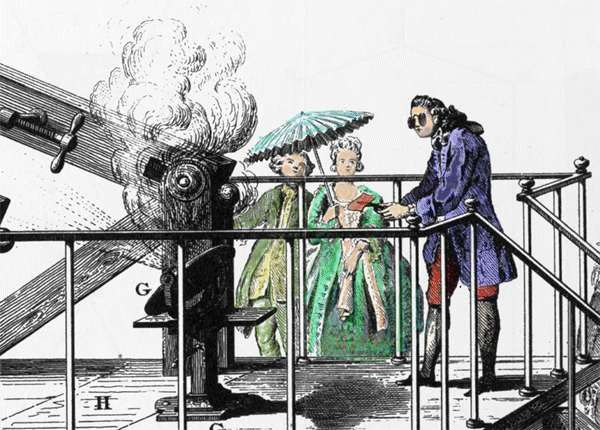
Antoine Lavoisier conducting an experiment related to combustion generated by amplified sunlight

Assuming perfect combustion conditions, such as complete combustion under adiabatic conditions (i.e., no heat loss or gain), the adiabatic combustion temperature can be determined. The formula that yields this temperature is based on the first law of thermodynamics and takes note of the fact that the heat of combustion is used entirely for heating the fuel, the combustion air or oxygen, and the combustion product gases (commonly referred to as the flue gas).

In the case of fossil fuels burnt in air, the combustion temperature depends on all of the following:

- the heating value;
- the stoichiometric air to fuel ratio ${\lambda}$;
- the specific heat capacity of fuel and air;
- the air and fuel inlet temperatures.

The adiabatic combustion temperature (also known as the adiabatic flame temperature) increases for higher heating values and inlet air and fuel temperatures and for stoichiometric air ratios approaching one.

Most commonly, the adiabatic combustion temperatures for coals are around 2,200 °C (3,992 °F) (for inlet air and fuel at ambient temperatures and for $\lambda = 1.0$), around 2,150 °C (3,902 °F) for oil and 2,000 °C (3,632 °F) for natural gas.

In industrial fired heaters, power station steam generators, and large gas-fired turbines, the more common way of expressing the usage of more than the stoichiometric combustion air is percent excess combustion air. For example, excess combustion air of 15 percent means that 15 percent more than the required stoichiometric air is being used.

== Instabilities ==
Combustion instabilities are typically violent pressure oscillations in a combustion chamber. These pressure oscillations can be as high as 180 dB, and long-term exposure to these cyclic pressure and thermal loads reduces the life of engine components. In rockets, such as the F1 used in the Saturn V program, instabilities led to massive damage to the combustion chamber and surrounding components. This problem was solved by re-designing the fuel injector. In liquid jet engines, the droplet size and distribution can be used to attenuate the instabilities. Combustion instabilities are a major concern in ground-based gas turbine engines because of NO_{x} emissions. The tendency is to run lean, an equivalence ratio less than 1, to reduce the combustion temperature and thus reduce the NO_{x} emissions; however, running the combustion lean makes it very susceptible to combustion instability.

The Rayleigh Criterion is the basis for analysis of thermoacoustic combustion instability and is evaluated using the Rayleigh Index over one cycle of instability

$G(x)=\frac{1}{T}\int_{T}q'(x,t)p'(x,t)dt$

where q' is the heat release rate perturbation and p' is the pressure fluctuation. When the heat release oscillations are in phase with the pressure oscillations, the Rayleigh Index is positive and the magnitude of the thermoacoustic instability is maximised. On the other hand, if the Rayleigh Index is negative, then thermoacoustic damping occurs. The Rayleigh Criterion implies that thermoacoustic instability can be optimally controlled by having heat release oscillations 180 degrees out of phase with pressure oscillations at the same frequency. This minimizes the Rayleigh Index.

== See also ==
Related concepts

- Air–fuel ratio
- Autoignition temperature
- Chemical looping combustion
- Deflagration
- Detonation
- Dust explosion
- Explosion
- Fire
- Flame
- Global warming
- Heterogeneous combustion
- Markstein number
- Phlogiston theory (historical)
- Spontaneous combustion

Machines and equipment

- Boiler
- Bunsen burner
- External combustion engine
- Furnace
- Gas turbine
- Internal combustion engine
- Rocket engine

Scientific and engineering societies

- International Flame Research Foundation
- The Combustion Institute

Other

- Combustible dust
- Biomass burning
- List of light sources
- Open burning of waste
- Stubble burning
