= Heterogeneous combustion =

Combustion process involving solids and gases

Heterogeneous combustion, otherwise known as combustion in porous media, is a type of combustion in which a solid and gas phase interact to promote the complete transfer of reactants to their lower energy potential products. In this type of combustion a high surface area solid is immersed into a gaseous reacting flow, additional fluid phases may or may not be present. Chemical reactions and heat transfer occur locally on each phase and between both phases. Heterogeneous Combustion differs from catalysis as there is no focus to either phase individually but rather both examined simultaneously. In some materials, such as silicon carbide (SiC), oxide layers, SiO and SiO_{2}, which form on the surface enable the adsorption of water vapor from the gas phase onto the solid lowering partial pressures. In this regime of combustion, thermal heat released from the combustion byproducts are transferred into the solid phase by convection; conduction and radiation both then conduct heat upstream (along with adverse convection within the gas phase). Heat is then convectively transferred to the unburnt reactants.

== Applications ==
Within the literature, there many applications of heterogeneous combustion which are derived from the unique manner in which this combustion process recirculates heat. These devices may be utilized as either stand alone devices, or in conjunction with other means of energy conversion for highly efficient combined heat and power (CHP) applications. For example, electricity production via both radiative and convective heat exchange with the combustion chamber can be accomplished using Organic Rankine Cycles in a multi step heating process, or using strictly radiative emissions via photovoltaic and thermionic generators. Heterogeneous combustors may be utilized for small-scale heating purposes, and as oxidizers of volatile organic compounds (VOCs). Heterogeneous combustion may also be combined in series and parallel with multiple injection stages for use in gas flares at chemical manufacturing plants or oil wells.

== Flame structure ==
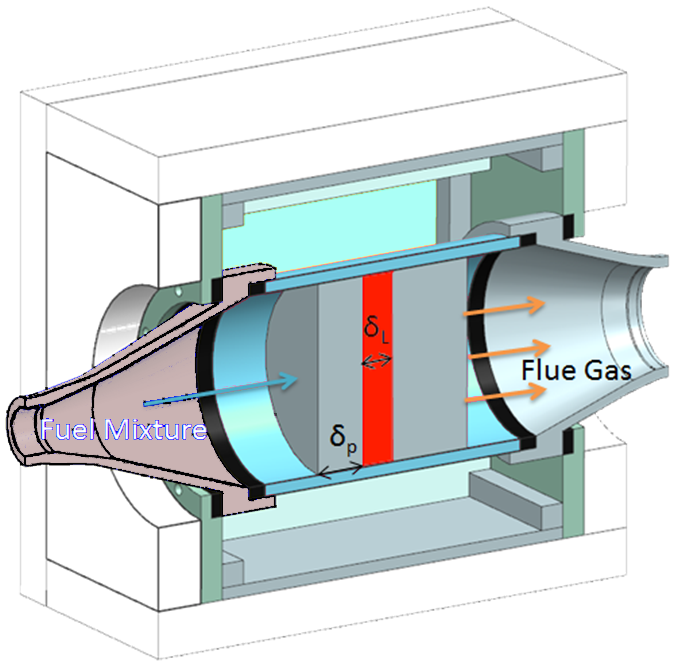
A diagram for a simple heterogeneous combustor, showing the flame location in red which exists within voids of a solid structure.

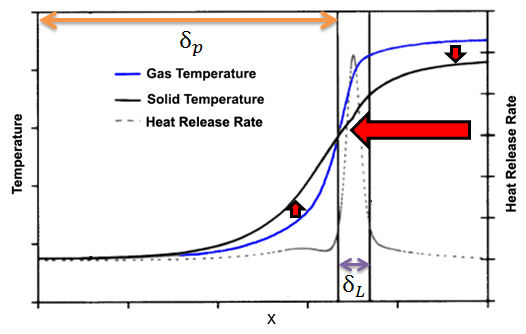
A plot showing the temperature of gas and solid phases for heterogeneous combustion with the direction of heat transfer marked in red.

Within a combustion chamber containing porous media, structure of the environment can be assumed as follows. A preheating region exists prior to the surface of the flame front denoted by δ_{p}. Preheating length is marked by the beginning of the porous solid where appreciable heat transfer to the gas phase occurs and ends when the solid and gas phase reach equilibrium temperature. The region of chemical heat release, the flame, whose thickness can be given as δ_{L}, exists following the preheat region and its length is dependent upon mass flux, surface properties, and equivalence ratio. Beyond the flame, where minimal chemical heat release occurs, heat is convectively transferred from the post combustion gases into the solid. Heat then conducts and radiates through the solid structure upstream through the flame. Within the preheating region, heat is again convectively transferred from the solid structure to the gas.

The flame structure inside the porous matrix has been imaged by using X-ray absorption. To evaluate the temperature within the gas phase, the reacting mixture was diluted with Krypton: an inert gas that has a large X-ray absorption coefficient.
