= Painted Rock =

Painted Rock or Painted Rocks may refer to:

== Geographic locations ==
=== United States ===
- Painted Rock (San Luis Obispo County, California), rock formation
- Painted Rock (Tulare County, California)
- Painted Rocks State Park, a Montana state park
- Yakima Indian Painted Rocks, state park in Washington
- Painted Rock Petroglyph Site, archaeological site and BLM facility near Theba, Arizona, listed on the U.S. National Register of Historic Places, formerly part of Painted Rock State Park
- Painted Rock Mountains, a mountain range in Maricopa County, Arizona
- Painted Rock Dam and associated reservoir, Arizona

=== Australia ===
- Painted Rocks (Western Australia), a rock in Western Australia

== See also ==
- Paint Rock (disambiguation)
- Painted Desert (disambiguation)
- Petroglyph
- Rock Art or Petrographs
- Rock Painting, the Finnish music album
- The Kindness Rock Project, a viral rock painting trend
