= Simmler, California =

Unincorporated community in California

- Unincorporated community
- Location within the state of California
- Coordinates: 35°21′05″N 119°59′13″W
- Country: United States
- State: California
- County: San Luis Obispo
- Elevation: 2,047 ft (624 m)
- Time zone: UTC−8 (Pacific (PST))
  - Summer (DST): UTC−7 (PDT)
- Area codes: 805 and 820
- GNIS feature ID: 252982

Simmler is an unincorporated community in San Luis Obispo County, California, United States. It lies at the junction of California State Route 58 and Soda Lake Road in the northern part of the Carrizo Plain, 38 miles (61 km) east of San Luis Obispo, at an elevation of 2,047 feet (624 m).

== History ==
A history of the Carrisa Plains compiled in 1959 by the teacher Ted R. Fisher and pupils of the Carrisa Plains School records that the Simmler post office took its name from a Mr. Simmler, a postmaster at San Luis Obispo. A postmaster named King took charge in 1904, and the office was discontinued in 1930 because mail could by then be carried more easily by road.

The Simmler School was established in 1891, about 6 miles (9.7 km) east and 1 mile (1.6 km) north of the site of its successor. A replacement was built in 1954 and 1955 on a ten-acre site and renamed Carrisa, after the reed grass of the plain; the old Simmler School building then passed to the Farm Bureau.

The junction of Soda Lake Road and Highway 58 was known as the Simmler community. The Santa Margarita Historical Society records that the Farm Bureau and the elementary school were the centers of its social life, with Saturday dances, card tournaments, school plays, a June barbecue, a women's group and, in later years, a volunteer fire department. Ranching families to the south of the plain, along Highway 166, found it easier to reach Maricopa and New Cuyama than to travel north to Simmler over the single road across the plain.

== Geography ==
A ranch along north Soda Lake Road, the route that meets State Route 58 at Simmler

Simmler lies in the northern Carrizo Plain, an enclosed grassland valley between the Caliente Range to the west and the Temblor Range to the east, near Soda Lake. Much of the surrounding plain became the Carrizo Plain National Monument.

=== Geology ===
The Simmler Formation, a geologic unit of the southern California Coast Ranges, is named after the settlement. The United States Geological Survey describes it as continental deposits, chiefly sandstone with interbedded silt and a basal conglomerate, about 3,000 feet (914 m) thick at its type locality southeast of the Caliente Range. It overlies the Pattiway Formation and is overlain by the Soda Lake sandstone member of the Vaqueros Formation, which places it in the Oligocene and perhaps the earliest Miocene. The formation also crops out in the northwestern Caliente Range near Soda Lake.

== See also ==
- California Valley
