= California Valley, California =

Unincorporated community in California, United States

California Valley
- Unincorporated community
- Location within the state of California California Valley (the United States)
- Coordinates: 35°17′38″N 119°58′16″W
- Country: United States
- State: California
- County: San Luis Obispo

Area
  - Total: 37.6 sq mi (97.5 km^{2})
- Elevation: 1,970 ft (600 m)

Population (2020)
  - Total: 2,414
  - Density: 64.1/sq mi (24.8/km^{2})
- Time zone: UTC-8 (Pacific (PST))
  - Summer (DST): UTC-7 (PDT)
- ZIP codes: 93453
- Area code: 805/820

California Valley (Spanish: Valle de California) is an unincorporated community located in the eastern part of San Luis Obispo County, California, United States, in the northern portion of the Carrizo Plain.

== Geography ==
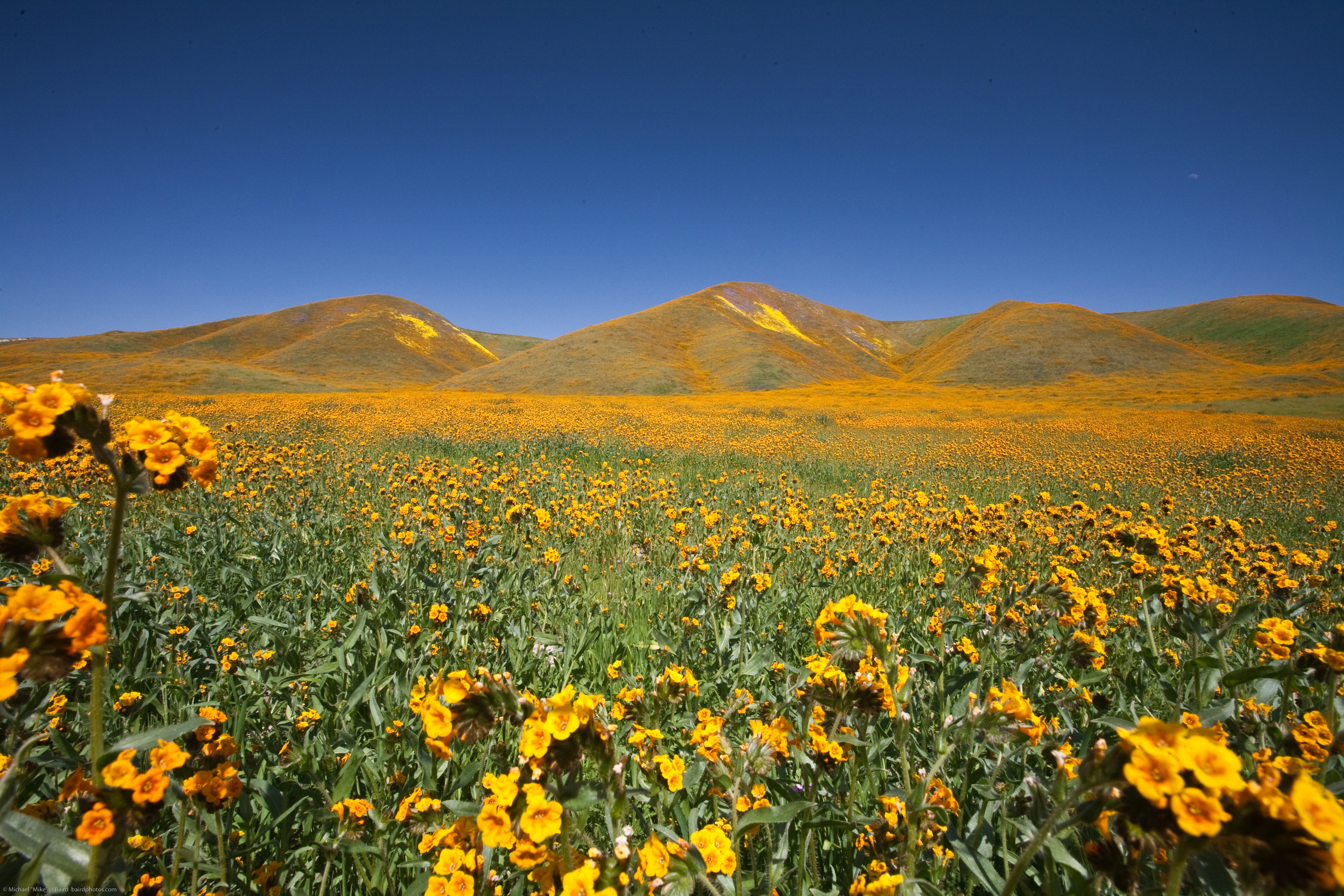
Wildflowers off Bitterwater Road, California Valley, March 2010.

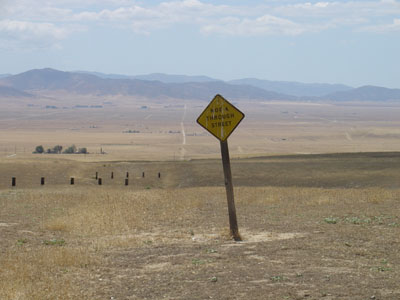
California Valley

The zoned area of the valley is 24,083 acres (97.5 square kilometers) and it is approximately 1,970 feet (600 m) above sea level. The valley is very nearly flat, bordered to the west by mountains (part of the Los Padres National Forest) and to the east by a major fault, the San Andreas Fault (part of the Temblor Range). Immediately south of California Valley is Soda Lake, which is part of the Carrizo Plain National Monument.

== Demographics ==
As of the 2020 Census, 2,414 people lived in California Valley with 1,206 total households. The racial makeup of was 2,293 (95%) White, 101 (4.2%) African American, 89 (3.7%) Native American, 89 (3.7%) from two or more races. Hispanic or Latino of any race were 172 persons (7.1%). Households had a median income of $50,893 and 12.3% of households were below the poverty level.

== History ==
California Valley is believed to have been visited by Native Americans passing through to the sacred site at Painted Rock, but no permanent Indian settlement existed due to a lack of easily accessible water. California Valley was a Spanish land grant, the El Chicote Ranch, that was used for seasonal cattle raising.

Local newspaper archives suggest that outlaws hid in California Valley from time to time up until the 1930s. The Spanish land grant was parceled out in 1960 into over 7,200 2.5 acre (10,000 m^{2}) sections by optimistic real estate developers. According to their own advertising fliers, these 1960 developers believed that the California State Water Project might bring water to the area. After a more northerly route (closer to Highway 41/46) for the State Water Project was selected, many buyers lost heart, many properties were abandoned and the developers went bankrupt. Several ranches and other developments built dirt or gravel airstrips and at least one paved runway was built and was at one time listed on aeronautical charts.

A few hundred people have built homes in this isolated area since, but the mass growth once promised never materialized. A Community Services District (CSD) was formed to deliver services to these residents, which includes trash collection, improvement of roads and the upkeep of a Community Center with a small public library.

Between 1960 and 2000, refuse and a number of old cars were dumped in the California Valley area, much of it by local residents, posing serious environmental issues. In 2006, a combined effort by the California Highway Patrol, California Department of Motor Vehicles, San Luis Obispo County Code Enforcement, and local businesses worked together to remove abandoned vehicles and accumulated trash.

== Infrastructure ==
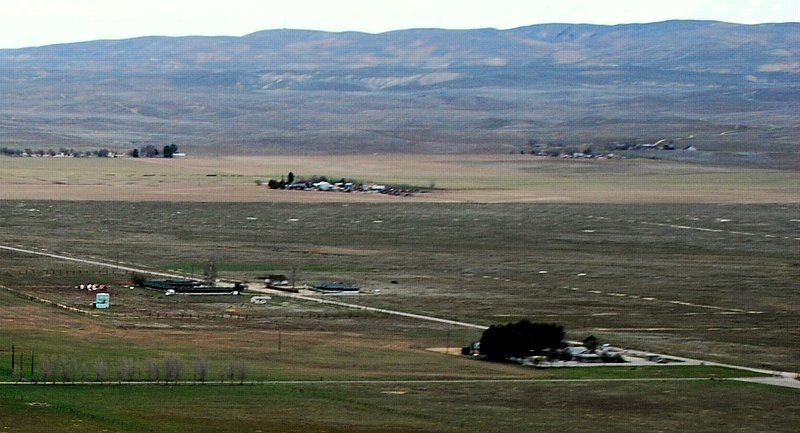
Aerial view northeast, with community center at lower right next to northern end of runway at right edge. Soda Lake Road is visible running diagonally up toward the left. The main community is about one mile (1.6 km) further south beyond the other end of the runway.

California Valley is located on Soda Lake Road about two miles (3 km) south of State Route 58. A small general store is closed, as well as the previously popular small restaurant. The community is served by a school and community center with library, open only on Wednesdays. Other than State Route 58 and Bitterwater Road, access is mainly through the Carrizo Plain via Soda Lake Road, which is a seasonal improved dirt road south of Soda Lake to State Route 33/State Route 166; or via smaller seasonal dirt roads to the east and south. No scheduled bus routes serve the community, and there are no rail lines.

=== Private airport ===
The private and restricted California Valley Airport Class II-C 4,200 ft (1,300 m) paved runway extends south from the community center but is not marked on current aeronautical charts and is painted at the south end with a white "X" indicating that it is closed although it can be used with advance permission.

=== Services ===
Community services are provided by the California Valley Community Service District (CSD). This includes road maintenance and limited trash service. The Community Center includes a fire station, small library, and community assembly hall. The address is 13084 Soda Lake Road, on the south side of Soda Lake Road, approximately 2 miles (3.2 km) south of Highway 58, in the village of California Valley.

Water, a porta-potty and a pay phone are available at the Community Center. The quality of the water is in dispute. Many California Valley residents consider the water potable, but signage to the contrary has been posted in the past.

Electricity is available in parts of California Valley. Telephone service is available through SBC. The local prefix is (805) 475-XXXX. There is strong analog mobile phone coverage and limited ("backscatter") GSM mobile phone coverage, as well as limited Nextel coverage. Verizon Wireless does have a sole tower which overlooks and covers a good portion of the valley.

The local zip code is 93453. Mail is delivered to drop boxes at the Community Center. Main roads (Belmont Trail, Soda Lake Road, Seven Mile Road) are paved to an extent. Others are packed dirt or decomposed granite. Other than the main roads, the only maintained roads are those with homes on them. Roads are frequently maintained only up to residential driveways.

Blue "No Services" signs are posted at major intersections leading into the California Valley area. No gas stations exist in the California Valley area. The nearest gasoline stations are in Taft/Maricopa, Atascadero/Santa Margarita, and on the outskirts of Paso Robles. This has led to stranded travelers on a number of occasions. Tow truck service is available but may be delayed for several hours.

Law enforcement is provided by the County Sheriff, but there is no local office or assigned unit. The California Highway Patrol infrequently patrols Highway 58. No medical services (doctors, clinics, hospitals) are available in the California Valley area. Fire and rescue services are provided by San Luis Obispo County Fire Station #42 located at the Community Center. The Station is staffed 24 hours a day, 7 days a week, all year long. Helicopter MEDEVAC service from Santa Maria and Bakersfield is available, weather permitting.

=== Schools ===
The local school is Carrisa Plains Elementary School, built in 1953, with about 46 students in attendance. The few high school students are bused to Atascadero, California, which had one of the last high school dormitories in California until the 1990s for their use. The nearest community college is in Taft. The nearest four-year university is California Polytechnic State University, San Luis Obispo

=== Nearby communities and services ===
The even smaller community of Simmler is about 3 miles (4.8 km) northeast along Highway 58. The Bureau of Land Management operates the Carrizo Plain National Monument Guy L. Goodwin Education Center about 12 miles (19 km) south on Soda Lake Road during limited hours for several months of the year.

== Natural resources and climate ==
California Valley is on the Carrizo Plain, which is an arid grassland. Only limited drinkable groundwater is available. Nearby Soda Lake is an alkali lake and undrinkable. "The future development of California Valley is anticipated to be limited by water availability"—San Luis Obispo County General Plan. Alkaline soils hinder attempts at agricultural development.

Future development

The Carrizo Plain National Monument, administered by the United States Bureau of Land Management, was established to protect elements of native history and the undeveloped ecology of the southern part of the valley.

== Industry and uses ==
Most residents are retirees or have other outside incomes. Neighboring ranches raise cattle. Some of the empty residential-zoned lands are used for illegal sheep grazing under contract with the Community Service District. Litigation brought upon the CSD by several residents resulted in the CSD banning grazing agreements and an undisclosed settlement amount. Other activities of interest in California Valley include an Indian sweat lodge, hot air ballooning, bird-watching, and astronomy, due to clear skies and no light pollution. In particular, Highway 58 is a popular route for car and motorcycle touring enthusiasts due to very low traffic and winding roads.

With the recent surge (and equally sudden decline) in oil prices, along with state emphasis on development of renewable energy sources, solar energy firms have studied California Valley and adjacent areas for siting possible solar power generating facilities. As the area is one of the sunniest in the United States, and competition from other economically self-sustaining land uses has been minimal, several such facilities are already under consideration. Two solar plants, California Valley Solar Ranch 250MW (SunPower) and Topaz Solar Farm 550MW (First Solar/MidAmerican) are under construction and already providing power to the state grid; another smaller plant, by Ausra, was purchased by First Solar and incorporated into Topaz Solar Farm. The combined Ausra and OptiSolar projects make Topaz Solar Farm one of the largest photovoltaic power plants in the world. The two projects, about 10 miles apart, also represent two of the largest solar power contracts for Pacific Gas & Electric Company, which is under state mandate to increase its supply of renewable electricity to 33 percent by 2020.

== See also ==
- Carrizo Plain
- California Valley Airport
- Painted Rock
