= Shalawa Meadow =

Seaside ancient burial site used by the Chumash people

- Hammond's Meadow; Hammond's Estate Site
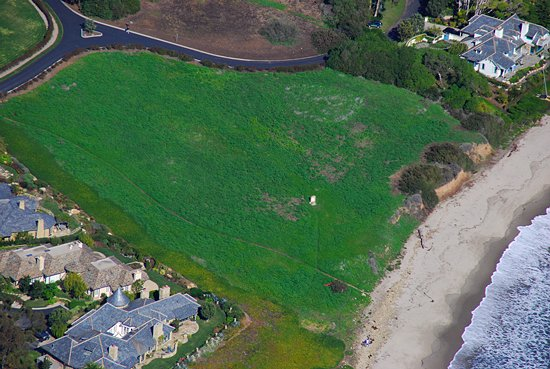
- Aerial view
- Interactive map of Shalawa Meadow
- Location: Montecito, California, U.S.
- Nearest city: Santa Barbara, California
- Coordinates: 34°25′0.36″N 119°38′9.22″W
- Owner: Santa Barbara County Parks

Shalawa Meadow (also called Hammond's Meadow) is a 3-acre (0.012 km^{2}) seaside meadow in the community of Montecito, California. Used in ancient times as a burial site by the Chumash people and adjoining a formerly large Chumash community, it is about 5 miles (8.0 km) east of Santa Barbara.

== History ==
The South Coast area of Santa Barbara County has a history as one of the most important archaeological regions in California, having been densely occupied by the Chumash for over 13,000 years. They ranged from the Santa Barbara Channel Islands north to the Carrizo Plain in most of what is now Santa Barbara, San Luis Obispo, and Ventura Counties. Many traces of their settlements, art, crafts and tools have been found in this region and many are on display in local museums. Ancient rock art may also be viewed in locations such as Painted Cave in the hills a few miles from Shalawa. This coastal region is also said to be extremely significant in Native American culture due to the spiritual "Western Gate" in the nearby Point Conception area.

== Development ==
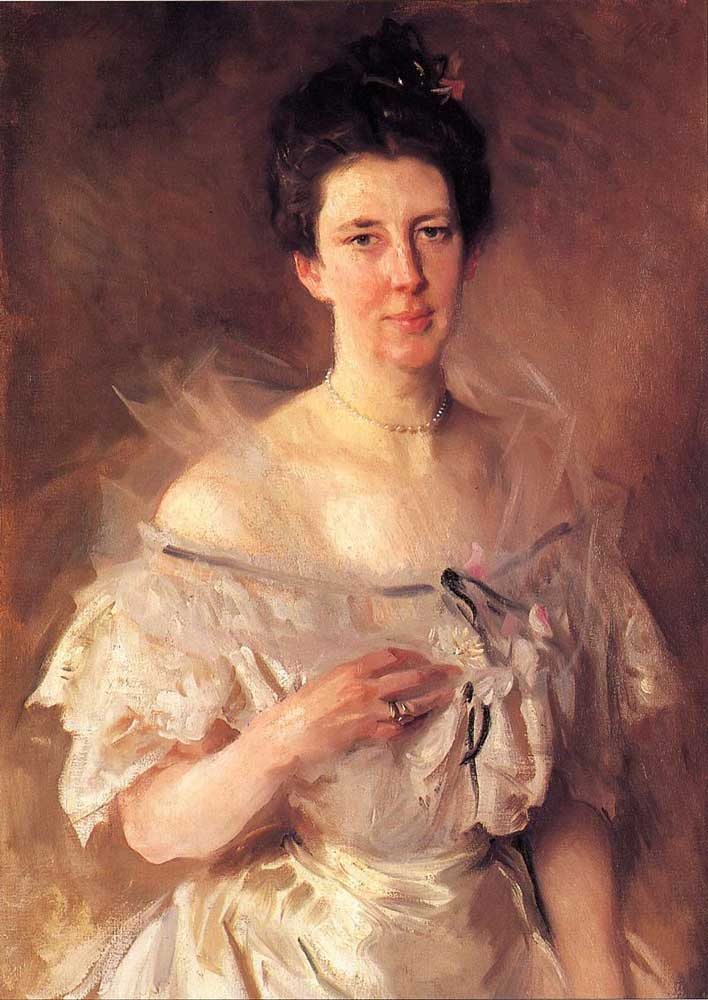
Mrs. Gardiner Green Hammond (Esther Fiske Hammond), John Singer Sargent, 1903

A mansion named Bonnymede was built in 1906 on a large estate that included what is now the small remaining Shalawa Meadow. Esther Fiske Hammond, who died in 1955, bought the estate in the early 1900s and through 1950 her family built other structures there. Her son George built an airstrip and ran a business flying supplies to a family on nearby San Miguel Island.

In 1958 most of the estate was sold to developers, and a condo complex was built in the 1960s named for the Bonnymede mansion that was destroyed in a fire. Complex and contentious negotiations followed until 1989, when 20 condos and 12 private homes were built on the remaining land with three acres of the meadow preserved for public use. Hammond's Estate is on the only Chumash site in the coastal zone that is currently listed on the National Register of Historic Places. Some controversy continues regarding use and maintenance of the meadow, one of the few remaining public coastal parcels in Montecito. The adjoining beach is one of California's popular surfing locations.

== Monument ==
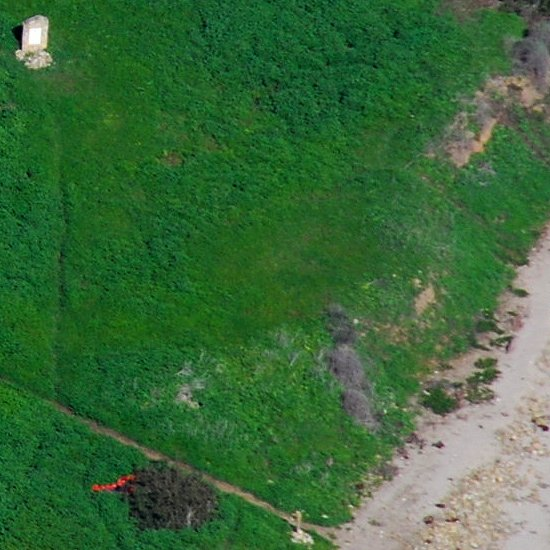
Monument area (top left)

In 1979 a Chumash elder began a movement to protect the sacred nature of the site, joined by surfers and some area residents.

A marker monument was built on the small remaining parcel near the southern (beach) approach to Shalawa Meadow with colorful inlaid ceramic tiles adorned with lizards, birds, flowers, and two bas-relief dolphins in turquoise ceramic along with this inscription:

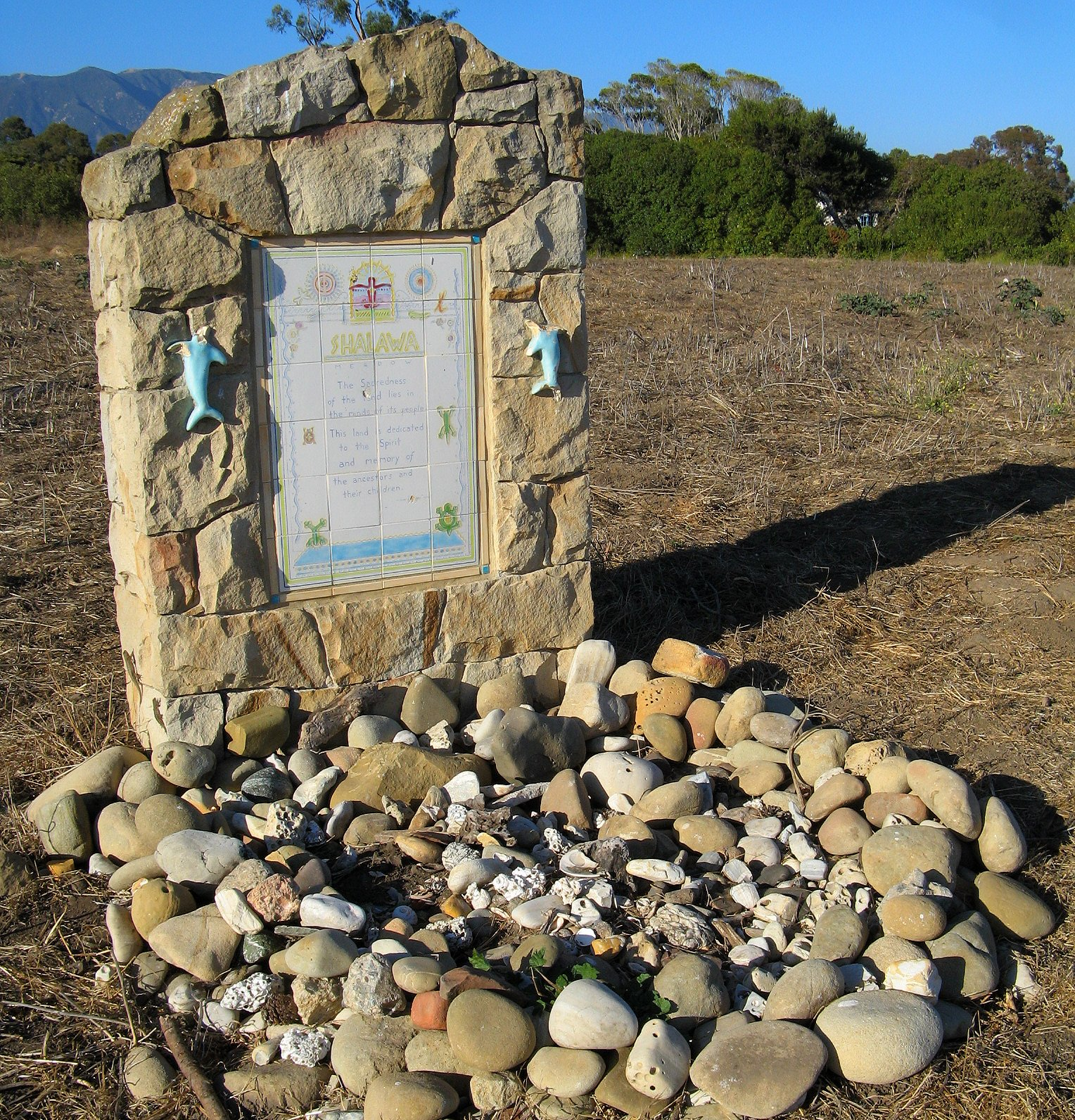
Monument as of July 11, 2009

The Sacredness

of the land lies in
the minds of its people.
This land is dedicated
to the Spirit
and memory of
the ancestors and

their children.

Ceremonies are still held on the site during significant celestial events such as solstice and equinox.

During summer months the meadow is mowed to bare ground, exposing many gopher holes and reducing the natural aesthetic. This is apparently done to reduce fire hazard, and possibly also to make it less attractive for unauthorized camping.

== Access ==
Access is possible from U.S. Route 101. The Hammond Meadow Trail can be accessed at the south end of San Ysidro Road, where there is parking at the Eucalyptus Lane beach access. Facing the ocean, the trail starts out to the right, and after a short distance, reaches Hammond Beach to the east of the Coral Casino. Walking back to the starting point via the beach makes for a loop with a variety of scenery.

== See also ==
- Burro Flats Painted Cave
- Chumash Painted Cave State Historic Park, California
- Chumash people
- History of Santa Barbara, California
- Painted Rock
