= Chumash Painted Cave State Historic Park =

State park in Santa Barbara County, California

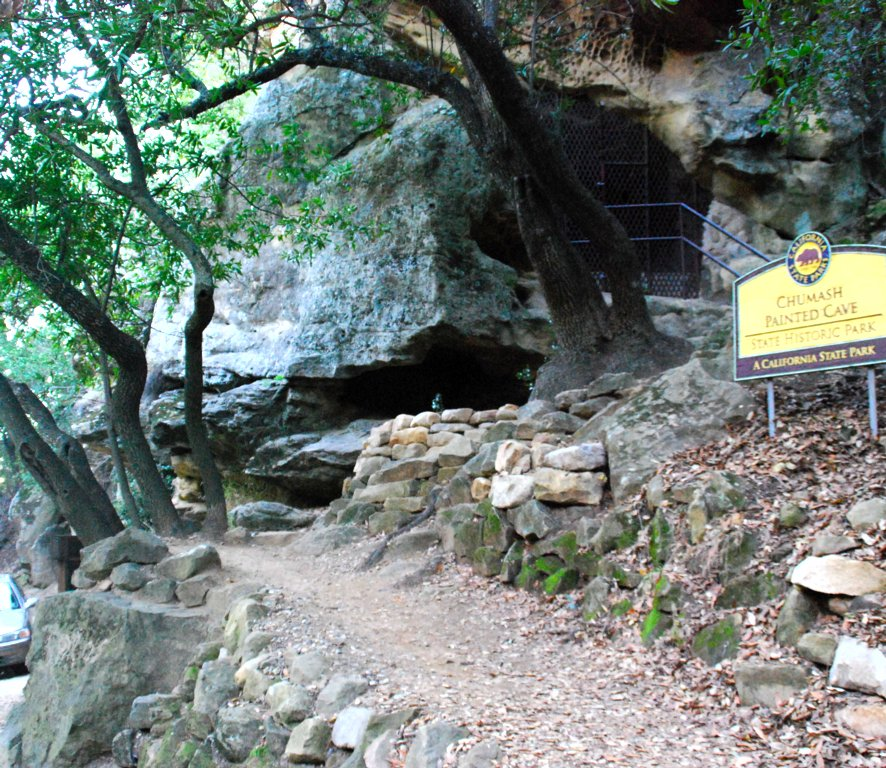
- Park setting with art protected by metal gate at cave entrance

- Location within California Location within the United States
- Location: Santa Barbara County, California
- Nearest city: Santa Barbara, California
- Coordinates: 34°30′15″N 119°47′13″W
- Area: 7.5 acres (3.0 ha)
- Established: 1976
- Governing body: California Department of Parks and Recreation

U.S. National Register of Historic Places
- Official name: Painted Cave
- Designated: 1972
- Reference no.: 72000256

Chumash Painted Cave State Historic Park is a unit in the state park system of California, United States, preserving a small sandstone cave adorned with rock art attributed to the Chumash people. Adjoining the small community of Painted Cave, the site is located about 2 miles (3.2 km) north of California State Route 154 and 11 miles (18 km) northwest of Santa Barbara. The 7.5-acre (3.0 ha) park was established in 1976.

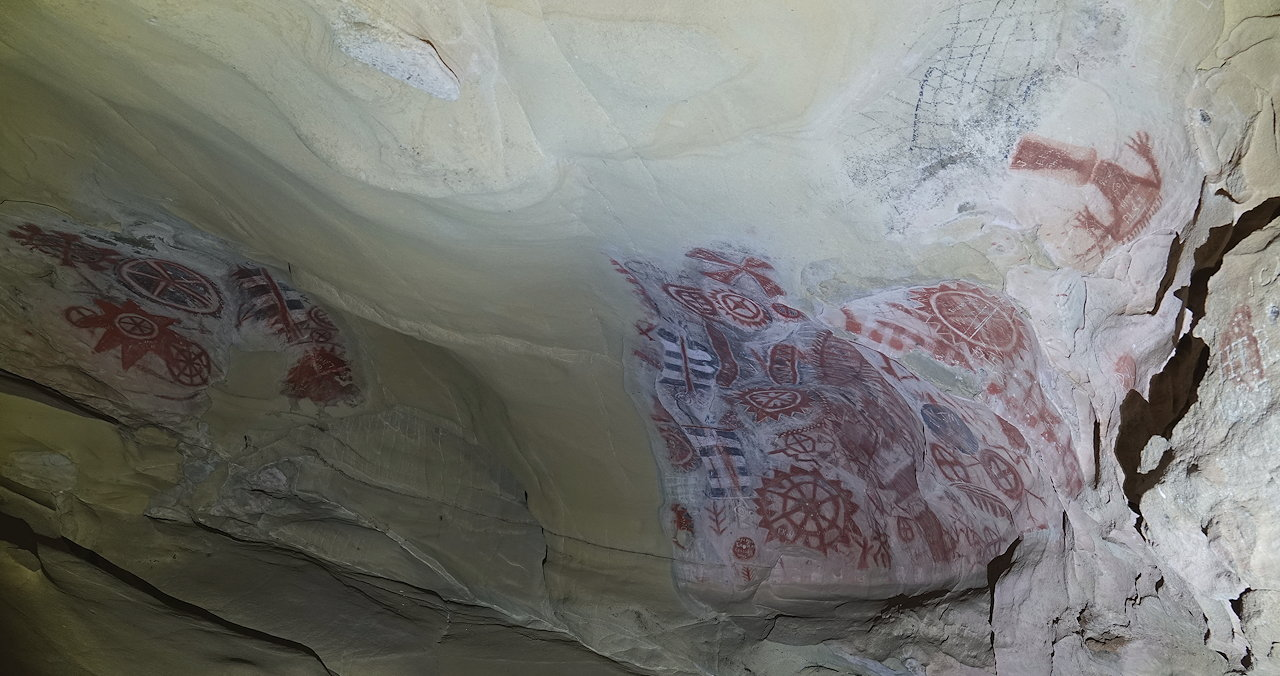
Wide view of the cave

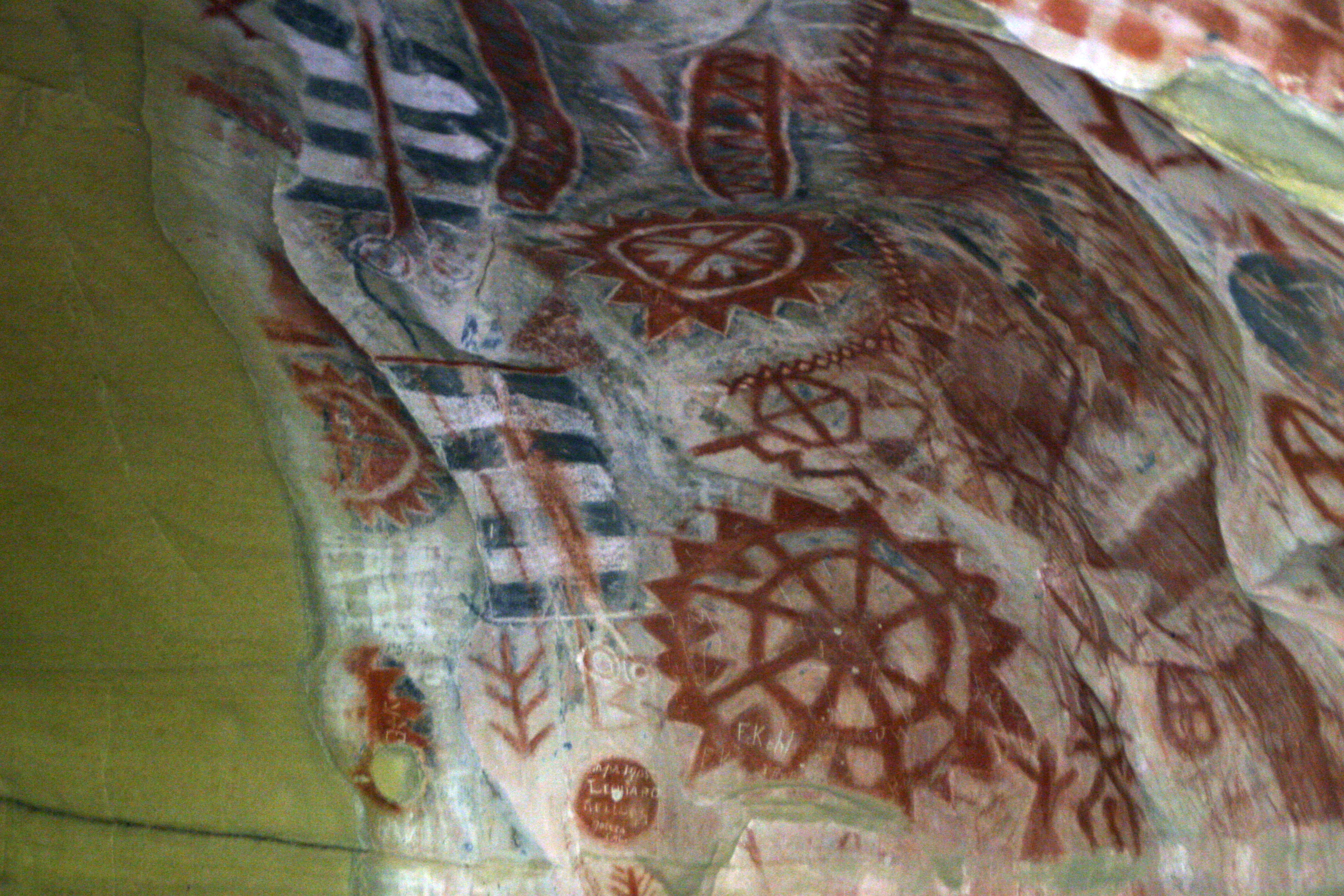
Closer view of the art

The smooth and irregularly shaped shallow sandstone cave contains numerous drawings apparently depicting the Chumash cosmology and other subjects created in mineral pigments and other media over a long period ranging from about 200 up to possibly 1000 years or more. There is also evidence of graffiti beginning with early white settlers, which eventually led to creation of a protective physical barrier and State Historic Park status. In 1972 it was added as Site #72000256 on the National Register of Historic Places.

Access is from State Route 154 about 5 miles (8.0 km) north of U.S. Route 101 in the San Marcos Pass in the Santa Ynez Mountains, on Painted Cave Road. The cave is adjacent to the left side of this narrow one-lane mountain road, with a slightly widened shoulder that provides parking for one or two vehicles. The drive is not appropriate for trailers and RVs, due to some very tight turns and steep sections. This park is one of the few providing open access for viewing original rock art of the Chumash people in person. Flash photographs are prohibited since they can harm the artwork; some people use flashlights to help view the art, and some take photographs with long exposures with the camera braced on the metal gate or using a tripod.

== See also ==
- Burro Flats Painted Cave
- Chumash people
- Painted Rock
- Shalawa Meadow, California
- List of California state parks
