= Painted Desert =

Painted Desert may refer to:

== Geography ==
- Painted Desert (Arizona), an area of badlands in the southwestern United States
  - Painted Desert Inn, a lodge at the Petrified Forest National Park
- Painted Desert (South Australia), a mountainous area in south-central Australia
- Painted Desert, a neighborhood in Las Vegas, Nevada, US

== Art, entertainment, and media ==
=== Film ===
- The Painted Desert, a 1931 film starring Clark Gable
- Painted Desert (1938 film), a 1938 remake starring George O'Brien and Laraine Day
- Painted Desert, a 1993 film featuring Don Keith Opper

=== Music ===
- Painted Desert, a movement in the Grand Canyon Suite by Ferde Grofé
- The Painted Desert, a 2004 album by the Barrett Martin Group
- The Painted Desert, a 2005 composition for brass band by Philip Sparke

==== Songs ====
- "Painted Desert", a song on the 1970 album The Price You Got to Pay to Be Free by Cannonball Adderley
- "The Painted Desert", a 1985 single by Pat Benatar from her 1984 album Tropico
- "The Painted Desert", a song by 10,000 Maniacs from their 1987 album In My Tribe

== Other uses ==
- Arizona elegans philipi, commonly known as the Painted Desert glossy snake

== See also ==
- Red Desert (disambiguation)
