= California Valley Airport =

Airport in California, United States

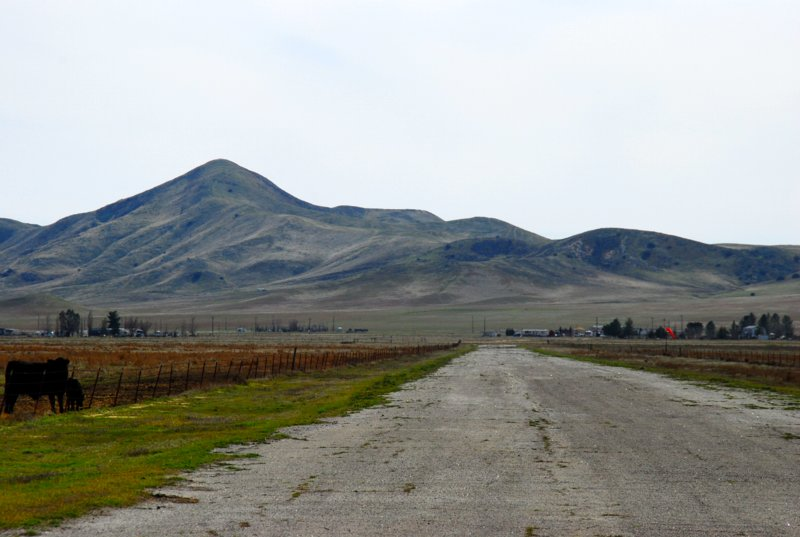
- View south for 13 takeoff 2009
- IATA: none; ICAO: none

Summary
- Airport type: Private
- Owner: Bill Gates
- Serves: California Valley, California
- Elevation AMSL: 1,968 ft / 600 m
- Coordinates: 35.320°N 120.003°W
- Interactive map of California Valley Airport

Runways
Direction	Length		Surface
Direction	ft	m	Surface
13/31	4,200	1,280	Asphalt

California Valley Airport was a privately owned restricted-use (apparently closed) airport located adjacent to the community center of California Valley, in the sparsely populated Carrizo Plain of San Luis Obispo County, California, United States.

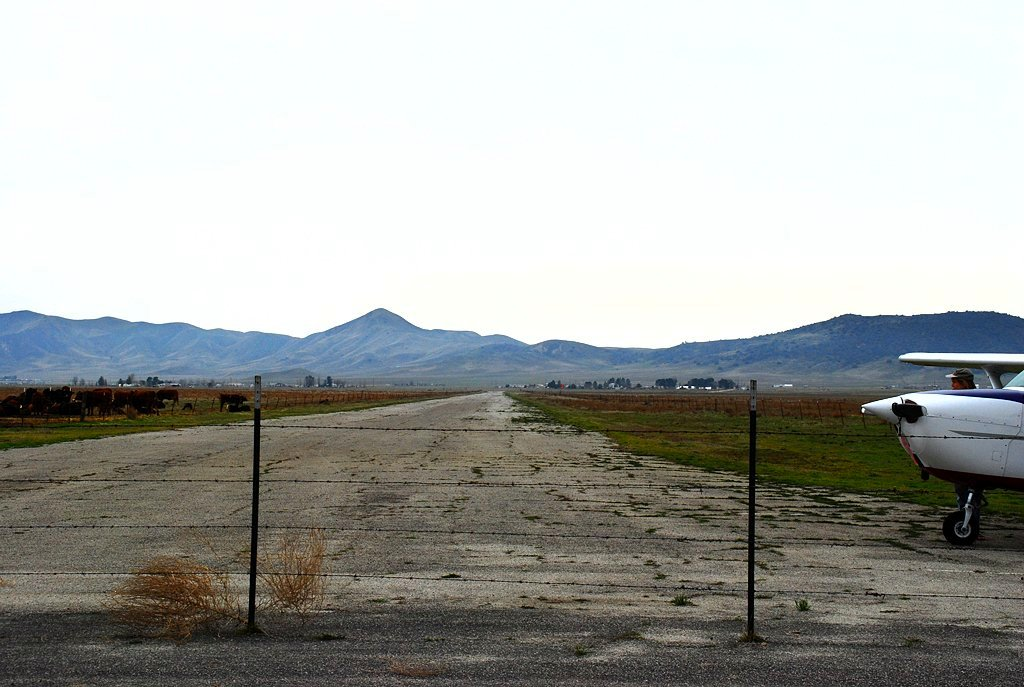
C-172 at Tiedown 2/09

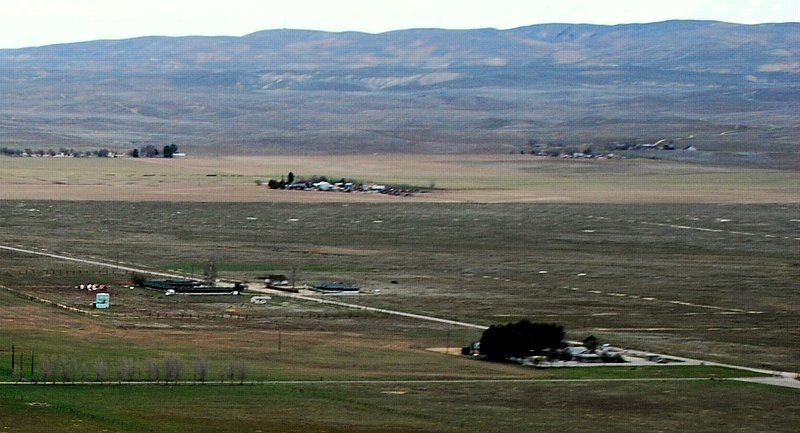
Aerial view NE 2/09

As of Summer 2022 both runway ends are marked with a deteriorating white "X" indicating they are closed to use. This airport is not depicted on current FAA Sectional charts, but there are several public use airports within 30nm. The runway surface appears to have deteriorated considerably since 2009, now be in fair to poor condition, and might no longer be used even with prior permission. There is no known contact number and although the North end is adjacent to the community center, no services or ground transportation are likely available. This airport was previously used privately by CHP, BML, CalFire; and for emergency medical helicopter evacuation.

Typical traffic direction was toward the north on runway 31, with limited tiedowns at the northwest end marked by short white perpendicular lines. Barbed wire fence may surround the runway, and may be a hazard to some aircraft. Cattle are occasionally loose inside the fenced runway, or just outside the fence. There may be some loose stones and debris on the runway surface. A wind sock was located at the west fence approximately mid-field. Avoid overflight of the airport below 1,000' MSL due to nearby homes and buildings, and practice noise abatement procedures.

Note that high winds are often encountered, including gusty crosswinds, and weather conditions can change abruptly. High temperatures in summer can result in high density altitude conditions. This valley has been considered for wind electricity generation sites, indicating the strength and frequency of windy conditions. There are currently several solar energy projects in the valley.

== See also ==
- California Valley, California
- Carrizo Plain
- Painted Rock
