= Painted Rock (San Luis Obispo County, California) =

Rock formation in California, United States

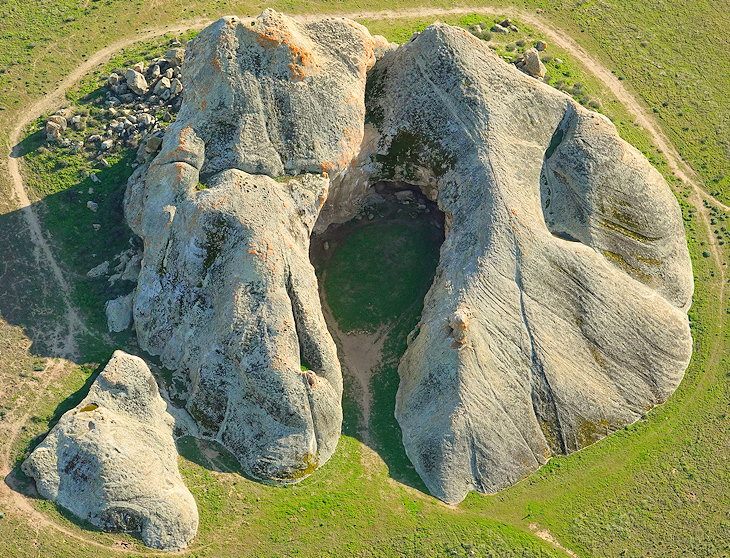
- Aerial view of Painted Rock looking south, taken February, 2019.
- Interactive map of Painted Rock
- Location: Carrizo Plain National Monument, San Luis Obispo County, California, United States
- Nearest city: Taft, California
- Coordinates: 35°8′46.02″N 119°51′42.27″W
- Governing body: United States Bureau of Land Management

U.S. National Monument

Painted Rock is a smooth horseshoe-shaped marine sandstone rock formation with pictograph rock art about 250 feet across and 45 feet tall near Soda Lake within the Carrizo Plain National Monument on the southwest side of the northern Carrizo Plain, west of Bakersfield and about 70 miles (110 km) east of San Luis Obispo and 45 miles (72 km) west of Taft, in California, United States.

== History ==
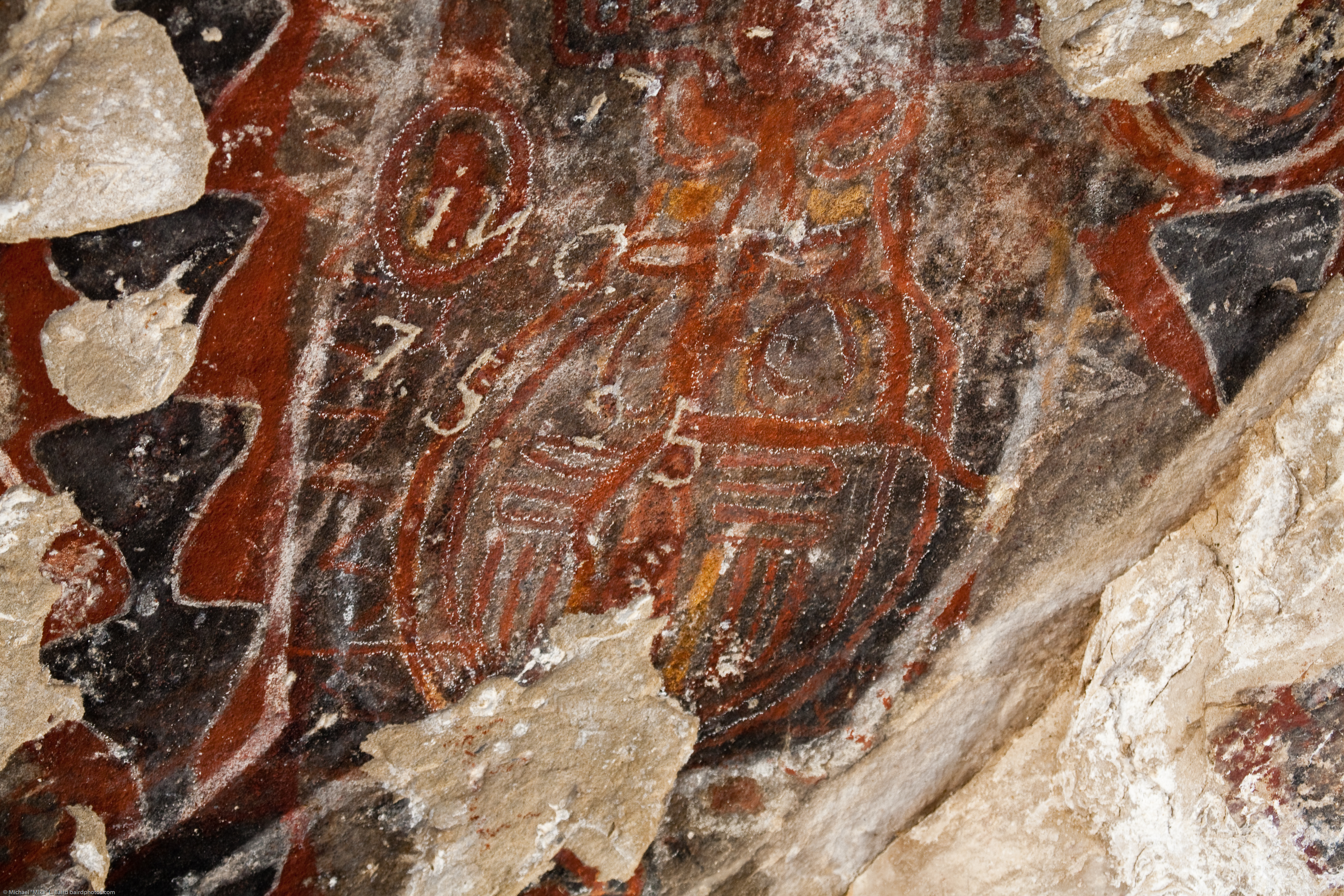
Pictograph at Painted Rock.

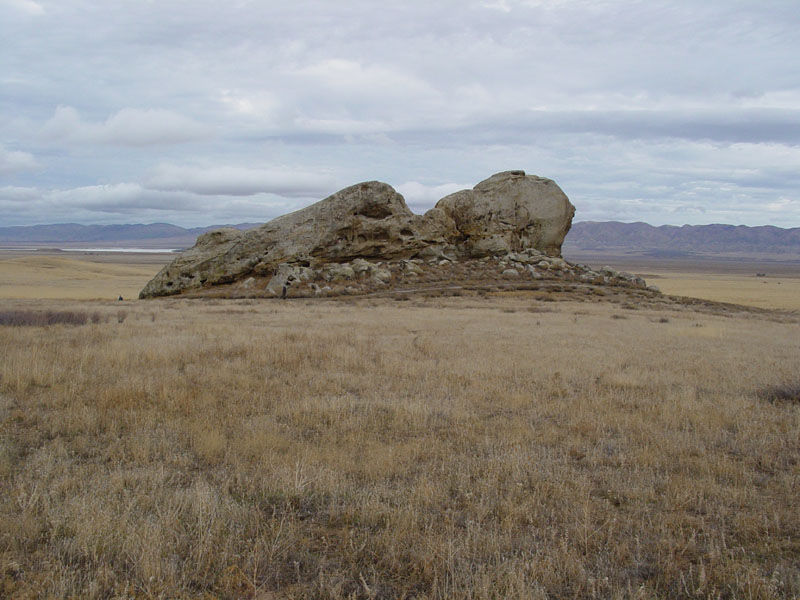
View north to Soda Lake.

The interior of the rock alcove is adorned with many pictographs created by the Chumash, Salinan and Yokuts peoples over many thousands of years. In recent times there have been many marks left by early White settlers such as one reading "Geo. Lewis 1908", founder of Atascadero, California. Unfortunately there has also been major defacing of this site; in the 1920s the large pictogram was irreparably damaged by a shotgun blast.

Ancient rock art in red, black and white yucca pigments, and some yellow, green and blue were painted with rodent tail hair brushes or simple finger painting. Estimates are that the Chumash people first populated the Carrizo Plain about 2000 BCE but mostly abandoned it, possibly due to drought, about CE 600.

The Yokuts people common in the nearby San Joaquin Valley moved in and out of the Carrizo Plain area after the Chumash departed, creating their own rock art. Yokut pictographs often include large colorful figures and motifs, while the Chumash pictographs tend toward small elements, circular mandalas, and complex red, black and white panels.

There is much debate about what group of native peoples lived in this area, as the Salinan, Yokut and Chumash peoples all lay claim to it. The rock art at Painted Rock is inferred to have been produced in shamanic tradition or ritual. The meanings of the symbols have many interpretations but can only be inferred. Ongoing literature discussion speculates that the imagery was produced in association with shamanic trance and hallucination. However, the word shaman encompasses a broad range of societal roles filled by very different people across many different cultures. The concept of "shaman" has also evolved into different meanings in modern society.

Spaniards came through the area in the 18th century; rancheros of Portuguese descent left engravings on Painted Rock in the late 19th century. The rock art now attracts thousands of visitors each year. Unfortunately, heavy graffiti and reckless gunshot damage to the prehistoric rock art was mostly done in the 1920s. Ongoing damage has continued. As a result, the site is now protected by law, has limited access, and has vigilant surveillance. Although volunteers removed some of the damage in 1991, the extent of destruction is almost overwhelming to observers (Painted Rock is often described as a "ruined" heritage site). However, even the modern damage may be evaluated in a historic context by future generations. Ongoing animal burrowing, natural weathering, and erosion are also degrading the site. The Goodwin Education Center is located near Painted Rock and provides environmental education and guided tours. Painted Rock is closed during raptor nesting season (March 1 through July 15). Native Americans still frequently use Painted Rock for ceremonies and other activities.

== Geology ==
Regional Geologic Map of San Andreas and Related Faults in Carrizo Plain, Temblor, Caliente and La Panza Ranges and Vicinity, California

Painted Rock Sandstone is a marine sandstone that is a member of the Vaqueros Formation of the Saucesian Stage (formed approximately 22 to 16.5 million years ago) corresponding to the earliest part of the Miocene Epoch of the Neogene Period.

Explanation: Regional Geologic Map of San Andreas and Related Faults

== Access ==
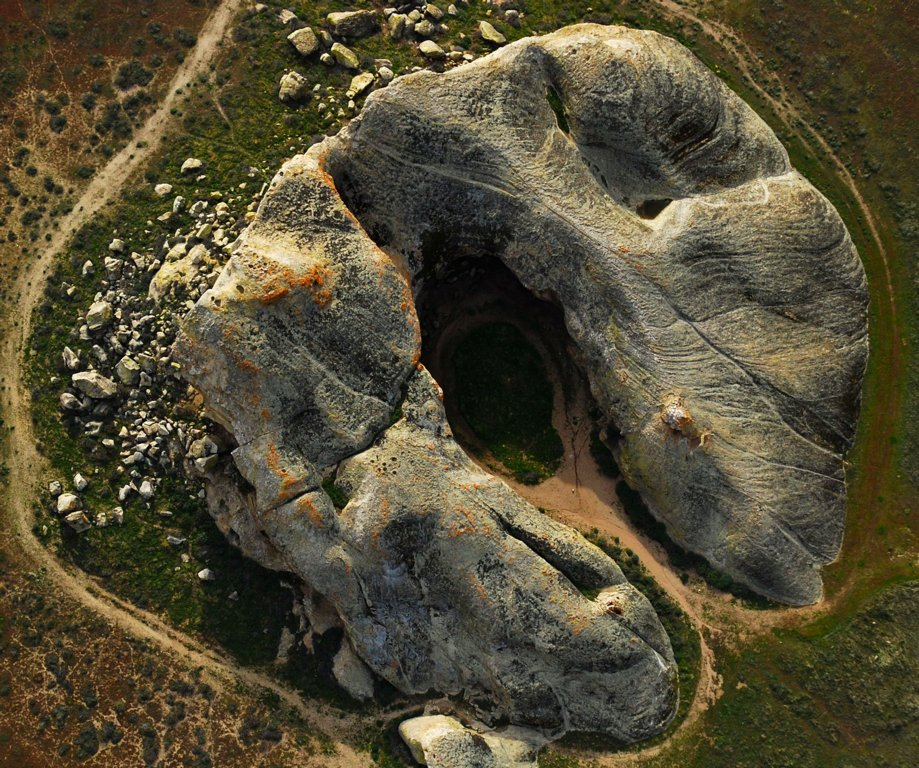
Aerial overhead view.

Painted Rock can be reached by footpath from the Goodwin Center off Soda Lake Road, which runs northwest–southeast between State Route 166 and State Route 58. Like most roads within Carrizo Plain, it is unpaved and subject to sudden closure during and after rainy weather. Note that Painted Rock is a protected area and regularly closed to the public between March 1 and the end of May except for guided tours.

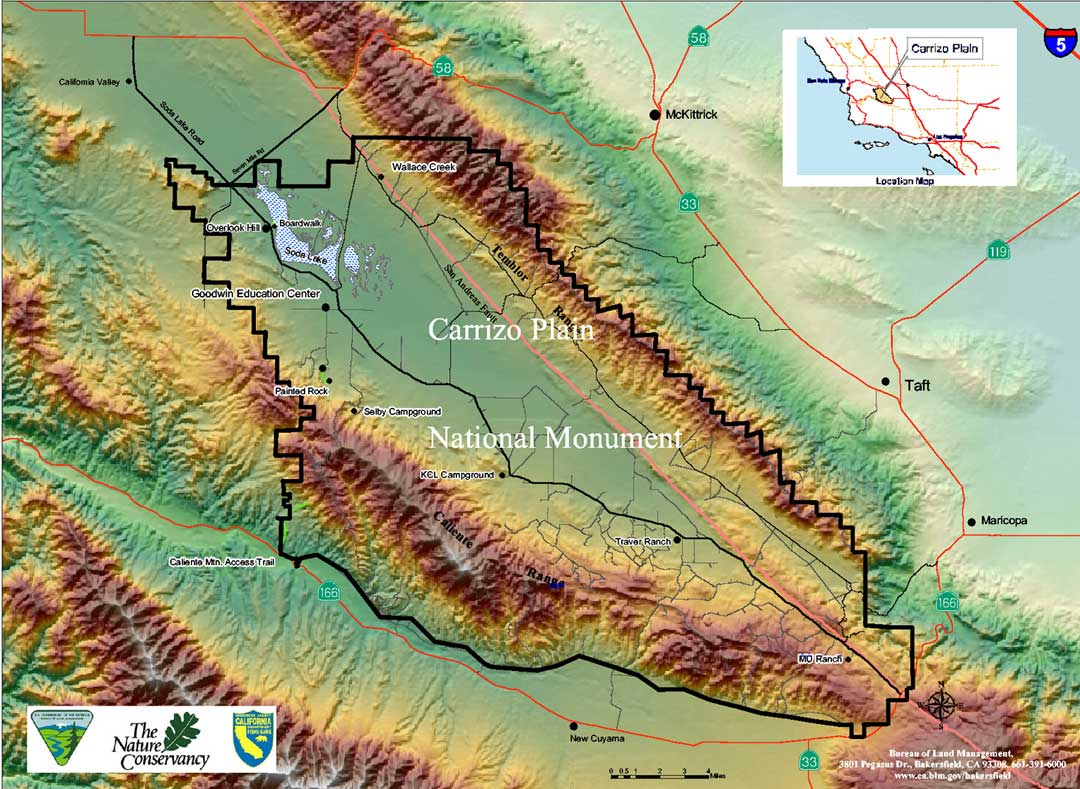
Relief Map

In this wilderness area visitors are advised to carry sufficient fuel, food, water and medical supplies since there are no services and cellphone coverage is sparse. At an elevation of 1,900 feet (580 m), days can be very hot and nights quite cold. The climate is dry, with most rain falling in winter and annual totals averaging about 6 inches (150 mm).

Walking in the Carrizo Plain area can be dangerous due to low humidity, temperature extremes and rattlesnakes; and is also difficult due to tall grass hiding a very irregular ground surface created by the many burrowing mammals including an endangered species of kangaroo rat.

== Goodwin Center and Museum ==
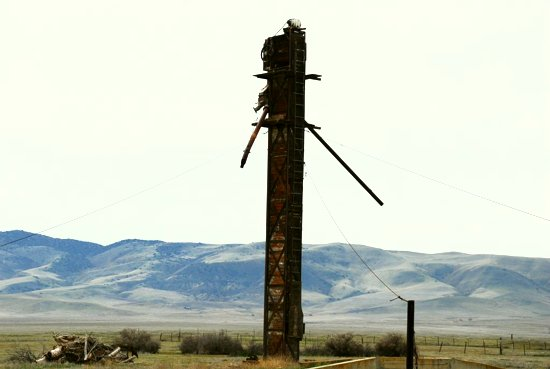
Part of display.

During limited business hours, visitor services for the area are provided by the Goodwin Education Center at 805.475-2131 during the months of December through May. In addition to some Painted Rock tours and details, it also provides information and displays regarding threatened and endangered Carrizo Plain wildlife species. These include the San Joaquin kit fox, the blunt-nosed leopard lizard, the giant kangaroo rat, and the San Joaquin antelope squirrel.

There is also information and history regarding settlement and farming of the area. Outside the new museum are antique farm equipment and machinery on display, along with picnic areas and walking trails.

The main access road to Painted Rock begins at Goodwin Center, and when closed during rains there is usually access here for hiking in. During the limited business hours of Goodwin Center, maps and a BLM ranger are usually available for more information.

== Gallery ==
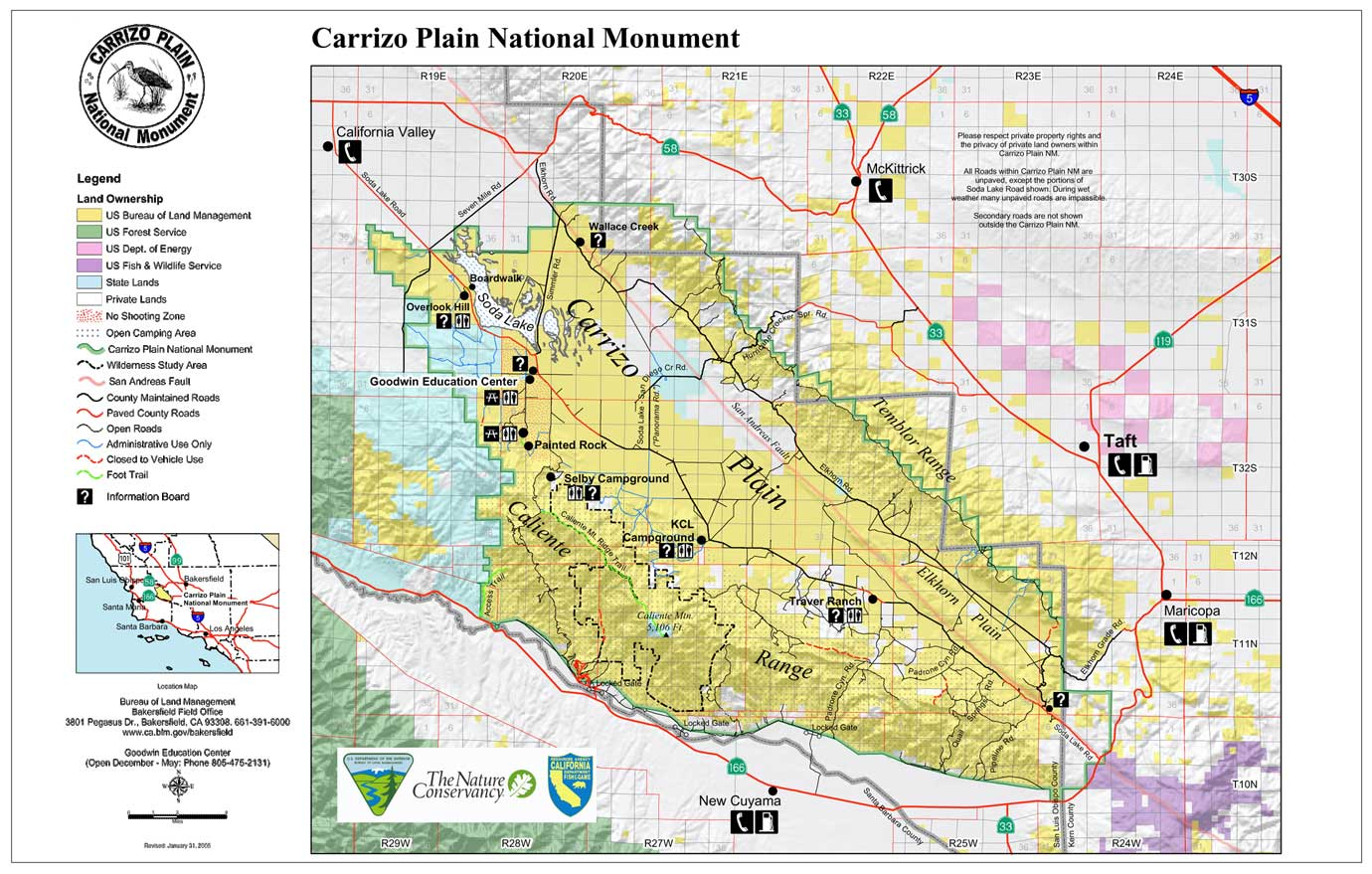
Map of the Carrizo Plain

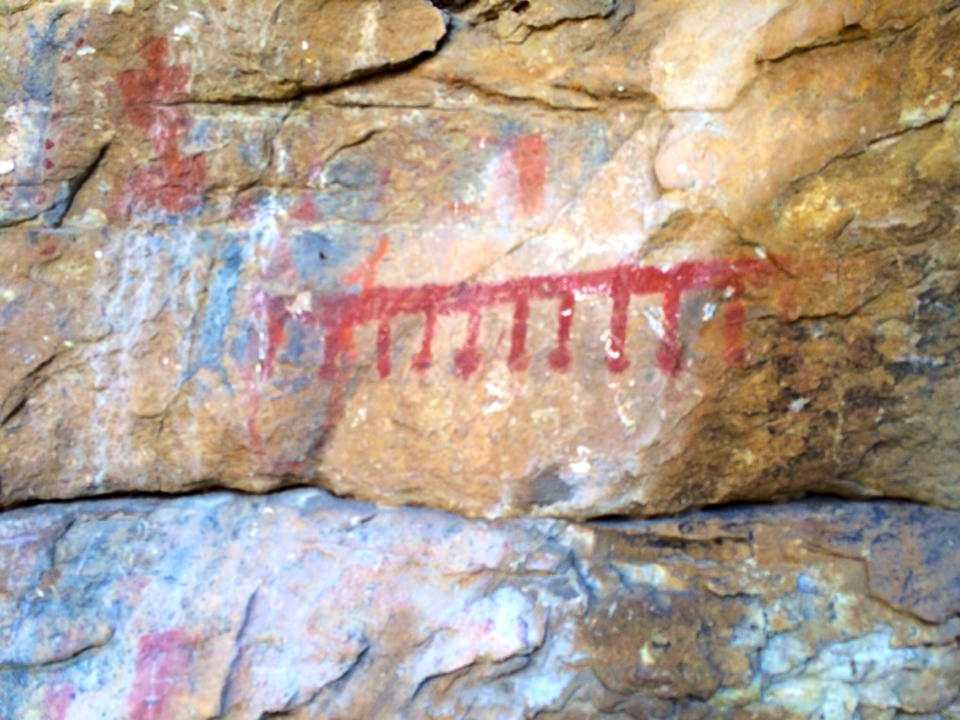
The symbol for rain.

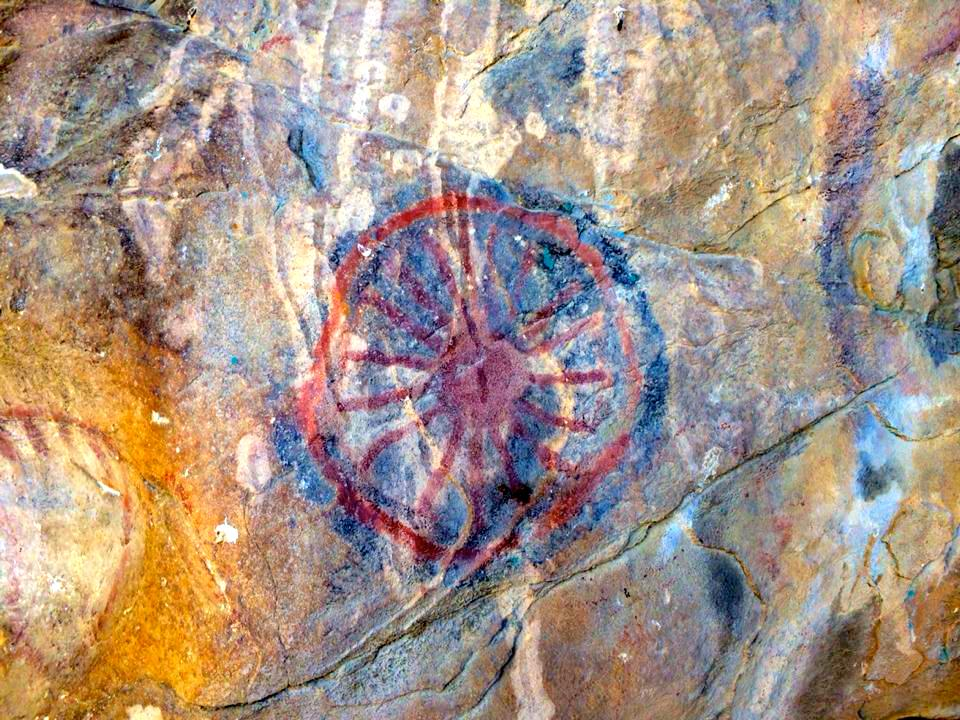
The symbol for the sun.

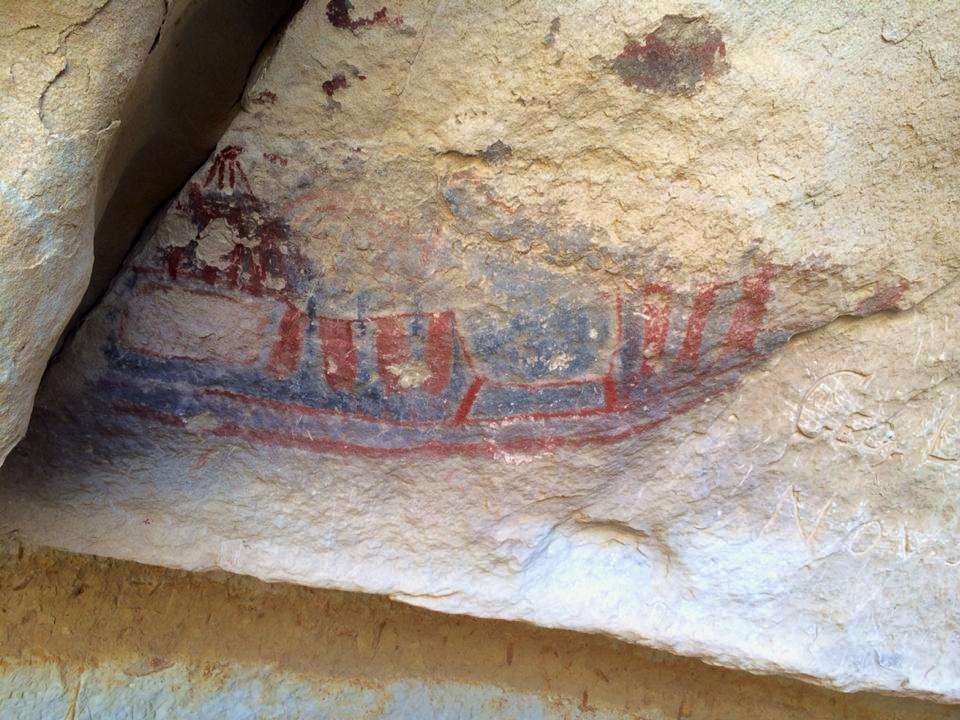

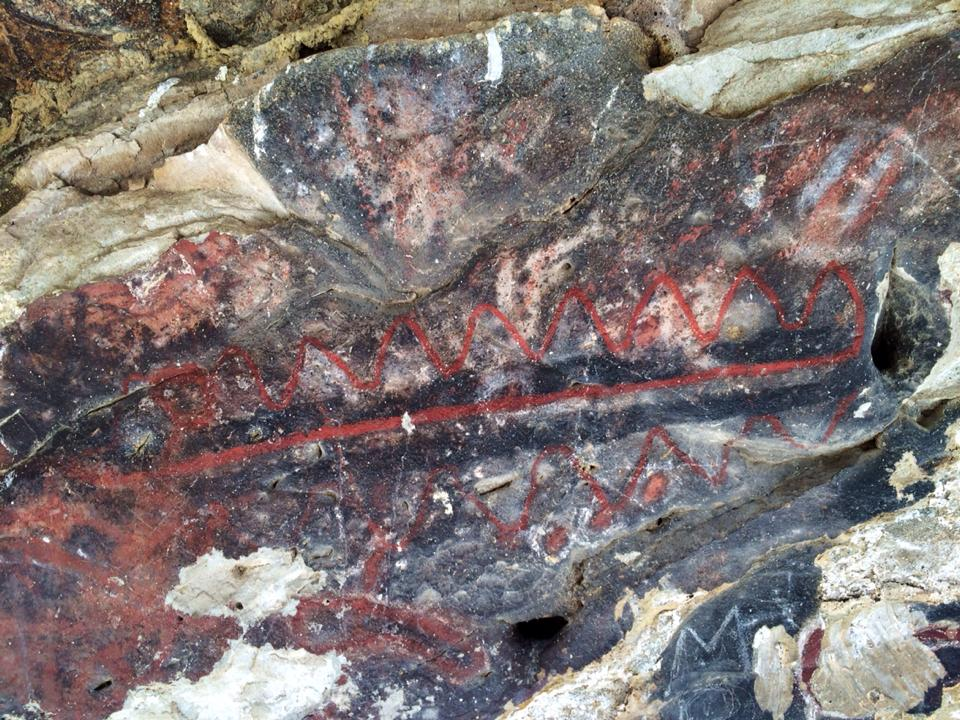

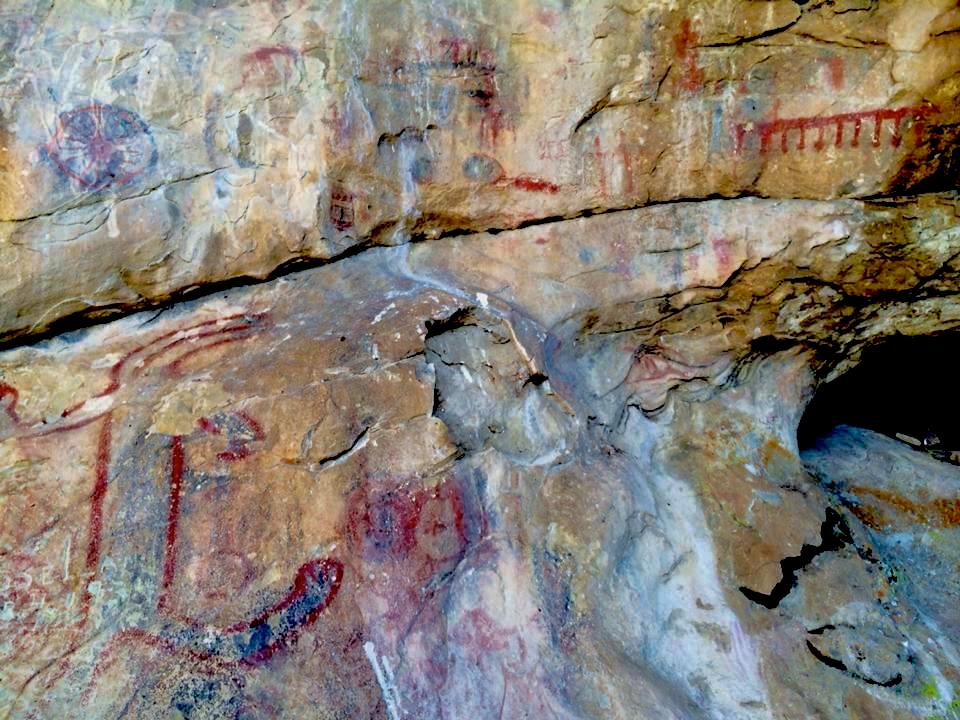

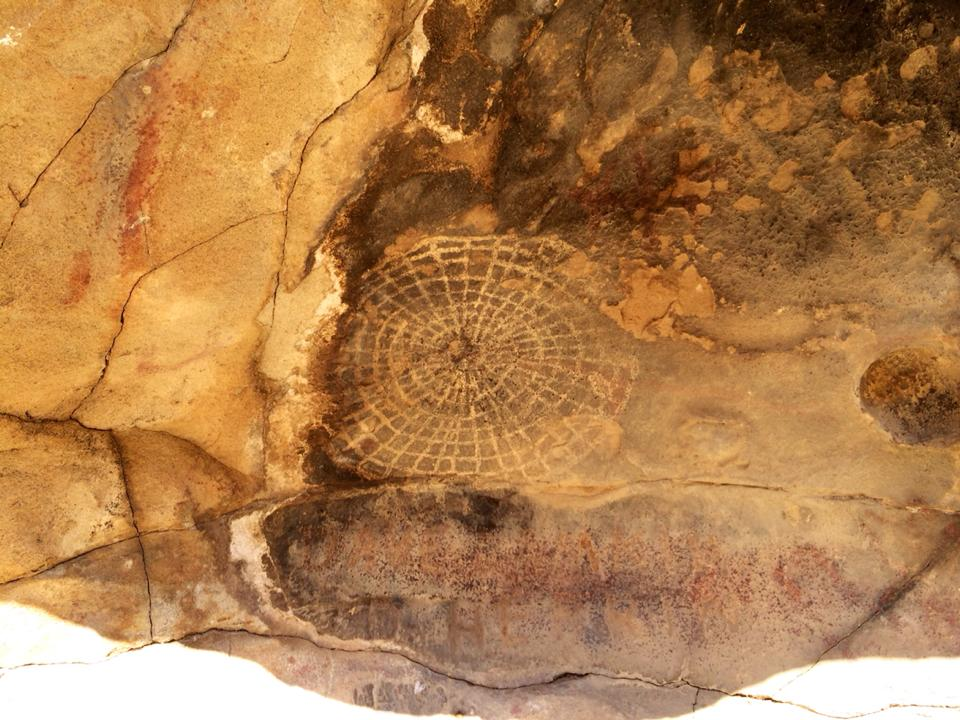

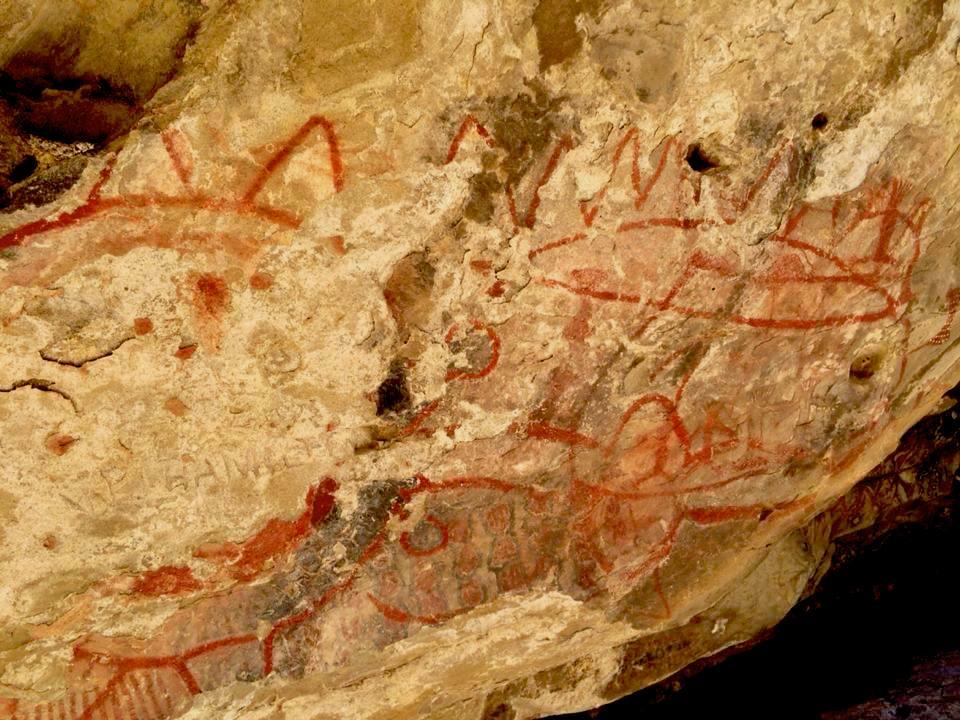

== See also ==
- Burro Flats Painted Cave
- California Valley Airport
- California Valley, California
- Carrizo Plain
- Chumash Painted Cave State Historic Park, California
- Chumash people
- Rock art of the Chumash people
- Shalawa Meadow, California
