= Paint Rock =

Paint Rock may refer to:

- Paint Rock, Alabama, town in Jackson County
- Paint Rock, Texas, town in Concho County
- Paint Rock River, tributary of the Tennessee River in northern Alabama

== See also ==
- Painted Rock (disambiguation)
