= Rock art of the Chumash people =

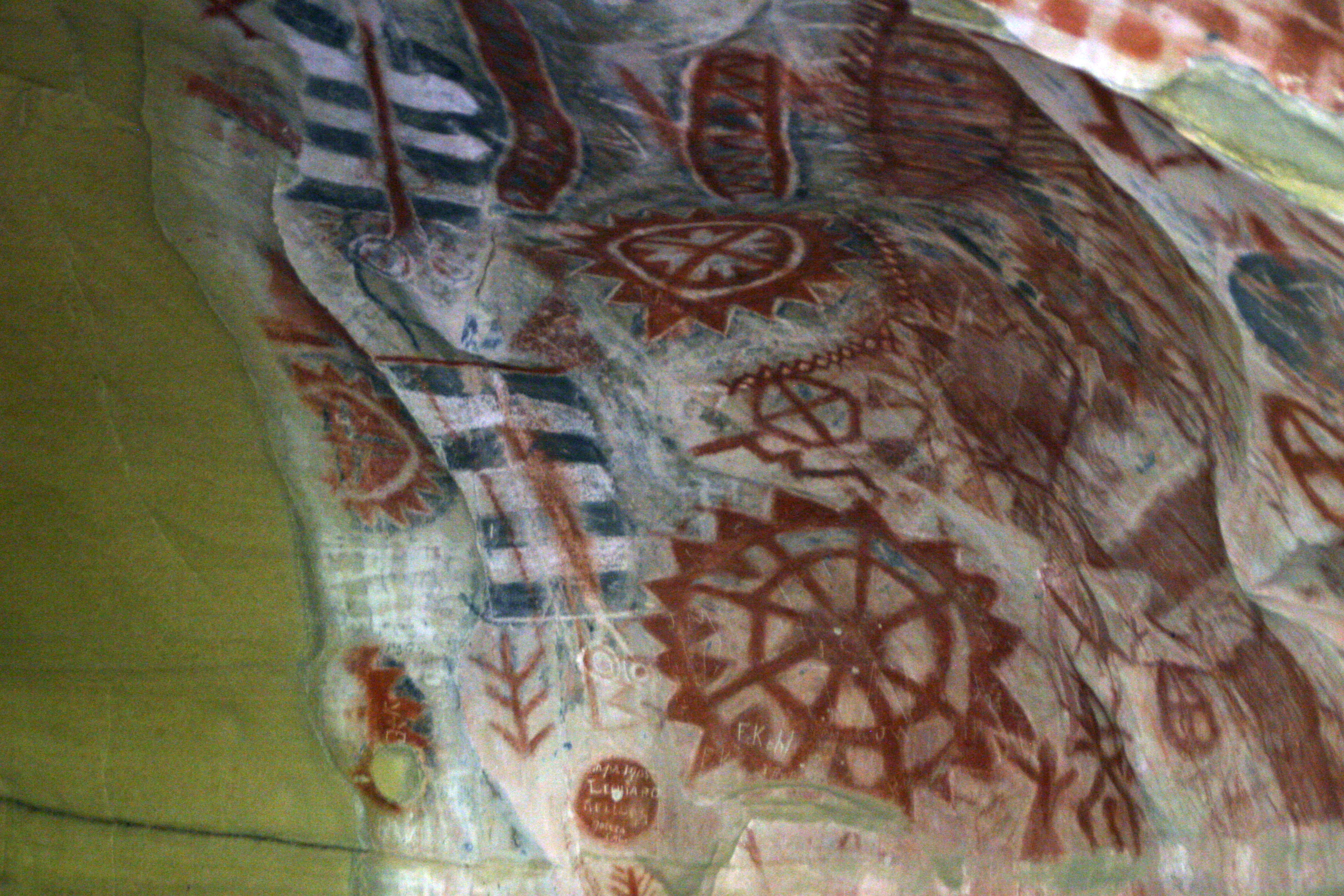
Painted Cave, Santa Barbara County, California

Chumash rock art is a genre of paintings on caves, mountains, cliffs, or other living rock surfaces, created by the Chumash people of Southern California. Pictographs and petroglyphs are common through interior California, the rock painting tradition thrived until the 19th century. Chumash rock art is considered to be some of the most elaborate and plentiful rock art tradition in the region.

The Chumash are probably best known for the pictographs, which were brightly colored paintings of humans, animals, and abstract circles. They were thought to be part of religious rituals and astrononomical events .

== Chumash people ==
The Chumash have lived in the present-day counties of Santa Barbara, Ventura, and San Luis Obispo in southern California for 14,000 years. They were a maritime, hunter-gatherer society whose livelihood was based on the sea. They developed excellent skills for catching fish, shellfish, and other marine mammals. Beyond fishing, however, they were also skilled in creating rock art. Hudson and Blackburn define rock art as "an aesthetic, symbolic representation of significant concepts and entities that is painted on or carved into a rock surface." Rock art may have been created by shamans during vision quests, most commonly in the form of pictographs (paintings on rock), but sometimes petroglyphs (engravings on rock) as well. No one is absolutely certain about the meaning of the Chumash Rock art, but scholars generally agree that it is connected with religion and astronomy.

Currently, the only federally recognized Chumash tribe are the Santa Ynez Band of Chumash Mission Indians. They have a cultural resource management team who protect and manage artifacts, landscapes and sacred places. According to the List of organizations that self-identify as Native American tribes, there are at least six other organizations that self-identify as Chumash, but there may be more.

== Locations ==
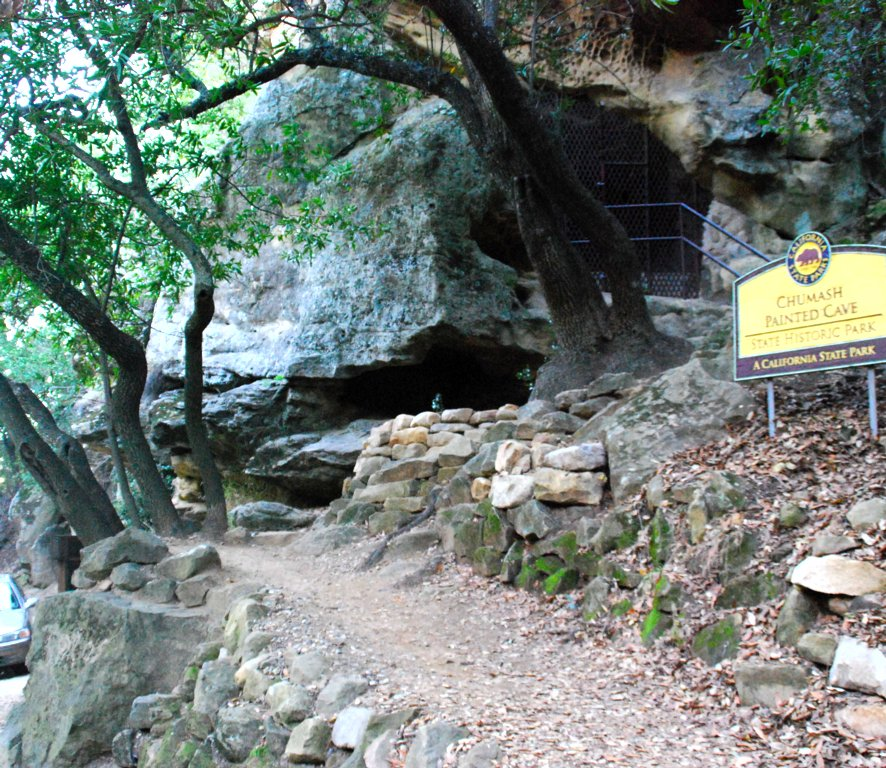
Exterior of Painted Cave

Chumash rock art is almost invariably found in caves or on cliffs in the mountains, although some small, portable painted rocks have been recorded by Campbell Grant. The rock art sites are always found near streams, springs, or some other source of permanent water. In his research of southern California rock art, Grant recorded numerous sites from different areas that were all close to a water source. He found twelve painted sites in the highest parts of the mountainous Chumash territory, the Ventureño area. The Ventura and Santa Clara Rivers and several coastal streams flow through this area. He also recorded forty-one painted rock art sites in the Cuyama Valley region (north of the Ventureño area), where the Sisquoc River flows between the San Rafael Mountains and the Sierra Madre Mountains. The most easily accessible example is at Painted Cave State Historic Park, which is located in canyons above Santa Barbara.

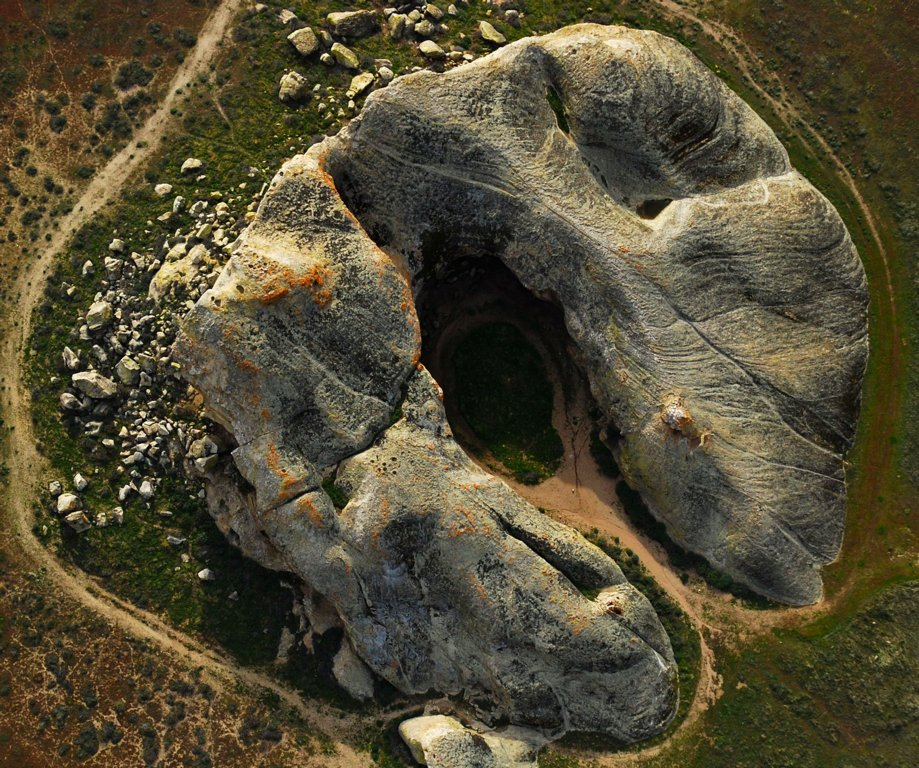
Aerial view of Painted Rock

Painted Rock is a free-standing rock on the Carrizo Plain near the Sierra Madre Mountains at the southern tip of the Great Central Valley. The interior alcove of the horseshoe-shaped rock features pictographs by Chumash, neighboring tribes, and non-Native Americans.

The Burro Flats Painted Cave petroglyphs are located in the Simi Hills in Ventura County. They are on the private land of Rocketdyne's Santa Susana Field Laboratory (SSFL), which has protected them from public harm since 1947. The SSFL is closed and in the initial stage of a significant toxins and radionuclides site investigation and cleanup. Boeing, U.S. DOE, and NASA (current property owners and responsible parties) and the California Department of Toxic Substances Control (DTSC) are responsible to protect Chumash and other historical elements during the extensive SSFL work.

The San Emigdio Rock Art Site is located near the San Emigdio Mountains in Kern County, California. The site consists of four cave shelters all adjacent to a creek. The cave shelters have elaborate and colorful rock art, all in a typical Chumash style. However, the rock art at the shelters displays more colors and is more complex than at any other Chumash site. Limited work continues to be done at this site due to deterioration.

Swordfish cave is on the land now occupied by Vandenberg Space Force Base. It is named after the swordfish petroglyph found in the cave. In the 1990's, it was obvious the art was deteriorating and needed preservation. The conservation efforts revealed new data about the human occupation of the cave. "They identified three periods of human use, including an initial occupation around 3,550 years ago, an occupation about 660 years later, and a final Native American occupation that occurred much later, between A.D. 1787 and 1804."

Indian Caves is located west of San Marcos Pass near San Jose Creek. The pictographs in the cave were first described by John V Frederick who teamed up with Julian Steward to have drawings of the pictographs published in his book, Petroglyphs of California and Adjoining States. The site contains several elaborate examples of zoomorphic style glyphs.

The rock art site named "House of the Two Suns" was first described by Dick Smith, a historian and naturalist. The site is on the land now known as Dick Smith Wilderness, where he did a majority of his work. There are several cave shelters located one above the other in a rock outcrop. The pictographs are red and black, possibly representing the sun during the summer and winter solstice.

== Religious aspects of art ==
Chumash traditional narratives in oral history say that religious specialists, known as 'alchuklash created the rock art. Non-Chumash people call these practitioners medicine men or shamans. According to David Whitley, shamanism is "a form of worship based on direct, personal interaction between a shaman (or medicine man) and the supernatural (or sacred realm and its spirits)." In Chumash territory, the sites for the vision quests were usually located near the shaman's village. The Chumash considered caves, rocks, and water sources quite powerful, and the shamans saw them as a "portal to the sacred realm...where they could enter the supernatural."

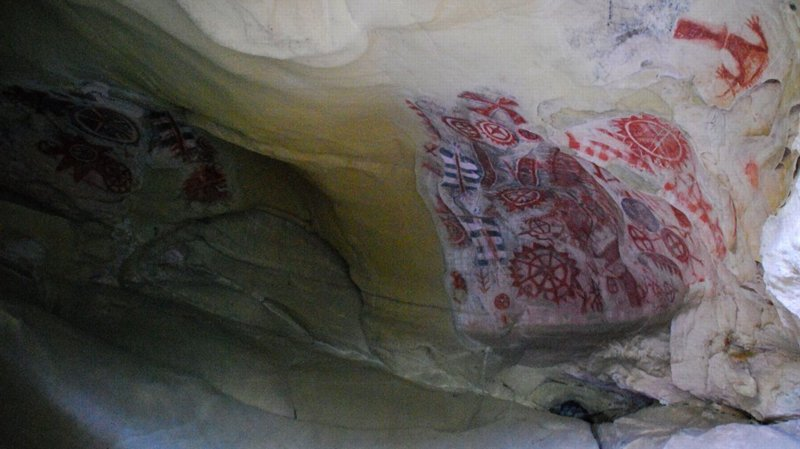
Interior of Painted Cave

The way a shaman interacted with the supernatural was by entering a hallucinogenic trance, or altered state of consciousness. In this altered state, brought on either by surprisingly potent native tobacco or jimsonweed, shamans received visions and supernatural power from spirit helpers often in the forms of dangerous and powerful animals like rattlesnakes and grizzly bears. Spirit helpers almost never took the form of an animal that was an important source of food, because it was 'taboo for a shaman to eat meat from the species of his helper.' The discovery of chewed quids (plant material chewed to extract a drug) in the ceiling of a site named Pinwheel Cave were identified as Datura wrightii. This match was the first confirmation of the consumption of an hallucinogen at any Chumash site (and possibly any in the world).

== Subject matter and materials ==
Chumash rock art depicts images like humans, animals, celestial bodies, and other (at times ambiguous) shapes and patterns. These depictions vary considerably and appear to be in no particular order or arrangement. The colors of the paintings vary as well, from red or black monochromes (different shades of a single color) to elaborate polychromes (many various colors). The Chumash made paint from a mixture of mineralized soil, stone mortar, and some kind of liquid binder like blood or oil from animals or mashed seeds. The addition of an oil binder helped to make the paint permanent and waterproof. Orange and red paint contained hematite or iron oxide, while yellow came from limonite, blue and green from copper or serpentine, white from kaolin clays or gypsum, and black from manganese or charcoal. Theories suggest that many of the minerals used in the pigments were sourced from a nearby hydrous copper quarry rich in various ores. Paint was applied with a person's finger or a brush. Grant organized the types of images depicted in the paintings into two categories: representational and abstract. Representational images include squares, circles and triangles, zigzags, crisscrosses, parallel lines, and pinwheels., Grant noted that in settled villages, abstract paintings were prominent, while the areas occupied by bands of hunting people reveal representational images.

== Interpretations ==
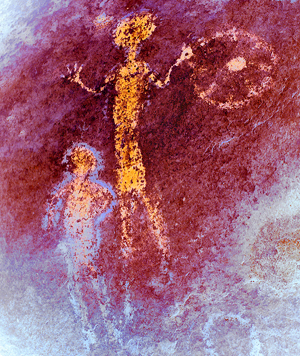
Color enhanced Chumash glyphs

In the early 20th century, non-Natives began studying California rock art, including a number of archaeologists, such as Julian Steward and Alfred Kroeber. Because of some commonly occurring symbols in paintings, it was believed that at least portions of the rock art depicted themes of fertility, water, and rain; however, the Native California Indians are very reluctant to talk to anyone about the rock art and some deny any knowledge of it altogether. The natives' hesitancy to discuss the art led archaeologists to believe that they had no idea of the origin of the pictographs. Kroeber recorded some of his thoughts on the origins of the rock art in 1925.

"The cave paintings of [Southern California]...represent a particular art, or local style or cult. This can be connected, in all probability, with the technological art of the Chumash. [An] association with...religion is also to be considered, although nothing positive is known in the matter. Many of the pictures may have been made by shamans; and it is quite possible that medicine men were not connected with the making of any."

Kroeber was unsure about what specific associations could be made between the paintings and the artists. Julian Steward researched California rock art as well, and in 1929 he deduced that the only way to understand the meanings of the petroglyphs and pictographs was to compare them with the art and symbolism of the different Indian groups and their respective culture areas. In his book Petroglyphs of California and Adjoining States, Steward wrote:

It has frequently been stated that the petroglyphs and pictographs are meaningless figures made in idle moments by some primitive artist. The facts of distribution, however, show that this cannot be true. Since design elements and style are grouped in limited areas, the primitive artist must have made the inscriptions with something in mind. ... He executed, not random drawings, but figures similar to those made in other parts of the same area.

At Painted Cave, a circle enclosing five spokes surrounded by other circles–some spoked, some rayed–is thought to represent the solar eclipse of November 24, 1677. Pinwheel shapes, dots, and concentric circles are believed to be celestial bodies. Other geometric shapes and patterns are believed to be depictions of "phosphenes" or images created by the brain after a long period of little visual stimuli.Figures combining human and animal features represent states of transformation the 'alchuklash experienced. Certain animals, such as rattlesnakes and frogs, are believed to represent spirit helpers.

There are several sites with archaeoastronomy interpretations of glyphs. The site at Painted Rock (San Luis Obispo County, California) has an arborglyph that looks like a lizard with what seems to be Polaris, the North Star and the constellation Ursa Major.

Condor cave in the San Rafael Mountains near Sisquoc River, has a cave entrance that lines up with the sun at dawn on the winter solstice. Inside the cave are motifs that are described as "a possible solar symbol".

== Arborglyph ==
In 2006, an arborglyph on an oak tree in the Santa Lucia Range in San Luis Obispo County was discovered to be Chumash art. The tree, locally known as the "scorpion tree," was originally believed to have been the work of cowboys. However, archaeologists believe it to be the only known Native American arborglyph in the western United States. The work on the tree is theorized to be correlated to the movement of celestial bodies. If true, it would demonstrate that Chumash art was likely used as astronomical calendars.

== Dating ==
Concerning the age of the paintings, Grant says "a radiocarbon test on pigment from a Santa Barbara area pictograph site showed that the sample was 'not over 2,000 years old.'"

== See also ==
- Painted Cave State Historic Park
- Burro Flats Painted Cave
- Painted Rock
