= Red Desert =

Red Desert may refer to:

- Red Desert (film), a 1964 Italian film
- Red Desert (1949 film), also known as Texas Manhunt
- Red Desert (Wyoming), a 6 million acre (24,000 km^{2}) high altitude desert in Wyoming
- Red Desert, a small desert near Port Edward, KwaZulu-Natal, South Africa.
- "Red Desert", a song on 5 Seconds of Summer's 2020 album Calm
