= Burro Flats site =

Archaeological site in California, United States

- Burro Flats Site
- U.S. National Register of Historic Places
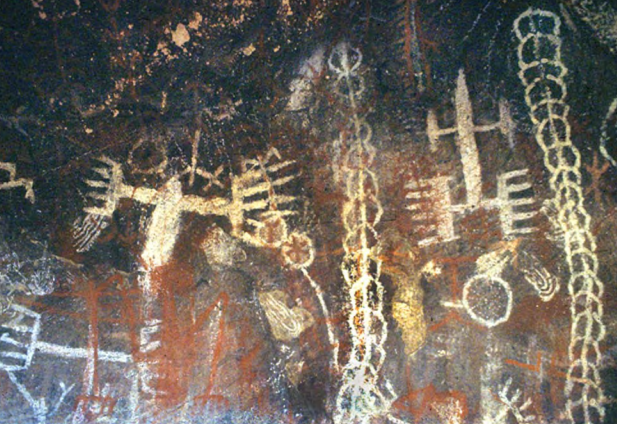
- Pictographs in the Burro Flats painted cave
- Location: Simi Hills, Ventura County, California, United States
- Nearest city: Bell Canyon, California
- Architect: Chumash people
- Architectural style: Pictograph Rock art
- NRHP reference No.: 76000539; 100004883 (decrease)

Significant dates
- Added to NRHP: May 5, 1976
- Boundary decrease: July 2, 2020

The Burro Flats Site is a painted cave site located near Burro Flats, in the Simi Hills of eastern Ventura County, California, United States. The Chumash-style "main panel" and the surrounding 25 acres were listed on the National Register of Historic Places in 1976, with a boundary decrease in 2020. The main panel includes dozens of pictographs in a variety of colors. The cave is in the mountains, near the bilingual Chumash/Fernandeno village of Huwam/Jucjauynga. The Burro Flats painted cave and the rest of the former Santa Susana Field Laboratory are not accessible to the public.

== Pictographs ==
Among the pictographs are two human figures wearing feathered headdresses. There are also "raked anthropomorph" motifs, possible comet figures, and many more naturalistic elements. The Burro Flats cave pictographs are some of the best-preserved Native American art in Southern California. Archaeologists estimate the paintings to be several hundred years old. The site was used to predict and celebrate the winter solstice. In 1971, Fernandeño Indians asked NASA (the property owner) to safeguard the site. At the time, Fernandeño tribal leader Rudy Ortega Sr. said, "We really know very little of our heritage. ... The paintings are one of the few physical links to our heritage. We hope one day to interpret their stories for our people."

Tribal leaders expressed concern about damage that could result from vandals or weather and asked NASA to enclose the cave in glass, but this was never done, in order to keep the site and surrounding area as pristine as possible. However, the site and surrounding area was fenced off, to keep unauthorized people out of the immediate area. In 1978, the pictographs were the subject of the documentary film, "Cave Paintings of the Chumash Indians." The Santa Susana Field Laboratory has been closed for many years and is undergoing a complex cleanup. Historical Resource studies and site protection are part of the process. Boeing transferred an easement to the North American Land Trust which requires their property to remain as open space and protected from residential and agricultural development by future owners. NASA has declared its part of the former Field Laboratory to be "excess government property" and will divest its holding, following area clean-up. Those acres will most likely become permanent open space also.

The Chumash tribe has requested the return of the site to the tribe. The Santa Ynez Chumash have suggested that the general area be renamed The Sky Valley/'Alapay a 'altuqipin Traditional Cultural Property, and the tribe has nominated the entire former Santa Susana Field Laboratory to the National Register of Historic Places (the nomination is pending, as of May 2019). In order to guard the pictographs, the exact location of the cave is kept secret. Archeologists are allowed to occasionally visit the site for research purposes only – no casual visitors are allowed, and only members of the local Native American community are granted regular access.

== History ==
The Sky Valley/Burro Flats area was part of the Rancho San José de Nuestra Senora de Altagracia y Simi, and was used exclusively for cattle and sheep grazing throughout the Spanish and Mexican periods, and well into the American Period, until the mid-20th Century. The Josiah D. Whitney Expedition arrived in February 1861. They were exploring and mapping California which had been acquired by the United States a decade earlier. Whitney himself was not with the group, which was led by William H. Brewer. Brewer's history of his explorations can be found in "Up and Down California in 1860–1864" (2003:45-46 University of California Press). Brewer's party explored a large area in a short amount of time, and he does not specifically mention any native "rock art." The first non-native person known to have visited the site was Walter Brinkop, who was a member of the Pierre Agoure family, for whom the Agoura Hills area is named. Brinkop made several simple field sketches of the cave art in 1914, and he presented his drawings to Dr. Hector Alliott, the then Director of the Southwest Indian Museum, in Los Angeles. Almost 40 years later, the Archaeological Survey Association of Southern California (ASASC) performed extensive archaeological excavations at the site. The thousands of artifacts recovered are at the Autry Museum of the American West. At about the same time Brinkop visited, members of the local Native American community told the anthropologist John Peabody Harrington that there had been "a very large rancheria" at Burro Flats, and that "There are painted caves" near the old village (John P. Harrington Fernandeno Reel 106 notes; transcripts of Harrington's 19-teen notes were not published until 1986). In 1939 the Burro Flats area was acquired by the Henry Silvernale and William Hall families, who named their property "Sky Valley Ranch." Area historic research by Bob Edberg has shown that William Hall's family was familiar with the local Native American community, and it is likely that the local Native American community continued to have access to the area, at least until Sky Valley Ranch was acquired by North American Aviation (the predecessor to the Santa Susana Field Laboratory) in 1954. Indeed, it is quite possible that the name "Sky Valley" may be an English translation of the old Indian name for the Burro Flats area.

The polychrome "main panel" paintings came to the attention of the general public due to the work of the ASASC. This was largely due to two of the crew members: the artist Charles La Monk, who made full-scale reproductions of several of the paintings, and who published a short report on his work in 1953, and Gordon Redtfeldt, who made several field sketches at this time. La Monk's paintings and Redtfeldt's sketches were circulated in the archaeological community, and knowledge of the existence of the site and the paintings began to spread. In 1959–1960, Dr. Charles Rozaire performed the first general survey of the area and he recorded eleven more-or-less distinct "sites." These were given the State of California site numbers CA-VEN-151 to CA-VEN-161; the Burro Flats painted cave itself thus became CA-VEN-160. Rozaire also performed new excavations in the same area where the ASASC had worked some years earlier. This was at what Rozaire had recorded as CA-VEN-151. These two "sites" are adjacent to each other, but are distinct; there was no archaeological deposit in the painted cave, the floor of which is bedrock. The artifacts that Rozaire recovered were added to the ASASC collections, and they are now also in the possession of the Autry Museum. Of the Burro Flats cave art, Rozaire noted that they are most like "those in the west-central coast ranges of Santa Barbara, Kern, Los Angeles, and Ventura counties." As such, the painting were composed in what is now called the Chumash-style. This was confirmed by the noted rock art expert, Campbell Grant, who visited the site in the mid-1960s. Grant recorded the main panel in detail and gave it his number Ventura-4, and he described it as his Ventureno (i.e. Eastern Chumash) type site (see Rock Paintings of the Chumash 1965). The area was examined again in 1973 by the archaeologist Franklin Fenenga, who consolidated all 11 of Rozaire's "sites" into a single large site, although Rozaire's 11 "site" numbers continued to be cited by many researchers. Fenenga said that, "Because of its magnitude, the complex of features which are integral to it, the dramatic physiographic location, the unmodified natural landscape, and the fine state of preservation [it is] one of the major examples of aboriginal American art, one of the most important archaeological sites in America [i.e. in the United States] and it certainly meets the criteria for inclusion in the National Register of Historic Places." The area that was first described by Rozaire in the 1960s, and later by Fenenga in 1973, was listed on the National Register in 1976. The listing is called "Burro Flats Painted Cave," which is of itself actually only one site-locus. The 25 acres that were listed include at least 24 loci, many of which include pictographs, petroglyphs, and cupules. In the border reduction, it is referred to as the "Burro Flats Site".

The work by the ASASC, Rozaire, Grant, and Fenenga, focused on and described the Burro Flats cave art and the archaeological components of the site. The research begun in 1979, by the archaeologist John Romani, Edwin Krupp (the Director of the Griffith Observatory), and others, showed that the site (complex) was utilized to predict and observe both the winter and summer solstices. This fact about its past use attracted peoples' attention, and generated a new level of interest in the site.

Additional research in the early 1990s refined previous descriptions of the 25-acre National Register of Historic Places-listed site complex, which was re-recorded, generally following Fenenga's 1973 definition of the site boundaries, as CA-VEN-1072. The Burro Flats "main panel" (i.e. Rozaire's CA-VEN-160) thus became CA-VEN-1072, Locus 10.

== In popular culture ==
Burro Flats is a point of interest in the video game Grand Theft Auto 5 by Rockstar Studios.

== See also ==
- Chumash Painted Cave State Historic Park
- History of the San Fernando Valley
- National Register of Historic Places listings in Ventura County, California
- Painted Rock (San Luis Obispo County, California)
- Rock art of the Chumash people
