= Soda Lake (San Luis Obispo County) =

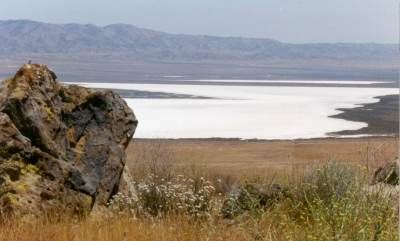

- Location within California
- Location: Carrizo Plain National Monument, San Luis Obispo County, California, US
- Coordinates: 35°13′52″N 119°53′18″W
- Type: alkali lake
- Basin countries: United States
- Surface area: 12 km^{2} (4.6 sq mi)
- Surface elevation: 580 m (1,900 ft)

Soda Lake is a shallow, ephemeral, alkaline endorheic lake in the Carrizo Plain in southeastern San Luis Obispo County, California. The lake is located on the southwest side of the northern Carrizo Plain, 103 km (64 mi) east of San Luis Obispo. It can be reached by Soda Lake Road, which runs northwest–southeast between State Route 166 and State Route 58. The lake is at an elevation of 580 m (1,900 ft) and covers an area of about 12 km^{2} (4.6 sq mi).

== Endorheic drainage basin ==
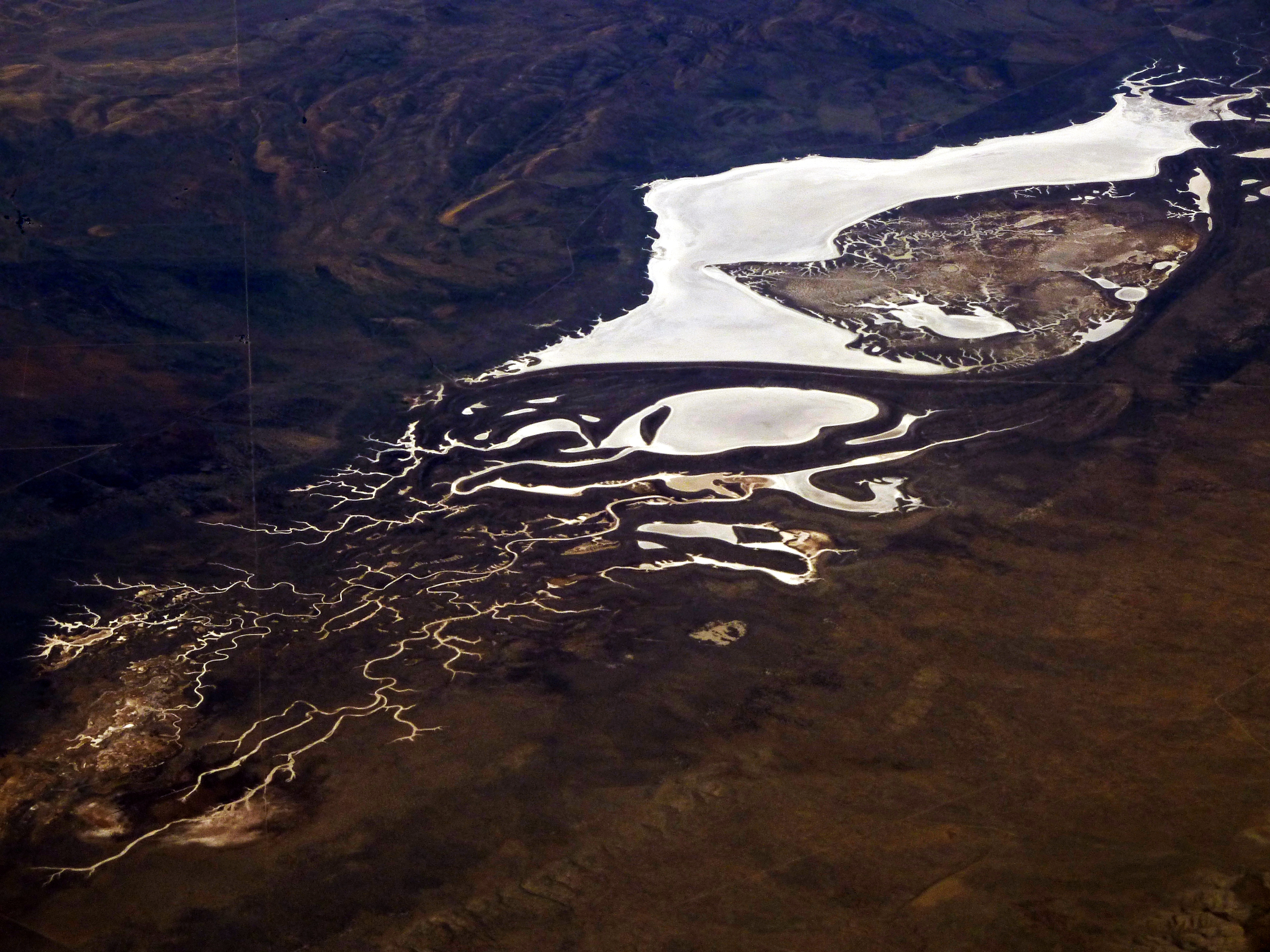
Aerial view of Soda Lake

Internal drainage of the Carrizo Plain and the formation of Soda Lake began during Pliocene-Pleistocene time when tectonic deformation associated with the San Andreas Fault defeated a stream that once drained the valley. An originally fresh to brackish water lake probably persisted through much of the Pleistocene during which coastal California was wetter and cooler than now. Diminished Holocene precipitation and a higher evaporation rate led to shrinkage of the ancestral lake and associated increased salinity which set the stage for clay dune formation.

About 30% of the closed or endorheic drainage basin is to the north of the lake and 70% is south of it. The Soda Lake complex consists of two larger basins, and at least 130 smaller pans. The large L-shaped northern basin is about 10.5 km^{2} (4.1 sq mi) in area. The remaining basins, including both those that feed the northern basin and those that have no surface outlets, comprise an area of about 4.8 km^{2} (1.9 sq mi). Water levels in the basins rise and fall seasonally. Rainfall on the Carrizo Plain is only about 20 cm (7.9 in) in an average year but is higher on the surrounding mountains. Following exceptionally wet winters, typically El Niño years, the large northern and southern basins do not evaporate completely, although the water retreats toward the center of the basin leaving a salt crust up to 20 cm (7.9 in) thick. Most of the large and small pans are fringed by clay dunes. It is one of the largest alkali wetlands remaining in natural condition in California. It supports fairy and brine shrimp, as well as migratory and nesting birds. A boardwalk was built along the shore to prevent damage to the saltbush habitat that borders the lake.

== Climate ==
Climate data for Soda Lake, California
Month	Jan	Feb	Mar	Apr	May	Jun	Jul	Aug	Sep	Oct	Nov	Dec	Year
Mean daily maximum °F (°C)	62 (17)	62 (17)	67 (19)	71 (22)	78 (26)	87 (31)	92 (33)	93 (34)	89 (32)	79 (26)	69 (21)	61 (16)	76 (25)
Mean daily minimum °F (°C)	34 (1)	35 (2)	37 (3)	38 (3)	42 (6)	47 (8)	52 (11)	51 (11)	52 (11)	43 (6)	37 (3)	33 (1)	42 (6)
Average precipitation inches (mm)	5.03 (128)	4.92 (125)	4.09 (104)	1.45 (37)	0.60 (15)	0.09 (2.3)	0.01 (0.25)	0.00 (0.00)	0.11 (2.8)	1.12 (28)	1.80 (46)	3.83 (97)	23.05 (585.35)
Source: prism

== Dunes ==
The largest dune bounds the eastern and southern edges of the northern basin. This dune is up to 470 m (1,540 ft) wide, 16.7 m (55 ft) high, and nearly 9.5 km (5.9 mi) in length. Part of the dune is active, receiving sediment from the mud flat exposed between the dune and the salt pan. Most of the eastern (north-south) leg of the dune, which is lower and narrower, is currently inactive. Westward retreat of the shoreline exposed the former lake flat to colonization and stabilization by salt-resistant plants.

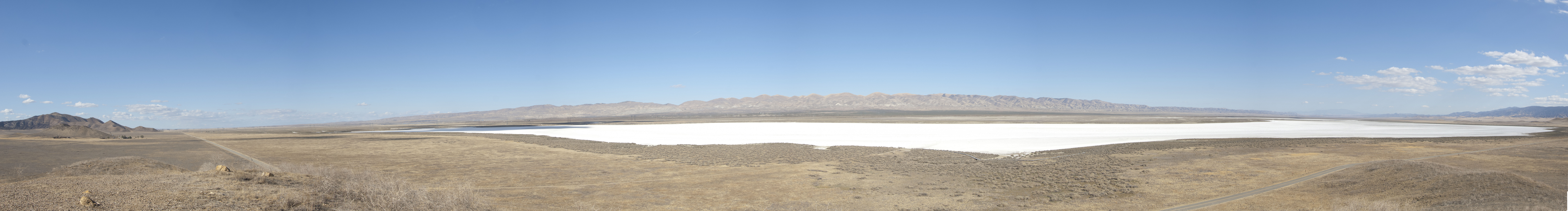
Panoramic view of Soda Lake

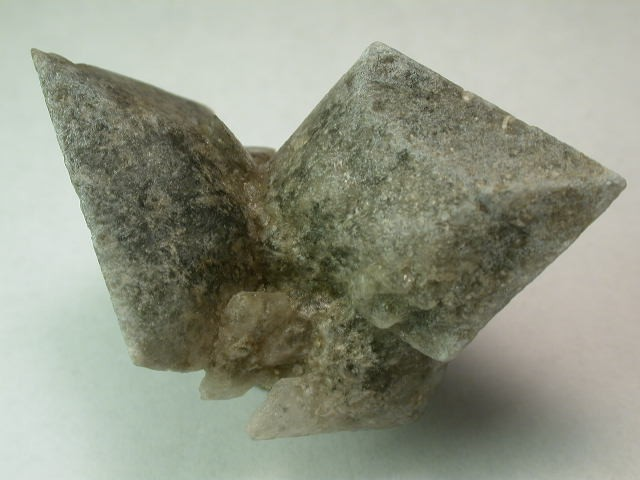
Thenardite, an anhydrous sodium sulfate mineral from Soda Lake

== See also ==
- List of lakes of California
