= Superbloom =

Botanical phenomenon

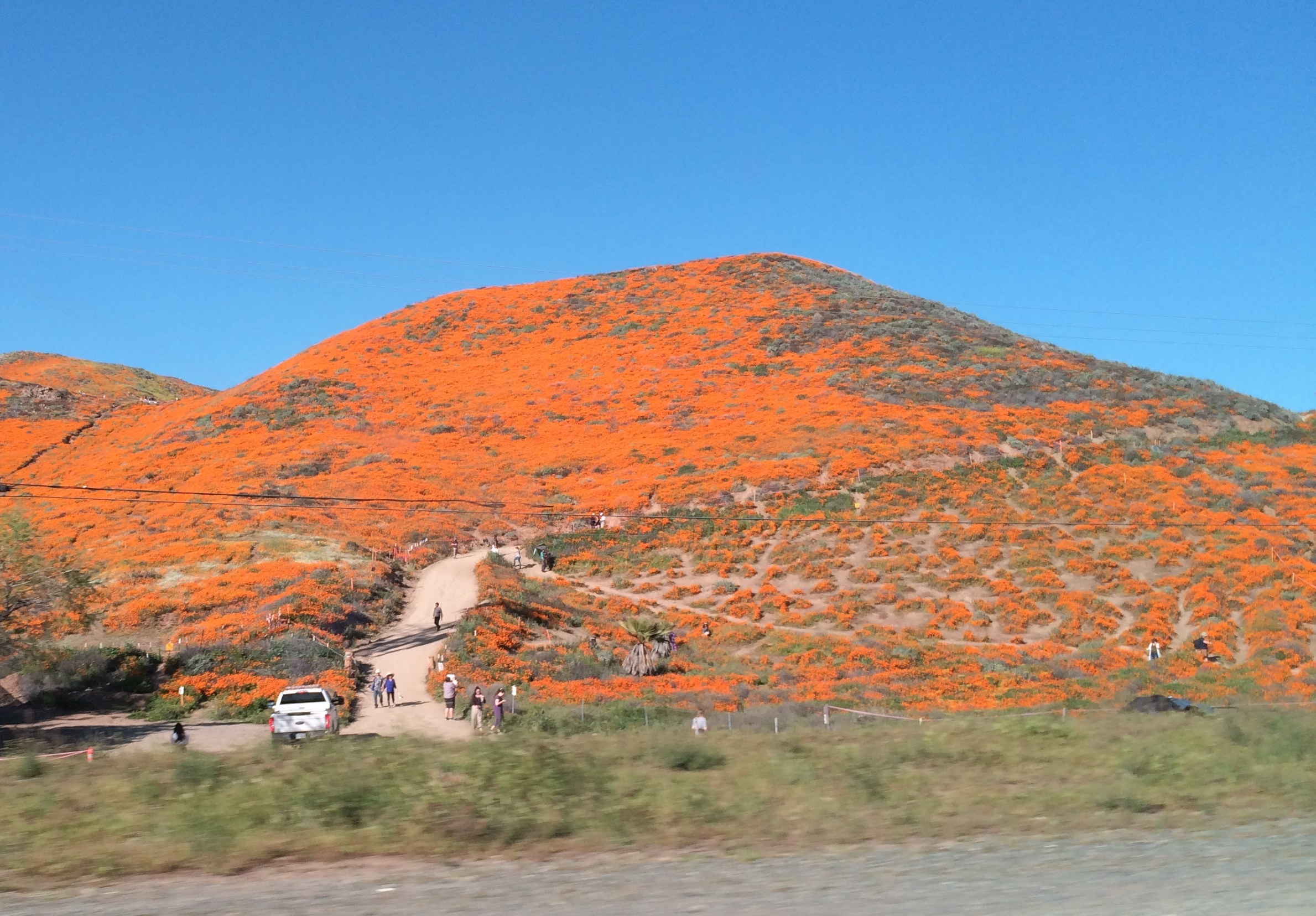
Superbloom in Riverside County, California in 2019

A superbloom is a rare desert botanical phenomenon, where an unusually large proportion of wildflowers whose seeds have lain dormant in desert soil germinate and blossom at roughly the same time. The phenomenon is associated with an unusually wet rainy season. The term may have developed as a label in the 1990s.

It occurs mostly in California, Arizona, and Nevada, but a similar phenomenon also occurs annually during the wet season along the arid west coast of South Africa between Cape Town and Namaqualand; notably at nature reserves such as the West Coast National Park and Goegap Nature Reserve.

Additionally, superblooms occur in the Western Australia desert, as well as the Atacama Desert in Chile.

== Necessary conditions and sequence of events ==
The conditions under which a superbloom can occur are exceptional. Because some invasive grasses, such as bromes, will compete with native flowers for moisture, the desert must remain dry enough prior to the bloom to keep them from becoming established. The desert must receive rainfall in the autumn, and this rain must penetrate deep into the soil matrix in order to reach a majority of the dormant seeds of flowering plants. If subsequent rainfall is excessive or inundating, the young plants may be carried away in flash floods; if it is inadequate, the seeds will die from dehydration.

Following the autumnal rainfall, the ground must slowly warm over the next several months. During this time, there must be sufficient cloud cover both to shield the soil from daytime heat and to insulate it from freezing temperatures during the night. Finally, as the newly germinated plants reach the surface of the soil, there must be an absence of strong winds which could damage the shoots and uproot the plants. The rare occurrence of these events one after the other makes a superbloom an infrequent occurrence.

In California, superblooms typically occur once every ten years or so. This has happened less often since the beginning of the 21st century due to persistent state drought. Anza-Borrego Park and Carrizo Plain National Monument are some of the most popular places to witness a superbloom, and the bloom of 2019 was particularly abundant. This followed another only two years prior, in 2017.

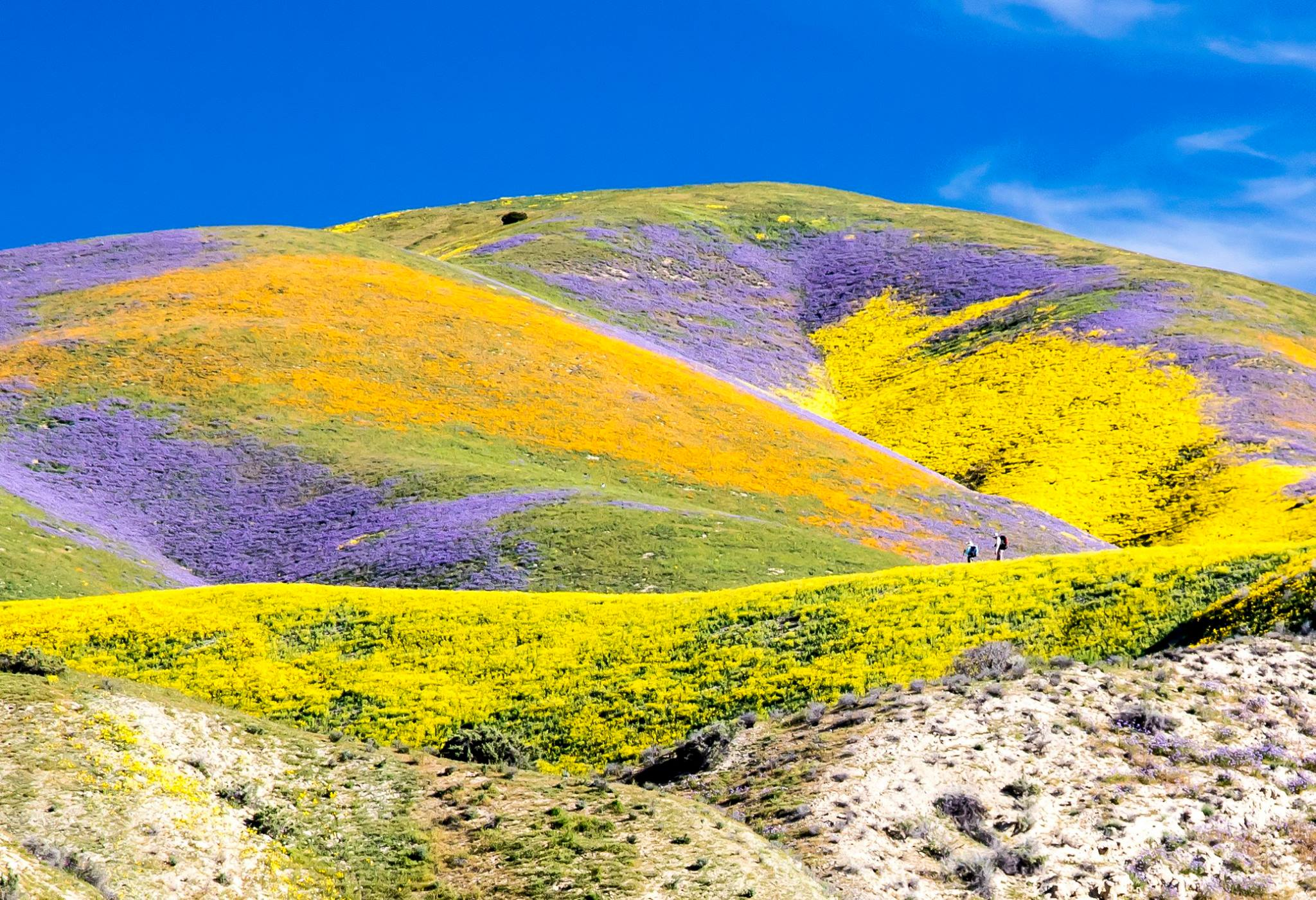
Carrizo Plain National Monument in 2017

In the Mojave Desert of southeastern California, common plant species which compose the superblooms are brittlebushes (Encelia farinosa; yellow flowers), California poppies (Eschscholzia californica; bright orange), desert bluebells (Phacelia campanularia; deep purple), lupines (purple), sand verbena (Abronia; yellow), desert sunflowers (Geraea canescens; bright yellow), evening primroses (Camissonia brevipes; mostly white, occasionally yellow), popcorn flowers (Plagiobothrys; white or yellow), and desert lilies (Hesperocallis; white). Several of these plants are also invasive, such as wild mustard.

At Carrizo Plain in California, different annual plant species compose color patches of the hills (Temblor Range and Caliente Range) and the valley floor (Soda Lake). Dominant color patches of hills are bright yellow (Monolopia lanceolata, Caulanthus inflatus), purple (Phacelia tanacetifolia), magenta/dark pink (Castilleja exserta), and orange (Eschscholzia californica, Mentzelia pectinata). Dominant color patches of the valley floor are golden yellow (Monolopia stricta, Leptosyne calliopsidea), pale yellow (Layia munzii), purple (Phacelia ciliata), and light pink (Streptanthus anceps).

=== Climate change effects ===
Scientists worry that superblooms could become less common as rainfall varies and winter droughts become more frequent because of climate change. Additionally, more variable storms and a disruption to longstanding weather patterns, caused by climate change, may disrupt wildflower superblooms in California.However, superblooms may also become more remarkable and longer lasting as the time between each bloom increases, allowing for more wildflower seeds to lay dormant for longer.

=== Tourism effects ===
Superblooms increase public awareness of California's rural federal public lands and the state's rich floristic diversity. It can also have a positive, although brief, effect on the local rural economy. Too much public visitation in such a short time period, however, can have negative impacts. In 2019, massive traffic jams prompted Lake Elsinore, California, to shut down access to Walker Canyon, a major access route for viewing the superbloom. Dense concentrations of visitors walking off-trail can cause damage or uproot the plants.

The 2023 California super bloom followed a few months of wetter than average weather. The superbloom phenomenon was large enough to be seen from space by NASA's Landsat 9 satellite and has attracted many visitors.

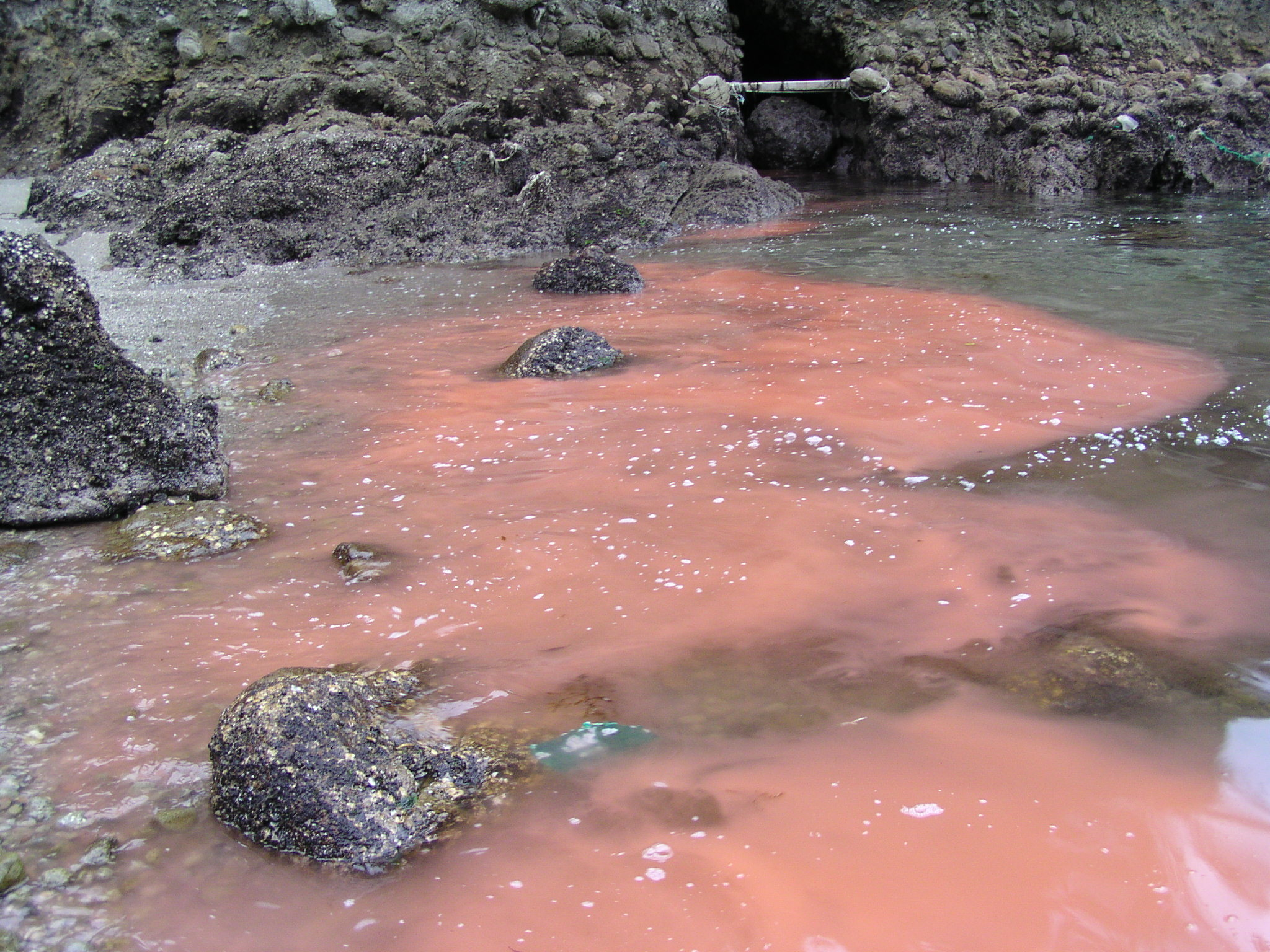
Algal bloom (赤潮 akashio, "red tide") by Noctiluca in Nagasaki

== Algal superblooms ==
Because algae often reproduce in large sporadic bouts, referred to as algal blooms, the term "superbloom" is sometimes applied to especially prolific short-term algal growth that causes discoloration of water on a large scale. Other than sharing a botanical context, however, the two events have nothing in common.

== In popular culture ==
- Comedian Darryl Lenox named his 2021 album Super Bloom after the botanical phenomenon.
- Band Misterwives named their 2020 album Superbloom, inspired by the resilience it takes to get through heartbreak to emerge on the other side of it finding your way back to something beautiful.
- Metalcore band Silent Planet named their 2023 album SUPERBLOOM after the botanical phenomenon.
- The branding and 'look' of the Los Angeles 2028 Olympics took its inspiration from the colors of the superbloom.

== See also ==
- Desert bloom
