= E. nivea =

E. nivea may refer to:

- Eatonella nivea, a plant species
- Eremophila nivea, the silky eremophila, a shrub species native to Western Australia

== See also ==
- Nivea (disambiguation)
