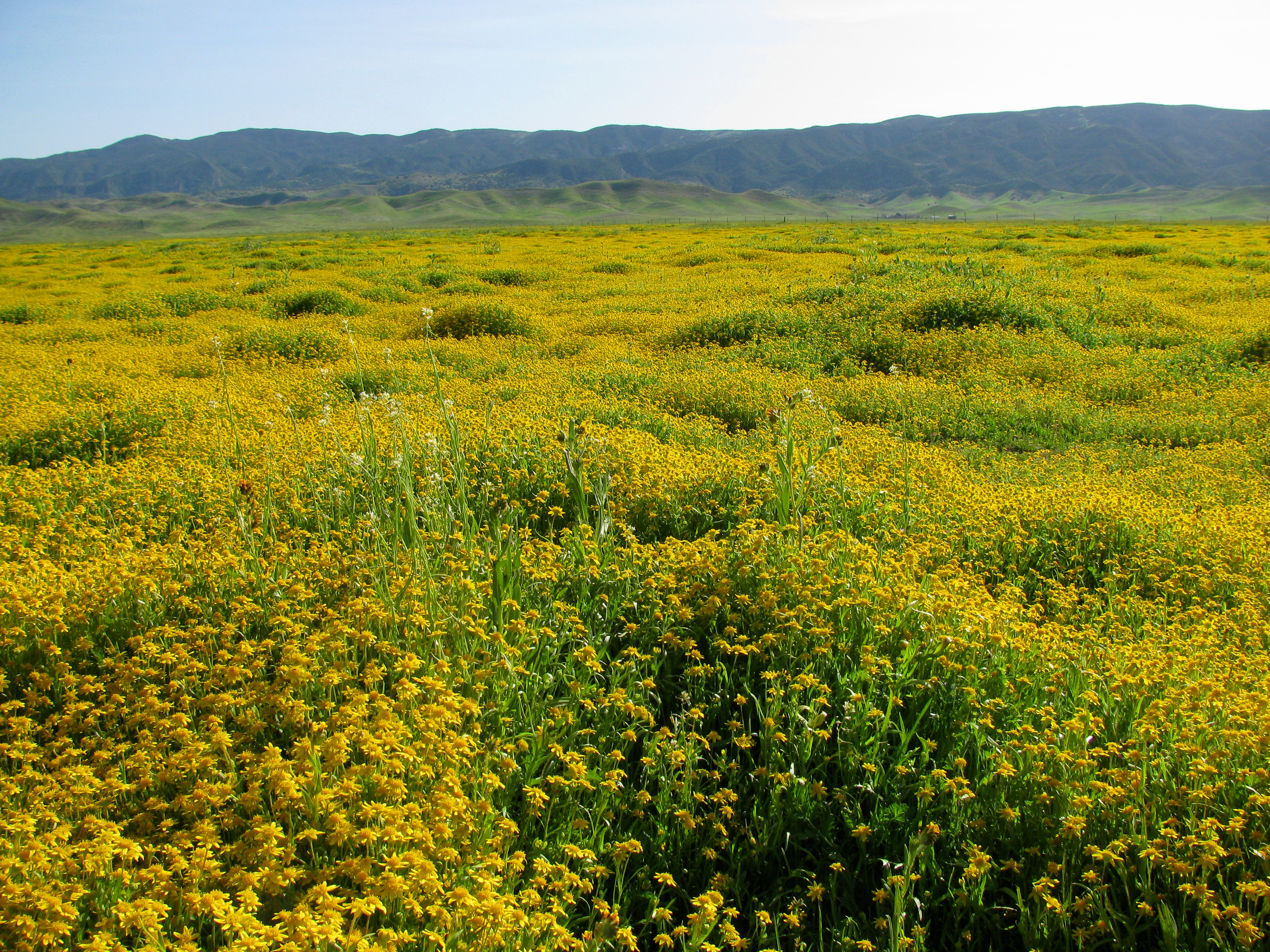

Scientific classification
- Kingdom: Plantae
- Clade: Tracheophytes
- Clade: Angiosperms
- Clade: Eudicots
- Clade: Asterids
- Order: Asterales
- Family: Asteraceae
- Genus: Monolopia
- Species: M. major

Binomial name
- Monolopia major DC.

= Monolopia major =

Species of flowering plant

Monolopia major is a species of flowering plant in the family Asteraceae known by the common name cupped monolopia.

== Distribution ==
Monolopia major is endemic to Central California with known extant populations in the Inner North Coast Ranges and Inner South Coast Ranges. The species is frequently confused with Monolopia lanceolata, with the two being very similar in appearance. The two can be distinguished by M. major having fused phyllaries - fused into a cup; most obvious at after senescence and fruits have dispersed. In comparison, M. lanceolata has free phyllaries. Due to woolly hairs on the phyllaries obscuring the free phyllary margins, they may appear fused, but gentle separation reveals that they are free. Other differences in the species are that the rays of M. major appear a pure, vibrant yellow, whereas the rays of M. lanceolata are a lighter yellow that often appears faded near the tips.

Monolopia major has very high to strict edaphic affinity for clay soils, particularly vertic clay (smectite; montmorillonite) soils. M. lanceolata typically may grow on all soil textures from sandy to clayey, but M. major only grows on clayey soils. M. major appears to only occur where average annual precipitation is greater than about 11 inches per year (chaparral, blue oak woodland), whereas M. lanceolata can occur at average annual precipitation greater than 11 inches per year, but also at precipitation levels as low as 6 inches per year (San Joaquin Valley Desert; saltbrush scrub). Most known large populations of M. major are distributed around San Benito Mountain in southern San Benito County.

== Description ==
Monolopia major is an annual herb producing a slender, sometimes branching stem up to about 80 centimeters tall. It is usually somewhat woolly in texture.

The inflorescences at the ends of stem branches bear small hemispheric flower heads with fused phyllaries. The golden, yellow, or cream-colored ray florets are up to 2 centimeters long and have three-lobed tips. They surround a center of many disc florets.

The fruit is an achene about 2 to 4 millimeters long.
