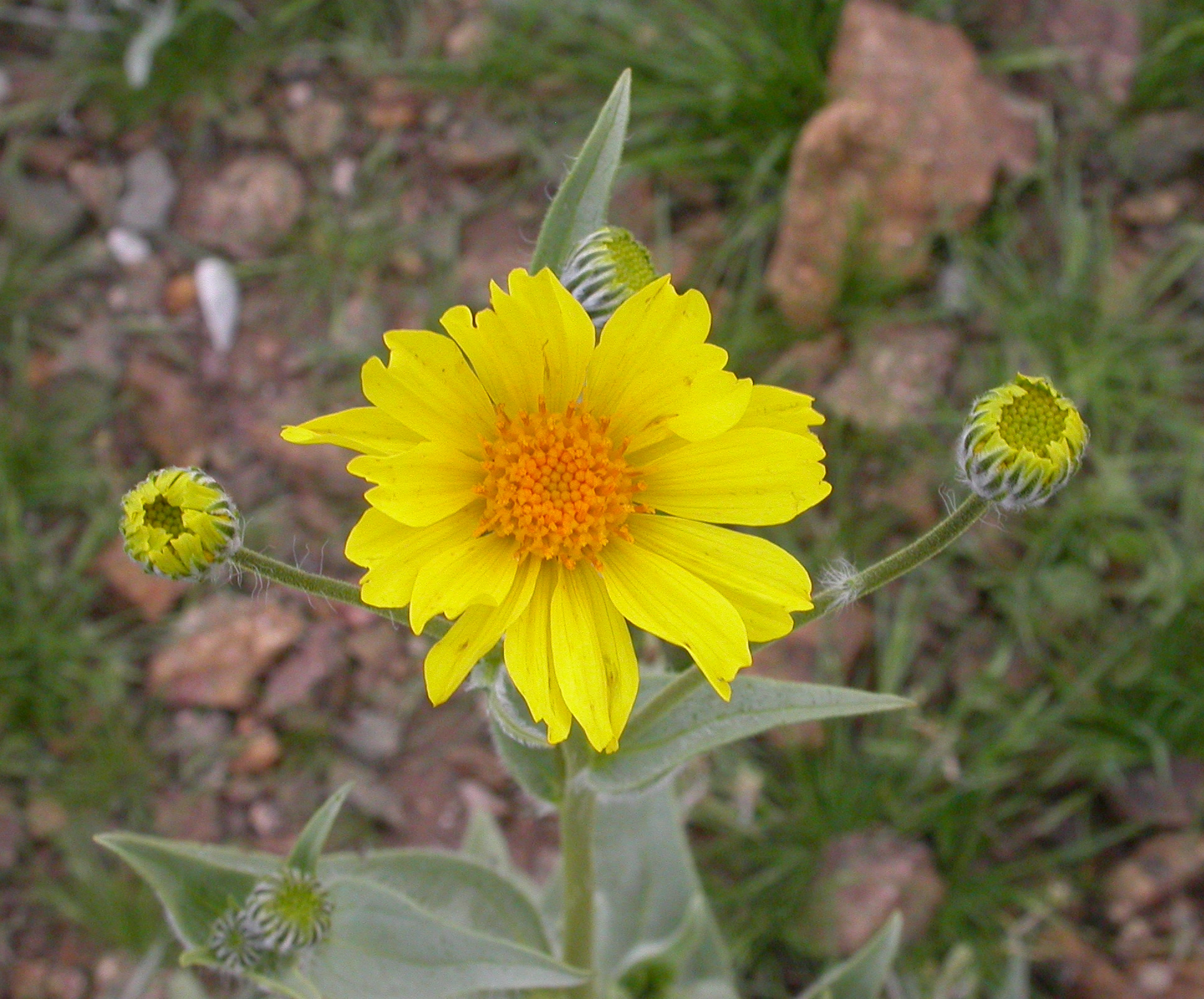

Scientific classification
- Kingdom: Plantae
- Clade: Embryophytes
- Clade: Tracheophytes
- Clade: Angiosperms
- Clade: Eudicots
- Clade: Asterids
- Order: Asterales
- Family: Asteraceae
- Tribe: Heliantheae
- Genus: Geraea
- Species: G. canescens

Binomial name
- Geraea canescens Torr. & Gray

Synonyms
- Encelia eriocephala A.Gray; Simsia canescens (Torr. & A. Gray) A. Gray

= Geraea canescens =

Species of flowering plant

Geraea canescens, commonly known as desert sunflower, hairy desert sunflower, or desert gold, is an annual plant in the family Asteraceae. The genus name comes from the Greek geraios ("old man"), referring to the white hairs on the fruits.

G. canescens bears yellow sunflower-like flowers on slender, hairy stems. It grows 0.30–0.91 metres (1–3 feet) high. The leaves are gray-green and grow to 8 centimetres (3 inches) long. It flowers February through May after sufficient rainfall, and sometimes in October and November. The flowers are 5 cm (2 in) wide with 10–20 ray florets, which are each about 2 cm (3/4 in) long.

The plant is native to western North America, specifically Arizona, Nevada, California, and Utah. A drought-resistant annual plant, it can be found in the California, Mojave, and Sonoran Deserts. It grows below sea level, from −40 to 1,130 m (−130 to 3,700 ft), in sandy desert soils along with creosote bush (Larrea tridentata). It is one of the flowers which participates in the occasional superblooms of desert flowers.

There are two varieties:

- Geraea canescens var. canescens
- Geraea canescens var. paniculata S.F.Blake

The flowers attract bees and birds, and the seeds are eaten by birds and rodents.

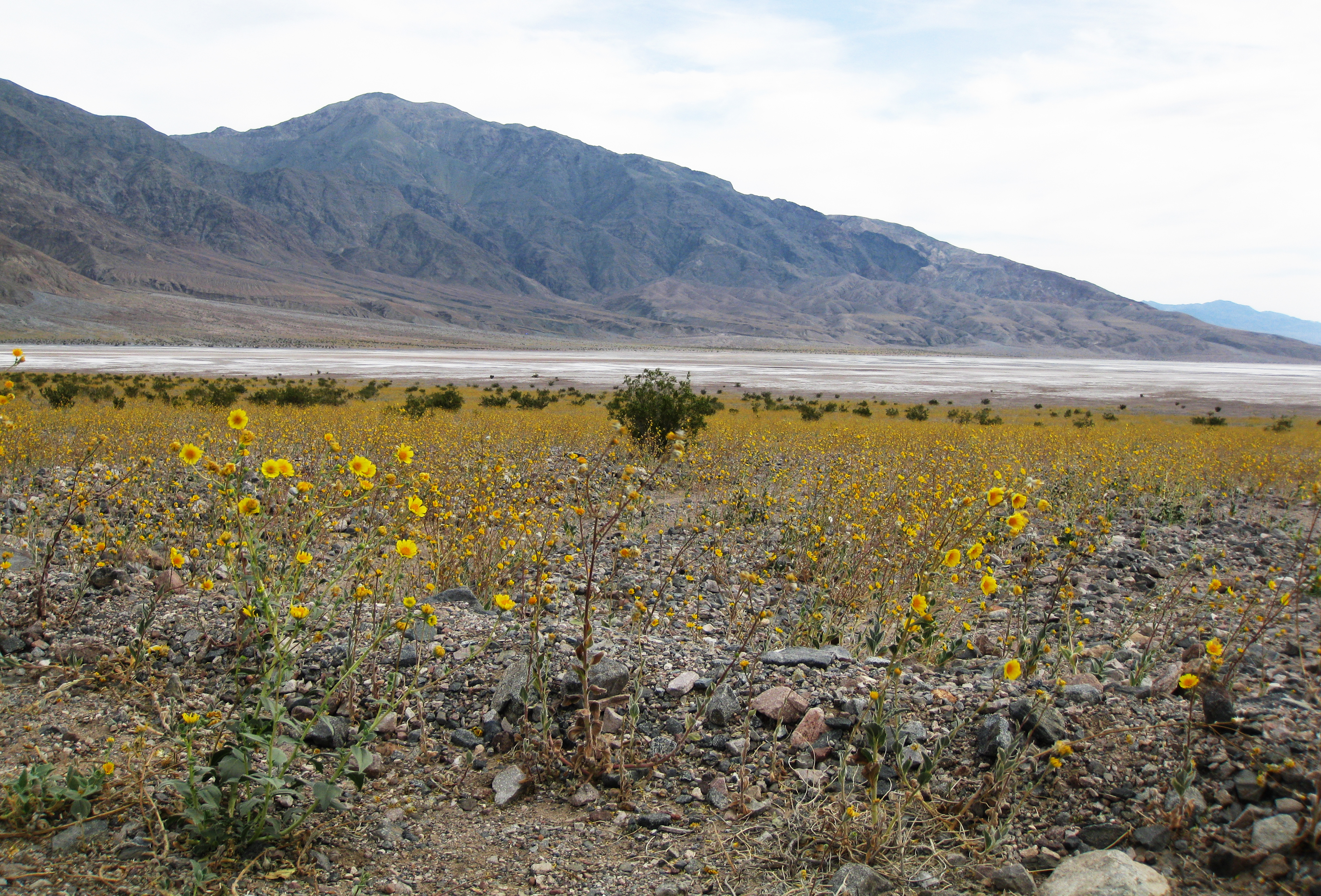
G. canescens in Death Valley

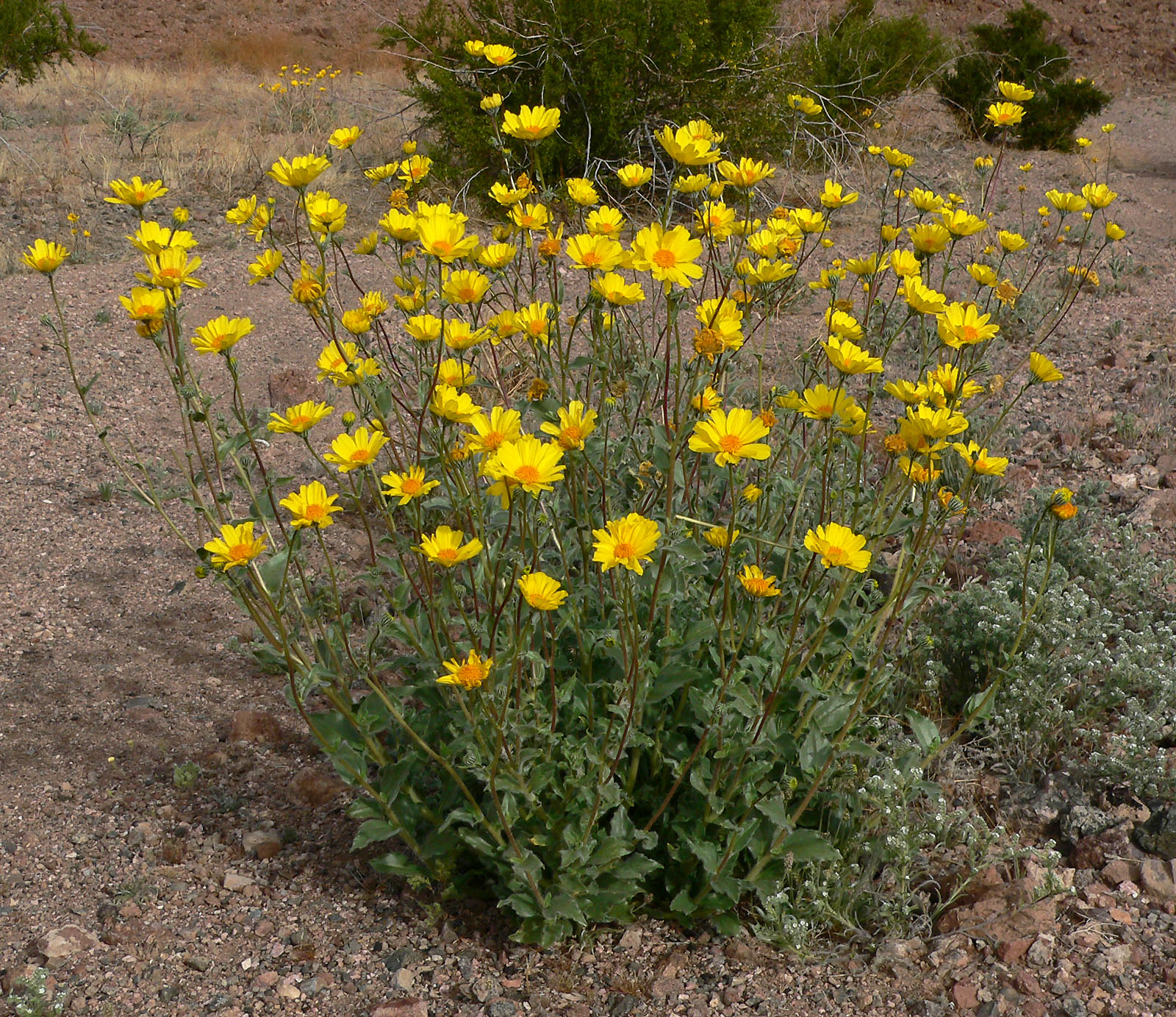
Death Valley National Park

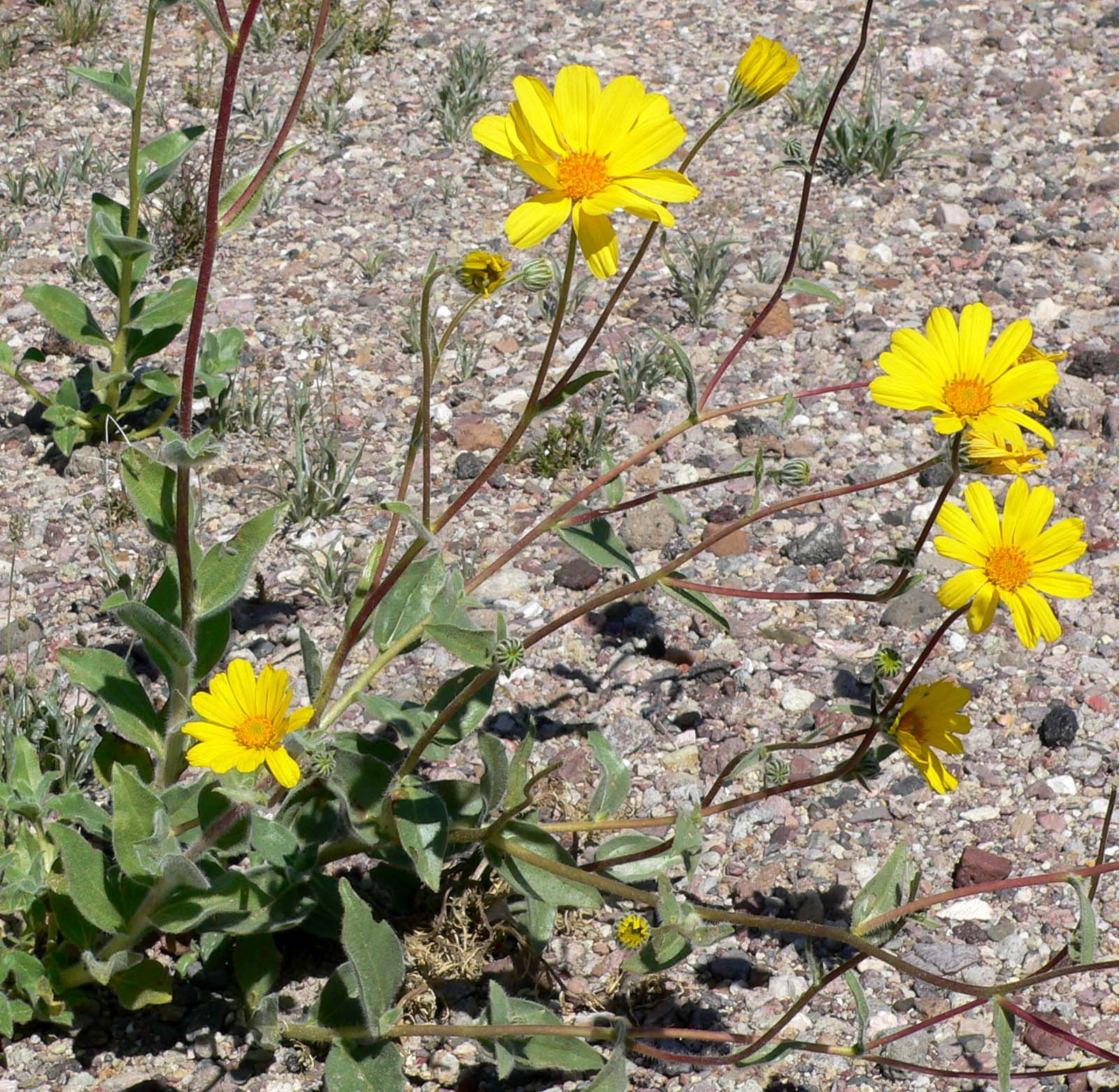
Shoshone, California

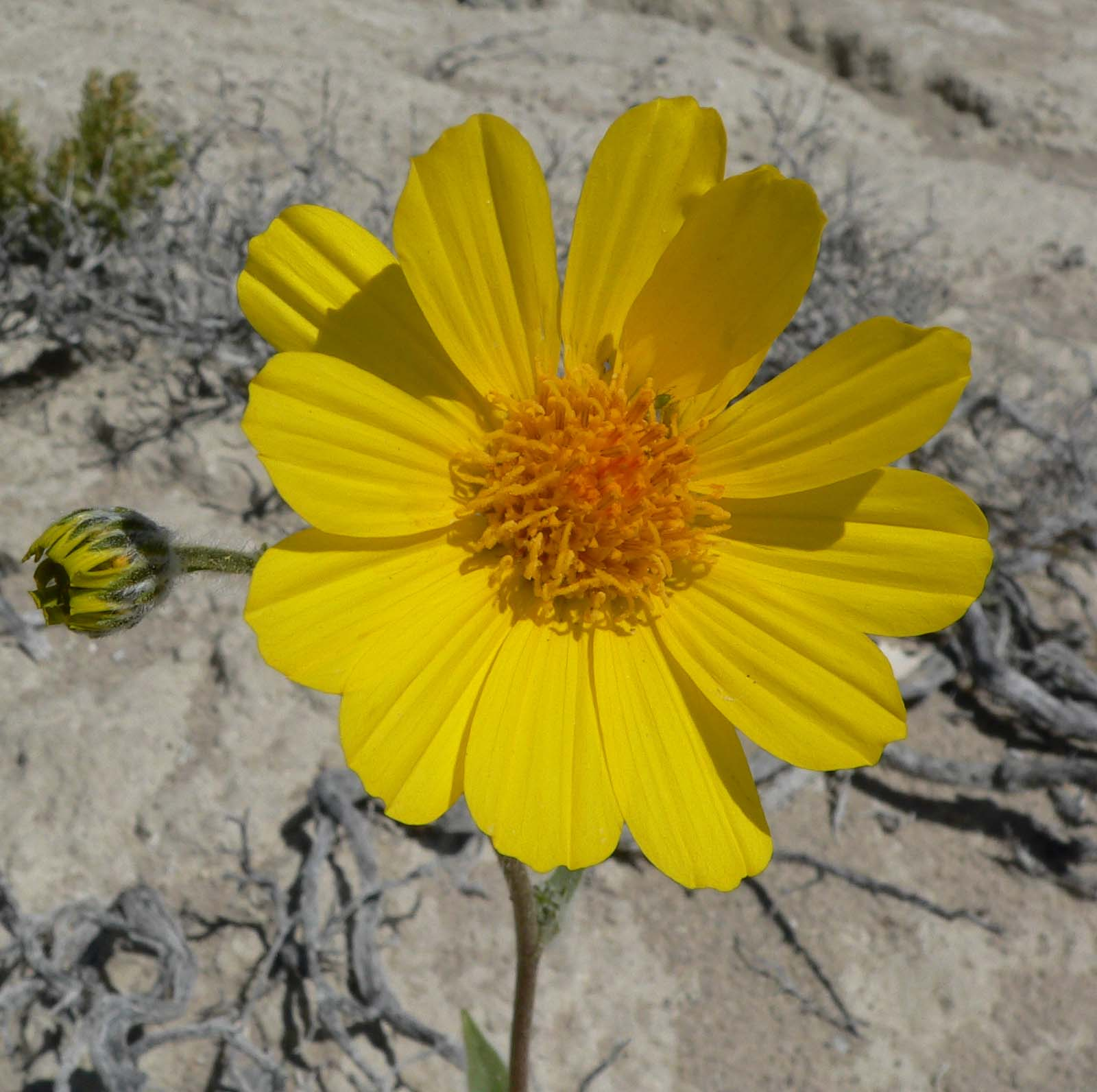
Flower close-up

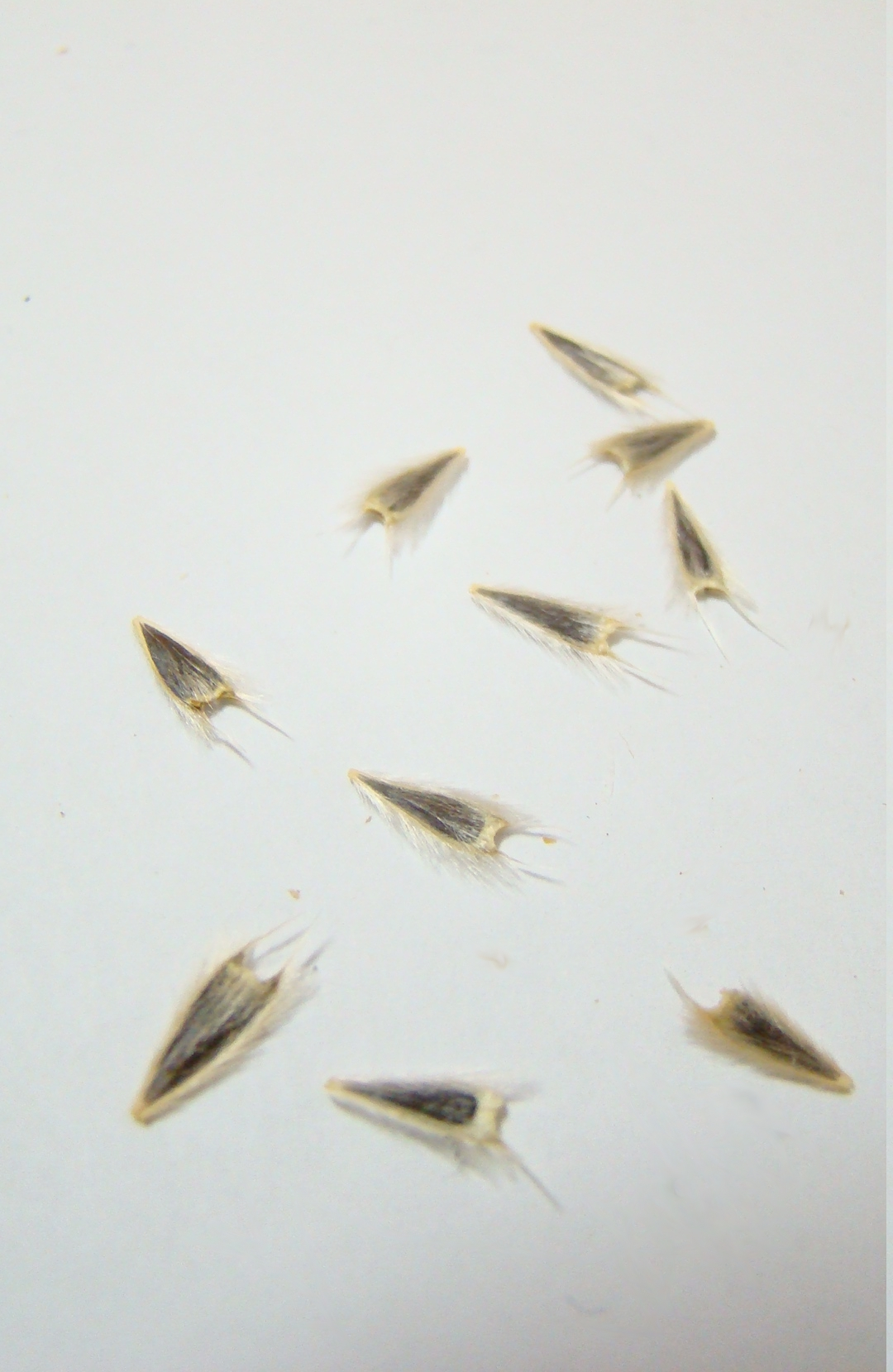
Seeds
