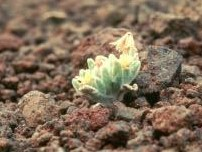

Scientific classification
- Kingdom: Plantae
- Clade: Tracheophytes
- Clade: Angiosperms
- Clade: Eudicots
- Clade: Asterids
- Order: Asterales
- Family: Asteraceae
- Subfamily: Asteroideae
- Tribe: Madieae
- Subtribe: Hulseinae
- Genus: Eatonella; A.Gray
- Species: E. nivea

Binomial name
- Eatonella nivea (D.C.Eaton) A.Gray

Synonyms
- Burrielia nivea D.C.Eaton

= Eatonella =

Genus of flowering plants

Eatonella is a North American genus of plants in the family Asteraceae containing the single known species Eatonella nivea, which is called by the common name white false tickhead. This small annual is native to the western United States, particularly the Great Basin, where it grows in sandy soils. It has been found in Washington (Grant + Kittitas Counties), Oregon, Idaho, Nevada, and eastern California (Modoc, Lassen, Mono, and Inyo Counties).

Eatonella nivea is a short annual plant, growing in a clump rarely more than 5 centimeters (2 inches) high and not much more wide. It has tiny dark green leaves no more than 30 mm (1.2 inches) long, densely packed together and covered in a thick grayish wool. The plant produces flower heads one at a time, which look like tiny pale yellow daisies less than a centimeter across, with up to 13 yellow or purple ray florets and up to 14 yellow disc florets. The fruits are shiny black achenes with white fringe, each a few millimeters long.

The genus was named for the American botanist Daniel Cady Eaton, 1834–1885.

formerly included

- Eatonella congdonii A.Gray, now called Monolopia congdonii (A.Gray) B.G.Baldwin
