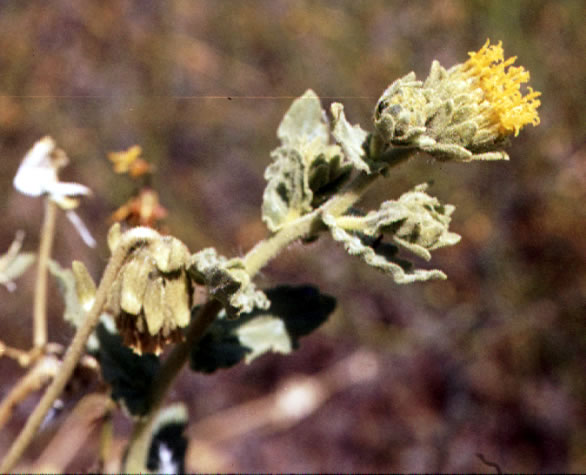

Conservation status
- Vulnerable (NatureServe)

Scientific classification
- Kingdom: Plantae
- Clade: Tracheophytes
- Clade: Angiosperms
- Clade: Eudicots
- Clade: Asterids
- Order: Asterales
- Family: Asteraceae
- Tribe: Heliantheae
- Genus: Geraea
- Species: G. viscida

Binomial name
- Geraea viscida (A.Gray) S.F.Blake (1913)

Synonyms
- Encelia viscida A.Gray (1876)

= Geraea viscida =

Species of flowering plant

Geraea viscida is a species of flowering plant in the family Asteraceae known by the common name sticky geraea, or sticky desertsunflower. It is native to southern California, mainly the chaparral hills of eastern San Diego County, and nearby Baja California.

Geraea viscida is a bristly, glandular perennial geophyte producing scrubby stems reaching anywhere from 30 centimeters (12 inches) to nearly a meter (39 inches) in height. The slightly hairy leaves are several centimeters long and generally oval-shaped, sometimes with small teeth and basal lobes. The inflorescence holds one or more flower heads which are knobby clusters of yellow disc florets but no ray florets. The phyllaries surrounding the flower head are particularly sticky. The fruit is an achene up to a centimeter (0.4 inches) long, not including its pappus hairs.
