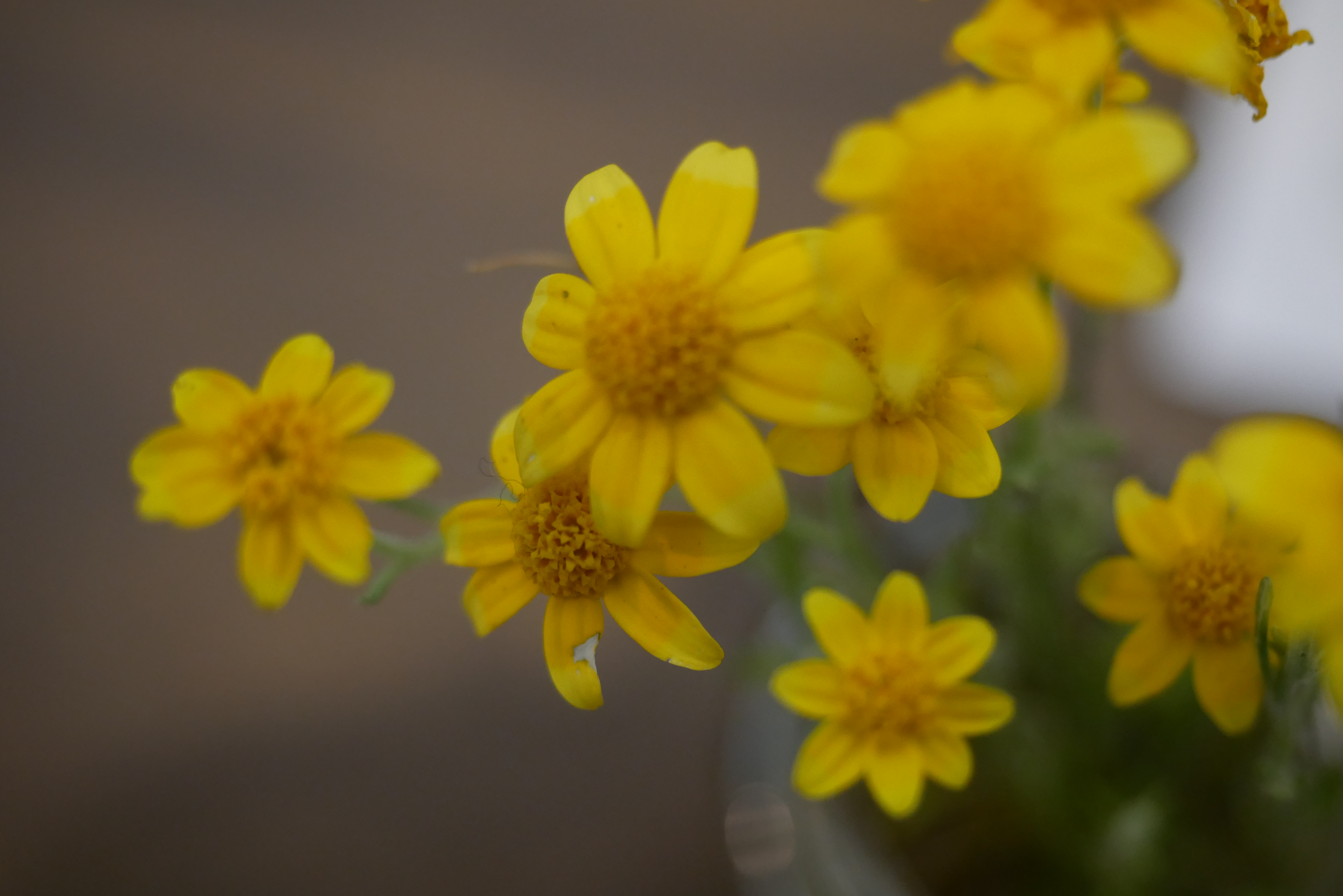

Scientific classification
- Kingdom: Plantae
- Clade: Tracheophytes
- Clade: Angiosperms
- Clade: Eudicots
- Clade: Asterids
- Order: Asterales
- Family: Asteraceae
- Genus: Monolopia
- Species: M. gracilens

Binomial name
- Monolopia gracilens A.Gray

= Monolopia gracilens =

Species of flowering plant

Monolopia gracilens is a species of flowering plant in the family Asteraceae known by the common name woodland monolopia. It is endemic to California, where it is known from the mountains of the San Francisco Bay Area and ranges just to the south. It grows in grassland, chaparral, woodland, and other habitat, often on serpentine soils. It is an annual herb producing a slender, branching stem up to about 80 centimeters tall. It is usually somewhat woolly in texture. The inflorescences at the ends of stem branches bear small hemispheric flower heads. The golden ray florets are up to a centimeter long and surround a center of many disc florets. The fruit is an achene about 2 millimeters long.
