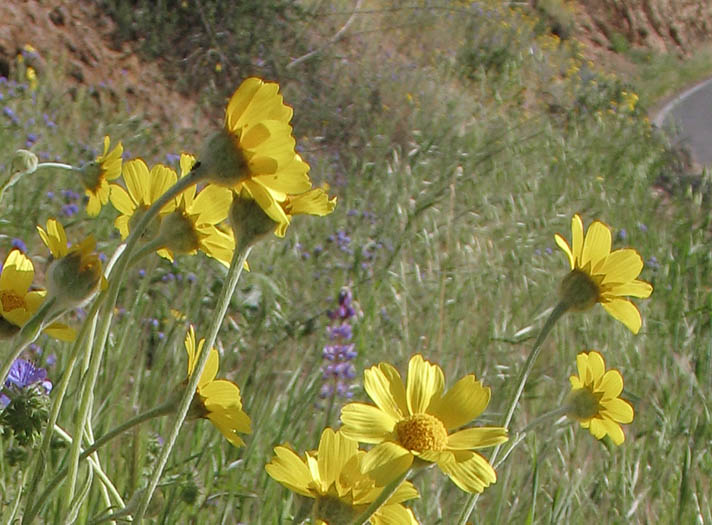
- Monolopia lanceolata

Scientific classification
- Kingdom: Plantae
- Clade: Embryophytes
- Clade: Tracheophytes
- Clade: Angiosperms
- Clade: Eudicots
- Clade: Asterids
- Order: Asterales
- Family: Asteraceae
- Subfamily: Asteroideae
- Tribe: Madieae
- Subtribe: Baeriinae
- Genus: Monolopia; DC.

Type species
- Monolopia major DC.

Synonyms
- Lembertia Greene

= Monolopia =

Genus of flowering plants

Monolopia is a genus of flowering plants in the family Asteraceae.

The entire genus is endemic to California.

Species

- Monolopia congdonii (syn. Lembertia congdonii) — San Joaquin woollythread - from Fresno Co to Santa Barbara Co
- Monolopia gracilens — woodland monolopia - from Contra Costa Co to San Luis Obispo Co
- Monolopia lanceolata — common monolopia - from Contra Costa + San Joaquin Cos to San Diego + Riverside Cos.
- Monolopia major — cupped monolopia - from Tehama Co to Ventura Co
- Monolopia stricta - Crum's monolopia - from Monterey + Merced Cos to Kern Co
