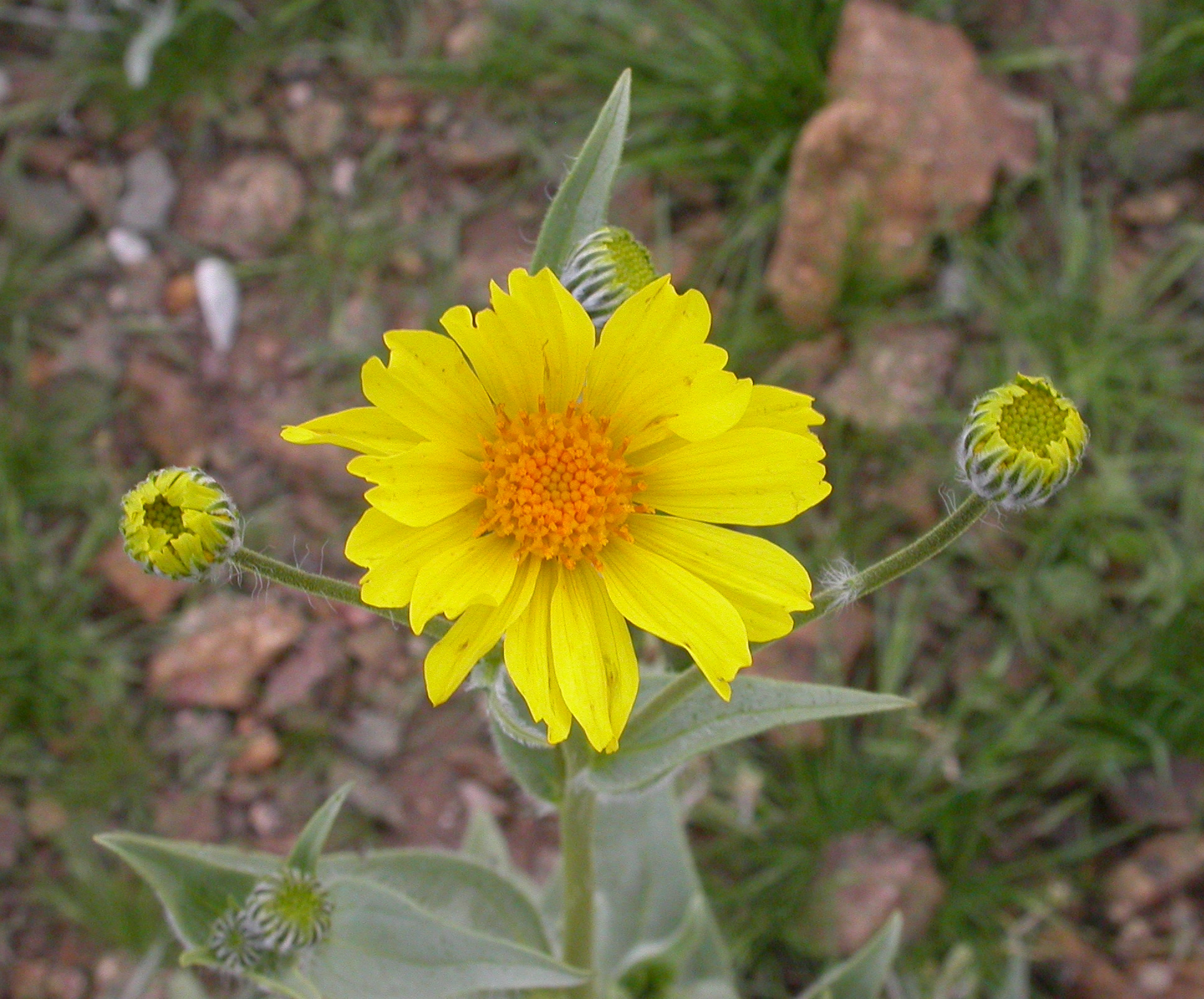
- Geraea canescens

Scientific classification
- Kingdom: Plantae
- Clade: Tracheophytes
- Clade: Angiosperms
- Clade: Eudicots
- Clade: Asterids
- Order: Asterales
- Family: Asteraceae
- Tribe: Heliantheae
- Subtribe: Enceliinae
- Genus: Geraea; Torr. & A.Gray, 1847

Type species
- Geraea canescens Torr. & A.Gray

= Geraea =

Genus of flowering plants

Geraea is a genus of the family Asteraceae from the southwestern United States and northwestern Mexico, commonly called the desert sunflower.

Species

- Geraea canescens Torr. & A.Gray - California, Arizona, Nevada, Utah
- Geraea viscida (A.Gray) S.F.Blake - California (San Diego + Imperial Counties), Baja California
