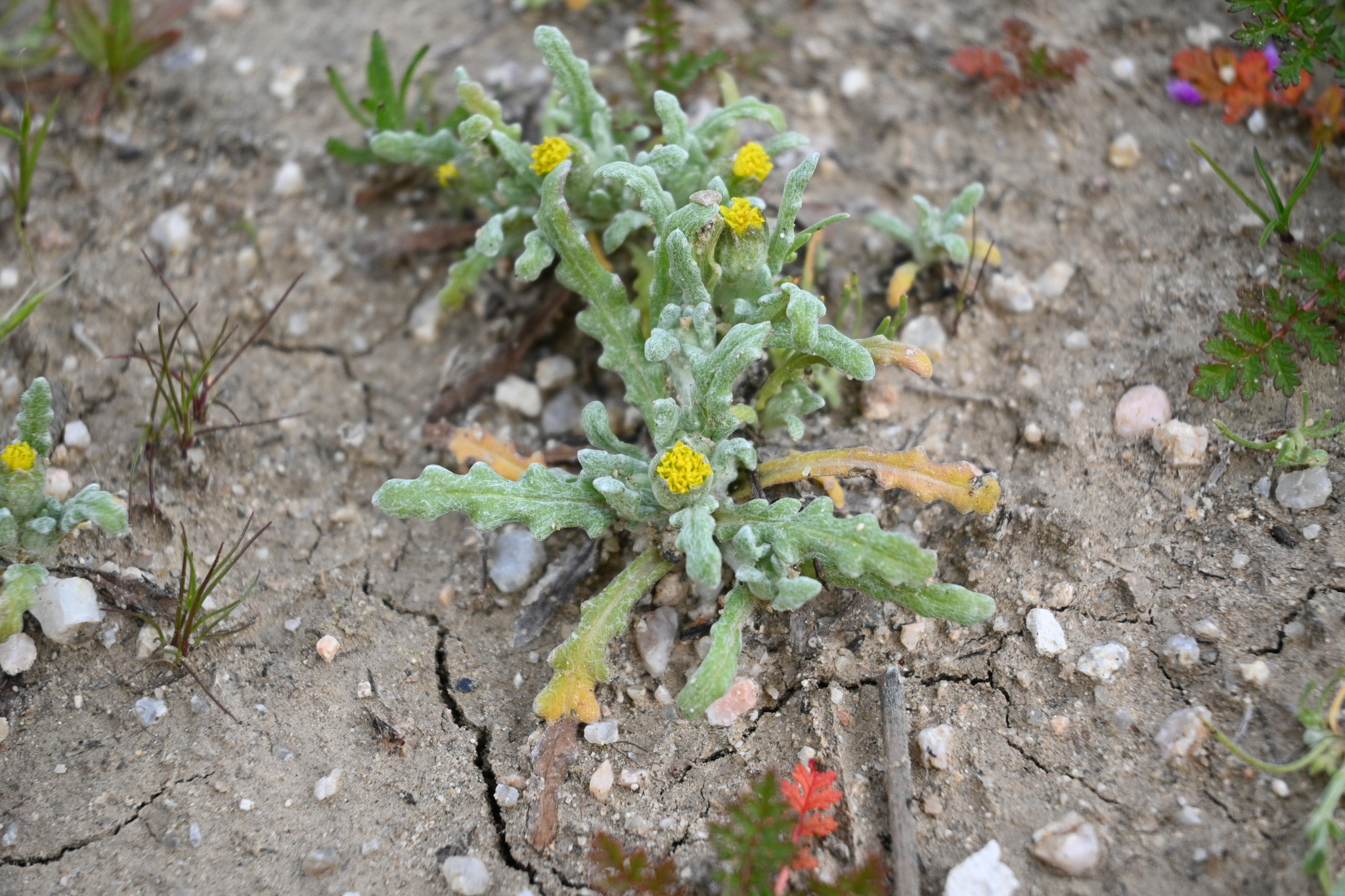

Conservation status
- Vulnerable (NatureServe)

Scientific classification
- Kingdom: Plantae
- Clade: Tracheophytes
- Clade: Angiosperms
- Clade: Eudicots
- Clade: Asterids
- Order: Asterales
- Family: Asteraceae
- Genus: Monolopia
- Species: M. congdonii

Binomial name
- Monolopia congdonii (A.Gray) B.G.Baldwin

Synonyms
- Eatonella congdonii; Lembertia congdonii

= Monolopia congdonii =

Species of flowering plant

Monolopia congdonii (formerly Lembertia congdonii) is a rare species of flowering plant in the family Asteraceae known by the common name San Joaquin woollythread. It is endemic to California, where it is known only from the southern San Joaquin Valley and one area in nearby Santa Barbara County. It is a federally listed endangered species.

== Description ==
This is a small annual herb with a trailing or somewhat upright stem coated thinly in woolly fibers. The leaves are up to about 4 centimeters long and have wavy edges. The inflorescences at the end of stem branches bear small hemispheric flower heads. Each head is wrapped in phyllaries with black glandular hairs and has a center of glandular yellow disc florets. There are also yellow ray florets but they are so small they are nearly invisible. Each is about half a millimeter long and has a minutely lobed tip.

== See also ==
- Joseph Whipple Congdon
