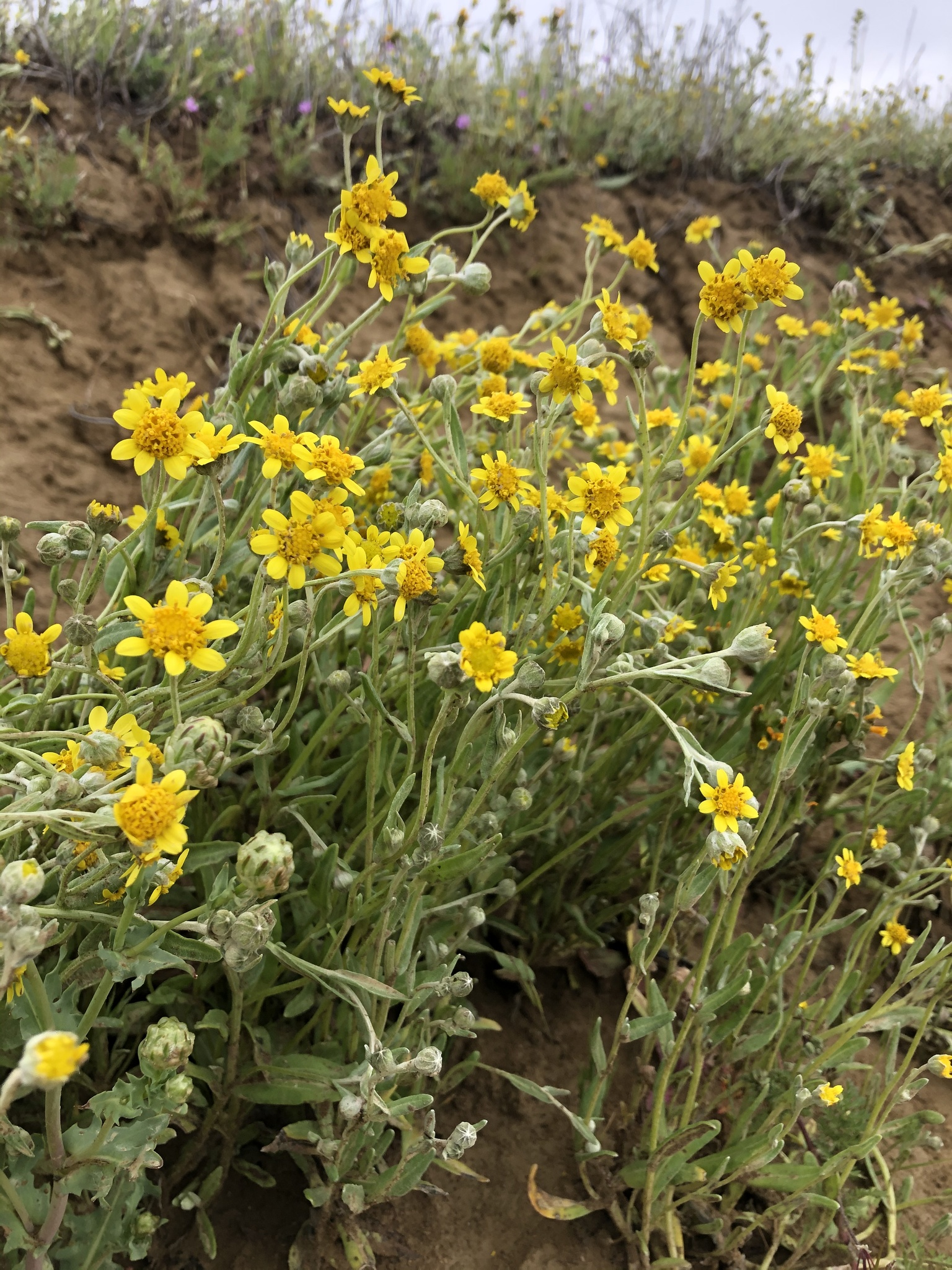

Scientific classification
- Kingdom: Plantae
- Clade: Tracheophytes
- Clade: Angiosperms
- Clade: Eudicots
- Clade: Asterids
- Order: Asterales
- Family: Asteraceae
- Genus: Monolopia
- Species: M. stricta

Binomial name
- Monolopia stricta Crum

= Monolopia stricta =

Species of flowering plant

Monolopia stricta is a species of flowering plant in the family Asteraceae known by the common name Crum's monolopia. It is endemic to central California, where it grows in the Central Valley and its flanking mountain ranges and foothills. It open grasslands and chaparral, often in clay soils. It is an annual herb producing a slender, sometimes branching stem up to about 80 centimeters tall. It is usually somewhat woolly in texture. The inflorescences at the ends of stem branches bear small hemispheric flower heads. The golden ray florets are usually about 1 to 2 centimeters long, but specimens from the western San Joaquin Valley have smaller florets.
