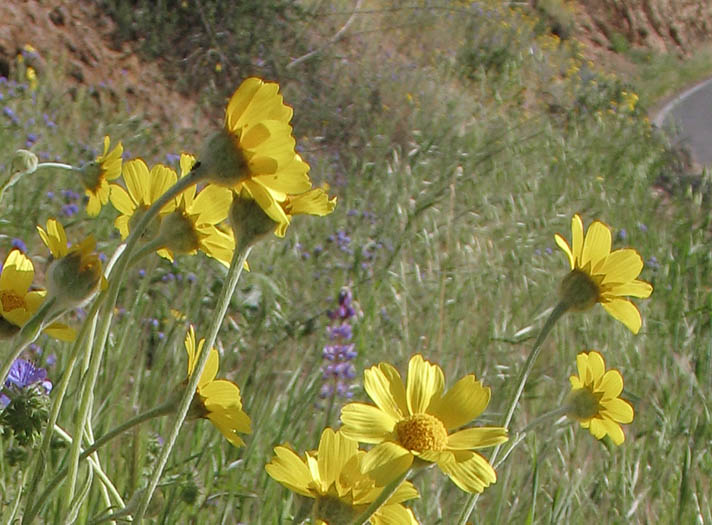

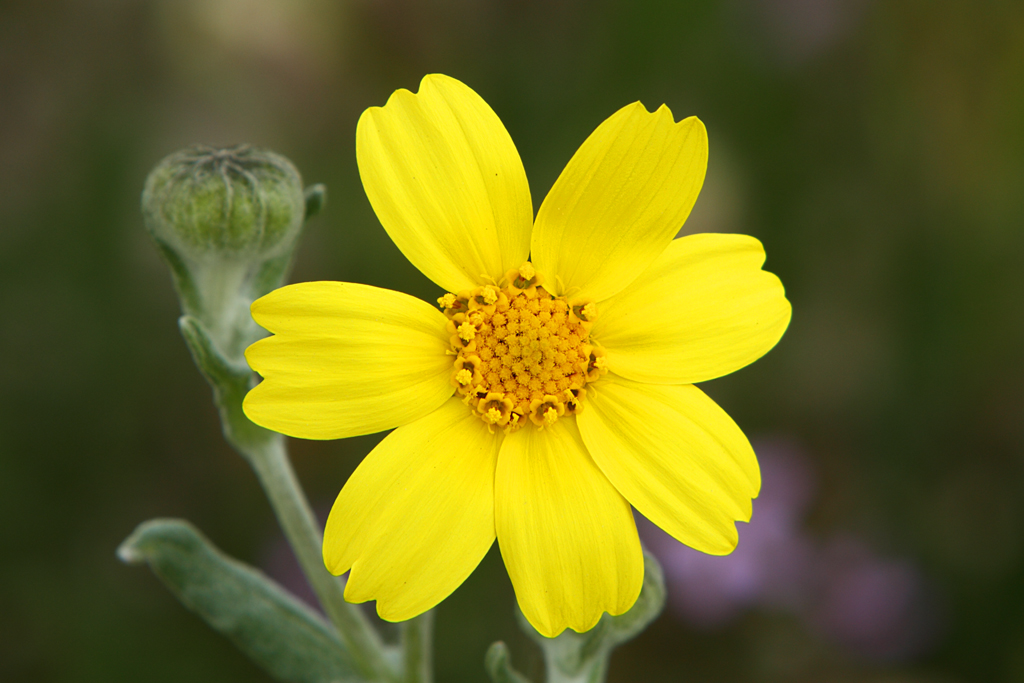

Scientific classification
- Kingdom: Plantae
- Clade: Tracheophytes
- Clade: Angiosperms
- Clade: Eudicots
- Clade: Asterids
- Order: Asterales
- Family: Asteraceae
- Genus: Monolopia
- Species: M. lanceolata

Binomial name
- Monolopia lanceolata Nutt.

= Monolopia lanceolata =

Species of flowering plant

Monolopia lanceolata, the hillside daisy or common monolopia, is a species of flowering plant in the family Asteraceae. It is endemic to the southern half of California, where it grows in many types of habitat, including coastal and valley grassland, chaparral, woodland, and desert.

== Description ==
Monolopia lanceolata is an annual herb producing a slender, sometimes branching stem up to about 80 centimeters tall. It is usually somewhat woolly in texture.

The inflorescences at the ends of stem branches bear small hemispheric flower heads. The golden ray florets are 1 to 2 centimeters long and have three-lobed tips. They surround a center of many disc florets.

The fruit is a rough-haired achene 2 to 4 millimeters long.

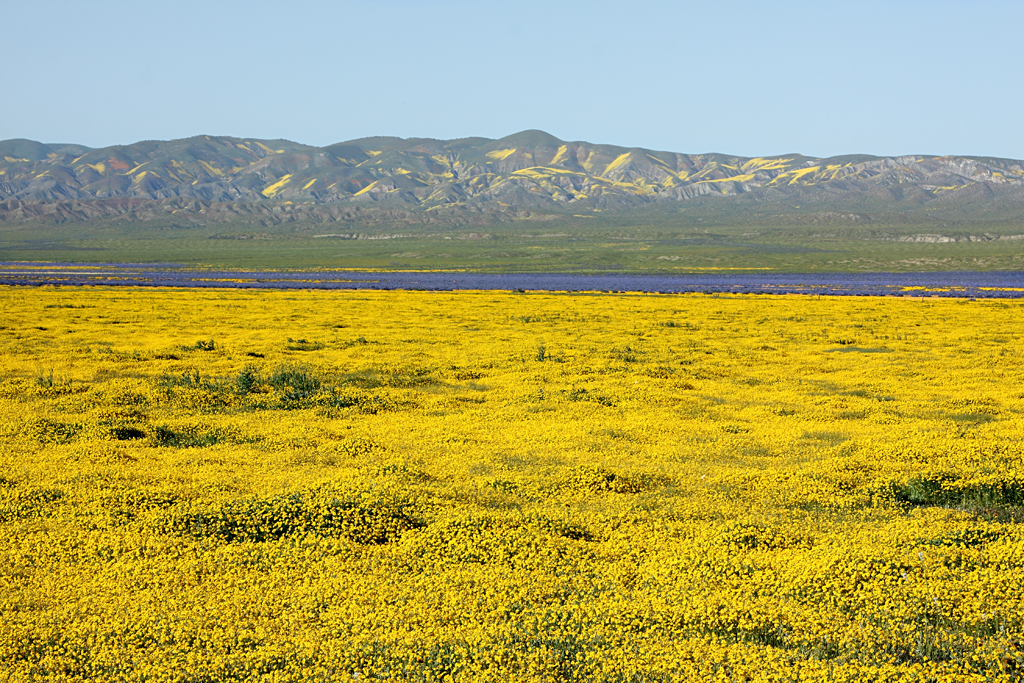
In Carrizo Plain National Monument, eastern San Luis Obispo County.
